= House of Loredan =

Noble family and political dynasty

- Noble House
- Blazon: Party per fess or and azure, six roses barbed and seeded; in chief three in azure, and in base three in or.
- Country: Republic of Venice; Papal States; Holy Roman Empire; Austrian Empire
- Current region: Croatia; Italy; United Kingdom
- Earlier spellings: Laurae, in ancient Rome; Loredano (Italian); Lauredanus (Latin)
- Etymology: from Laureati, due to their ancestors' historical glory; from the town of Loreo
- Origin: Rome, Lazio; Loreo, Veneto
- Founded: 1015, likely earlier
- Founder: Gaius Mucius Scaevola (traditional); Marco Loredan (historical)
- Final ruler: Francesco Loredan
- Titles: Doge of Venice; Dogaressa of Venice; Duke of Albania; Duke of Candia; Duke of Corfu; Duke of Cyprus; Duke of Dalmatia; Duke of Friuli; Duke of Istria; Duke of the Morea; Duke of Thessaloniki; Duchess of Naxos; and others (List)
- Style: Serene Highness
- Members: Alvise; Andrea; Andrea; Antonio; Antonio; Caterina; Fosco; Francesco; Francesco; Giacomo; Giorgio; Giovanni; Giovanni; Giovanni F.; Leonardo; Marco; Marco; Marco; Paolina; Pietro; Pietro; Teodoro
- Connected members: Marco Polo; Marino Faliero; Maffeo Vallaresso; Francesco Barbaro; Antonio Grimani; Domenico Grimani; Francesco III Crispo; John IV Crispo; Francesco Venier; Carlo Contarini; Elena Cornaro Piscopia
- Connected families: Barbarigo; Barbaro; Barozzi; Bembo; Bragadin; Calogerà; Contarini; Cornaro; Correr; Dandolo; Dolfin; Donà; Foscari; Giustiniani; Grimani; Marcello; Mocenigo; Mòro; Morosini; Pignatelli; Pisani; Priuli; Salamon; Sceriman; Vendramin; Venier; Zorzi; Zulian
- Distinctions: Golden Rose; Knight of the Golden Spur; Order of Saint Mark; Order of the Golden Stole; Order of Merit for Labour
- Traditions: Roman Catholicism
- Motto: NON NOBIS DOMINE ("Praise us not, O Lord.")
- Estates: Antiparos (1440 - 1480); Barban (1534 - 1869); Bertinoro; Loreo; Mykonos (1468 - 1518); Ormelle; Rachele (1534 - 1869); Tinos (1468 - 1700s); Vangadizza (1484 - 1608)
- Properties: Ca' Loredan; Ca' Loredan Vendramin; Palazzo Loredan dell'Ambasciatore; Palazzo Loredan at Campo S. Stefano; Palazzo Priuli Ruzzini Loredan; Palazzo Loredan Cini; Palazzo Giustinian Loredan; Palazzo Loredan Gheltoff; Palazzo Loredan a San Cancian; Palazzo Loredan Porcia; Villa Barbarigo Loredan; Villa Spineda Loredan; Villa Razzolini Loredan; Villa Nani Loredan; Villa Loredan Bragadin; Villa Loredan Grimani; Villa Loredan Gritti; Villa Loredan Perocco; Villa Loredan at Stra; Barchessa Loredan; Castle of Antiparos; and others (Gallery)
- Cadet branches: Santo Stefano (extinct 1767); Santa Maria

The House of Loredan (Italian: [lore'dan], Venetian: [loɾeˈdaŋ]) is a Venetian noble family of supposed ancient Roman origin, which has played a significant role in shaping the history of the Mediterranean world. A political dynasty, the family has throughout the centuries produced a number of famous personalities: doges, statesmen, magnates, financiers, diplomats, military commanders, naval captains, church dignitaries, and patrons of the arts.

In the centuries following the fall of the Western Roman Empire, the Loredans were lords in Emilia-Romagna, from where they came to Venice in the early 11th century. The family grew in power in the High Middle Ages, amassing great wealth on the lucrative silk and spice trade, and in the following centuries it became influential in regions across the Mediterranean, playing a significant role in shaping its history throughout the Late Middle Ages, the Renaissance and the early modern period. The family was significant in all domestic and colonial territories of the Republic of Venice, and at various points in history, its members have held titles in what are now the modern countries of Italy, Austria, Slovenia, Croatia, Montenegro, Albania, France, Greece and Cyprus, and conducted trade operations as far as Egypt, Persia, India and China, most notably the tumultuous fourteenth-century Voyage of the Loredan Brothers. Alongside other families of Venice's urban nobility, they played a major role in fostering mercantilism and early capitalism, and are associated by historians with the development of early commercial contracts, international finance, banking, and the administrative and legal frameworks that supported pre-modern trade.

Although the Loredans were proponents of Venice's traditional, maritime orientation, and viewed with distrust its expansion on the Italian mainland, they played a key role in the territorial development, and ultimately, the history of the Republic of Venice, helping to expand its Mainland Dominions and the State of the Sea. The family was significant in the Italian Wars, with Doge Leonardo Loredan leading Venice to a victory against the Papal States in the War of the League of Cambrai, which resulted in the pope having to pay the Loredan family a financial settlement of approximately 500,000 ducats, an enormous amount of money, making them one of the richest families in the world at the time. Furthermore, many of its members distinguished themselves as admirals and generals in defending Europe from the Ottoman conquests in the Ottoman-Venetian wars. Their various naval triumphs have been honoured with the MV Loredan auxiliary cruiser of the Italian Royal Navy.

The family has also played an important role in the creation of modern opera with the Accademia degli Incogniti, also called the Loredanian Academy, and has patroned many artists of the Venetian School, including Giovanni and Gentile Bellini, Giorgione, Vittore Carpaccio, Vincenzo Catena, Sebastiano del Piombo, Titian, Paris Bordone, Jacopo and Domenico Tintoretto, Paolo Veronese, Palma il Giovane, Canaletto, Pietro Longhi, and Francesco Guardi, among others. At the height of the Renaissance, the family's residences were being designed and constructed by renowned architects, notably Mauro Codussi, Jacopo Sansovino, and Andrea Palladio.

The wealth of the family at its peak was legendary, especially between the 15th and the 18th centuries, when they owned numerous palaces, as well as hundreds of estates and vast land holdings across the territories of the Republic; the most notable of these were Barban and Rakalj in Istria, as well as Antiparos, Tinos and Mykonos in the Aegean. Besides the silk and spice trade, they also participated in the medieval slave trade, and were, more than once, accused of usury and sodomy, often by long-time political rivals such as the Falier and Foscari families. In cases of corruption, assault, murder and other scandals, when members of their own family were involved, the Loredans usually pursued a policy of lenience and outright tolerance, and aimed to resolve relating accusations by means of threats or bribery.

Today, the Loredan coat of arms, which features six roses on a shield of gold and blue, is displayed on numerous buildings and palaces across the territories previously held by the Republic of Venice; from the Veneto and Friuli, Istria and Dalmatia, and in the more distant possessions such as the Ionian Islands and Crete. In Venice, it is even carved into the Rialto Bridge and the façade of St. Mark's Basilica.

== Historiography ==
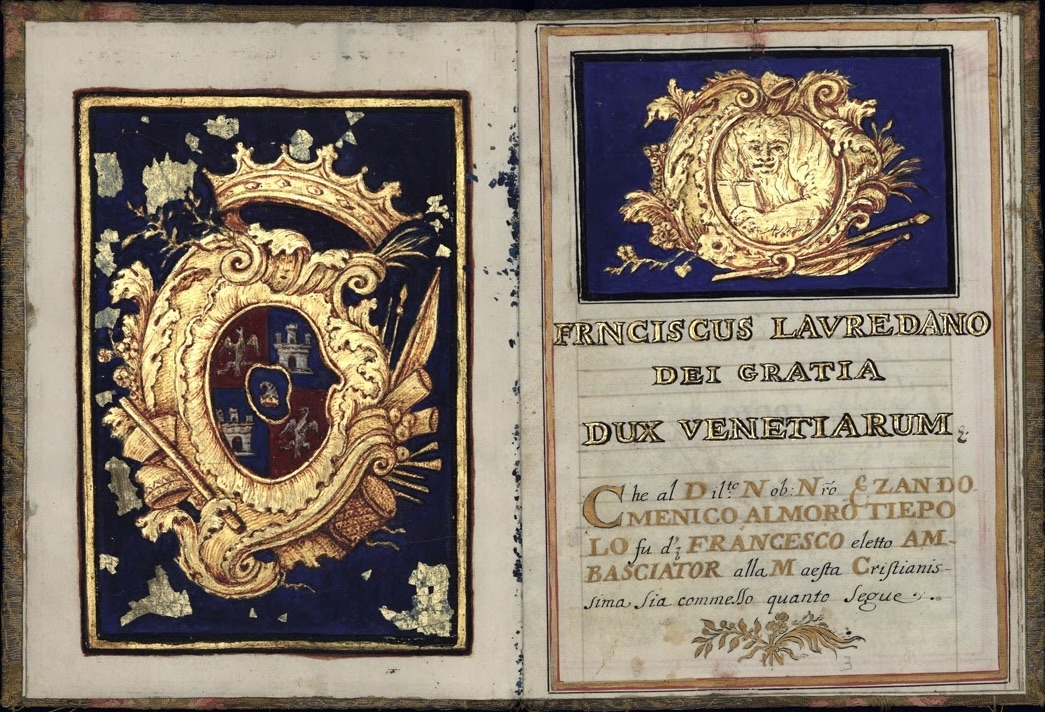
Francesco Loredan, Doge of Venice, appoints Giovanni Tiepolo as the Venetian ambassador to the court of Louis XV of France. Commissione dated 15 March 1760.

The House of Loredan has attracted particular historiographical interest because of the exceptional longevity and complexity of the family, whose documented history extends over approximately a millennium.

The history of the family is particularly well-documented owing to the extensive administrative, judicial, diplomatic, genealogical and notarial records preserved by the Republic of Venice and by institutions in territories formerly under Venetian rule. Relevant material survives in the Venetian State Archives and other Italian collections, as well as in archives and libraries in Croatia, Greece, and elsewhere in the former Venetian territories.

Earlier accounts of the family were often influenced by the genealogical traditions of the Venetian patriciate. Sixteenth- and seventeenth-century writers such as Marco Barbaro and Jacopo Zabarella preserved and elaborated genealogical traditions concerning Venetian noble families, including claims of ancient origins. In the case of the Loredans, these traditions attributed them an antiquity extending to ancient Rome, connecting them with Gaius Mucius Scaevola and with the town of Loreo. Modern scholarship generally treats these claims as legendary or unsubstantiated, while recognising the family's documented presence in Venice from the early eleventh century onward. This distinction between aristocratic genealogical tradition and documentary evidence has consequently been important in modern treatments of the family.

Nineteenth- and early twentieth-century historical works increasingly situated the Loredans within the institutional and political history of the Venetian Republic, focusing on prominent individuals, state offices and military achievements. Individual members have received substantial treatment in biographical and prosopographical scholarship; for example, the Dizionario Biografico degli Italiani contains separate scholarly biographies of numerous Loredans, while the Enciclopedia Italiana and Treccani provide broader treatments of the family and prominent members. More recent scholarship has adopted a more critical and contextual approach, examining the family through archival sources and within wider frameworks of Venetian social history, including networks of kinship, elite formation, patronage, commerce, territorial administration and the relationship between Venice and its mainland and maritime possessions. This shift, associated with scholars such as Gaetano Cozzi, Frederic Chapin Lane, and later historians of Venetian society, reflects a broader move in historical scholarship from tracing the achievements of individual noble families toward understanding how patrician houses functioned as political, social and economic institutions.

The geographical dispersion of the family's activities has also resulted in a correspondingly dispersed documentary record. Research on the Loredans therefore draws upon Venetian state records alongside archival, ecclesiastical, municipal and notarial material preserved in other parts of the former Venetian Adriatic territories, particularly Istria and Dalmatia. This is especially relevant to the study of individual branches, territorial possessions and local relationships, whose histories may be documented in records outside of Venice itself.

The surviving documentation is nevertheless uneven. Political and military careers, public offices and major territorial or legal transactions (such as those relating to the Loredan estates of Antiparos, Mykonos, Tinos, Vangadizza, Barban, and Rakalj) are generally much better recorded than the private lives of less prominent family members. Even scholarly biographical entries sometimes note that the names of spouses, dates of marriage, children and other aspects of family life remain unknown. The extensive survival of records should therefore not be taken to imply that every branch or generation of the family is equally well-documented.

== Origin and etymology ==
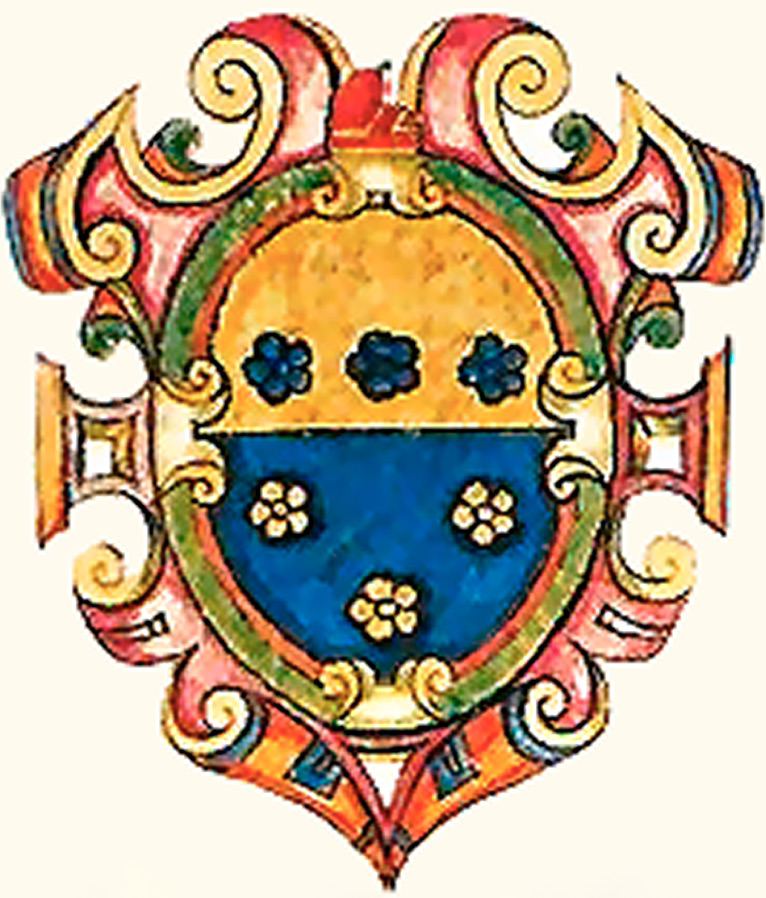
Loredan coat of arms (16th century)

The family is documented in Venice from the medieval period, but early-modern Venetian genealogists traced its ancestry considerably further back, connecting the Loredan with the Mainardi of Bertinoro in Romagna and, ultimately, with the ancient Roman hero Gaius Mucius Scaevola. These genealogical traditions should be distinguished from the family's actual documented history. Camillo Manfroni, writing in the Enciclopedia Italiana in 1934, noted that Venetian chroniclers traced the Loredan to Mucius Scaevola, but regarded the historically demonstrable origins of the family as considerably more recent, placing their appearance in historical sources in the 11th century.

A central element of the traditional genealogy is the family's alleged connection with the town of Loreo in the Polesine. The place was known in medieval sources by forms including Laureti, Lauriton or Lauridon, and Loredo. The toponym is generally connected with Latin lauretum, meaning a place characterized by laurel trees. The inhabitants of Loreo are traditionally known as Loredani. The geographical interpretation therefore understands Loredano as a toponymic designation, approximately "one from Loreo", rather than Loreo as a place named after the Venetian family.

This interpretation, however, exists alongside an older genealogical tradition that attempted to explain the family's name through its supposed descent from the Mainardi of Bertinoro. The most elaborate version is associated with the 16th-century genealogist Marco Barbaro. According to the tradition reported in later sources, a Mainardi who had distinguished himself during the Venetian campaign against Adria in 1163 was living at or associated with Loreo and was consequently described as a Loredano. During Pope Alexander III's stay in Venice in 1177, following the Treaty of Venice between the pope and Holy Roman Emperor Frederick Barbarossa, the pope was said to have requested to meet the warrior who had distinguished himself at Adria. The Mainardi was allegedly knighted and adopted the name and arms of Loredan. In the account transmitted by the tradition, the three hands associated with the Mainardi were replaced by the six roses of the Loredan arms.

The story consequently presents the name Loredan as originating from Loreo: the Mainardi warrior, being a resident or inhabitant of Loreo, was described as a Loredano and subsequently adopted the designation as a hereditary surname. In this interpretation, therefore, the toponym Loreo predates the Venetian family and the family name derives from the place-name, rather than the reverse.

The chronology of this tradition is nevertheless problematic. Girolamo Alessandro Cappellari Vivaro's Campidoglio Veneto, a later genealogical compilation preserved in the Biblioteca Nazionale Marciana, gives as an early ancestor of the Loredan a Marco Loredan who supposedly lived around 1080. This would place a Loredan approximately a century before the Mainardi said by the 1177 tradition to have assumed the name. The discrepancy illustrates the difficulty of reconciling the different genealogical traditions preserved by Venetian writers. Modern scholarship has likewise cautioned that Cappellari Vivaro's Campidoglio Veneto was a later compilation incorporating material from Marco Barbaro and other sources whose reliability varied.

Another version of the genealogy, associated with Jacopo Zabarella's Trasea Peto and repeated by later Venetian antiquarians, traced the family to the Mainardi of Bertinoro and described them as descendants of an ancient Roman lineage. According to this account, their military victories had earned them the appellations Laureati and subsequently Lauretani, from which Loredani was said to have developed. The same tradition claimed that the family had ruled at Bertinoro, subsequently moved to Ferrara, and eventually established itself in the Venetian territories, where it founded or possessed a place called Loredo. Such accounts belong to the genealogical literature of the Venetian patriciate and cannot be treated as documentary evidence for a Roman descent.

The alleged descent from Gaius Mucius Scaevola represents the most remote part of this genealogical tradition. Venetian genealogists associated the Mainardi with Mucius Scaevola and interpreted the family's supposed sequence of names—Laureati, Lauretani and Loredani—as the result of their military distinction and subsequent linguistic change. The association with Mucius Scaevola was part of a wider pattern in Venetian patrician genealogy whereby prominent families claimed descent from ancient Roman figures. Manfroni consequently treated the Scaevola genealogy as a chroniclers' tradition rather than as part of the demonstrable history of the Loredan.

The etymology of the Loredan is therefore best understood separately from the legendary elements of the family's genealogy. The most straightforward linguistic explanation derives the surname from the toponym Loreo, whose medieval forms include Lauredo and Loredo and which is generally connected with Latin lauretum, "laurel grove" or "place of laurels". The alternative derivation from Laureati or Lauretani belongs to the older genealogical tradition and was used to connect the family's name with its alleged Roman ancestry and military honours. The available evidence does not establish the latter as the actual origin of the surname.

In historical sources, the family's name is also encountered as Loredano (IPA: [loreˈdaːno]) in Italian, Lauredano or Lauredanus in Latin, and Lorentano (Λορεντάνο) in Greek, though there it is also sporadically found as Lordas (Λορδᾶς) and Lordano (Λορδάνο).

== Cadet branches ==
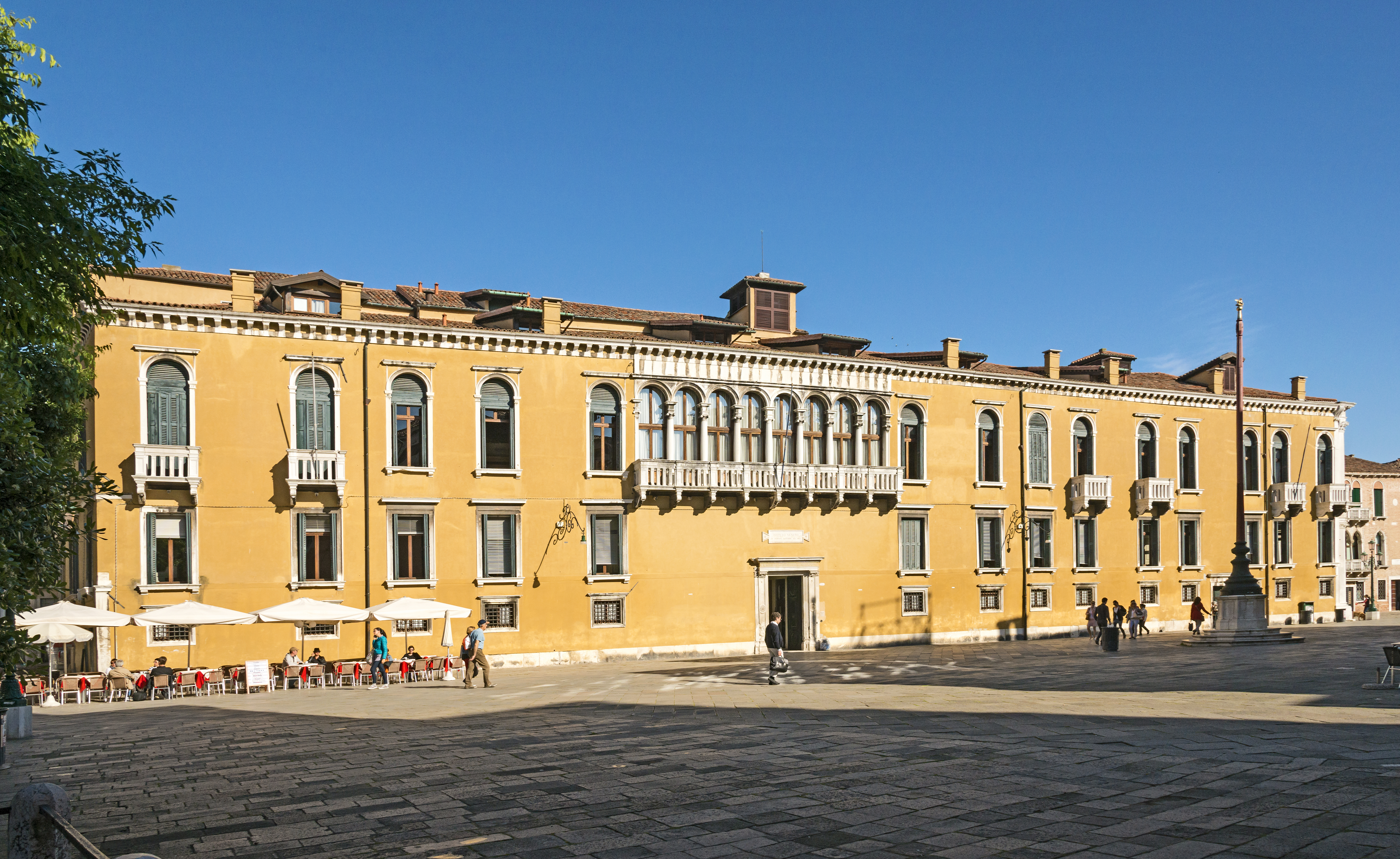
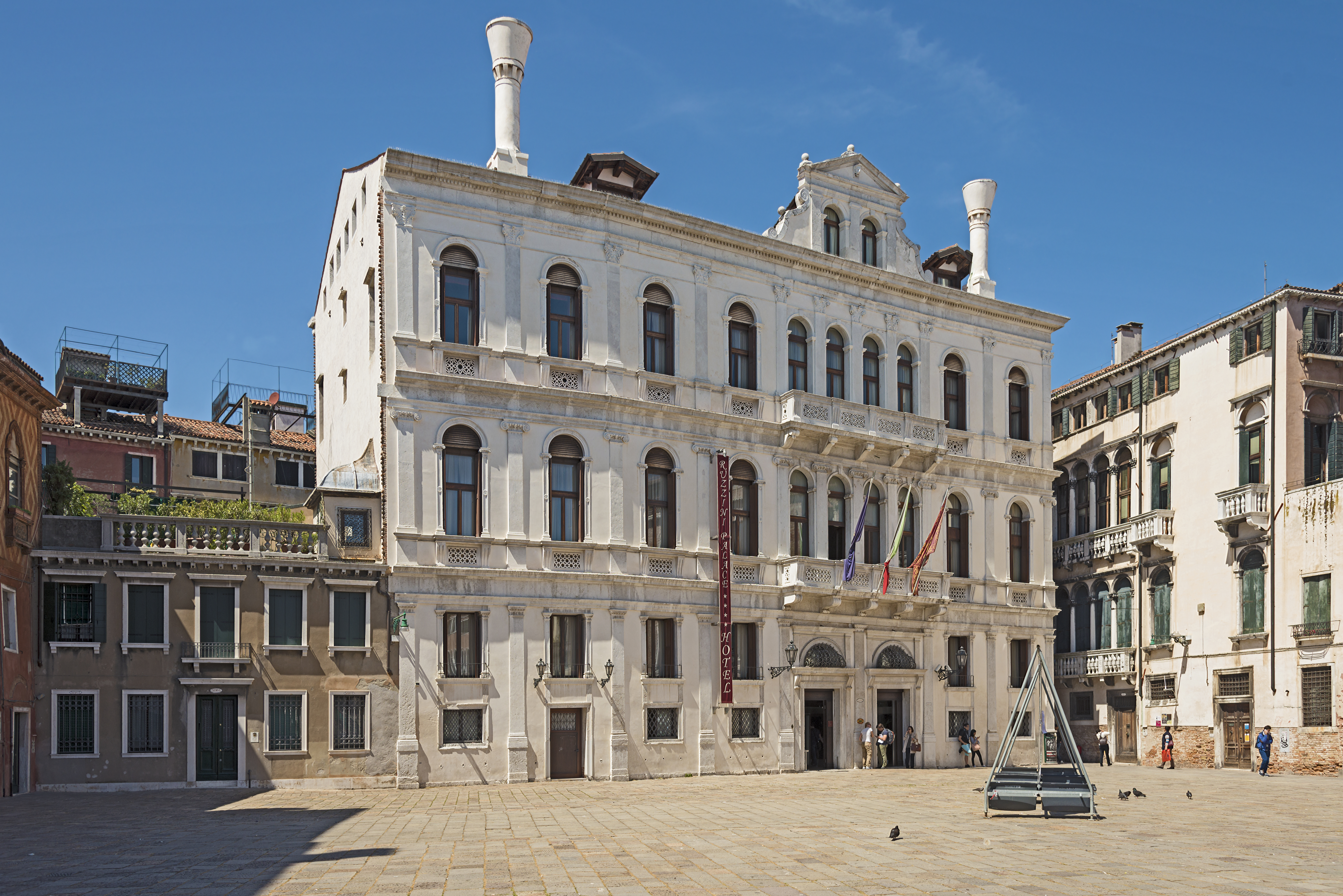
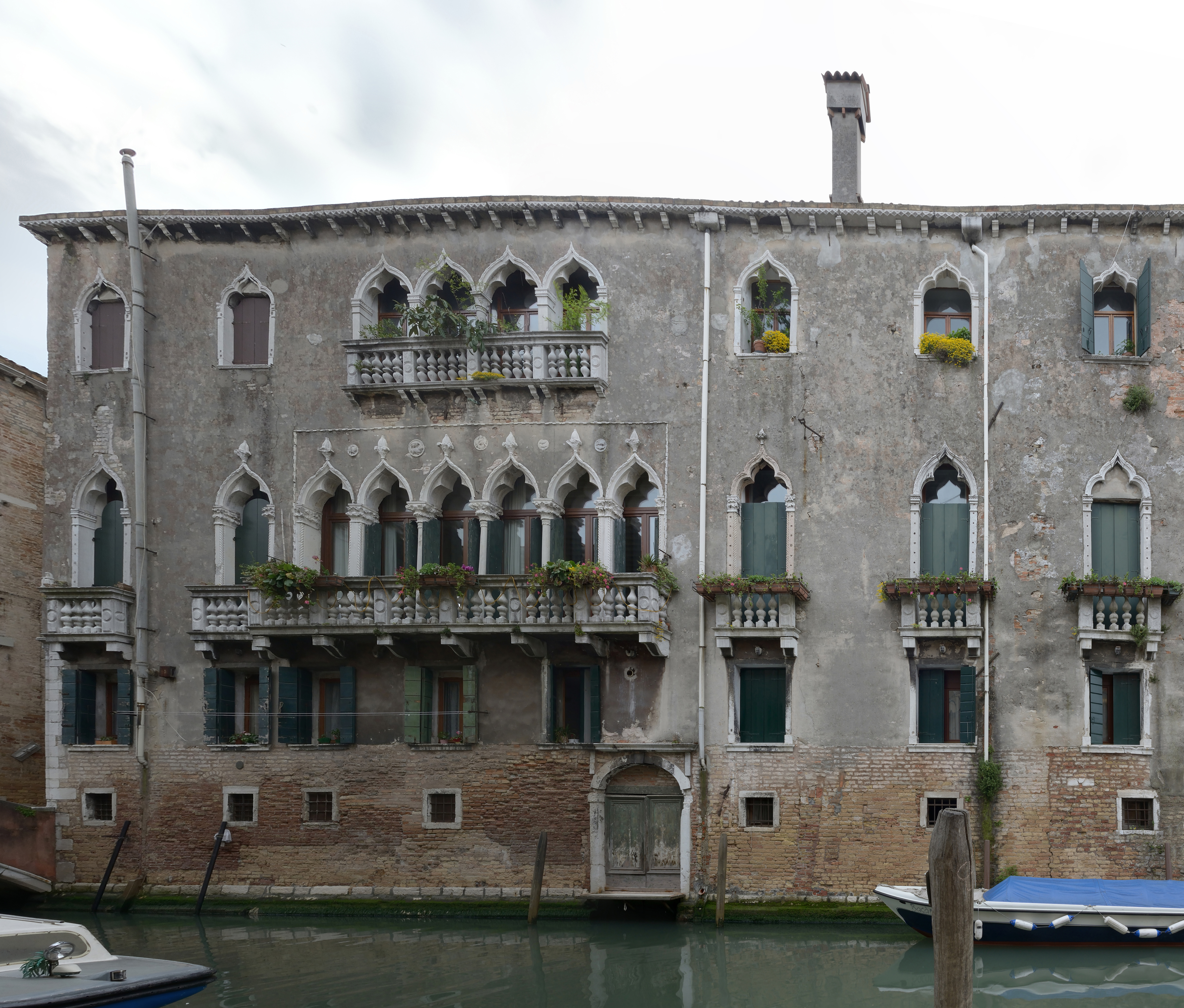
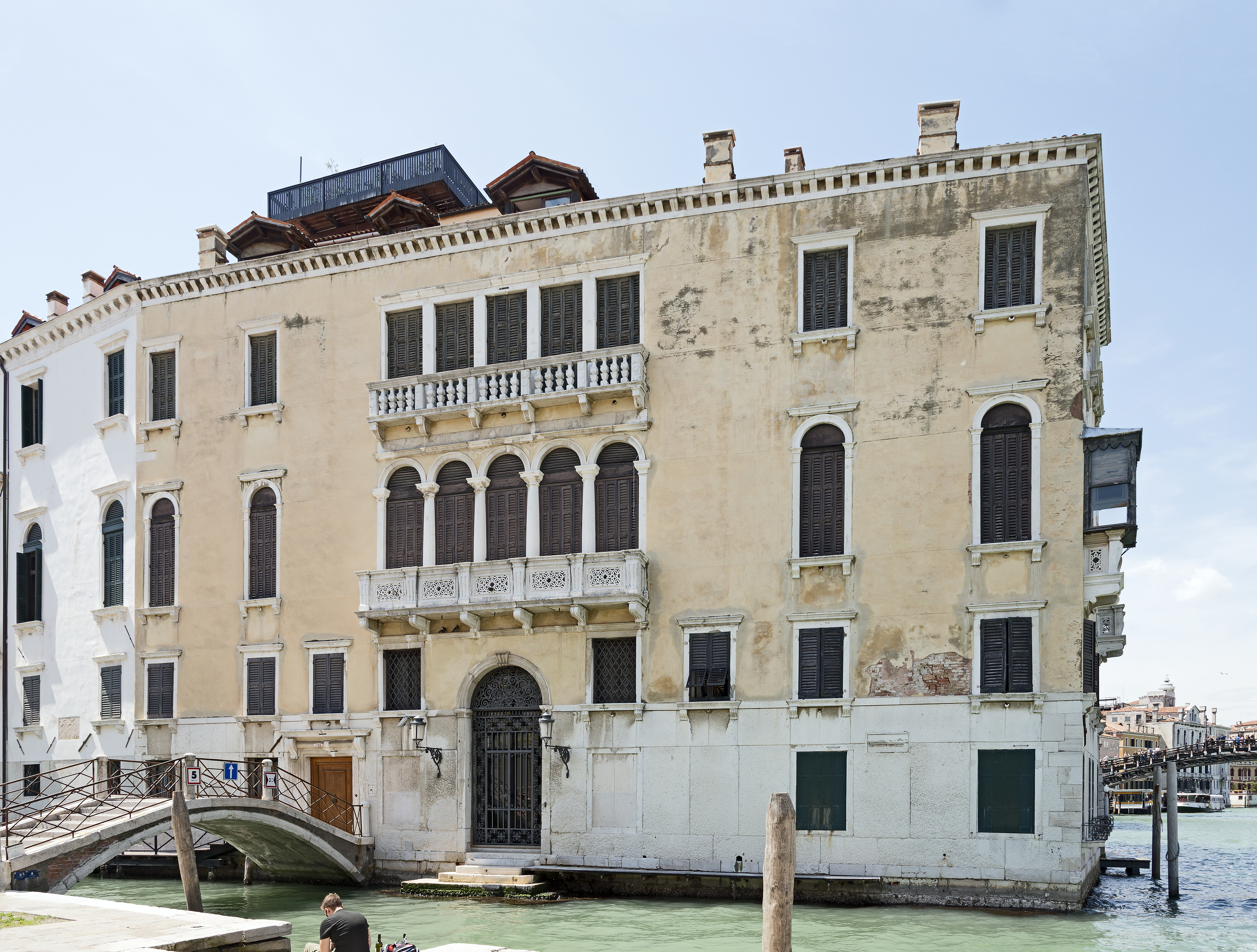
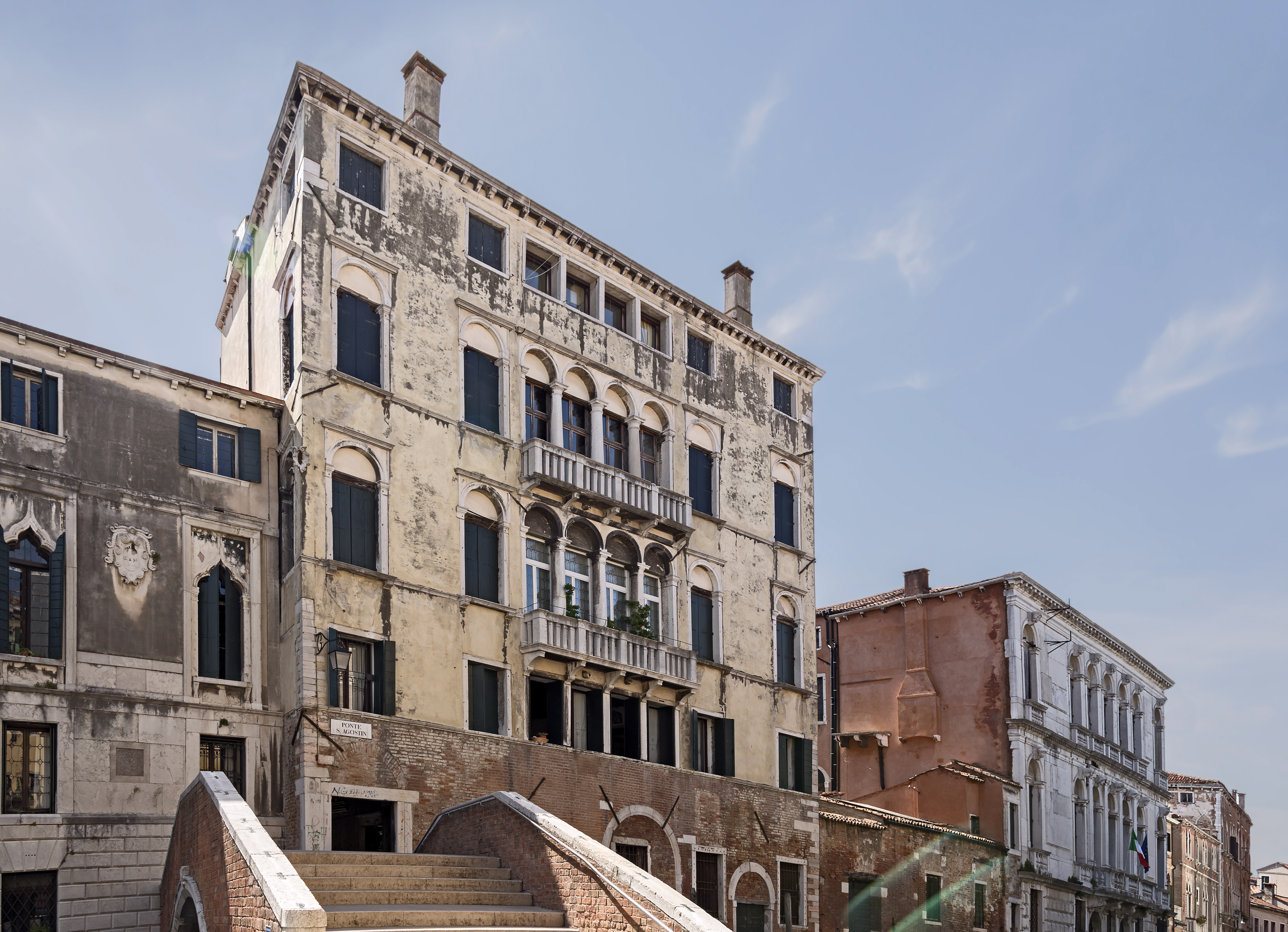
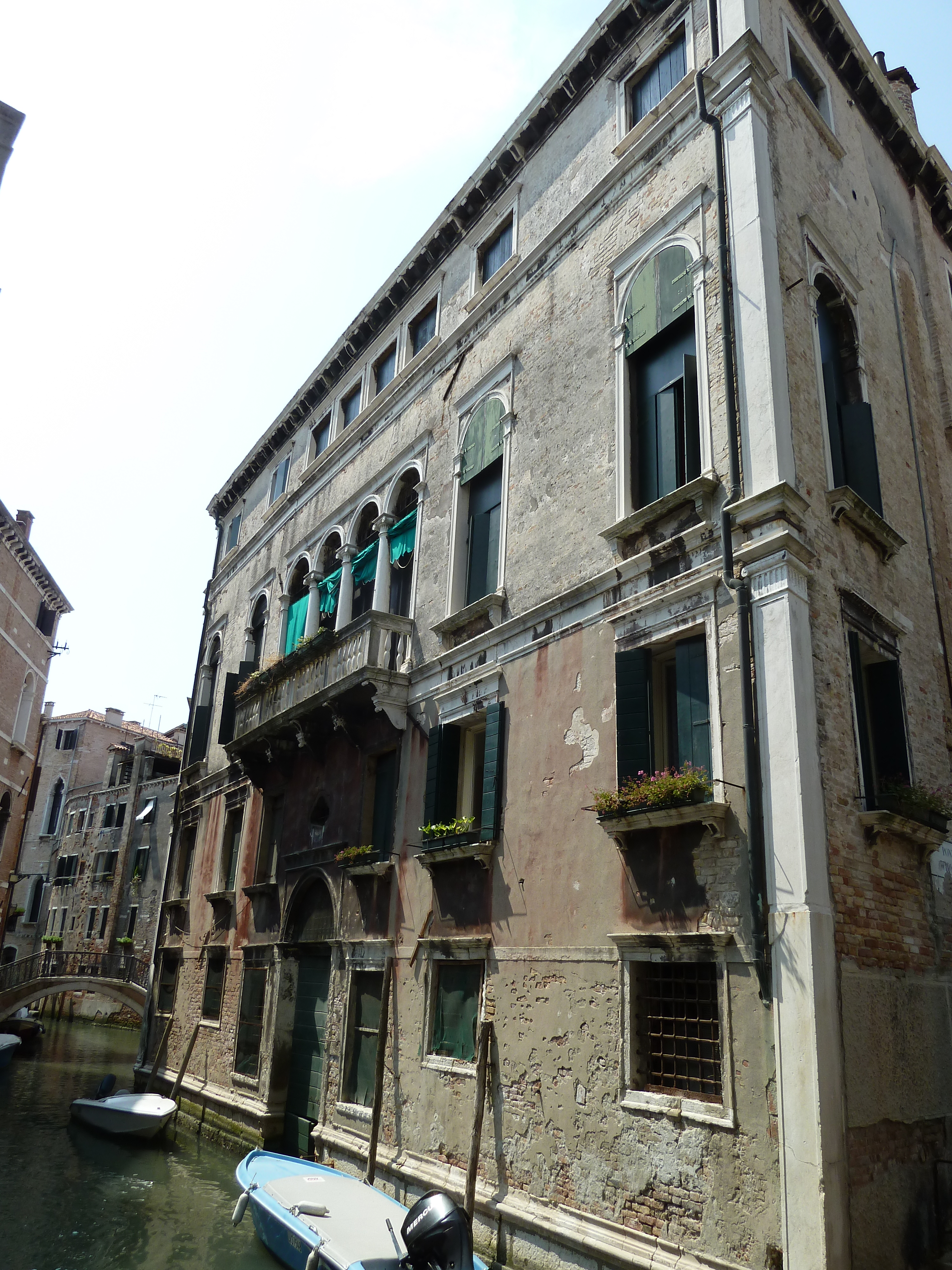
Clockwise from upper left: Palazzo Loredan at Campo Santo Stefano, Palazzo Loredan at Campo S. Maria Formosa, Palazzo Loredan Cini, Palazzo Loredan a San Cancian, Palazzo Giustinian Loredan, Palazzo Loredan Gheltoff.

Throughout history, the family was organised and divided into many branches, most of which were traditionally named after Venetian toponyms, usually parishes, as was common with Venetian nobility. Some of the branches are: Santo Stefano (extinct in 1767), San Pantaleone della Frescada, San Cancian, San Vio, Santa Maria (Formosa and Nova), San Luca, San Marcilian, Sant'Aponal etc. Pietro Loredan, a member of the San Cancian branch, is also the progenitor of the branches of Santa Maria Formosa and Nova by his sons Giacomo and Polo.

Santo Stefano

The family branch of Santo Stefano (also called San Vitale) was settled in the Palazzo Loredan in Campo S. Stefano. The progenitor of this branch is considered to be Gerolamo Loredan di S. Vitale, father of Doge Leonardo Loredan. Besides Leonardo, the branch also gave Doge Francesco Loredan, as well as Dogaressa Caterina Loredan and the ambassador Francesco Loredan. This branch was also significant as its members were feudal owners of the towns of Barban and Rakalj in Istria, which they acquired in an auction in 1535 for 14,700 ducats. The main (agnatic) line of the branch of Santo Stefano ended with Andrea di Girolamo Loredan, who died young in 1750, though the branch became extinct in 1767 with the death of Giovanni Loredan, brother of Doge Francesco.

San Pantaleone della Frescada

The family branch of San Pantaleone della Frescada was settled around the Church of San Pantaleone Martire in the Dorsoduro district of Venice, near the Rio della Frescada canal. This branch was the one that gave Doge Pietro Loredan.

San Cancian

The family branch of San Cancian was settled in the Palazzo Loredan a San Cancian in the Cannaregio district of Venice. This branch is known to have produced an illustrious dynasty of admirals and politicians including Pietro Loredan (1372–1438), Alvise Loredan (1393–1466), Giacomo Loredan (1396–1471), Giorgio Loredan (d. 1475), Antonio Loredan (1446–1514), as well as the Duke of Candia Giovanni Loredan (d. 1420).

Santa Maria

The family branch of Santa Maria draws its name from the parishes of Santa Maria Formosa and Santa Maria dei Miracoli, around which it was historically settled. Its progenitor is considered to be the admiral and procurator Pietro Loredan, by his sons Giacomo and Polo. One of its most notable members is Antonio Loredan, governor of Venetian Dalmatia, Albania and Morea, known for the successful defence of Scutari in 1474 from the Ottomans. He also served as the Captain General of the Sea in the Venetian navy, as did his father and grandfather. Giovanni Loredan, Lord of Antiparos, is significant for building the Castle of Antiparos in 1440 and bringing inhabitants to the island at his own expense. Taddea Caterina Loredan, Duchess of the Archipelago was the wife of Francesco III Crispo, known as the "Mad Duke", who murdered her in 1510. Giovanni Francesco Loredan was a writer and politician who played a significant role in the creation of modern opera with his Accademia degli Incogniti. Marco Loredan was a senator and politician, as well as Count of Brescia, Feltre, Rovigo, Salò and Famagusta.

San Vio

The family branch of San Vio (with the Palazzo Loredan Cini and the Villa Loredan Perocco) was historically settled in Campo San Vio in the Dorsoduro district of Venice. The branch still exists today.

== History ==
=== 13th century: Silk, spices and slavery ===
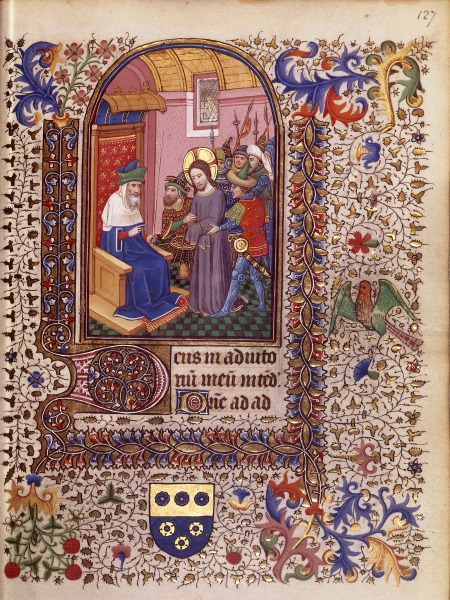
A medieval manuscript of the Loredan family

The Loredan family had been occupying hereditary seats on the Great Council since the Great Council Lockout (Serrata del Maggior Consiglio) of 1297, by which the membership in the Great Council of Venice became a hereditary title, and was limited to the families inscribed in the Golden Book of the Venetian nobility. This resulted in the exclusion of minor aristocrats and plebeians from participating in the Government of the Republic.

Like many Venetian patricians, the Loredans participated in the lucrative silk and spice trade, thus growing their wealth and influence, with Venice and other maritime republics monopolising European trade with the Middle East. The family also participated in the medieval slave trade, with Venice already having established slave trading operations centuries prior.

Around this time, documents from the 1290s show that two Loredans, Zanetto and Zorzi, were being sued by Christian merchants from Amalfi, presumably for involvement in piracy activities, as they had seized a vessel off the coast of Malta.

=== 14th century: Conspiracies and expansion of trade ===
Some members of the family played a part in the bloody Tiepoline conspiracy of 1310, which involved the Querini, Badoer and other families of the old aristocracy, in an attempt to overthrow the state, primarily the doge and the Great Council. Evidence indicates the Loredans initially supported the conspiracy, having recently married into the Tiepolo family. The plot failed due to treachery, bad planning, insufficient popular support and stormy weather. The rebels were stopped near Piazza San Marco by forces faithful to Doge Pietro Gradenigo and defeated. On the night before the uprising, particulars of the plot were unveiled to the doge and his advisors; the Loredans who were involved in the conspiracy passed cunningly to the other side, and to show their loyalty to the doge, they hounded the involved conspirators until they were found.

The Loredans are characterised by many interesting things and stories, one of which took place in the early 14th century: In 1316, Zanotto Loredan was seriously ill, so much so that it was thought he was dead, so the people took him to the church of San Matteo in Murano for burial. After the funeral rite, they wanted to deposit the body in the tomb, when someone noticed that the color of his face had changed. They took him to the convent hospital, warmed him and he recovered. Later he continued to live normally, married and had children.

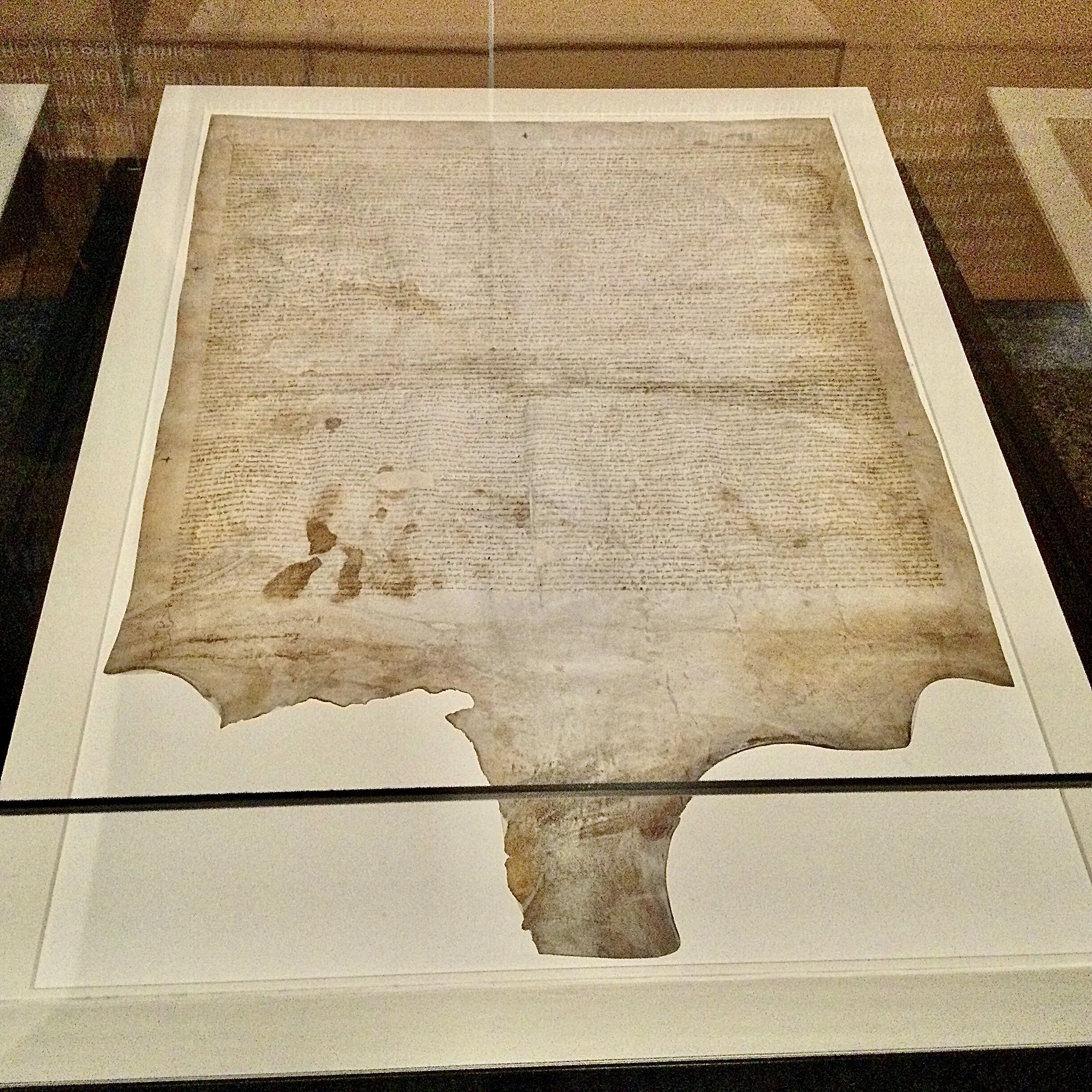
Parchment from the 1350 court case against the heirs of Giovanni Loredan, following the Voyage of the Loredan Brothers. The document formed the centrepiece of the 2025 exhibition "From Venice to Delhi: Six Merchants on the Silk Roads" at the Museum of Oriental Art in Ca' Pesaro, Venice.

On the influence exerted by the travels of the Marco Polo, new documents have come to light from archival research. From these it is noted that, starting as early as the 1320s, Venetian merchants flocked to Persia (where from 1324 Venice had its own consul in Tabriz), India and China, where they formed trade companies. Head of one of these companies was Giovanni Loredan, whose venture, known as the Voyage of the Loredan Brothers, is a representative example of a commenda, known in Venice as colleganza, an early form of limited partnership, which implied an agreement between an investing partner and a travelling partner to conduct a commercial enterprise, usually overseas. He began the journey alongside his brother Paolo and four other nobles in 1338 when they sailed on the galleys of Romania to Tana in order to embark upon a voyage to Delhi. Following the travels of the Polos, a number of Venetians travelled across Central Asia to China. However, striking out east from Tana and then heading south around the edge of the Pamir mountains to cross the Hindu Kush mountains to India had not been done before; it was trying something new. Before this, Giovanni Loredan had just come back from a trip to China, and his wife and children therefore tried to dissuade him from the new voyage. However, Giovanni believed that there was a fortune to be made by a visit to a certain Indian prince, who had a reputation for cruelty but also generosity to foreign merchants. Therefore, Giovanni, along with five other nobles who had joined in the venture, including his brother Paolo, pooled funds together in order to bring with them gifts, mechanical wonders such as a clock and a fountain, which they hoped would please the Indian prince. Each of them also took some wares on their own account, with Giovanni Loredan taking some Florentine cloth, a piece of which he sold along the way to pay for expenses. In order to raise his share of the needed funds, Giovanni also accepted money in the colleganza from his father-in-law, Alberto de Calle, who invested 6 ducats. Having made their way to Delhi, Giovanni and the other nobles succeeded in pleasing the Indian prince, as he gave them a rich present, which they then invested in a joint purchase of pearls. However, Giovanni and two other nobles died in the course of the journey. Giovanni's brother Paolo assumed his dead brother's obligations and continued the journey. On the way home, the pearls were divided among the surviving partners, but Giovanni was not there to make the most of the outcome that he had imagined before the voyage. After the nobles returned home to Venice, Giovanni's father-in-law, an early investor in the colleganza, sued the guardians of Giovanni's young sons to recover not only the value of his investment, but also the usual profits from such a voyage. Despite winning the case, he was almost certainly disappointed when he did not even double his initial investment in what had been projected to be a highly lucrative enterprise. The voyage of the Loredan brothers is one of the most popular anecdotes used by historians to depict the burgeoning of a global economy during that time.

One of the most notorious usurers of the time was Leonardo Loredan (d. 1349), loaning at interest rates of 65% to 100%. His representatives did not hesitate to put families out of their homes, he battened on war loans, and was arraigned by ecclesiastical courts to answer to charges of aggravated usury, but he always managed to confute the charges by means of gifts, bribery and occult levers. Later, much of his wealth went into building two Loredan palaces in the city.

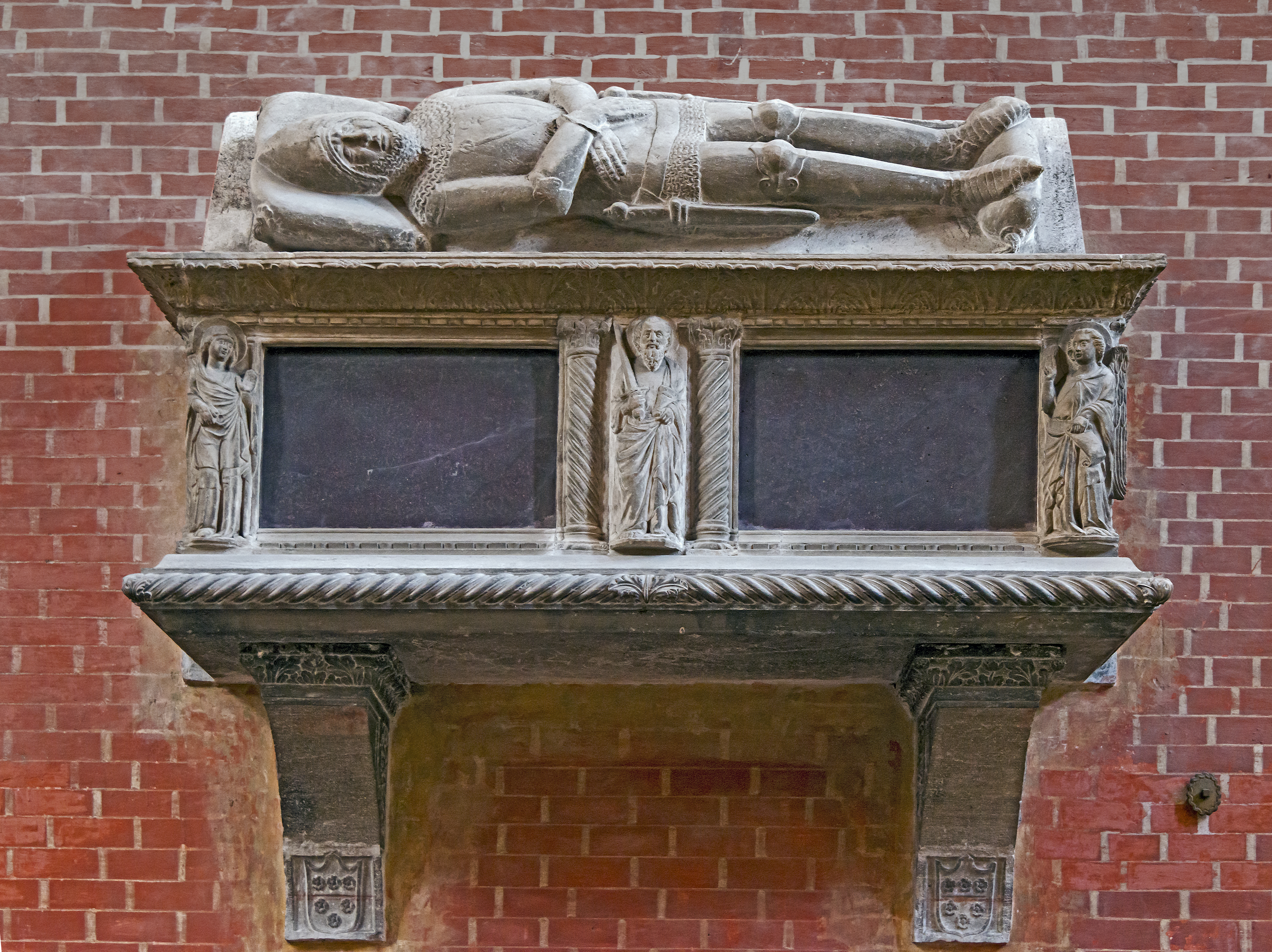
Tomb of Paolo Loredan (d. c. 1372), Basilica of Saints John and Paul

After the infamous failed 1355 Faliero coup that involved Doge Marino Faliero and his partners, including Filippo Calendario, which attempted to overthrow the republican government and establish a dictatorship, Andrea and Daniele Loredan managed to produce a testimony against Faliero, regarding his secret plots against the ruling class, after which they manipulated the Council of Ten and then led the call for his brutal torture. On the night of 17 April 1355, over the space of a few hours, they had Faliero questioned, framed, tortured and beheaded. They did all this despite the fact that Doge Faliero's mother was Beriola Loredan. Additionally, ten of his accomplices were hanged on display from the balcony of the Doge's Palace.

Marco Loredan, who lived in the 14th century was elected as Procurator of Saint Mark, one of the highest political positions in the Venetian Republic, and was one of the electors of Doge Andrea Dandolo. Contemporary to him are Paolo Loredan (d. 1372), a military general who distinguished himself in the highest military positions of land and sea, and Alvise Loredan, who also became Procurator of Saint Mark.

Giovanni Loredan (lat. Ioannes Lauredanus) served as the Bishop of Capo d'Istria (today Koper, Slovenia) from 1390 until his death on 11 April 1411. From 1354 he was the presbyter of Saint Mark's Basilica, Venice. He was appointed Bishop of Capo d'Istria on 21 November 1390. According to several church chronologies, before that he was also a bishop in Venice, in what was then the Diocese of Castello. It is recorded that in 1391 he dedicated the Church of St. George in Piran. He was buried in the Cathedral of the Assumption of the Blessed Virgin Mary in Koper. In some historical sources he is mentioned under the name of Giacomo or the Slovenian Jakob.

=== 15th century: Political and military rise ===
One of the important members of the family in the 15th century was Pietro Loredan (1372–1438), who was three times Captain General of the Sea; in 1416 he conquered several Dalmatian strongholds and later defeated the Ottomans at Gallipoli, capturing fifteen galleys; in 1431 he defeated the Genoese and Milanese in Rapallo, achieving the capture of eight galleys and General Francesco Spinola. Pietro died in 1439. He was buried in the Monastery of St. Helena, and the funeral inscription explicitly indicates poisoning as the cause of his death. Many historians identify the principal to be his long-time rival, Doge Francesco Foscari, whose enmity with the deceased Pietro was well-known. In the popular imagination, the names of the Foscari and Loredan remain linked to a sort of generational feud, partly documented, partly due to certain historiographic forcing; and yet it is undeniable how, in the crucial moments that marked the life of Francesco and his son Jacopo Foscari, a Loredan was always present.

Loredan's letter following the Battle of Gallipoli and addressed to the Doge of Venice has been preserved:

"I, as commander, vigorously attacked the first galley, which put up a stout defence, being excellently manned by courageous Turks who fought like dragons. With God's help I overcame her, and cut most of the said Turks to pieces. Yet it cost me much to save her, for others of their galleys bore down upon my port quarter, raking me with their arrows. Indeed, I felt them; for one struck me in the left cheek, just below the eye, piercing the cheek and nose; and another passed through my left hand. And these were only the serious wounds; I received many others about the body and also in my right hand, though these were of comparatively little consequence. I did not retire, nor would I have retired while life remained to me; but, still righting vigorously, I drove back the attackers, took the first galley and hoisted my flag in her... Then, turning suddenly about, I rammed a galleot, cutting many of her crew to pieces, put some of my own men aboard and again ran up my flag... Their fleet fought on superbly, for they were manned by the flower of the Turkish seamen; but by God's grace and the intercession of St. Mark our Evangelist we at last put them to flight – many of their men, to their shame, leaping into the sea... The battle lasted from early morning till past two o'clock; we took six of their galleys, with their crews, and nine galleots. And the Turks that were on them were all put to the sword, including the admiral and all his nephews and many other great captains... The battle over, we sailed beneath the walls of Gallipoli, bombarding them with missiles and calling on those within to come out and fight; but they would not. So we drew away, to allow the men to refresh themselves and dress their wounds... And aboard the captured vessels we found Genoese, Catalans, Sicilians, Provencals, and Cretans, of whom those who had not perished in the battle I myself ordered to be cut to pieces and hanged... together with all the pilots and navigators, so the Turks have no more of those at present. Among them was Giorgio Calergi, a rebel against your Grace, whom despite his many wounds I ordered to be quartered on the stern of my own galley – a warning to any Christians base enough to take service with the infidel henceforth. We can now say that the power of the Turk in this region has been utterly destroyed, and will remain so for a long time to come. I have eleven hundred prisoners..."

Tenedos, 2 June 1416

Excerpt from: Norwich, John Julius. A History of Venice

Pietro's son Giacomo Loredan was a general who served as Captain of the Gulf and three times as Captain General of the Sea in the Venetian Navy. He defeated the Ottomans in 1464.

Also significant at this time was Alvise Loredan (1393–1466), who became a galley captain at a young age and served with distinction as a military commander, with a long record of battles against the Ottomans, from the naval expeditions to aid Thessalonica, to the Crusade of Varna, and the opening stages of the Ottoman-Venetian war, as well as the Wars in Lombardy against the Duchy of Milan. The Loredans were proponents of Venice's traditional, maritime orientation, and viewed with distrust its expansion on the Italian mainland (the Terraferma), which had brought it into conflict with Milan. Alvise Loredan shared this view, as can be seen from a proposal he brought before the Great Council in February 1442, ordering the governors of Bergamo to demolish its fortifications as a sign of goodwill and trust towards Visconti, following the conclusion of peace with Milan at the Treaty of Cremona. He also served in a number of high government positions, as provincial governor, Savio del Consiglio, and Procuratore de Supra of Saint Mark's Basilica, and was Count of Bergamo and Belluno. He died in Venice on 6 March 1466, and was buried in the Church of Santa Maria dei Servi.

Giorgio Loredan (d. 1475) was an admiral, military general and politician, known for investigating political crimes and scandals as head of the Council of Ten. He was also Count of Zara, Chioggia and Padua.

Antonio Loredan (1420–1482) was captain of Venetian-held Scutari and governor in Split (Venetian Dalmatia), Venetian Albania and the Morea. He is famous for the successful defence of Scutari from Sultan Mehmed II's Ottoman forces led by Hadım Suleiman Pasha. According to some sources, when the Scutari garrison complained for lack of food and water, Loredan told them: "If you are hungry, here is my flesh; if you are thirsty, I give you my blood." He also served as the Captain General of the Sea and is notable for commissioning the Legend of Saint Ursula (1497/98), a series of large wall-paintings by Vittore Carpaccio originally created for Scuola di Sant'Orsola which was under the patronage of the Loredan family.

Giovanni Loredan, Lord of Antiparos built the Castle of Antiparos in 1440 and brought inhabitants to the island at his own expense. He married Maria Sommaripa, of the ruling family of Paros, and they had a daughter, Lucrezia Loredan, Lady of Ios and Therasia.

Marco Loredan, who was rector of various Aegean islands from 1452 to 1456, managed to establish Loredan control over Tinos and Mykonos during the second half of the 15th century through a series of events that led to the family's economic domination over those islands.

Andrea Loredan (1455–1499) was an admiral and the Duke of Corfù, best known for his successful exploits against pirates who raged across the Adriatic and the Mediterranean. He fought at sea against famous admirals such as Kemāl Reis, stealing from him multiple boats and destroying many by fire, and Pedro Navarro, whom he managed to wound after six hours of fierce battle in Roccella Ionica near Crotone in 1497. Andrea died on a burning ship while fighting against the Ottomans in the Battle of Zonchio in August 1499.

Antonio Loredan (1446–1514) was the Duke of Friuli, and ambassador to the Papal States, the Kingdom of France and the Holy Roman Empire.

In that same century, Luigi and Giacomo Loredan, both Procurators of Saint Mark, distinguished themselves with important political positions.

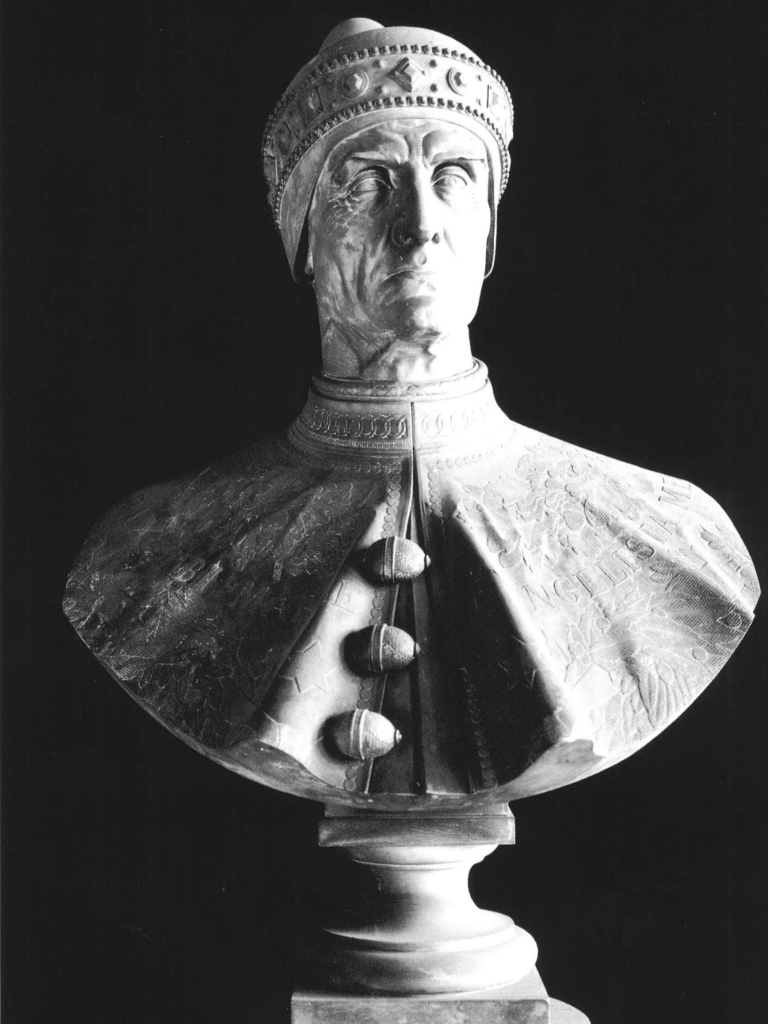
Bust of Leonardo Loredan, Palazzo Loredan at Campo Santo Stefano

Leonardo Loredan, born in 1436 to Gerolamo Loredan di S. Vitale and Donata Donà di Natale, was the first doge of the Loredan family. He had a good classical education, focusing on literature, after which he devoted himself to trade in Africa and the Levant to increase the family's finances, where he made his fortune. In 1461, he married Giustina Giustiniani, of the wealthy branch of S. Moisè, with whom he had nine children: Lorenzo (who became Procurator of St. Mark's), Girolamo (the only one to continue the branch), Alvise, Vincenzo (died in Tripoli in 1499), Bernardo, Donata, Maria (wife of Giovanni Venier, of the branch that gave birth to Doge Francesco Venier), Paola (wife of Giovanni Alvise Venier, descendant of Doge Antonio Venier), and Elisabetta.

Leonardo's political ascent began at the age of nineteen, when he became a lawyer in the "Giudici di Petizion", a magistracy concerned mainly with financial scandals and bankruptcies, for which he had Filippo Loredan as guarantor. During his political career, he held multiple high positions such as chamberlain of the Comùn, wise man of the council, podestà of Padua, and Procurator of Saint Mark's. On 31 March 1495, he was one of the three designated by Doge Agostino Barbarigo to negotiate the alliance between Venice, Pope Alexander VI, Holy Roman Emperor Maximilian I of Habsburg, the Spanish rulers Ferdinand V and Isabella I and the Duke of Milan Ludovico Maria Sforza (King Henry VII of England also joined), with the aim of countering the military operations of the King of France Charles VIII who had, almost without encountering military resistance, entered Naples in February. The army of the League, led by the Marquis of Mantua Francesco II Gonzaga, in the Battle of Fornovo on 6 July forced the French army to withdraw from Italian territory. In October of the same year, Loredan signed the agreement for the conduct of Niccolò Orsini, count of Pitigliano, to the services of the Republic of Venice as governor general of the land militias for the period of three to four years. In January 1497, Loredan, with the wise man of the Terraferma Lodovico Venier, ratified the surrender of Taranto on behalf of the Doge.

=== 16th century: The Ottomans and the League of Cambrai ===
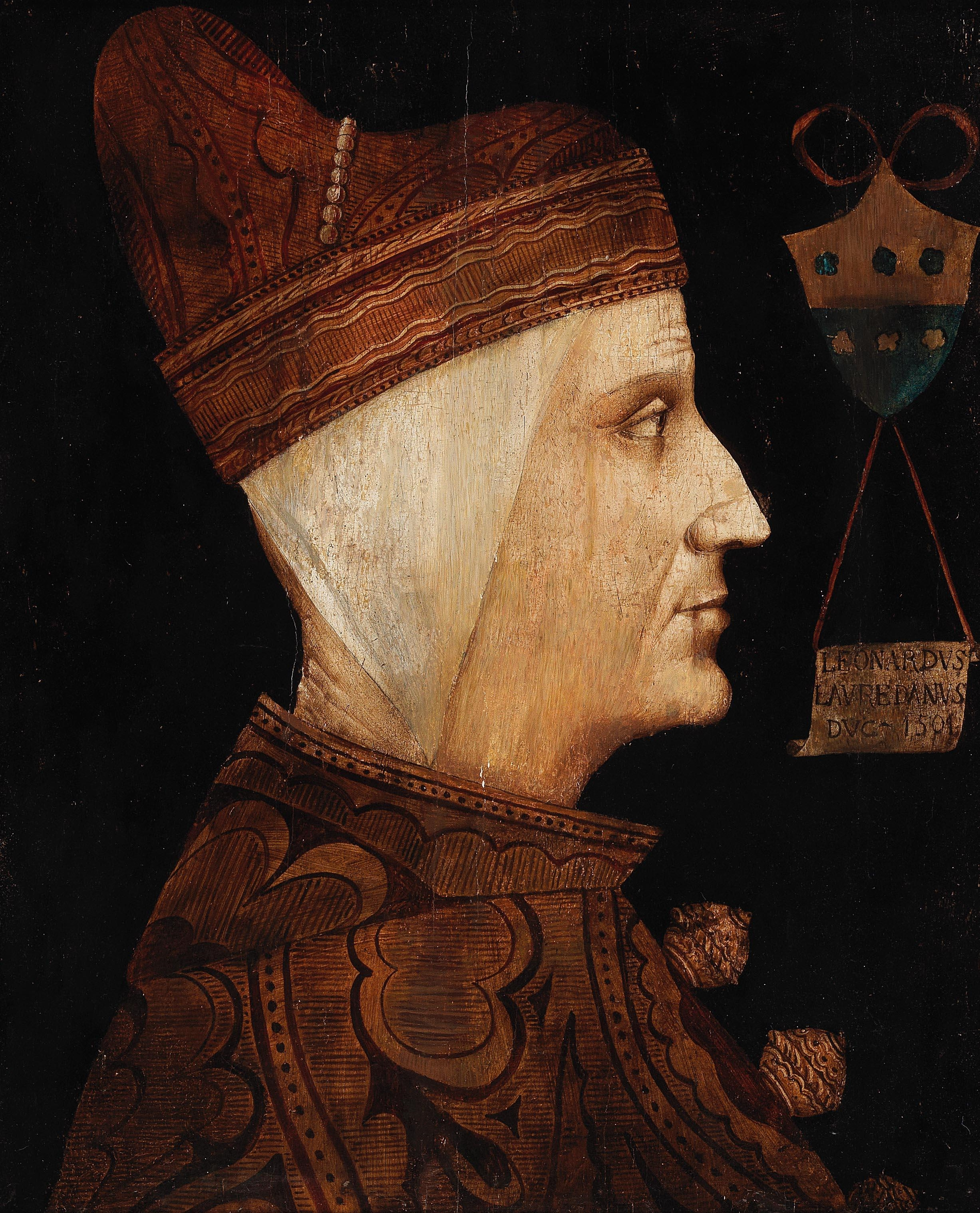
Portrait of Doge Leonardo Loredan, by Gentile Bellini, 1501, Dorotheum, Vienna

On the death of Doge Agostino Barbarigo (20 September 1501), Leonardo Loredan was one of the designated candidates in the election of the new doge, which began on 27 September and ended on 2 October with Loredan coming out first with 27 votes in the sixth hand of the first ballot. The election was successful thanks to his and his wife's influential relations and the sudden death of the most popular opponent, the wealthy procurator Filippo Tron, son of Doge Nicolò Tron. Leonardo became the 75th Doge of the Venetian Republic and his dogeship is considered one of the most important in the history of Venice.

==== Ottoman-Venetian War ====
At the time of his accession to the dogeship, Venice was engaged in the second Ottoman-Venetian war, and Leonardo had lost his cousin Andrea Loredan, a naval officer, in the disastrous Battle of Zonchio. The war proceeded badly on land too, with the Venetians losing considerable territory. This included the strategic city of Modon, which was the site of a bloody battle involving hand-to-hand combat, followed by the beheading of hundreds of Venetians following the Turkish victory. The war took a heavy toll on the Venetian economy, and in 1502/1503 Loredan agreed a peace treaty with the Ottomans. He was helped in negotiations by Andrea Gritti, a Venetian who had been conducting trade in Constantinople and would later become Doge of Venice himself.

==== War of the League of Cambrai ====
Upon the death of Pope Alexander VI in 1503, Venice occupied several territories in the northern Papal States. When Julius II was elected as Alexander's eventual successor, the Venetians expected their seizure of papal territory to be tacitly accepted, as Julius had been nicknamed Il Veneziano for his pro-Venetian sympathies. But instead the new Pope excommunicated the Republic and demanded the land be returned. The Republic of Venice, although willing to acknowledge Papal sovereignty over these port cities along the Adriatic coast and willing to pay Julius II an annual tribute, refused to surrender the cities themselves. In 1508, Julius formed an alliance called the League of Cambrai, uniting the Papal States with France, the Holy Roman Empire and several other Christian states.

The Doge's problems did not end in Europe. In 1509, the Battle of Diu took place, in India, where the Portuguese fleet defeated an Ottoman and Mameluk fleet, which had been transferred from the Mediterranean Sea to the Red Sea with Venetian help. The defeat marked the end of the profitable Spice trade, which was bought by Venetians from the Mameluks in Egypt and in turn monopolised its sale in Europe, reaping great revenues from it.

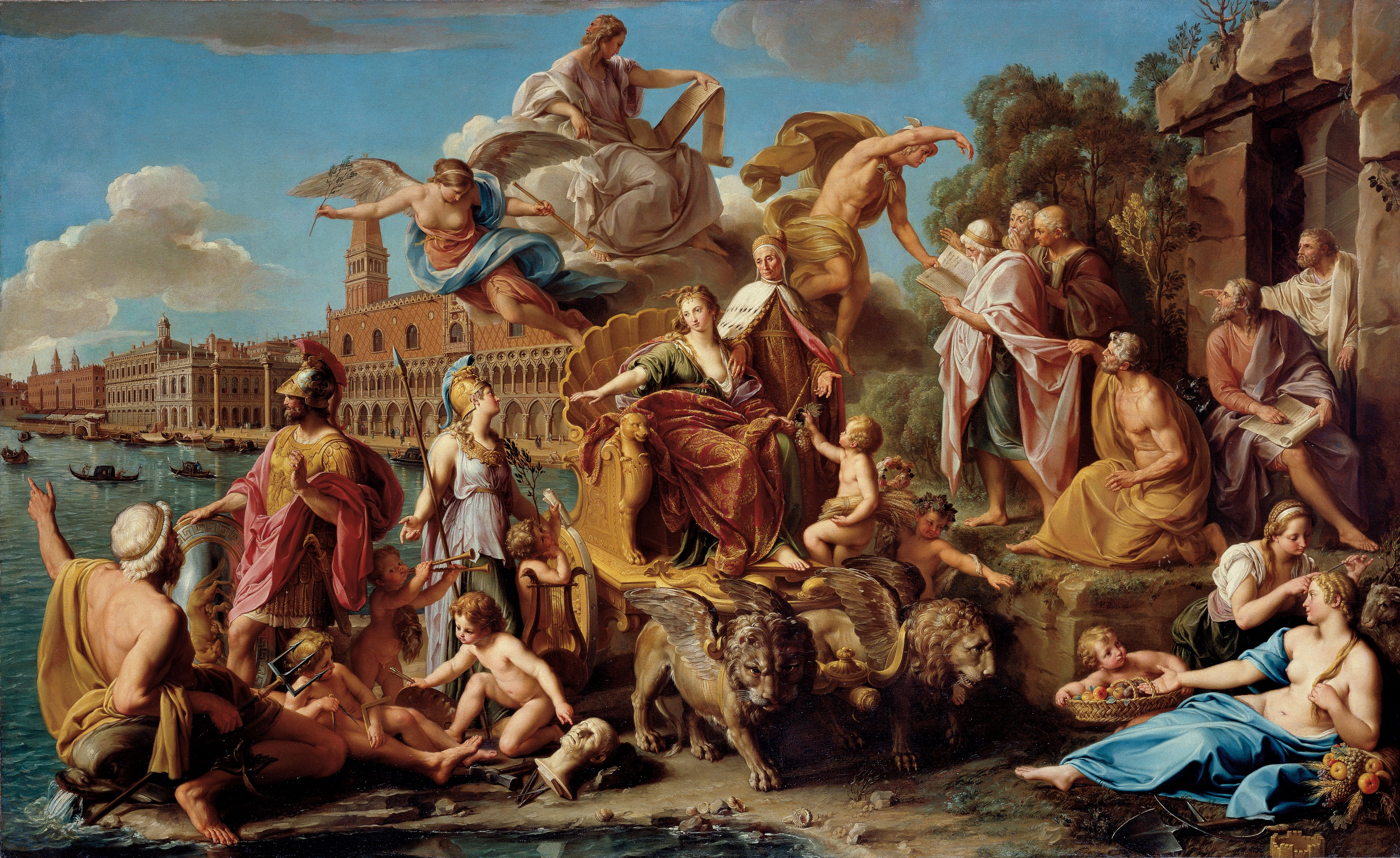
The Triumph of Venice, by Pompeo Batoni, 1737, featuring Doge Leonardo Loredan, North Carolina Museum of Art, Raleigh

After losing to the league's forces at the Battle of Agnadello, Venice found its holdings in Italy shrinking drastically. Soon Padua, Venice's most strategically vital Terraferma holding, had fallen, and Venice itself was threatened. Loredan united the population, calling for sacrifice and total mobilisation. Padua was retaken, though Venice was still forced to accept a reluctant peace, following which it joined the Pope as only a junior ally in his new war against the French. The alliance was on the verge of victory, but a dispute arose over territory. Emperor Maximilian refused to surrender any Imperial territory, which in his eyes included most of the Veneto, to the Republic; to this end, he signed an agreement with the Pope to exclude Venice entirely from the final partition. When the Republic objected, Julius threatened to reform the League of Cambrai. In response, Venice turned to Louis; on 23 March 1513, a treaty pledging to divide all of northern Italy between France and the Republic was signed at Blois. Under this alliance with the French King Louis XII, the Venetians achieved a decisive victory over the Papal States, and were able to secure back all the territories they had lost. In addition, the Papacy, namely Pope Leo X, a Medici, was forced to repay many outstanding debts to the Loredan family totalling approximately 500,000 ducats, an enormous amount of money.

Around this time, Leonardo's cousin Andrea Loredan, known as a collector of art, commissioned the Ca' Loredan Vendramin Calergi, a palace on the Grand Canal, to designs by Mauro Codussi. The palace was paid for by the doge. Andrea also commissioned and paid for the choir of the church of San Michele in Isola, also designed by Codussi. In 1513, during the War of the League of Cambrai, he had to accept the role of quartermaster-general for the army, and he died in the Battle of La Motta in the same year, beheaded by two soldiers who fought over his body.

The end of the war and the behavior of the doge, who perhaps thought he should enjoy the last years of his life rather than dedicate them to the administration of the state, led to a certain frivolity in Venetian society. Financial scandals were the order of the day and many public offices were bought at disproportionate prices rather than obtained on merit. In this period the doge bought titles and offices for children and relatives, making the most of his influence.

Despite Loredan's wishes, he could not lead this pleasant life for long as he began to experience health problems. Around the first days of June 1521 his health began to deteriorate and soon gangrene developed in his leg. Any intervention was useless and the gangrene spread, killing him in the night between 20 and 21 June. It is said that, to warn the councilors and regents of the state, the news of his death was silenced by the doge's own son and was communicated only in the late morning.

Interestingly, the commercialism and non-exemplary behaviour of his final years did not escape the watchful eye of the Inquisitors of the Dead, a magistracy created after the death of Francesco Foscari, charged with investigating the final "account" of the doge. Perhaps the trial was artfully mounted for political purposes but certainly there were incriminating motives, because the heirs of the doge, despite being defended by the lawyer Carlo Contarini, one of the best of the time, were sentenced to a hefty fine of 9,500 ducats.

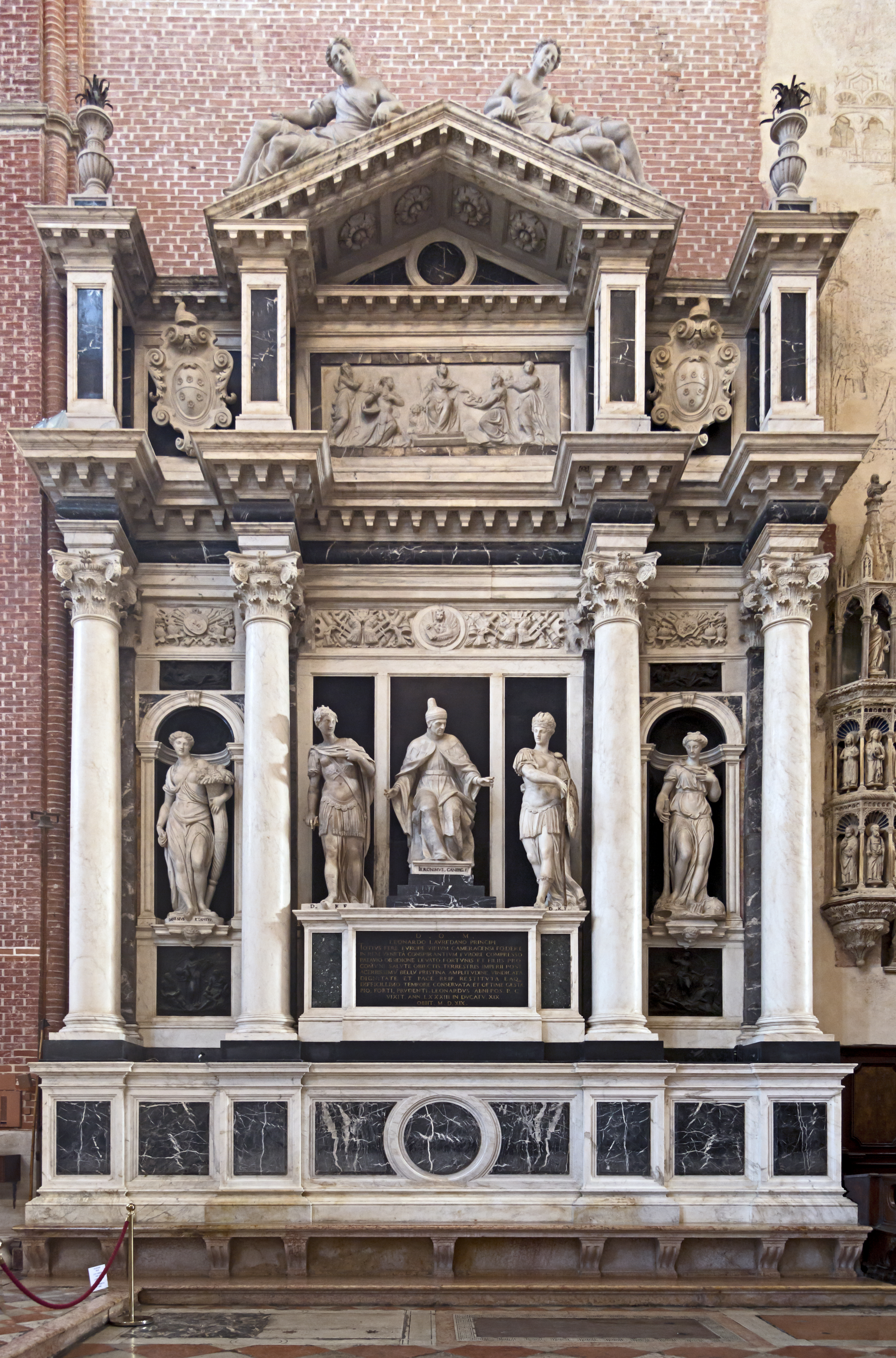
Tomb of Doge Leonardo Loredan, Basilica of Saints John and Paul

Leonardo Loredan died in Venice on 22 June 1521. The death, which occurred between eight and nine, was kept secret until sixteen at the behest of the children who, during their father's agony, had no regard for transporting furniture and objects from the doge's apartment to their residence. As is customary, the body was subjected to embalming practices. On the morning of 23 June, after the body was moved to the Piovego room of the Doge's Palace, the coffin was closed. At the solemn funeral the eulogy was read by the scholar Andrea Navagero, and Pietro Bembo, then abbot and secretary of Pope Leo X, was also present.

Loredan died "with great fame as a prince". He was interred in the church of Santi Giovanni e Paolo, in a simple tomb with a celestial marble headstone without inscription, placed above the steps of the main altar and now no longer existing. In about 1572, and after some disputes between the Loredan heirs and the friars of the church, a funeral monument was erected for him, divided into three parts and adorned with Corinthian columns in Carrara marble, placed to the left of the main altar, with architecture by Girolamo Grappiglia, and adorned with an extremely lifelike statue, an early work by the sculptor Girolamo Campagna, which depicts him in the act of "getting up and boldly throwing himself in defence of Venice against Europe conspired in Cambrai". On its right was the statue of Venice with sword in hand and on the left that of the League of Cambrai, with the shield adorned with the heraldic coats of arms of the opposing powers (these, and the others in the monument were done by Danese Cattaneo, a pupil of Sansovino).

In the dramatic events of the early 16th century, Loredan's Machiavellian plots and struggles against the League of Cambrai, the Ottomans, the Mamluks, the Pope, the Republic of Genoa, the Holy Roman Empire, the French, the Egyptians and the Portuguese saved Venice from downfall.

Numerous portraits of Doge Leonardo Loredan have been painted, most famous of which are those by Giovanni Bellini and Vittore Carpaccio. The Panegyricus Leonardo Lauredano was created in 1503 in his honour.

Leonardo Loredan was succeeded by Doge Antonio Grimani in 1521, who was married to Leonardo's sister, Dogaressa Caterina Loredan: "The Loredanian tradition for patriotism and nobility was handed on in the gracious personage of Dogaressa Caterina Loredan, sister of Doge Leonardo Loredan—the Consort of his successor Doge Antonio Grimani." They had several children, including cardinal Domenico Grimani.

Taddea Caterina Loredan, Duchess of the Archipelago, known as "a lady of wisdom and great talent", was the wife of Francesco III Crispo, who was mentally ill and was known as the "Mad Duke". Francesco attacked her in August 1510; Taddea tried to escape from him, and she fled to the castle of her cousin Lucrezia Loredan, Lady of Ios and Therasia, where Francesco had followed her a day later and attacked her again, on 17 August 1510, now murdering her. Their son John IV Crispo became the next Duke of the Archipelago in 1517, after a regency period during which he was still too young to rule. A 1908 book by historian William Miller titled The Latins in the Levant, a History of Frankish Greece indicates that the regent of the Duchy from 1511 to 1517 was Taddea's brother Antonio Loredan.

In 1535, Venice ceded the town of Barban in Istria (today part of Croatia) to the Loredan family, which had acquired it in an auction, as a heritable possession. The family made it their summer residence.

In 1536, the Loredan family acquired what would soon become the Palazzo Loredan in Campo Santo Stefano. Before the restoration by the architect Antonio Abbondi, it was a group of adjacent buildings, in the Gothic style, belonging to the Mocenigo family. The purchased buildings were substantially restored and made into a single building for the residence of the Loredans of Santo Stefano.

Marco Loredan (1489–1557) was a senator and politician, as well as Count of Brescia, Feltre, Rovigo, Salò and Famagusta, presiding over a time of famine and poverty following the War of the League of Cambrai.

Marco Loredan (d. 1577) was a priest and senator who was appointed by Pope Julius II as the Bishop of Nona (today Nin, Croatia), a position which he held from 1554 to 1577. He was also appointed by Pope Gregory XIII as the Apostolic Administrator and Archbishop of Zara (today Zadar, Croatia), where he stayed from 1573 until his death on 25 June 1577.

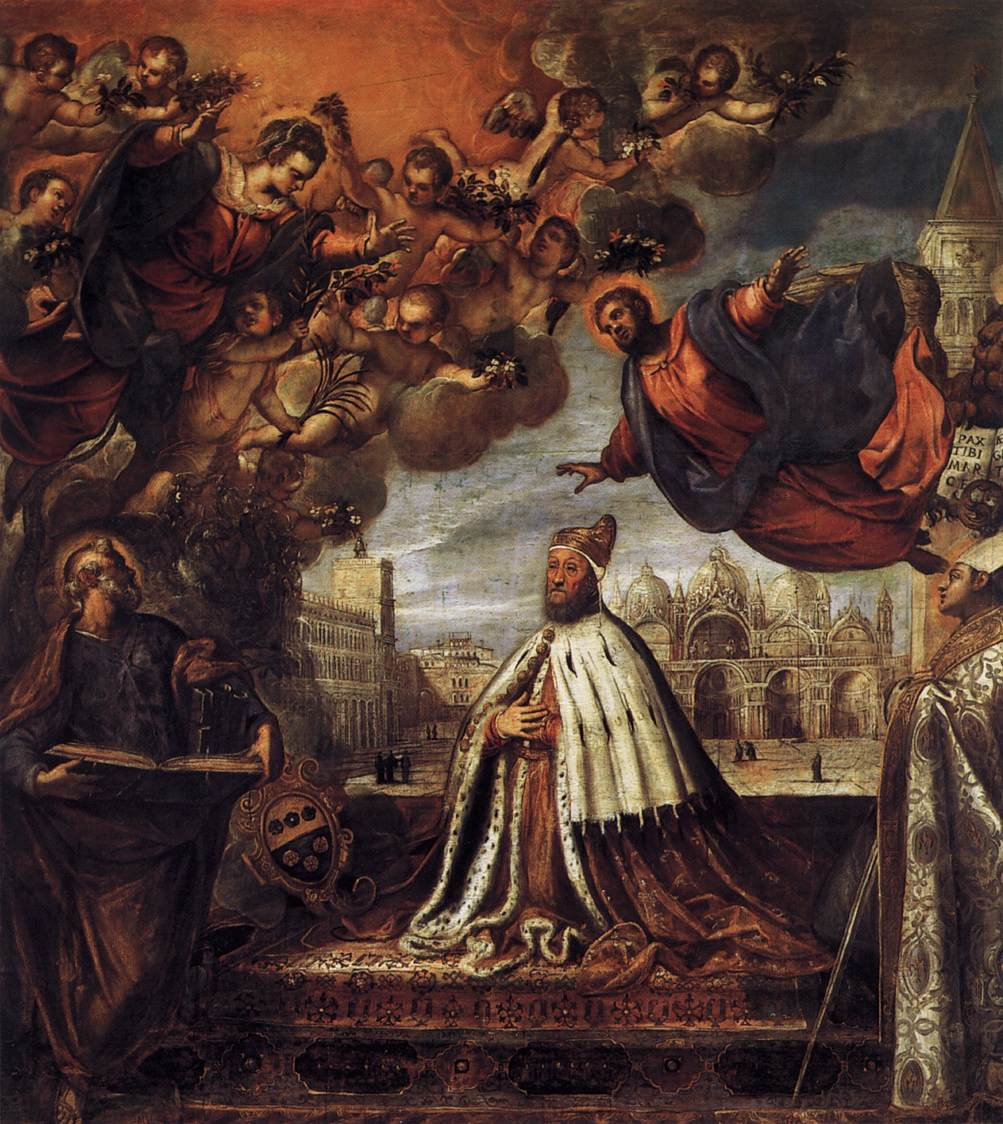
Doge Pietro Loredan Beseeching the Virgin, by Palma il Giovane, 1595, Doge's Palace, Venice

Pietro Loredan, born in 1482, became the 84th Doge of Venice and the second doge that the Loredan family gave. He was the third son of Alvise di Polo di Francesco Loredan, and his mother, Isabella Barozzi, came from one of the oldest Venetian noble families. Pietro had an intense but not necessarily prestigious political career, which he accompanied with the care of commercial interests according to the family tradition. Pietro married Maria Pasqualigo, and then Maria Lucrezia di Lorenzo Capello, with whom he had a son, Alvise Loredan (1521–1593), who continued the lineage with numerous offspring.

Present in 1509 and in 1510 in the defense of Padua and Treviso, he made his debut in public life in 1510 as a sopracomito. In April 1511 he was elected a Senator, and he intervened in the Senate, asking for the reduction of the sum that the Jews had to pay for their "conduct" and ruled in favor of a league with France, also willing to sell Cremona and Ghiara d'Adda in exchange for other territories. In 1513 he left again to defend Padua and Treviso and, available for military roles, he offered to fill the positions of administrator of the Stradioti and the administrator of Adria. He refused his appointment as consul in Alexandria in 1516, when he intensified his entrepreneurial activity: in 1517 Pietro, together with his brothers, armed a ship to transport pilgrims to the Holy Land and the following year he set up a market galley on the Alexandria route.

Business did not, however, distract him from public service, as evidenced by the various candidacies and the appointment in the College of the Twenty Wise Men, while his financial fortune allowed him to enter the committee of guarantors of Banco Priuli. In 1545 he was one of the nine electors of Doge Francesco Donà; between 1546 and 1549 he ran several times for the Council of Ten, in which, after another stint in the Senate (1549), he entered at the beginning of 1550, becoming its head. Later in the year he became ducal councilor for the Dorsoduro district. In the 1550s, Pietro consolidated his personal prestige, sat assiduously in the Senate, in the Council of Ten, as well as in the Signoria as ducal councilor. In 1559 he was included among the forty-one electors of Doge Girolamo Priuli.

On 29 November 1567 he was elected doge, which came as a surprise for him. "A man of 85 years, but very prosperous.", wrote of him the papal nuncio Giovanni Antonio Facchinetti, who would later become Pope Innocent IX. Considered a figure of little political importance, his dogeship was considered the most suitable because it was transitory and politically harmless. Religious and morally upright, educated, and of uncommon wisdom, Pietro was reluctant at the beginning, but in the two and a half years of his reign showed recognized qualities of balance and prudence.

Pietro Loredan died on 3 May 1570. On the 7th, the state funeral was organised in San Marco, instead of Santi Giovanni e Paolo, due to bad weather. Pietro's body was carried in the cloister of S. Giobbe and buried in the family ark.

Doge Pietro Loredan was portrayed in the ducal palace by Domenico Tintoretto and the painting placed in the Senate room, and by Jacopo Tintoretto for the one in the Scrutinio room.

In 1581 the Loredan family, namely the heirs of Andrea Loredan, sold the famous Palazzo Loredan Vendramin Calergi for 50,000 ducats to Eric II, Duke of Brunswick-Lüneburg who took loans to afford it.

In 1598, an incident occurred which resulted in an urban legend known as The Ghost of Fosco Loredan. In a burst of anger resulting from jealousy of his wife Elena who attracted many suitors, in this case her cousin of the Mocenigo family, Fosco Loredan murdered her at Campiello del Remèr by decapitating her, and was then ordered by her uncle, Doge Marino Grimani, to walk to Rome while carrying her disfigured body on his back to ask for the Pope's forgiveness, as he was the only one who could grant it to a noble of the rank of Loredan. After hearing the story, Pope Clement VIII did not want to see him, and, out of desperation, Fosco escaped the guards who were going to imprison him and went back to Venice, where he drowned himself in the Grand Canal. Supposedly, on the anniversary of his wife's killing, his ghost can be seen wandering the streets of Venice at night searching for peace, the peace he lost in the burst of anger on the night he murdered his young wife.

=== 17th century: Opera and the Accademia ===
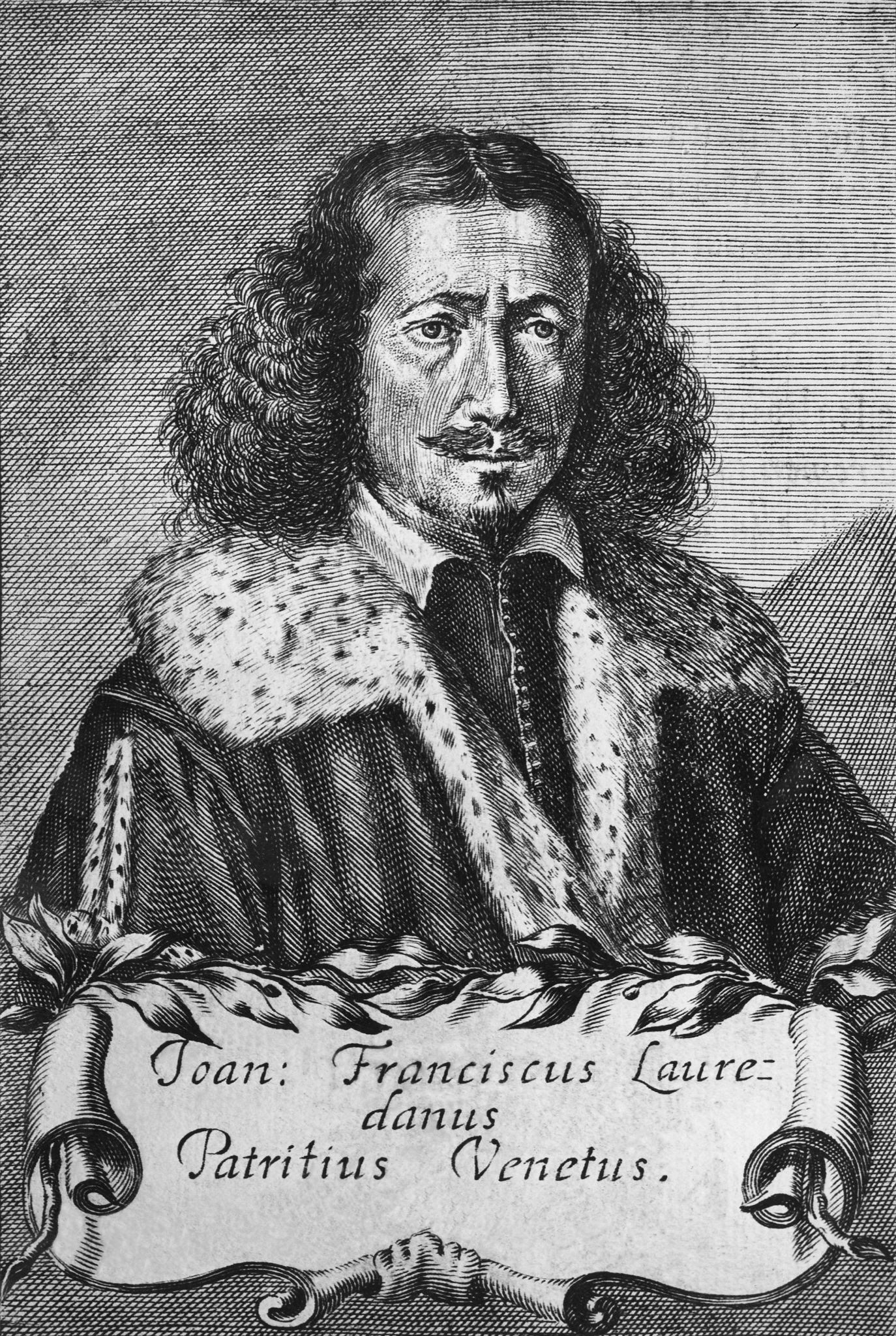
Portrait of Giovanni Francesco Loredan, by Giacomo Piccini, 1647, Rijksmuseum, Amsterdam

Giovanni Francesco Loredan, born in 1607, was a writer and politician. He was born in Venice as the son of Lorenzo Loredan and Leonora Boldù. When both of his parents died while he was very young, he was raised by his uncle Antonio Boldù and had as his teacher Antonio Colluraffi.

He divided his youth between hard study and an extravagant lifestyle. He attended the classes of renowned Aristotelian philosopher Cesare Cremoni in Padua and began, before 1623, to gather around him the group of scholars who then formed the Accademia degli Incogniti, also called the Loredanian Academy. As founder of the Accademia degli Incogniti and a member of many other Academies, he had close contact with almost all the scholars of his time. He and his circle played a decisive role in the creation of modern opera. In addition to literary activity, he also took part in public affairs. At twenty he was recorded in the Golden Book, but his career began quite late: in September 1632 he was elected 'Savio agli Ordini' and in 1635 he was Treasurer of the fortress of Palmanova. On his return he reorganized the Accademia degli Incogniti (1636) and, in 1638, despite attempts to avoid it, he was obliged, as the only descendant of his branch, to contract marriage with Laura Valier. He was then Provveditore ai Banchi (1640), 'Provveditore alle Pompe' (1642), and in 1648 he made the leap to the rank of avogador del Comùn that he held several times (1651, 1656 and 1657) and 'Provveditore alle Biave'(1653). He subsequently joined the offices of the State Inquisitor and became a member of the Council of Ten. In 1656 he entered the Minor Consiglio, that is, among the six patricians who, together with the doge, composed the Serenissima Signoria. However, he may then have been pushed out of office, as in the following years he no longer held important positions. In 1660 he was a Provveditore in Peschiera. The following year (13 August 1661) he died.

Dogaressa Paolina Loredan was the daughter of Lorenzo Loredan and wife of Doge Carlo Contarini, whom she married on 20 February 1601 in the Church of San Polo. She was an "immensely stout woman and incredibly plain-looking", and therefore she decided not to appear in public due to fear of being mocked by the populace. On the façade of the Church of San Vitale, Giuseppe Guoccola sculptured the busts of Doge Carlo and Dogaressa Paolina Loredan, placed there in gratitude of their noble bequests to the clergy.

Interestingly, near the Palazzo Contarini-Sceriman and the nearby bridge, Leonardo Loredan (d. 1675) was found dead in a boat. The unexplained death was the source of many rumors, claiming accidental death, murder by relatives, or murder by the Inquisitors of the Republic.

In the second half of the century, his son Francesco Loredan (1656–1715) is notable as he was the Venetian ambassador to Vienna during the Treaty of Karlowitz peace negotiations.

=== 18th century: Wealth, Enlightenment and the Republic's decline ===
In June 1715, at the end of his last assignment, as a reformer at the University of Padua, Francesco Loredan fell ill and after twenty-two days he died, in the Palace of Santo Stefano, on 10 July 1715. He remained unmarried, and left a very respectable inheritance, increased over the years, despite the huge expenses incurred for the embassy, and consisting of properties in Venice and vast land holdings, embellished with prestigious manor houses, in the Venetian area, around Treviso and Padua, in the Veronese area and in the territories of Rovigo and Polesine, to his brother, Giovanni, also unmarried, and to his nephews, children of his brother Andrea.

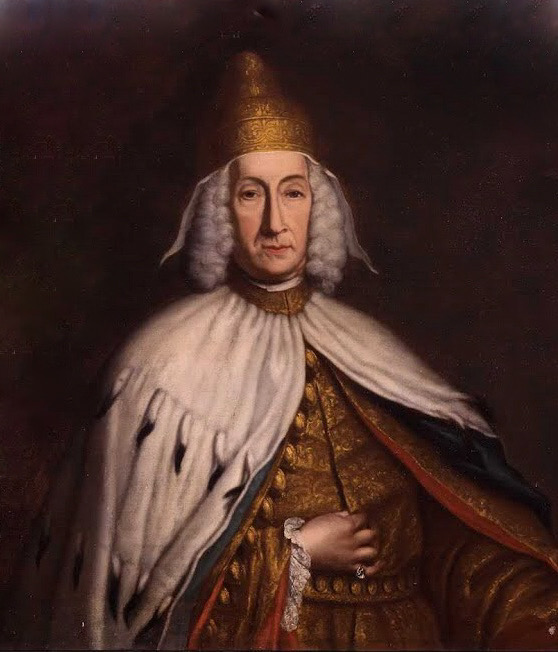
Portrait of Doge Francesco Loredan, by Jacopo Guarana

Francesco Loredan, born in 1685, was the 116th Doge of Venice and the third and last of the Loredan family. He served as Doge from 18 March 1752, until his death on 19 May 1762. Loredan was elected doge on 18 March 1752 but the announcement was made on 6 April, postponed because of Easter. By this point, the dogal figure had lost nearly all his power and he quickly adapted to this new situation. As Giacomo Nani wrote in 1756, Loredan was able to face the burdens of becoming doge and exercising the office because his family was one of those of the "first class", that is, "very rich" families. Prodigal and generous, he was described "father of the poor" in two paintings by Pietro Longhi. He did not have a particular interest in culture and had a limited library showing only a certain activism in the artistic field; in addition to being portrayed by minor painters such as Bartolomeo Nazzari and Fortunato Pasquetti, he designed the reconstruction of the commercial maps of territories and countries in the Sala dello Scudo in the ducal palace and the portraits of the last forty-six doges in the Sala dello Scrutinio. He also had Giuseppe Angeli fresco part of the noble floor of the family palace in S. Stefano. However, his more constant interest than himself was the management of the family estate, which at the time included numerous palaces and vast land holdings. One of the biggest issues in domestic politics at the time was the clash between the conservatives and the reformers. The latter wanted to substantially reform the Republic and sought to build internal reforms. The conservative pressure groups were able to block these plans and imprisoned or exiled the reformist leaders, such as Angelo Querini, an important figure of the Venetian Enlightenment. The Doge did not want to show favour to one side or the other, so he remained totally passive and limited his support to making it easier for the winning side, thereby losing his chance to change the fate of the dying republic. By impeding the development of the reformist ideas, he possibly caused the small economic boom which started around 1756 with the outbreak of the Seven Years' War. The neutrality of the Republic during this time allowed the merchants to trade in huge markets without competitors. The French defeat even allowed Venice to become the biggest market for eastern spices.

Interestingly, in 1752, Francesco offered the Palazzo Loredan dell'Ambasciatore as a residence for the ambassador of the Holy Roman Empire, and the first Imperial ambassador to live there was Count Philip Joseph Orsini-Rosenberg. In 1759, Loredan was awarded the Golden Rose by Pope Clement XIII, becoming the first and only doge to obtain the award.

At one point the Doge, who was old and tired by then, seemed about to die but recovered and lived for another year, until his death on 19 May 1762. The funeral took place on 25 May, and he was buried in the basilica of Santi Giovanni e Paolo, in Leonardo Loredan's dogal tomb. The funeral cost an impressive sum of around 18,700 ducats, and was paid for by Francesco's brother Giovanni.

Interestingly, the author and adventurer Giacomo Casanova was locked in the notorious lead chambers under Francesco Loredan's government in 1755 for suspicious activities, from which he managed his spectacular escape.

During this time, the Loredan family was incredibly wealthy and owned numerous palaces.

The main line of the family branch of Santo Stefano ended in 1750 with Andrea di Girolamo Loredan who died young, and the branch became extinct in 1767 with the death of Giovanni Loredan, brother of Doge Francesco.

=== 19th century: After the fall of Venice ===
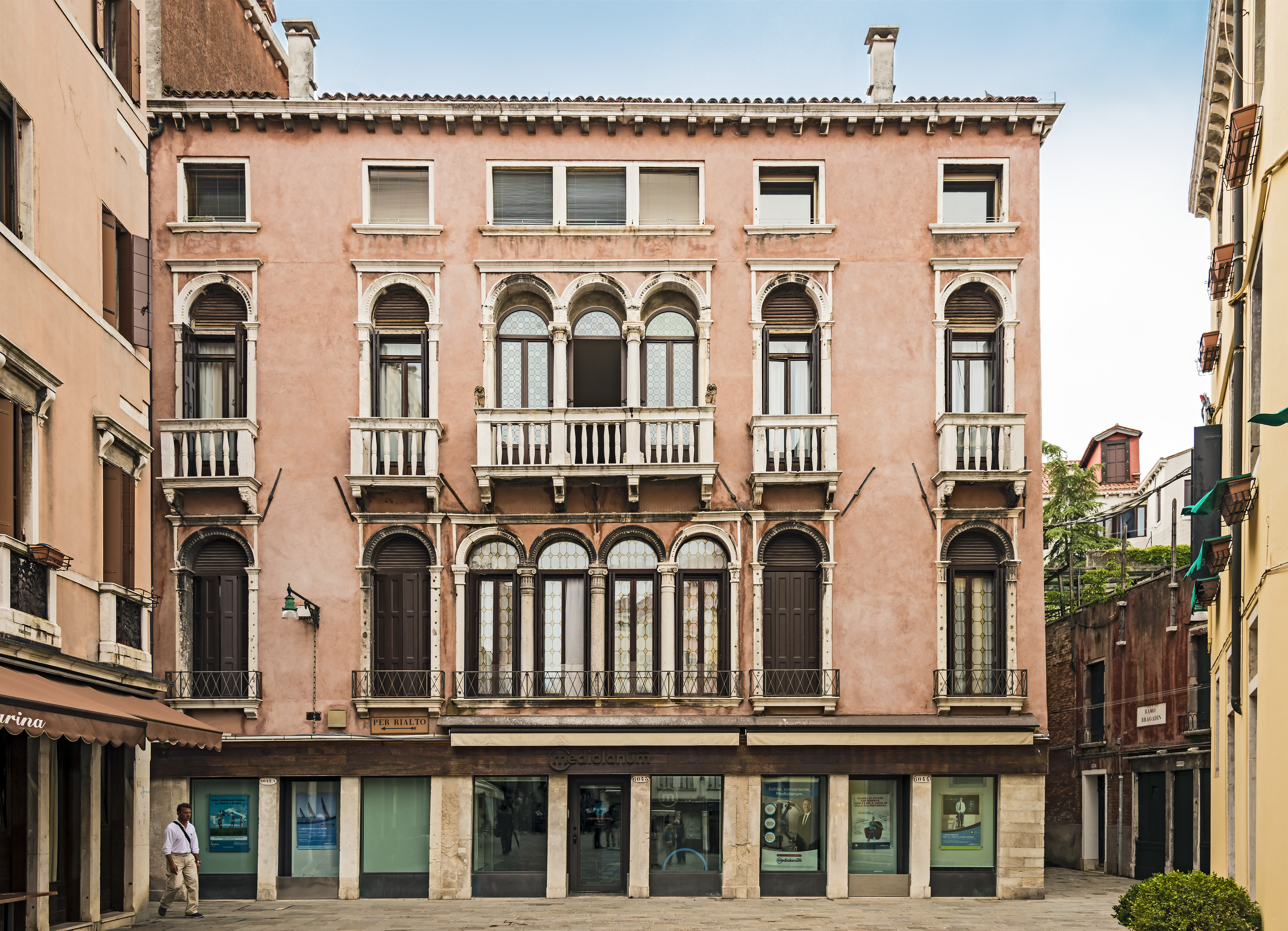
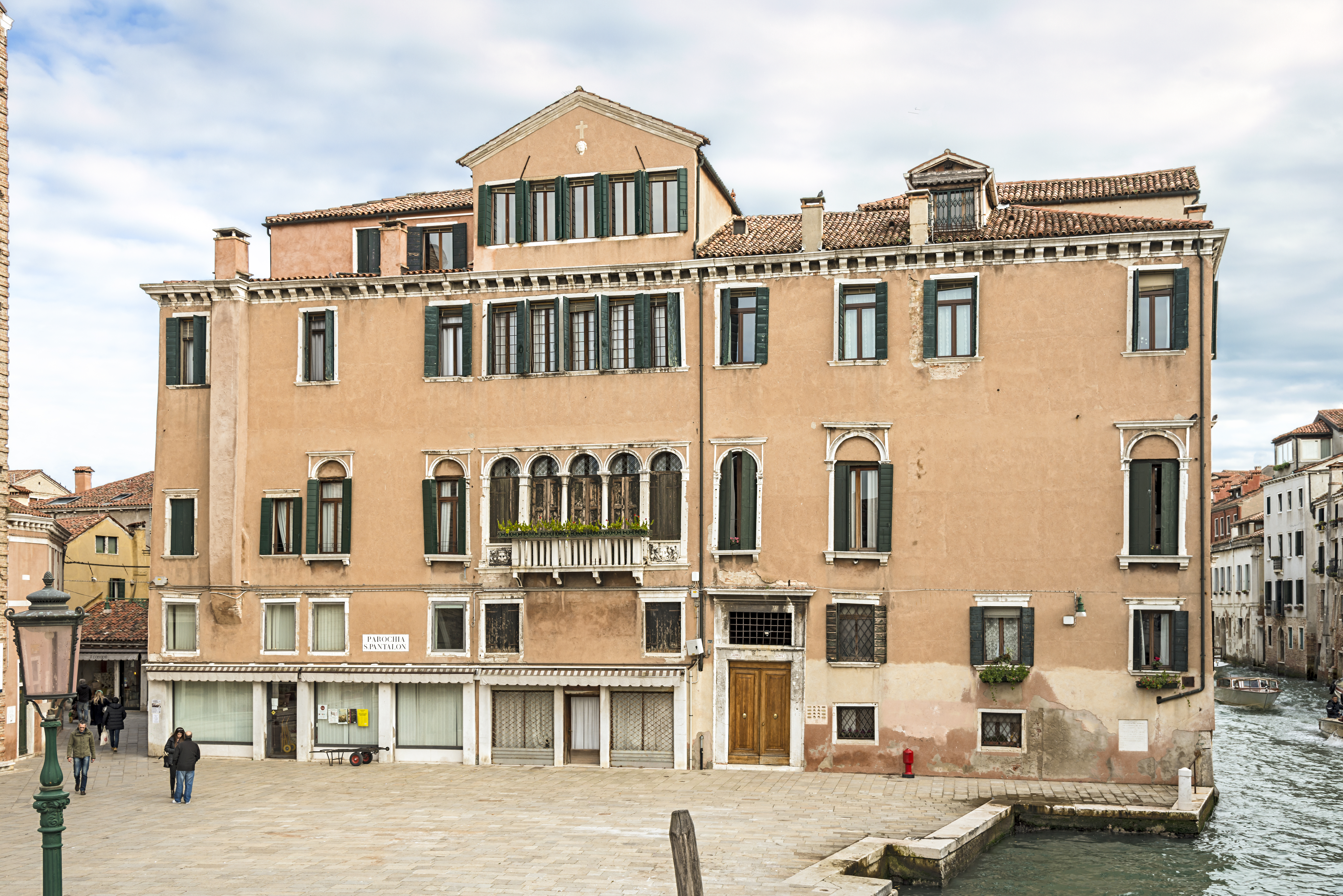
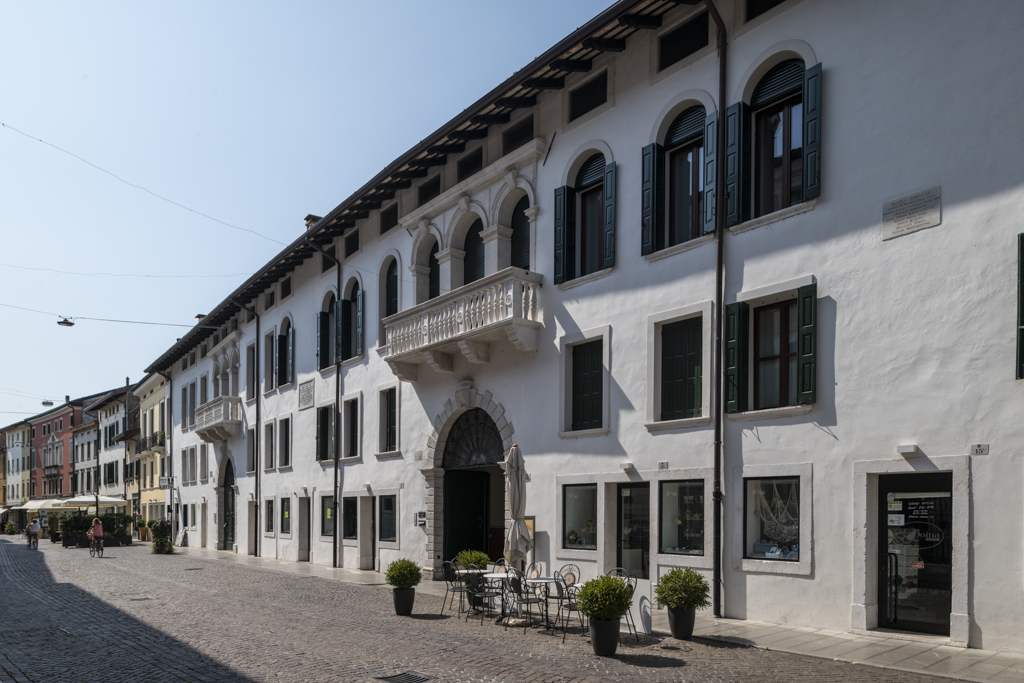
Palazzo Loredan a Santa Marina in Castello, Palazzo Signolo Loredan in Dorsoduro, and Palazzo Loredan Porcia in Pordenone, Friuli

After the fall of the Republic of Venice in 1797, some branches of the family were named on the basis of Venetian toponyms: San Luca, San Giovanni in Bragora, San Pantaleone etc.

Antonio Francesco di Domenico Loredan held the title of count in the Austrian Empire, and his brothers were also listed in the official list of nobles.

Teodoro Loredan Balbi (Krk, 7 November 1745 – Novigrad, 23 May 1831) was the last Bishop of Novigrad, a position which he held from 1795 until his death on 23 May 1831. He was ordained a priest in 1768. His uncle, the Bishop of Pula, Giovanni Andrea Balbi, appointed him a canon scholastic, prosinodal examiner and inquisitor in his diocese. In 1795 he received his doctorate in theology from the University of Padua, and in the same year Pope Pius VI appointed him as Bishop of Novigrad. Sudden political changes caused by the Napoleonic Wars soon followed: the collapse of the Venetian Republic in 1797, a brief change in Austrian and French rule, and the eventual establishment of Austrian rule in Istria after the Congress of Vienna in 1815. Although he did not get involved in the political events of the time, Napoleon's authorities detained him for 10 months in Venice after a trial, where he experienced all sorts of humiliations. After returning to the seat, he was for a time the only bishop in Istria and, under the authority of the Holy See, he visited the dioceses of Poreč and Pula. At the suggestion of Holy Roman Emperor Francis I, Pope Leo XII abolished the Diocese of Novigrad in 1828, which became part of the Diocese of Trieste, but, according to the Pope's order, only after Teodoro's death. As a bishop he sent three letters to the Holy See, in 1798, 1802 and 1807; in them he reported that in the diocese there were one cathedral and one choir church, 17 parishes, and many fraternities; that he opened a seminary and a pawnshop, founded a canonry of theologians and penitents, etc. He was buried in the church of St. Agatha in Novigrad, and his remains were transferred in 1852 to the bishop's tomb in the cathedral.

=== 20th century: Villas and wineries ===
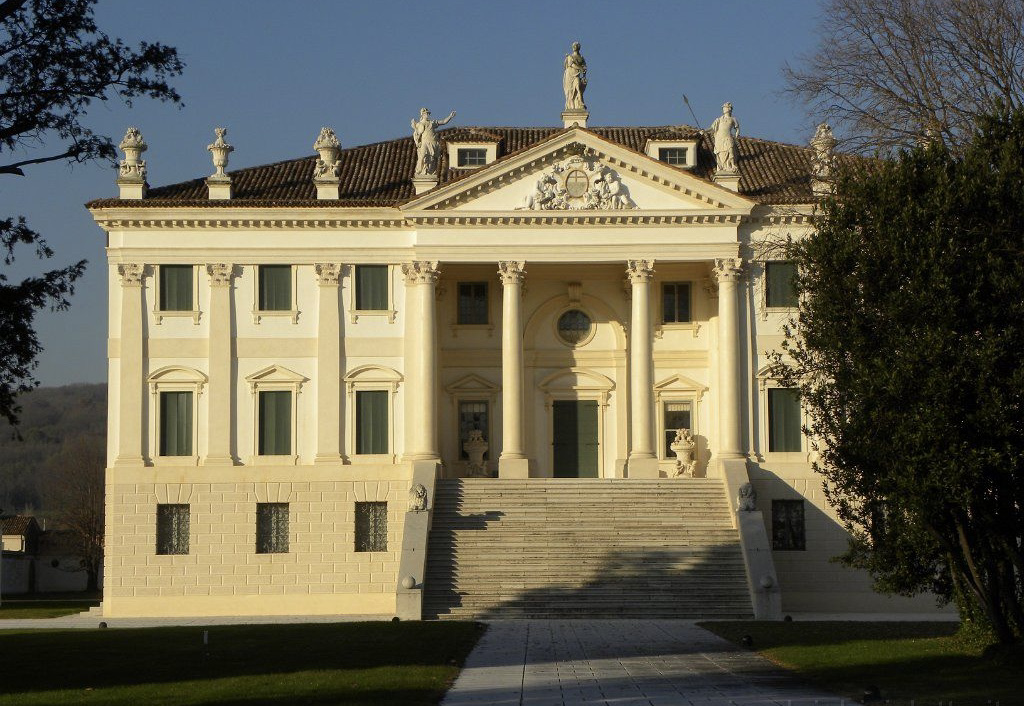
Villa Loredan at Paese

In the 1950s, Count Piero Loredan, descendant of Doge Leonardo Loredan, founded the Conte Loredan Gasparini winery. He chose the territory of Vignigazzu to establish his home in a grand Palladian villa—The Villa Loredan at Paese. The winery is located in Venegazzù di Volpago del Montello, in the Veneto region, in the heart of the Marca Trevigiana, an area famous for the production of wines since the 16th century.

In the 1960s, Countess Nicoletta Loredan Moretti degli Adimari founded the Barchessa Loredan winery, located in Selva del Montello, within a 16th-century Palladian barchessa. The Barchessa Loredan is a magnificent example of Palladian architecture. The noble residence was built in the 16th century; originally it was part of a vast complex which also included a large villa destroyed in 1840. The imposing Barchessa remains of the original complex, with the entrance gates and part of the surrounding wall. The building consists of nine arches with a volute keystone and framed by Doric pilasters supporting a molded entablature, which extends over the entire ground floor. Above the portico rises the first floor, with a very large attic, perfectly restored, in which the most significant memories of the Loredan family are preserved.

In the 1980s, after the death of her husband Antonio Rizzardi, Countess Maria Cristina Rizzardi Loredan found herself managing the Guerrieri Rizzardi winery, based on Lake Garda, which she expanded with new vineyards and wines, also applying the concept of 'Cru' as a mark of quality restricted to a well-defined vineyard. She then became President of the Garda Oil Protection Consortium in 1984, and obtained the recognition of the extra virgin olive oil in Garda DOP. In 2010 she was awarded with the Order of Merit for Labour by the President of Italy.

== Heraldry ==
Coat of arms

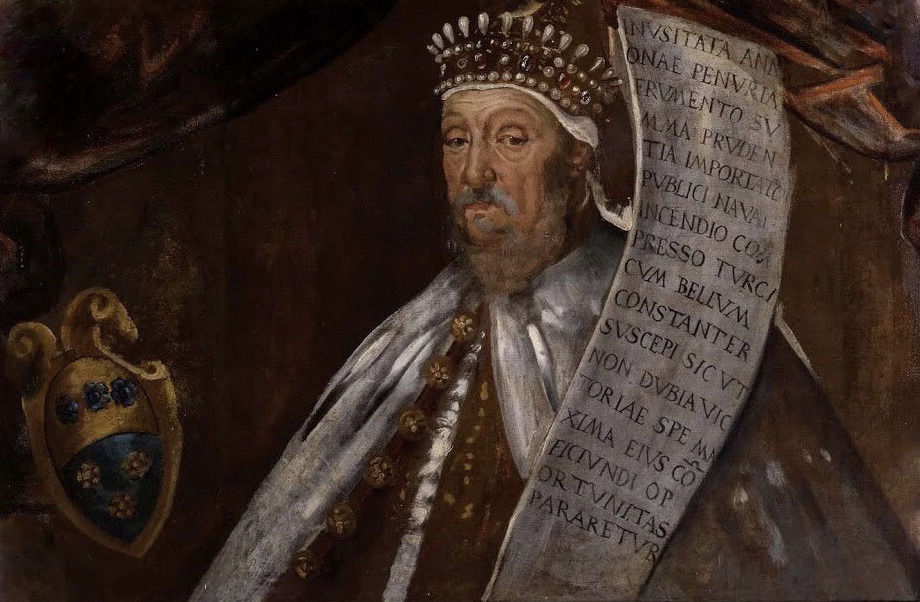
Portrait of Doge Pietro Loredan (detail), by Tintoretto, 1580s, Doge's Palace

The coat of arms of the Loredan family features a shield of yellow (top) and blue (bottom) with six laurel (or rose) flowers pictured on it; three in the yellow and three in the blue area. On top of the crest stands the corno ducale, the ceremonial crown and well-known symbol of the Doge of Venice. It is displayed on multiple buildings and palaces across the territories previously held by the Republic of Venice; from the Veneto and Friuli, Istria and Dalmatia, and in the more distant possessions such as the Ionian Islands and Crete. In Venice, it is even carved into the Rialto Bridge and the façade of St. Mark's Basilica.

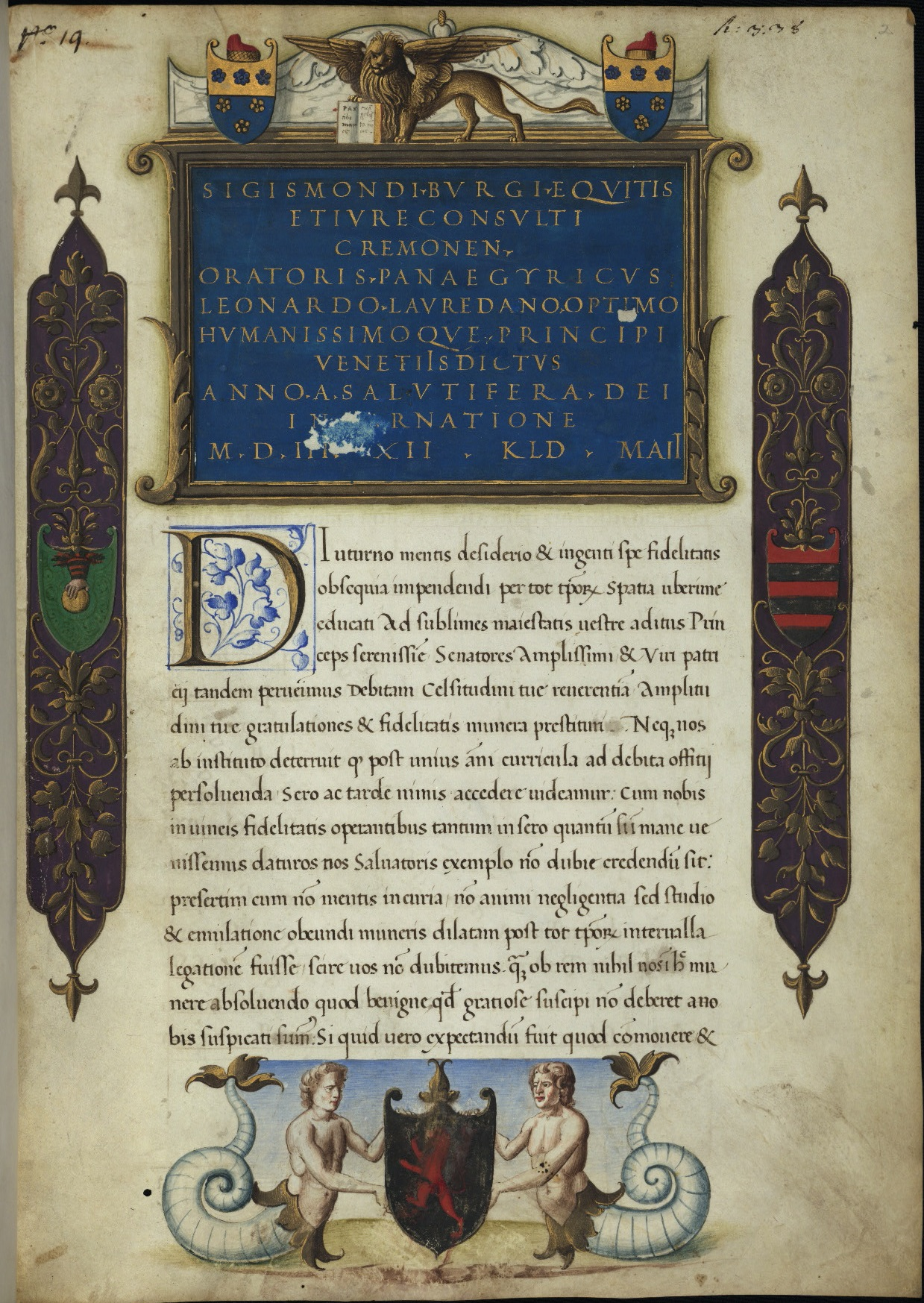
Loredan crest on the Panegyricus Leonardo Lauredano, 1503

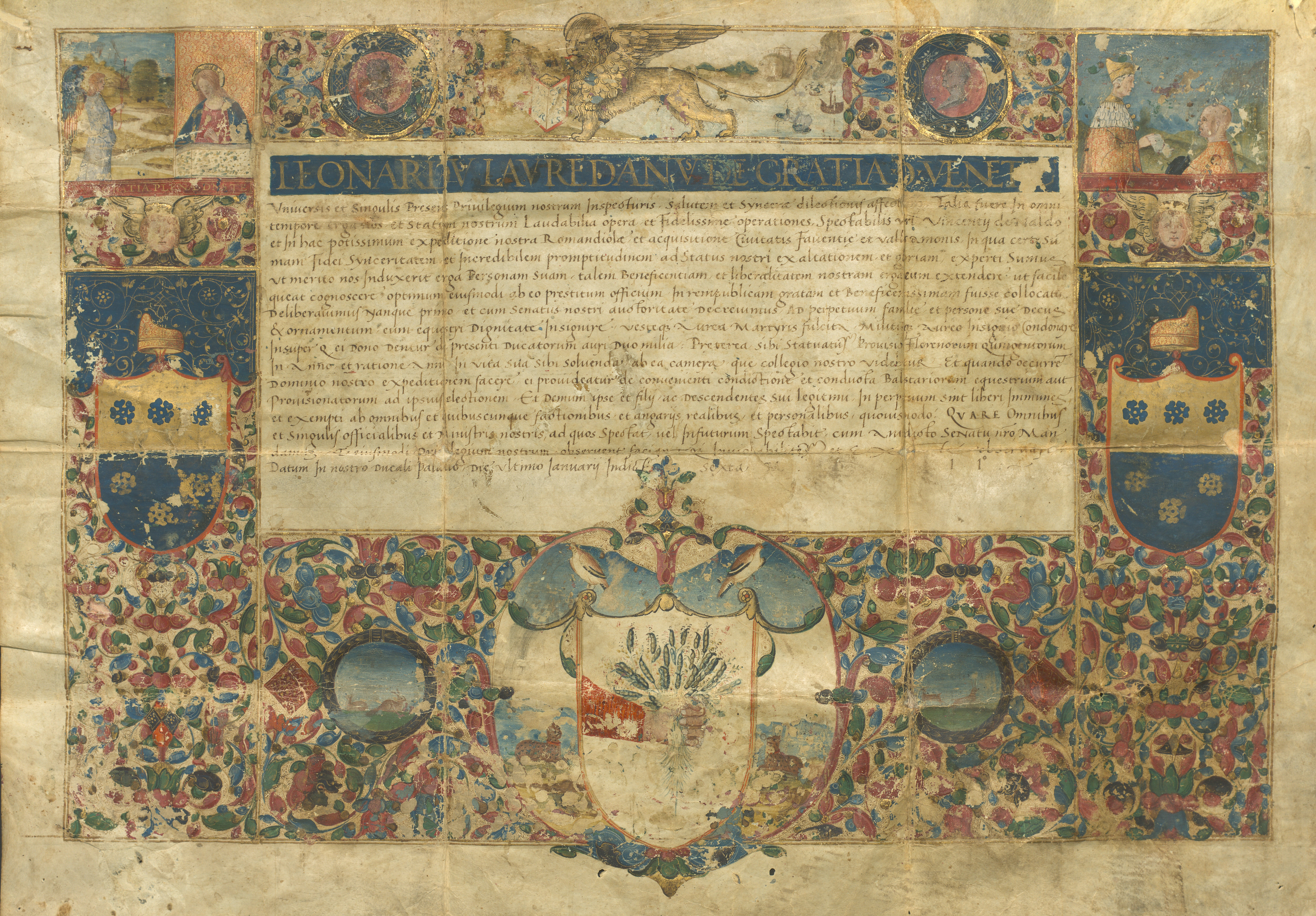
A parchment of Doge Leonardo Loredan, 1504

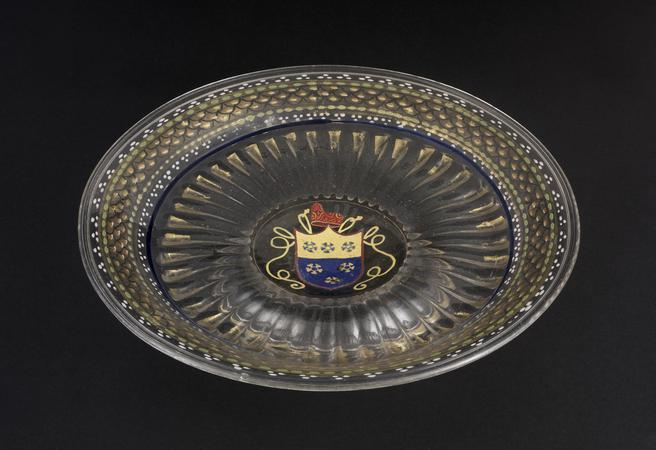
Early 16th century tazza made for Doge Leonardo Loredan, British Museum, London

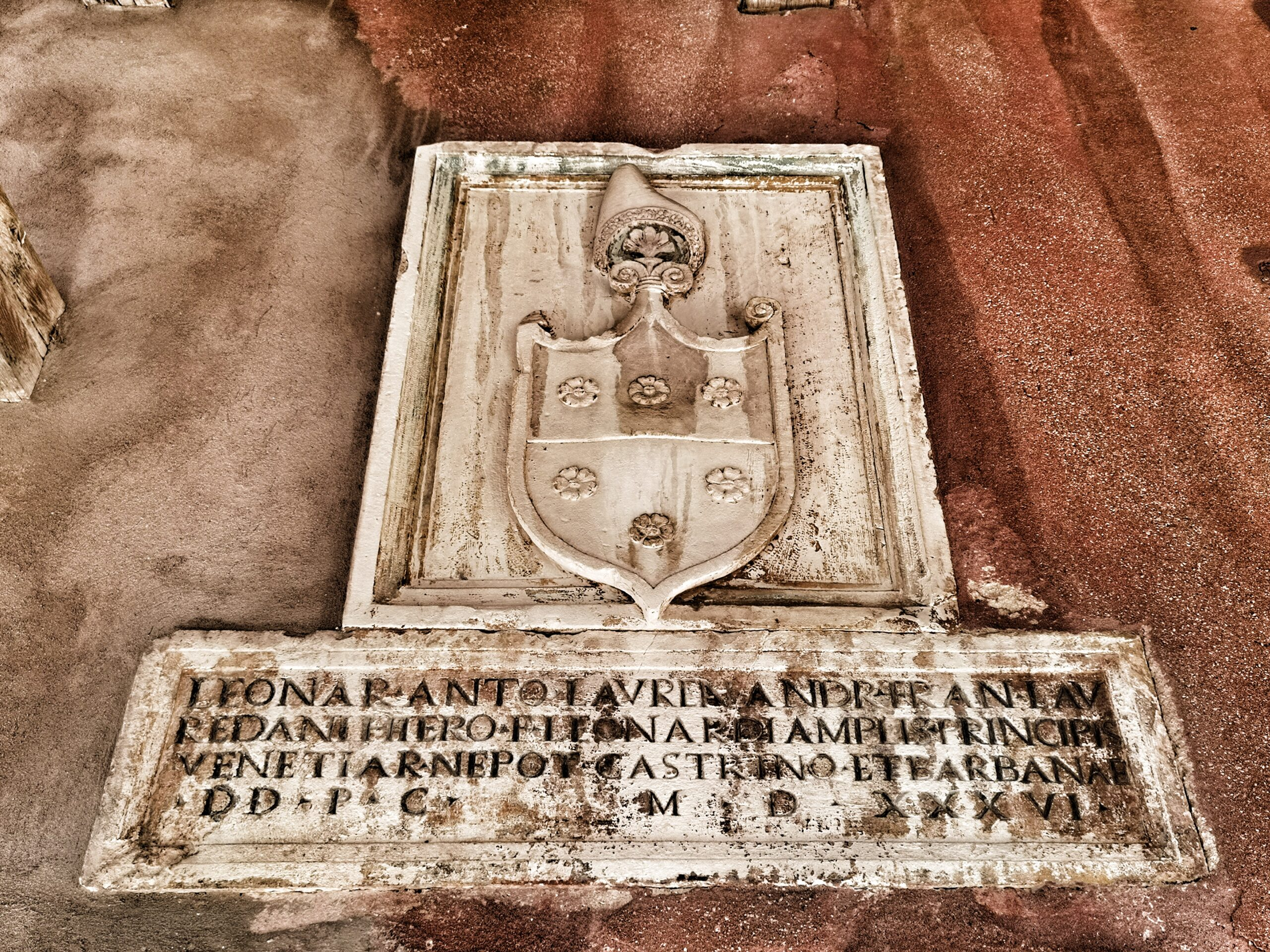
Loredan crest in Barban, Istria, Croatia

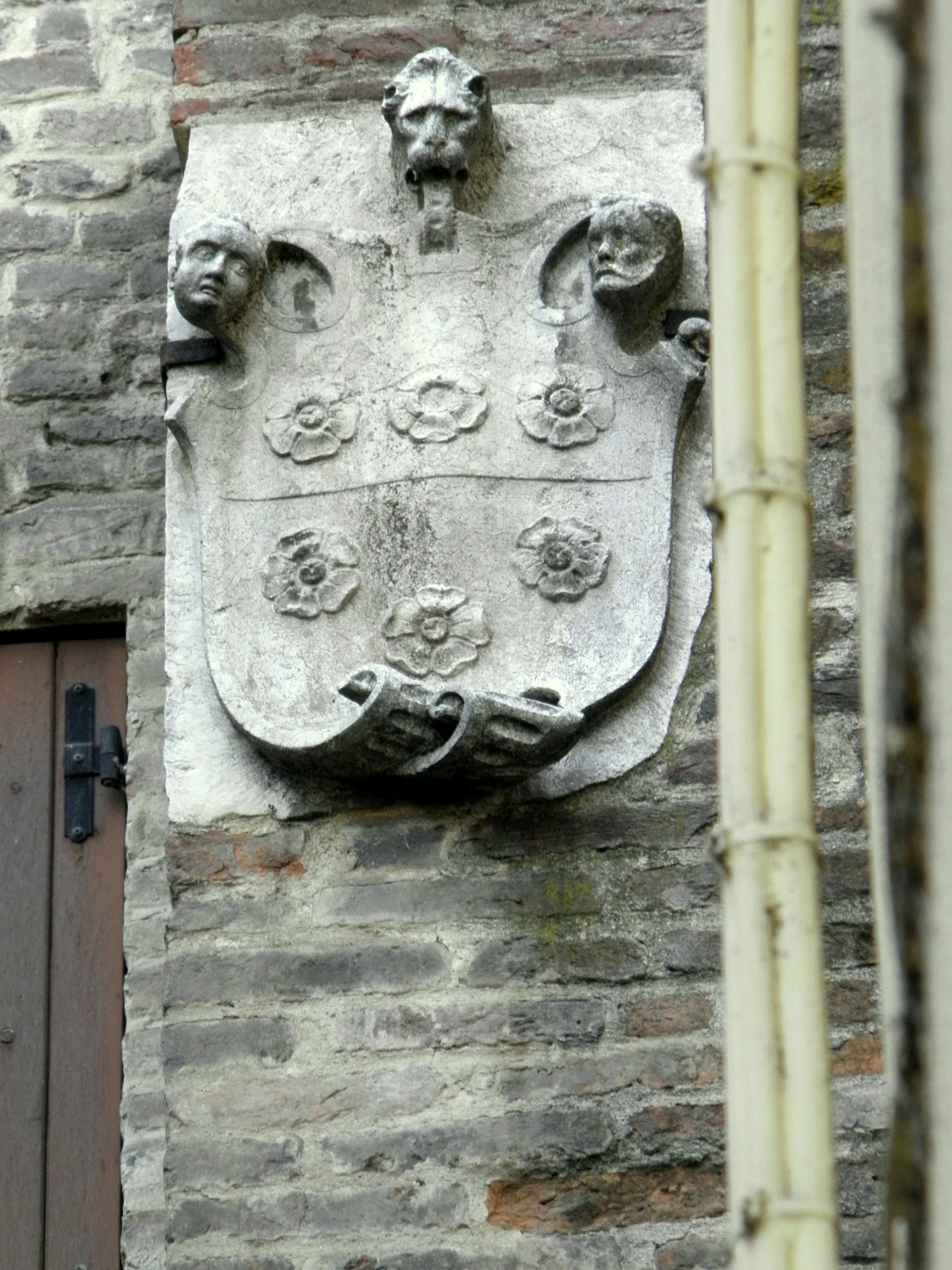
Loredan crest at Porta San Bortolo in Rovigo

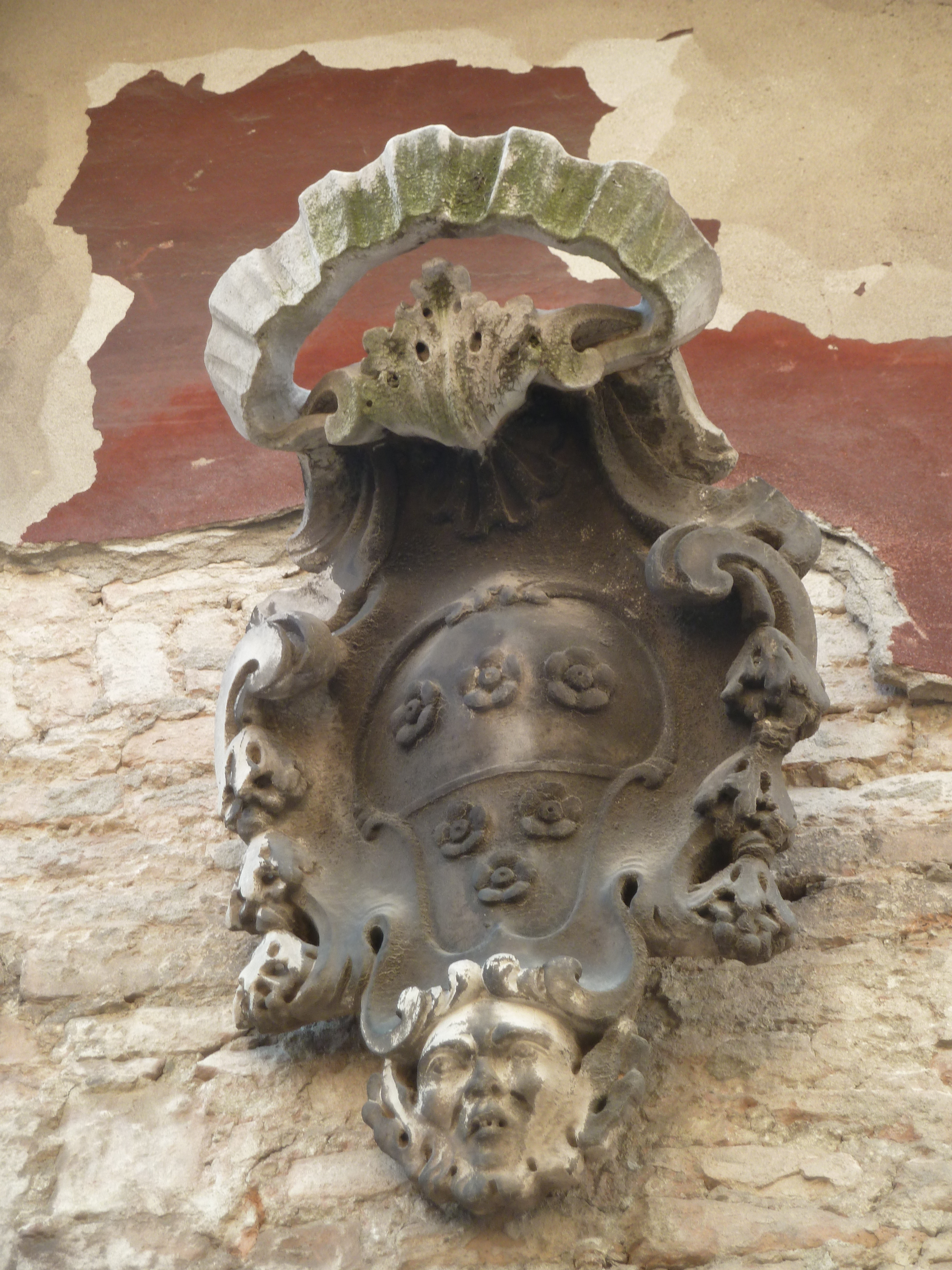
Crest on the Palazzo Loredan a San Cancian

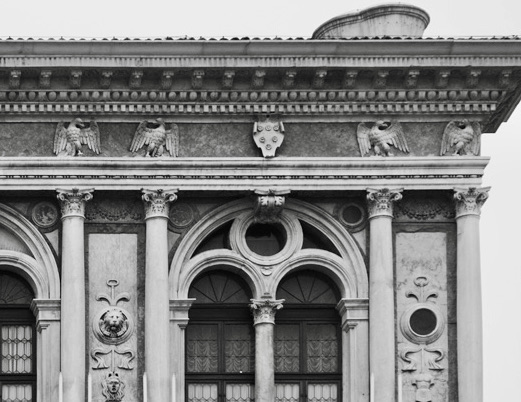
Loredan crest on the Ca' Loredan Vendramin Calergi (detail)

Motto

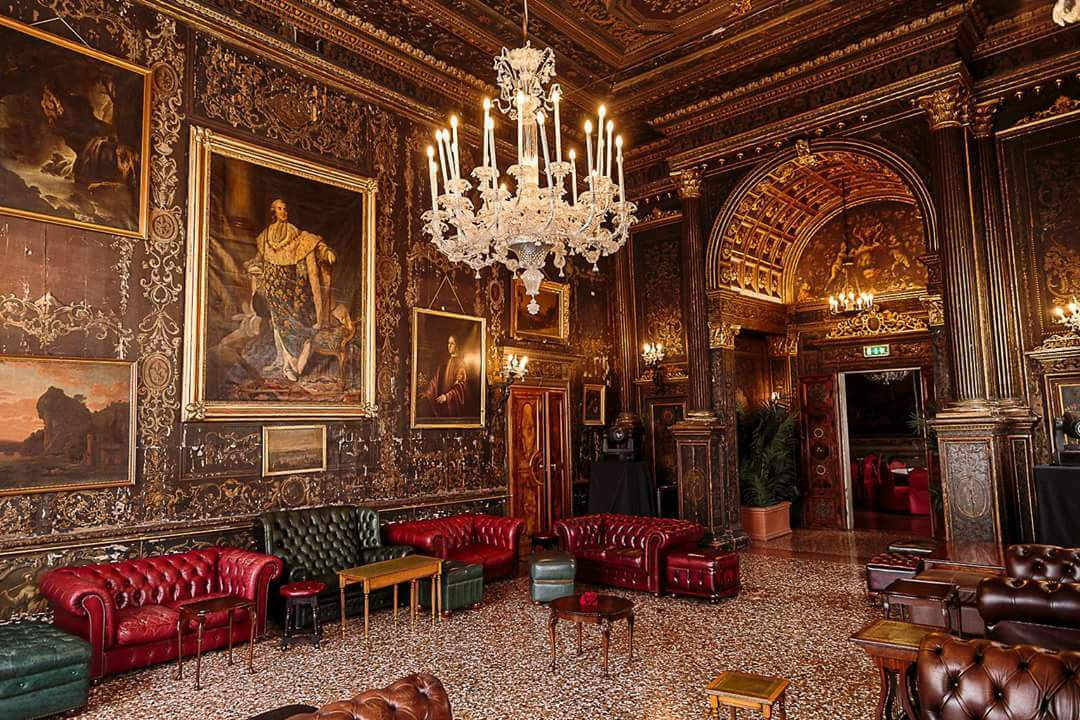
The opulent interior of the Ca' Loredan Vendramin Calergi

The beautiful façade of the Ca' Loredan Vendramin Calergi made of Istrian stone holds the Latin inscription: NON NOBIS DOMINE. The verse is derived from the Old Testament (Psalm 115:1) and was the beginning of a famous motto inscribed onto the war flag of the Knights Templar: "Nōn nōbīs, Domine, nōn nōbīs, sed nōminī tuō dā glōriam" (KJV: "Not unto us, O Lord, not unto us, but to thy name give the glory."). The verse symbolised the gratitude and humility of the Templars who, during the Crusades, fought for the glory of God and not for personal gain. It is known that Andrea Loredan, the commissioner of the palace, was close to the ideas and legacy of the Templars, so the biblical verse subsequently became the motto of the Loredan family as a whole. Due to his interest in the history of the Templars, it is even believed that his palace was one of the meeting places of the Order of Venice. Andrea, however, was not only a military general, but also a humanist protector of the arts and, in fact, he put considerable energy and capital into the palace to obtain a dwelling worthy of his value and the dignity of his family. The oak leaves around the inscription represented in Latin tradition the defender of the city, that is, one who is committed to the public good, a theme much loved by the Venetian nobility of the time. With this inscription, Andrea Loredan almost seems to want to conceal his incredible wealth, thus displaying a strong sense of humility and devotion to the Lord. The essence of the Loredan motto is, in fact, a display of piety and humility coming from a very powerful family.

== Titles ==
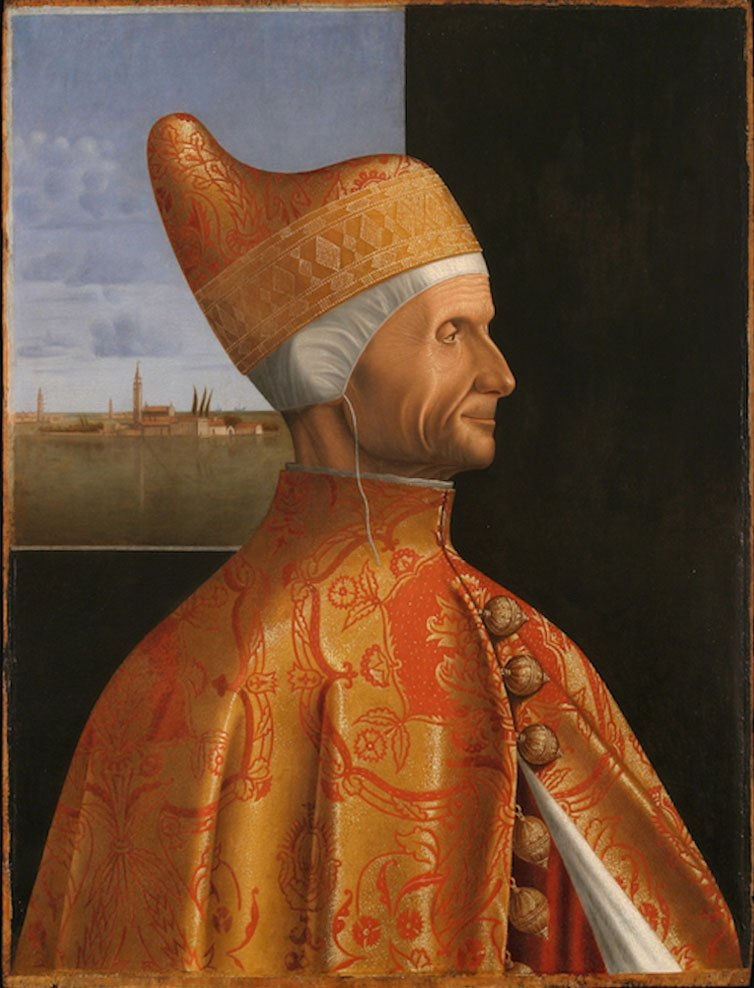
Portrait of Doge Leonardo Loredan, by Vittore Carpaccio, 1501/02, Museo Correr

Throughout history, members of the Loredan family held numerous noble and political titles, some of which include:

Title	Type	Modern country
Doge of Venice	noble and political	Italy
Dogaressa of Venice	noble and political	Italy
Procurator of St. Mark	noble and political	Italy
Duchess of the Archipelago	noble	Greece
Duke of Cyprus	noble and political	Cyprus
Duke of Candia	noble and political	Greece
Duke of the Morea	noble and political	Greece
Duke of Corfu	noble and political	Greece
Duke of Thessaloniki	noble and political	Greece
Duke of Dalmatia	noble and political	Croatia
Duke of Istria	noble and political	Croatia
Duke of Albania	noble and political	Albania
Duke of Friuli	noble and political	Italy
Count of Treviso	noble and political	Italy
Count of Rovigo	noble and political	Italy
Count of Legnago	noble and political	Italy
Count of Padua	noble and political	Italy
Count of Palmanova	noble and political	Italy
Count of Brescia	noble and political	Italy
Count of Peschiera del Garda	noble and political	Italy
Count of Bergamo	noble and political	Italy
Count of Belluno	noble and political	Italy
Count of Crema	noble and political	Italy
Count of Cremona	noble and political	Italy
Count of Feltre	noble and political	Italy
Count of Grado	noble and political	Italy
Count of Salò	noble and political	Italy
Count of Zara	noble and political	Croatia
Count of Sebenico	noble and political	Croatia
Count of Spalato	noble and political	Croatia
Count of Traù	noble and political	Croatia
Count of Nin	noble and political	Croatia
Count of Knin	noble and political	Croatia
Count of Rab	noble and political	Croatia
Count of Brač	noble and political	Croatia
Count of Curzola	noble and political	Croatia
Count of Hvar	noble and political	Croatia
Count of Vis	noble and political	Croatia
Count of Pag	noble and political	Croatia
Count of Pula	noble and political	Croatia
Count of Capo d'Istria	noble and political	Slovenia
Count of Kotor	noble and political	Montenegro
Count of Ulcinj	noble and political	Montenegro
Count of Alessio	noble and political	Albania
Count of Drivasto	noble and political	Albania
Count of Durazzo	noble and political	Albania
Count of Scutari	noble and political	Albania
Count of Famagusta	noble and political	Cyprus
Count of Thessaloniki	noble and political	Greece
Lord of Antiparos	noble	Greece
Lord of Bertinoro	noble	Italy
Lord of Ormelle	noble	Italy
Lord of Barban and Rakalj	noble	Croatia
Lady of Ios	noble	Greece
Lady of Therasia	noble	Greece
Lady of Naxos	noble	Greece
Lady of Paros	noble	Greece
Lady of Antiparos	noble	Greece
Bailo of Corfu	diplomatic	Greece
Bailo of Negroponte	diplomatic	Greece
Captain General of the Sea	naval	Greece
Captain of the Gulf	naval	Montenegro
Archbishop of Zara	ecclesiastical	Croatia
Bishop of Korčula	ecclesiastical	Croatia
Bishop of Nona	ecclesiastical	Croatia
Bishop of Novigrad	ecclesiastical	Croatia
Bishop of Pola	ecclesiastical	Croatia
Bishop of Capo d'Istria	ecclesiastical	Slovenia
Bishop of Castello	ecclesiastical	Italy
Abbot of Vangadizza	ecclesiastical	Italy

== Members ==
Doges of Venice

The family contributed three Doges: Leonardo Loredan (1501–1521), Pietro Loredan (1567–1570), and Francesco Loredan (1752–1762), of whom only the first truly set his mark on the history of Venice; the Portrait of Doge Leonardo Loredan by Giovanni Bellini makes his face familiar still.

Portrait	Name	Birth	Reign	Death	Burial	Branch	Parents	Spouse
	Leonardo Loredan	16 Nov 1436	1501–1521	22 Jun 1521	Tomb of Doge Leonardo Loredan, Basilica of Santi Giovanni e Paolo	Santo Stefano	Gerolamo Loredan Donata Donà	Morosina Giustiniani
	Pietro Loredan	1481	1567–1570	3 May 1570	Church of Saint Job	San Pantalon	Alvise Loredan Isabella Barozzi	Maria Pasqualigo, Lucrezia Capello
	Francesco Loredan	9 Feb 1685	1752–1762	19 May 1762	Tomb of Doge Leonardo Loredan, Basilica of Santi Giovanni e Paolo	Santo Stefano	Andrea Loredan Caterina Grimani	none

Other members

- Marco Loredan (11th c.). oldest known ancestor of the family
- Giovanni Loredan (d. 1411), Bishop of Capo d’Istria
- Pietro Loredan (1372 – 1438), Captain General of the Sea, Governor-General of Dalmatia
- Giovanni Loredan, Lord of Antiparos
- Alvise Loredan (1393 – 1466), Captain General of the Sea, Procurator of St. Mark
- Giacomo Loredan (1396 – 1471), Captain General of the Sea, head of the Council of Ten
- Giorgio Loredan (d. 1475), Procurator of St. Mark, head of the Council of Ten
- Antonio Loredan (1420 – 1482), military commander, governor, Procurator of St. Mark
- Antonio Loredan (1446 – 1514), ambassador to France, the Papal States, and the Holy Roman Empire
- Andrea Loredan (1450 – 1513), art collector, politician, head of the Council of Ten
- Andrea Loredan (1455 – 1499), Duke of Corfu
- Caterina Loredan, Dogaressa of Venice (1521 – 1523)
- Marco Loredan (1489 – 1557), governor and politician
- Marco Loredan (d. 1577), Archbishop of Zadar, Bishop of Nin
- Fosco Loredan (d. 1598), known for the Ghost of Fosco Loredan
- Paolina Loredan (d. 1660), Dogaressa of Venice (1655 – 1656)
- Giovanni Francesco Loredan (1607 – 1661), writer and politician, founder of the Accademia degli Incogniti
- Francesco Loredan (1656 – 1715), Procurator of St. Mark, ambassador to the Holy Roman Empire
- Teodoro Loredan Balbi (1745 – 1831), Bishop of Novigrad

Gallery

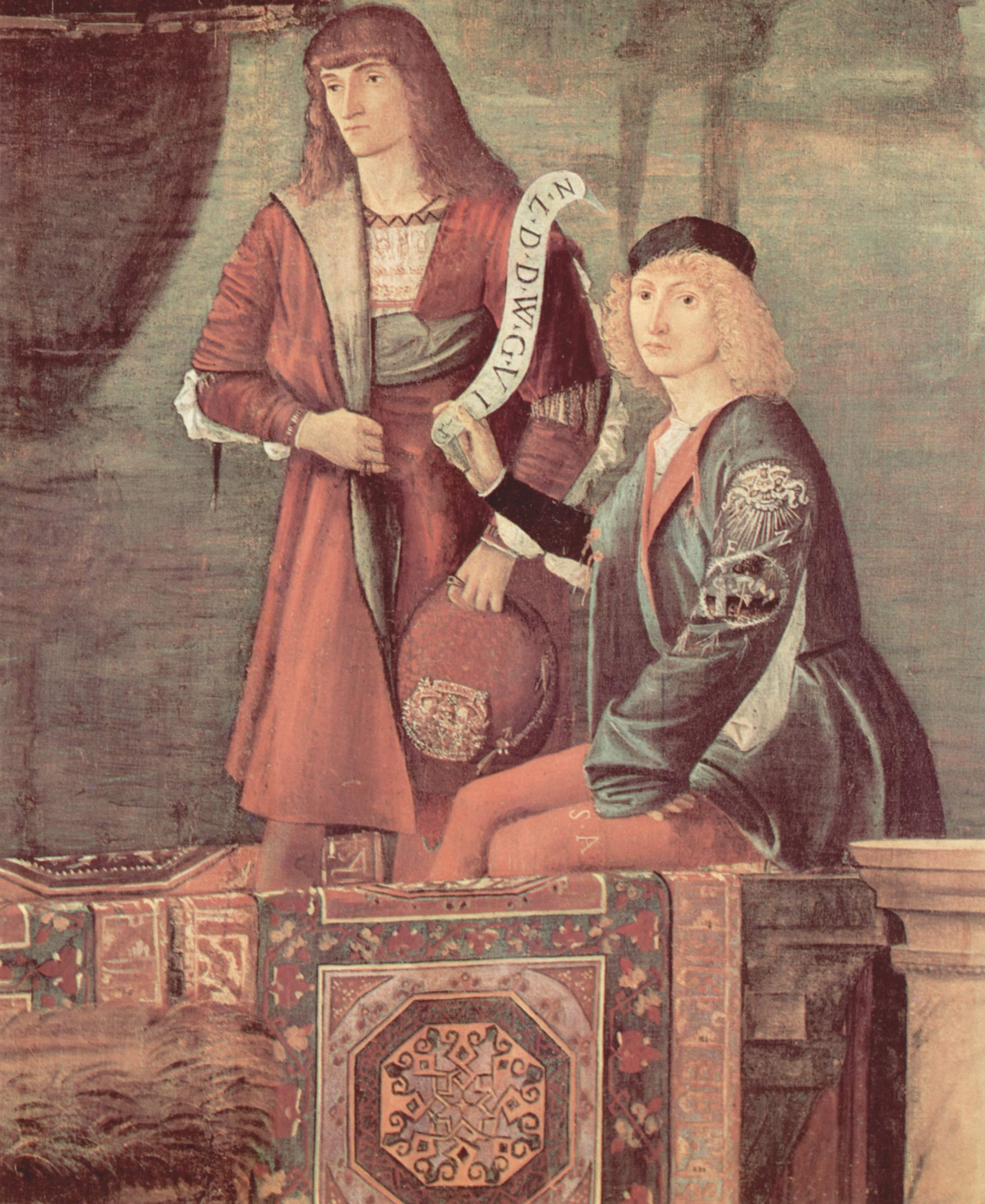
Antonio Loredan (seated) and a Young Man, by Vittore Carpaccio, 1495, Gallerie dell'Accademia

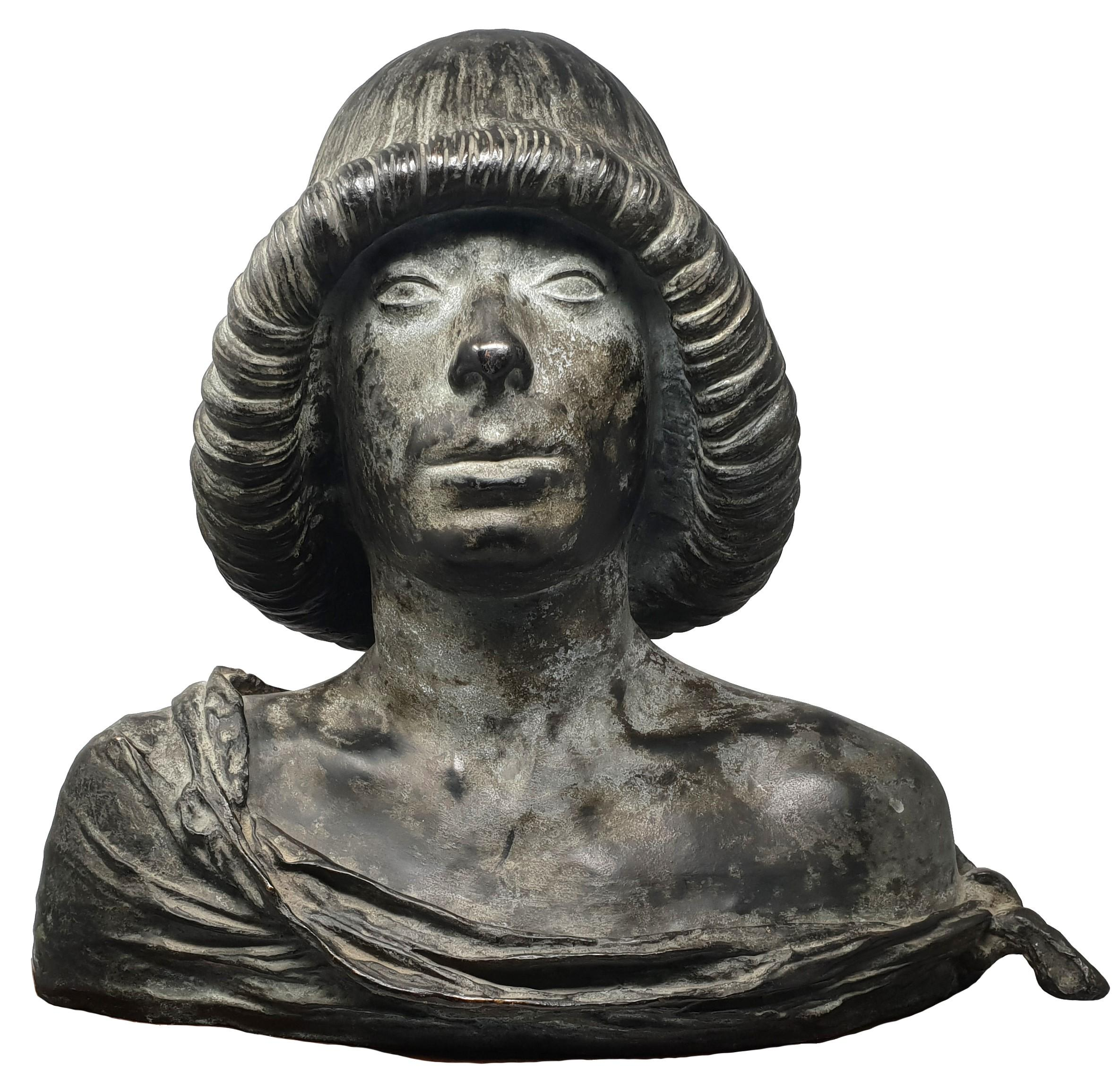
Bust of Andrea Loredan, by Antonio Rizzo, Museo Correr

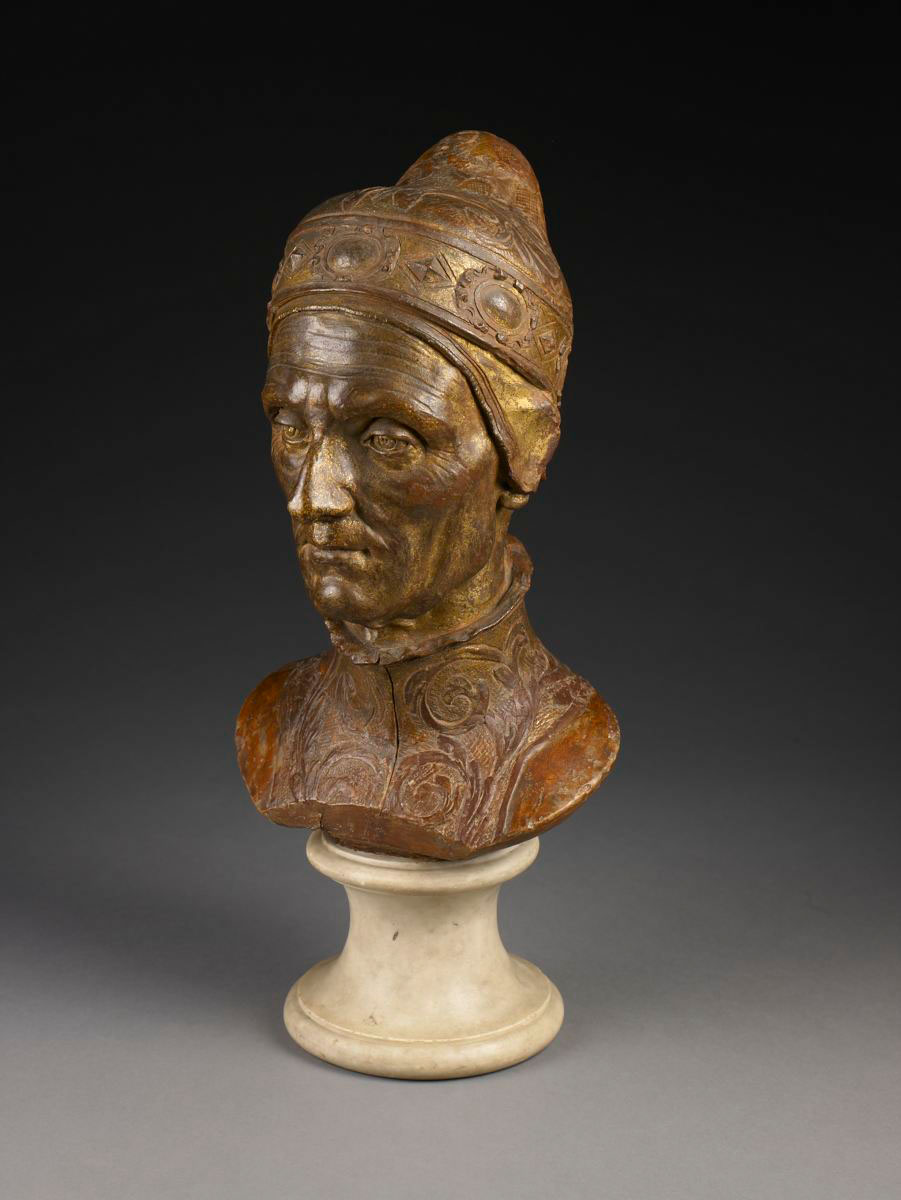
Bust of Doge Leonardo Loredan, by Danese Cattaneo, Birmingham Museum of Art, Birmingham

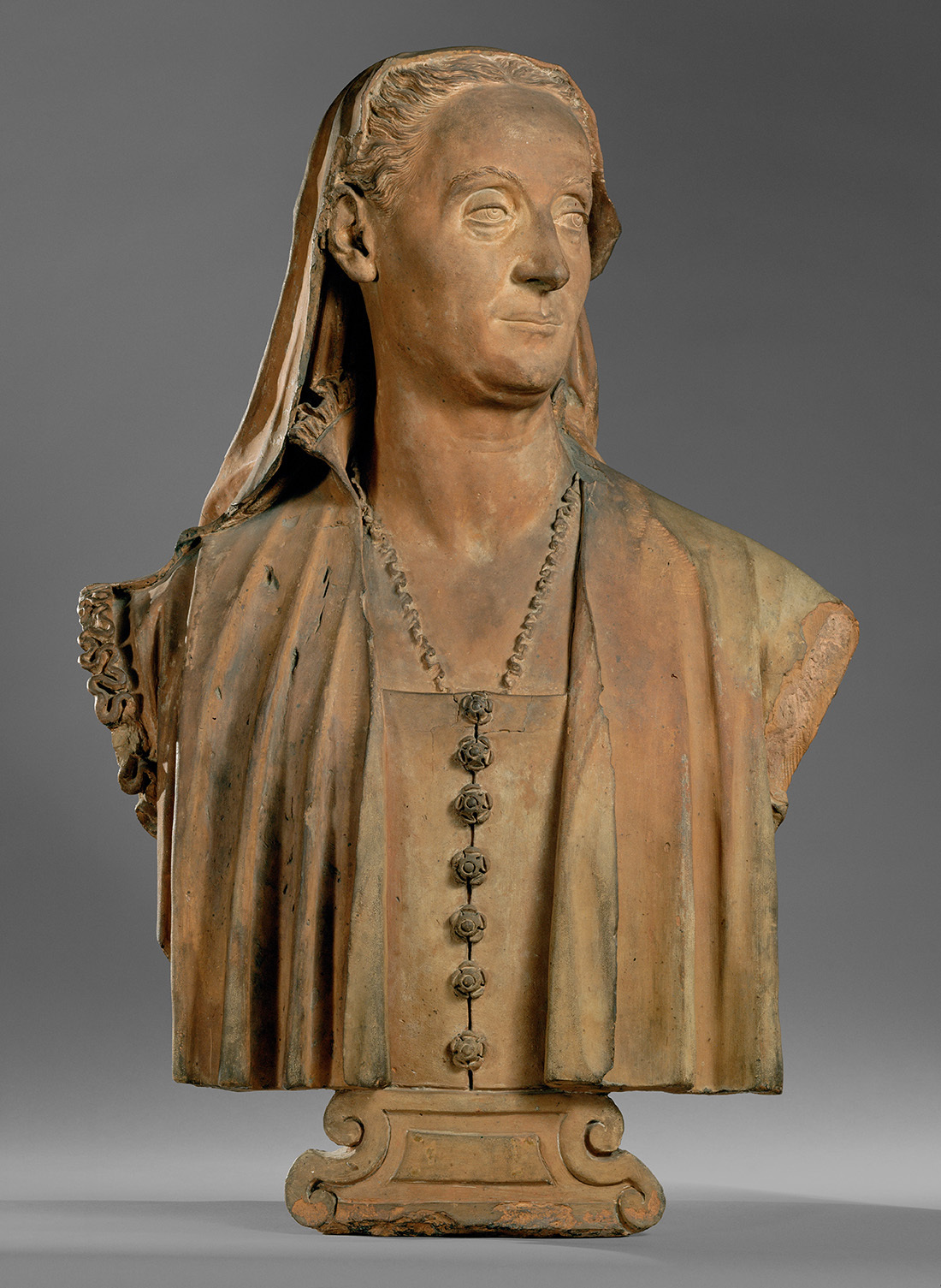
Sculpture of Angela Loredan Zorzi, by Alessandro Vittoria, 1560, Kunsthistorisches Museum, Vienna

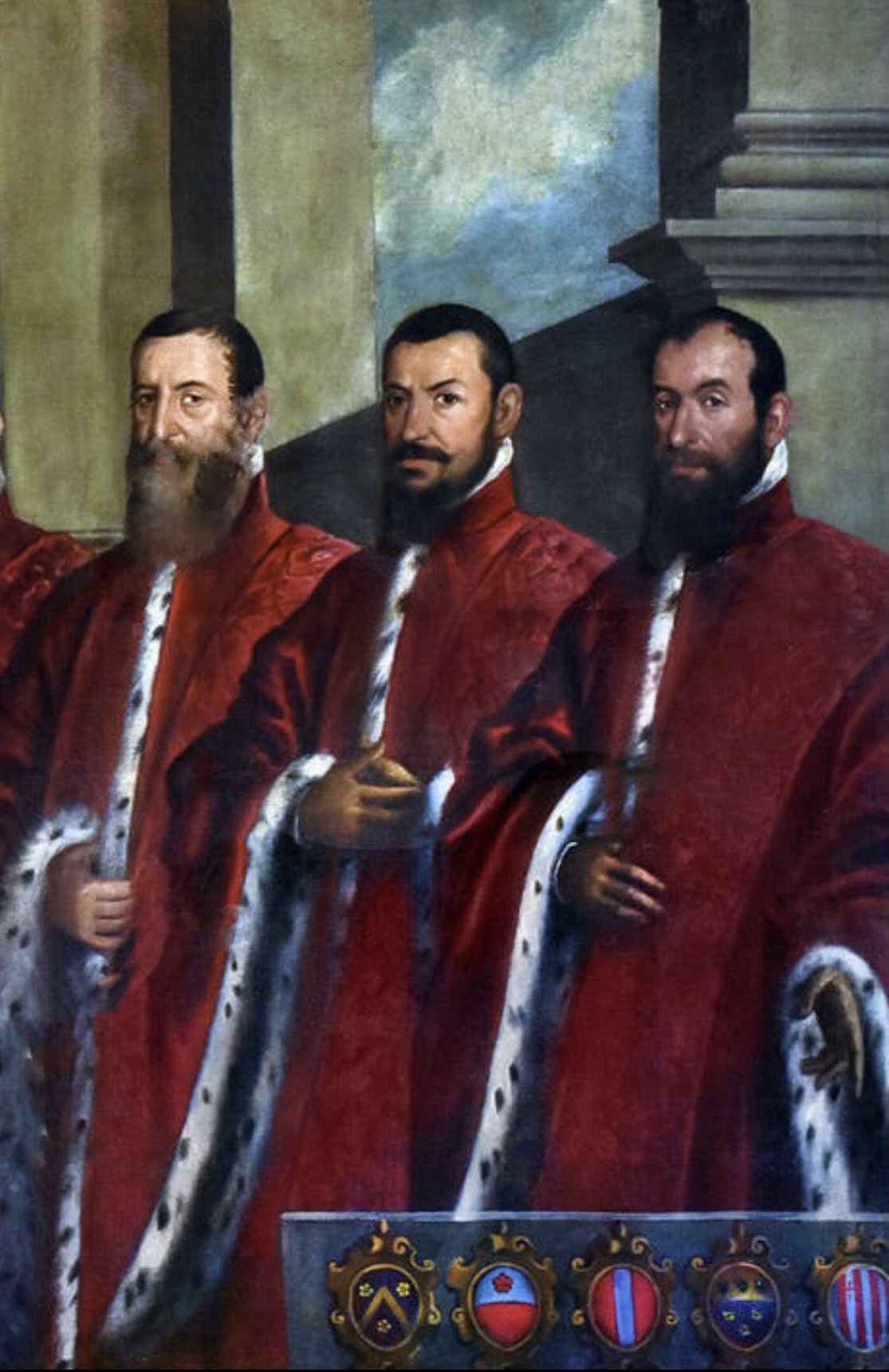
A Loredan senator (middle), Christ the Redeemer and Portraits of Ten Censors (detail), by Domenico Tintoretto, 1626, Doge's Palace

== Genealogy ==
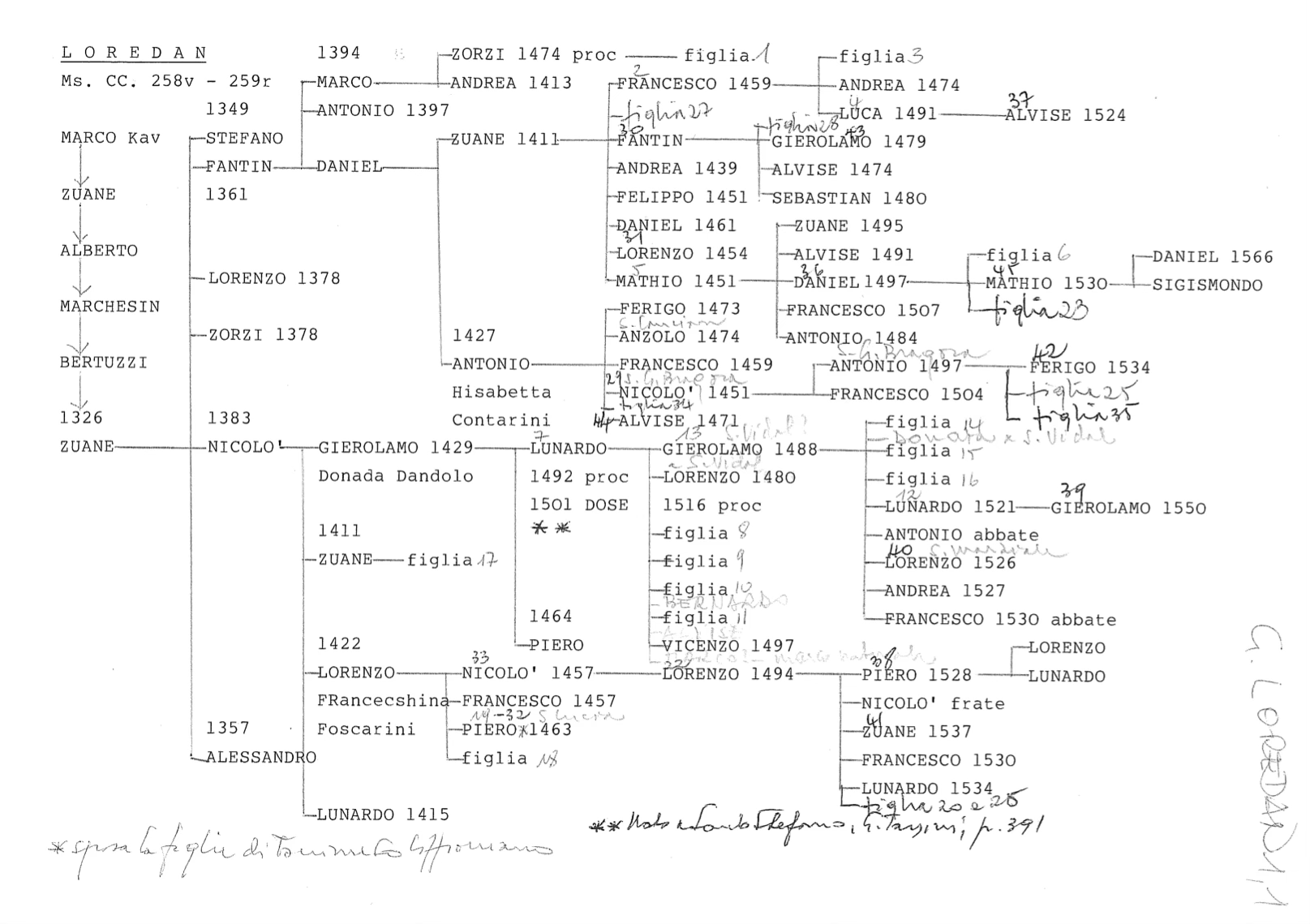
Partial genealogical tree of a branch of the Loredan family, 13th to 16th century.

It is worth noting that all of the cadet branches most likely share a common ancestor, presumably Marco Loredan, as he was ascribed to the Great Council of the Republic in 1080, according to the 16th-century philosopher Jacopo Zabarella.

Note: The genealogical trees were constructed mainly from information provided in the Dizionario Biografico degli Italiani.

Note: The only comprehensive genealogical tree is that of the branch of Santo Stefano; genealogical trees of other branches are partial and do not feature recent members.

Santo Stefano

House of Loredan-Santo Stefano

Fantino Loredan
Daniele Loredan
Elisabetta Bertucci	Antonio Loredan	Giovanni Loredan	Santuzza Garzoni
Nicolò Loredan	Andrea Loredan	Fantino Loredan (1421–1485)	Chiara Polani	Francesco Loredan	Alvisa Sant'Ippolito	Mattio Loredan (d. 1501)	Maddalena Cappelo	Lorenzo Loredan	Daniele Loredan	Loredana Loredan Contarini	Nicolò Loredan	N. Barbarigo
Girolamo Loredan	Andrea Loredan (1455–1499)	Luca Loredan	Antonio Loredan	Giacomo Loredan	Antonio Loredan (1464–1519)	Francesco III Crispo (1483–1511)	Taddea Caterina Loredan (d. 1510)	Giovanni Loredan (d. 1500)	Daniele Loredan	Francesco Loredan (d. 1532)	Alvise Loredan	Gerolamo Loredan (d. 1474)	Donata Donà
Antonio Grimani (1434–1523)	Caterina Loredan	Leonardo Loredan (1436–1521)	Morosina Giustiniani (d. 1500)	Pietro Loredan (1466–1510)
Domenico Grimani (1461–1523)	Lorenzo Loredan (1462–1534)	Girolamo Loredan (1468–1532)	Alvise Loredan (1472–1521)	Bernardo Loredan (1481–1519)	Vincenzo Loredan (d. 1499)	Donata Loredan	Maria Loredan	Giovanni Venier	Paola Loredan	Elisabetta Loredan
Carlo Contarini (1580–1656)	Paolina Loredan	Francesco Venier (1489–1556)
Francesco Loredan	Francesca Barbarigo
Leonardo Loredan (d. 1675)	Alba Soranzo
Francesco Loredan (1656–1715)	Giovanni Loredan (1662–1725)	Andrea Loredan (1664–1704)	Caterina Grimani	Francesca Loredan	Elisabetta Loredan	Maria Loredan	Maddalena Loredan	Paolina Loredan
Francesco Loredan (1685–1762)	Girolamo Loredan	Caterina Cornaro	Giovanni Loredan (d. 1767)	Anna Maria Vendramin	Francesco Loredan	Antonio Loredan	Antonio Loredan	Leonardo Loredan	Leonardo Loredan	Girolamo Loredan	Contarina Loredan	Giovanni Tommaso Mocenigo	Alba Loredan
Andrea Loredan (d. 1750)	Caterina Loredan

Note: The branch of Santo Stefano is also known as the branch of San Vidal (San Vitale).

Note: There are some generations missing between Girolamo Loredan (1468–1532) and Francesco Loredan (17th century).

Note: Morosina Giustiniani (d. 1500), the wife of Doge Leonardo Loredan (1436–1521), is also known as Giustina Giustiniani.

Note: Caterina Loredan, Dogaressa of Venice, is featured in the family tree as the daughter of Gerolamo Loredan (d. 1474) and Donata Donà because, in some sources, she is mentioned as the sister of Doge Leonardo Loredan (1436–1521), although she may have been a daughter of Domenico Loredan.

Interestingly, near the Palazzo Contarini-Sceriman and the nearby bridge, Leonardo Loredan (d. 1675) was found dead in a boat. The unexplained death was the source of many rumors, claiming accidental death, murder by relatives, or murder by the Inquisitors of the Republic.

Andrea Loredan (d. 1750) died young, thus ending the male (agnatic) line of the branch of Santo Stefano.

San Pantaleone della Frescada

House of Loredan-San Pantaleone della Frescada

Francesco Loredan
Polo Loredan
Alvise Loredan	Isabella Barozzi
Pietro Loredan (1482–1570)	Maria Lucrezia Capello
Alvise Loredan (1521–1593)	Elena Emo	Paola Loredan Pisani
Marco Loredan (1567–1641)	Elisabetta Loredan Foscari

Note: Alvise Loredan and Elena Emo had many children, but only Elisabetta Loredan Foscari is featured in the family tree.

Pietro Loredan (1482–1570) reigned as the 84th Doge of Venice from 1567 until his death in 1570.

San Cancian

House of Loredan-San Cancian

Bartolo Loredan
Nicolo Loredan
Paolo Loredan
Alvise Loredan (d. 1414)	Giovanna (d. after 1404)	Bertucci Loredan	Fantino Loredan
Campagnola Lando	Pietro Loredan (1372–1438)	Zorzi Loredan	Giovanni Loredan (d. 1420)	Lorenzo Loredan	Marina Contarini	Marco Loredan
Polo Loredan	Giacomo Loredan (1396–1471)	Maria Loredan	Francesco Barbaro (1390–1454)	Andriola Negrobon	Alvise Loredan (1393–1466)	Isabella Cocco	Gerolamo Loredan	Antonio Loredan (1446–1514)	Franchescina Mòro di Baldissera	Alvise Loredan	Tommaso Loredan	Andriana Loredan	Giorgio Loredan (d. 1475)	Andrea Loredan
Francesco Loredan	Giovanni Loredan	Marco Loredan	Nicolò Loredan	Lorenzo Loredan
Santa Maria Nova	Santa Maria Formosa

Note: In the Venetian language, Pietro Loredan (1372–1438) was known as Piero Loredan.

Note: Besides the four sons and a daughter listed in the tree, Lorenzo Loredan and Marina Contarini had two other sons, Bortolo and Piero, but they died at childbirth.

Santa Maria Formosa

House of Loredan-Santa Maria Formosa

Alvise Loredan	Giovanna (d. after 1404)
Pietro Loredan (1372–1438)	Campagnola Lando	Giorgio Loredan	Giovanni Loredan (d. 1420)
Polo Loredan	Giacomo Loredan (1396–1471)	Beatrice Marcello	Maria Loredan	Francesco Barbaro (1390–1454)
Antonio Loredan (1420–1482)	Orsola Pisani	Luca Loredan
San Cancian
Giovanni Loredan (d. 1540)	Jacopo Loredan	Marco Loredan (d. 1536)	Margherita Marzano
Santa Maria Nova
Gianfrancesco Loredan
Lorenzo Loredan (d. 1608)	Leonora Boldù (d. 1609)	Maria Loredan
Giovanni Francesco Loredan (1607–1661)	Laura Valier
Antonio Loredan (b. 1641)	Antonio Alberto Loredan (b. 1644)	Ottavio Loredan (b. 1648)	Lorenzo Loredan (b. 1649)	Elena Loredan
Lorenzo Loredan "Lolo"

Note: Giacomo Loredan (1396–1471) and Beatrice Marcello had several children, although only Antonio Loredan and Luca Loredan are featured in this genealogical tree.

Note: Antonio Loredan (1420–1482) and Orsola Pisani had many children, although only three sons (Giovanni, Marco, Jacopo) are featured in this genealogical tree.

Santa Maria Nova

House of Loredan-Santa Maria Nova

Alvise Loredan	Giovanna (d. after 1404)
Pietro Loredan (1372–1438)	Campagnola Lando	Giorgio Loredan	Giovanni Loredan (d. 1420)
Beatrice Marcello	Giacomo Loredan (1396–1471)	Polo Loredan	Maria Loredan	Francesco Barbaro (1390–1454)
San Cancian
Alvise Loredan (d. 1502)	Argentina Vincenzina Contarini
Santa Maria Formosa
Alessandro Loredan	Lorenzo Loredan	Marco Loredan (1489–1557)	Elisabetta Contarini
Alvise Loredan (1533–1560)	Nicolò Loredan (1534–1560)	Giovanni Loredan (1537–1571)	Polo Loredan (1540–1593)	Pietro Loredan (1541–1565)

Note: Alvise Loredan (d. 1502) and Argentina Vincenzina Contarini had 10 children—4 sons and 6 daughters, although only Alessandro, Lorenzo and Marco Loredan (1489–1557) are featured in the genealogical tree.

Note: Besides the five sons listed, Marco Loredan (1489–1557) and Elisabetta Contarini also had daughters.

Alvise Loredan (d. 1502) was a military general.

Alvise Loredan (1533–1560) was assassinated in 1560.

Giovanni Loredan (1537–1571) was killed in the Echinades, Ionian Sea, as a commander of a galley in the Battle of Lepanto.

Polo Loredan (1540–1493) was the one to continue the lineage.

Ducal line in Greece

House of Loredan-Greece

Giovanni Loredan	Maria Sommaripa
Francesco Crispo	Lucrezia Loredan (1446–1528)	Paolo Paterno	Francesco III Crispo (1483–1511)	Taddea Caterina Loredan (d. 1510)	Antonio Loredan
Caterina Crispo	John IV Crispo (1499–1564)	Adriana Gozzadini
Caterina Crispo (b. 1516)	Francesco IV Crispo (1518–1550)	Taddea Crispo (b. 1519)	Giacomo IV Crispo (1520–1576)

== Wealth ==
The Loredans were among the wealthiest families of the Venetian patriciate, and are almost certainly one of the wealthiest families of all time, although the complexity of their assets and the fact that their fortunes varied considerably between branches and generations makes their capital challenging to assess. The family’s wealth was accumulated through a combination of maritime commerce, landed property, urban real estate, financial operations, marriage alliances and, increasingly from the Renaissance onward, investment in the political and economic institutions of the Venetian Republic. By the eighteenth century the family possessed an extensive portfolio of palaces, houses, shops, agricultural estates and feudal properties extending across Venice, the Venetian mainland, Friuli, Istria, Dalmatia, and the Aegean. The scale of the family's wealth is particularly well documented in the eighteenth century, when individual Loredans left unusually detailed records of their revenues, investments, debts and property.

=== Origins of the fortune ===
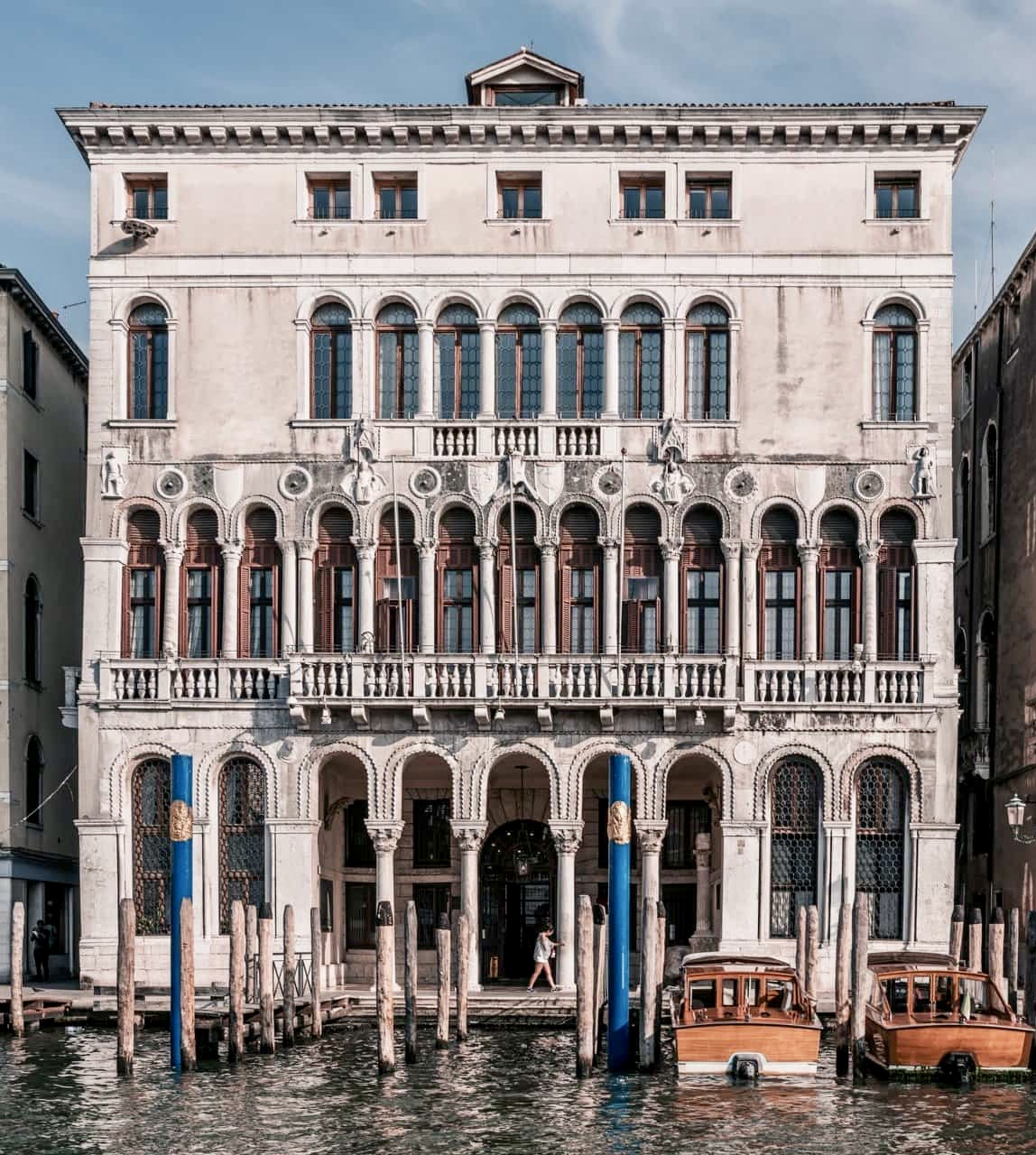
Ca' Loredan, a 13th-century palace on the Grand Canal.

The Loredans were already regarded by later Venetian historians as a wealthy family at the time of their establishment in Venice. Jacopo Zabarella, writing in the seventeenth century, described the family as wealthy at an early date, although claims that their fortune derived from an ancient Roman lineage are much less certain. Their more securely documented wealth was connected with the commercial economy of medieval Venice. Like other major Venetian patrician families, they participated in the trade in silk, spices and other luxury goods, while members of the family were also involved in commerce with the eastern Mediterranean and, by the fourteenth century, in longer-distance ventures extending to Egypt, Persia, India and China. Sources also associate some medieval Loredans with moneylending and usury, and with the slave trade that formed part of the wider Venetian commercial system.

During the fifteenth century the Loredans expanded their economic interests beyond Venice. On Tinos and Mykonos they accumulated houses, agricultural properties, mills and other economic assets, becoming deeply involved in the region's rural and commercial economy, and effectively establishing Loredan rule on those islands. The family's Aegean interests were accompanied by aristocratic and dynastic connections: Giovanni Loredan acquired Antiparos through his marriage into the Sommaripa family and subsequently financed the settlement and fortification of the island, including the construction of the Castle of Antiparos around 1440.

=== Renaissance wealth and the Loredan palaces ===
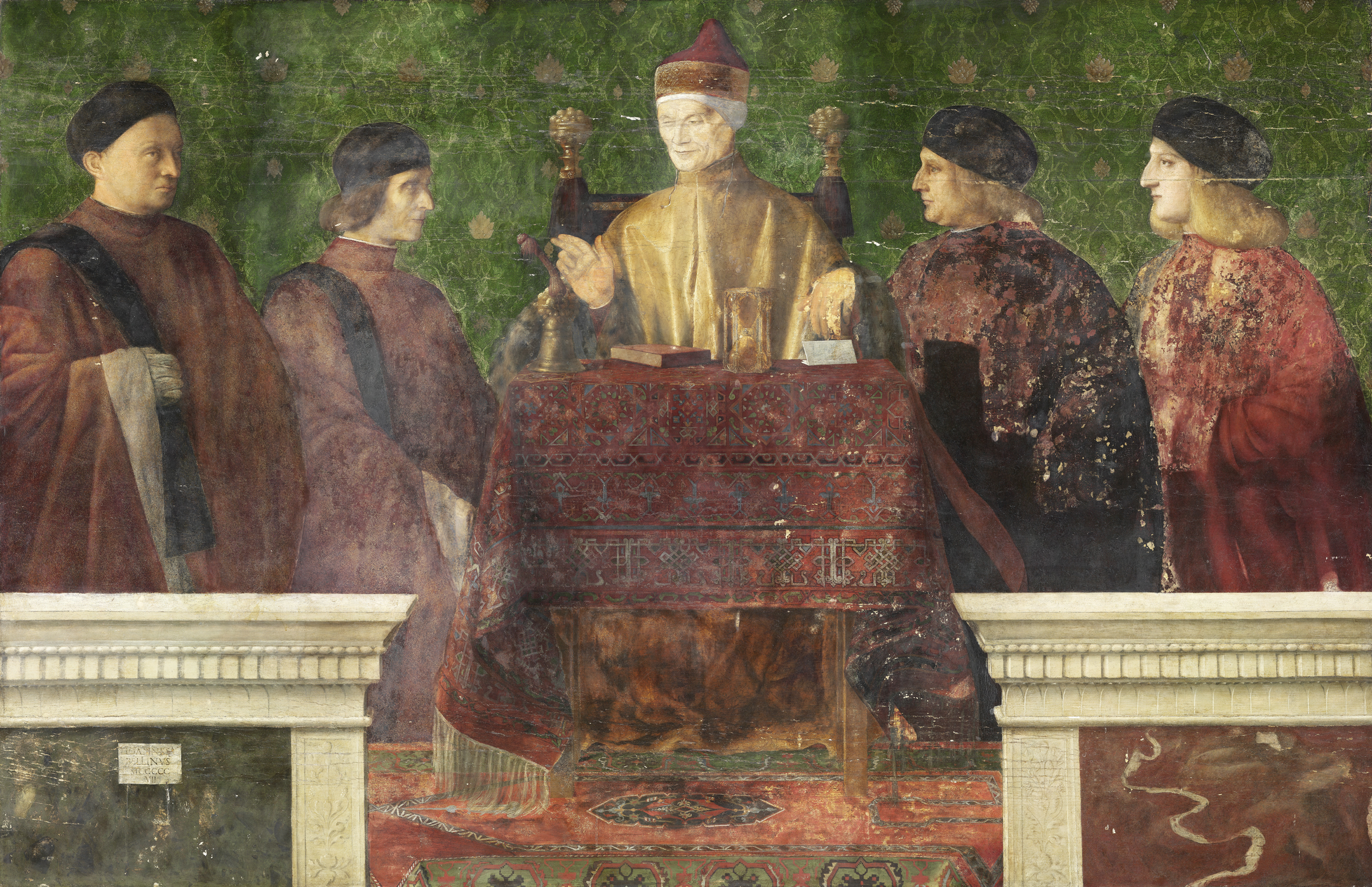
Doge Leonardo Loredan with Four Sons, by Giovanni Bellini, 1507, Gemäldegalerie, Berlin

The scale of Loredan wealth becomes especially visible in the early sixteenth century. Leonardo Loredan, who became doge in 1501, had engaged in trade in North Africa and the Levant before his election and continued to draw upon the family's commercial resources. His political career coincided with an important expansion of Loredan influence and with conspicuous investment in architecture and property.

The most striking example is the palace at San Marcuola, now known as Ca' Loredan Vendramin Calergi. Andrea Loredan commissioned the building, designed by Mauro Codussi, and it became one of the grandest Renaissance residences on the Grand Canal. Francesco Sansovino later singled it out as one of four exceptional Venetian buildings, mentioning that its Loredan patron had spent more than 200,000 ducats on the palace's construction, which equates to around 700 kilograms of pure gold. For reference, this amount of money represented something close to the budget of a princely court, a major state project, or the entire wealth of some of Europe's richest families at the time. The value of the completed Loredan palace can also be gauged from its later sale. In 1581, Andrea Loredan's heirs obtained permission to dispose of the property and sold it to Eric II, Duke of Brunswick-Lüneburg. The duke reportedly had to borrow money to complete the purchase.

The Loredans simultaneously accumulated other major residences, including the Palace of Santo Stefano, which they acquired and enlarged using the income from the Abbey of Vangadizza and its extensive lands and revenues which they controlled, as well as the Palazzo Loredan dell'Ambasciatore and the Ca' Loredan, among others.

Around this time the family also acquired landed and feudal property. In 1535 Leonardo Loredan and his brothers purchased the Istrian territories of Barban and Rakalj for 14,760 ducats. The Loredans subsequently retained the estate for more than three centuries, until the abolition of feudal rights in 1869.

=== Political power and financial wealth ===
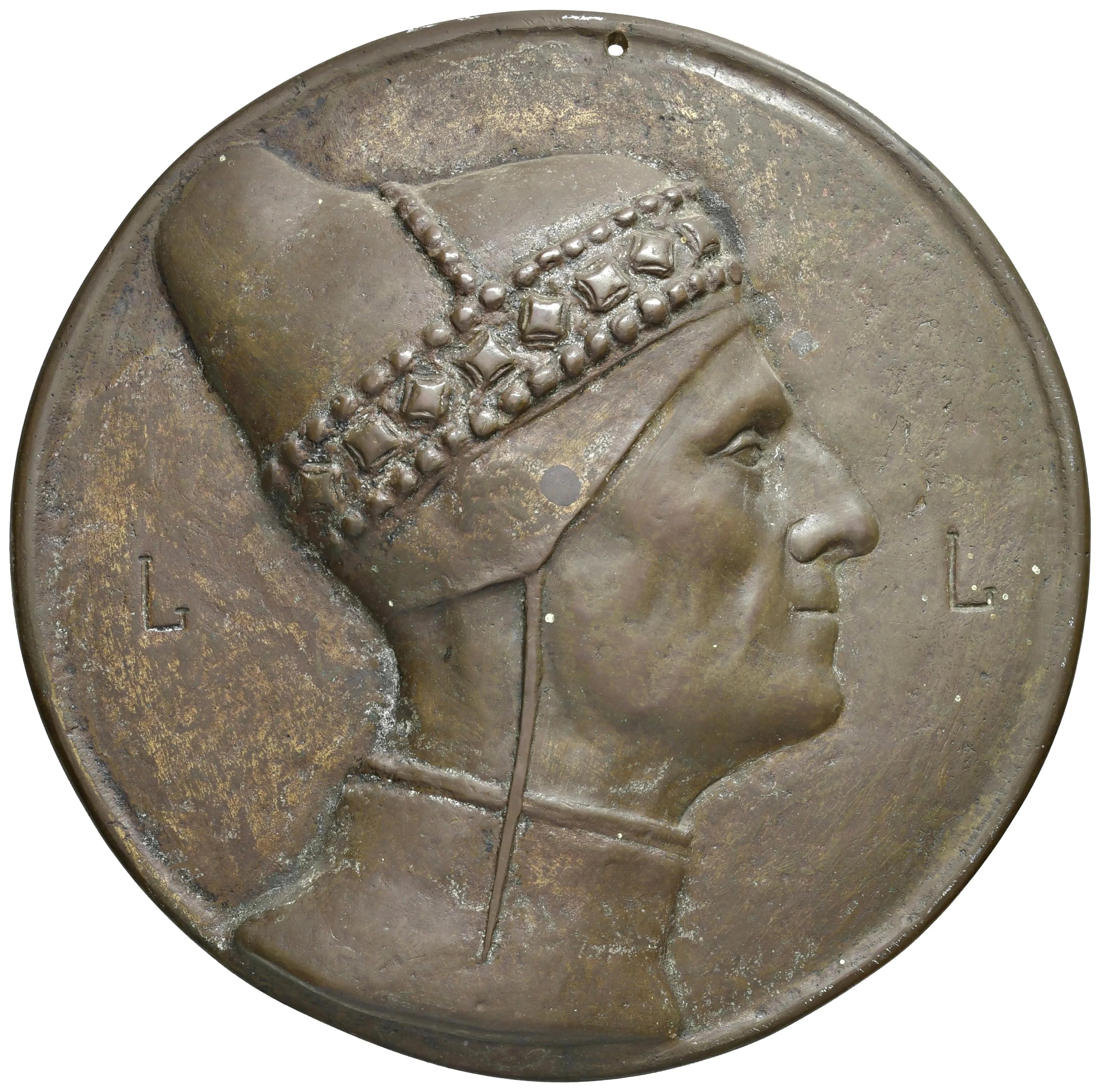
Medal of Leonardo Loredan in bronze, 16th century

Leonardo Loredan's dogeship also illustrates the close relationship between political power and private finance in Renaissance Venice. The Loredans were major creditors of powerful institutions and individuals, and the family was able to use its financial resources in conjunction with its political influence. Following the Venetian victory over the Papal States during the later stages of the War of the League of Cambrai, outstanding papal debts to the Loredan family were reportedly settled to a total of approximately 500,000 ducats. The figure is enormous by contemporary standards and is best treated as the aggregate of debts owed to the family rather than as a single cash payment or as Leonardo's personal fortune.

The Republic itself acquired the entire coastal region of Dalmatia from Hungary in the previous century for 100,000 ducats, making the reported 500,000-ducat total several times the price of that major territorial acquisition.

The family's wealth was also sufficiently substantial to survive political reverses. After Leonardo's death, his heirs were investigated over abuses associated with the final years of his dogeship and were fined a substantial sum of 9,500 ducats.

=== Landed wealth and marriage alliances ===
The Villa Barbarigo Loredan, in Noventa Vicentina, passed in the 1620s from the Barbarigo to the Loredan family, who owned it until 1755.

Over the seventeenth and eighteenth centuries the family's wealth became increasingly tied to landed property, and marriage was an important mechanism for consolidating these estates. A particularly significant alliance was the marriage in the 1620s of Francesca Barbarigo to Francesco Loredan, which brought a part of the substantial Barbarigo property into the Loredan patrimony.

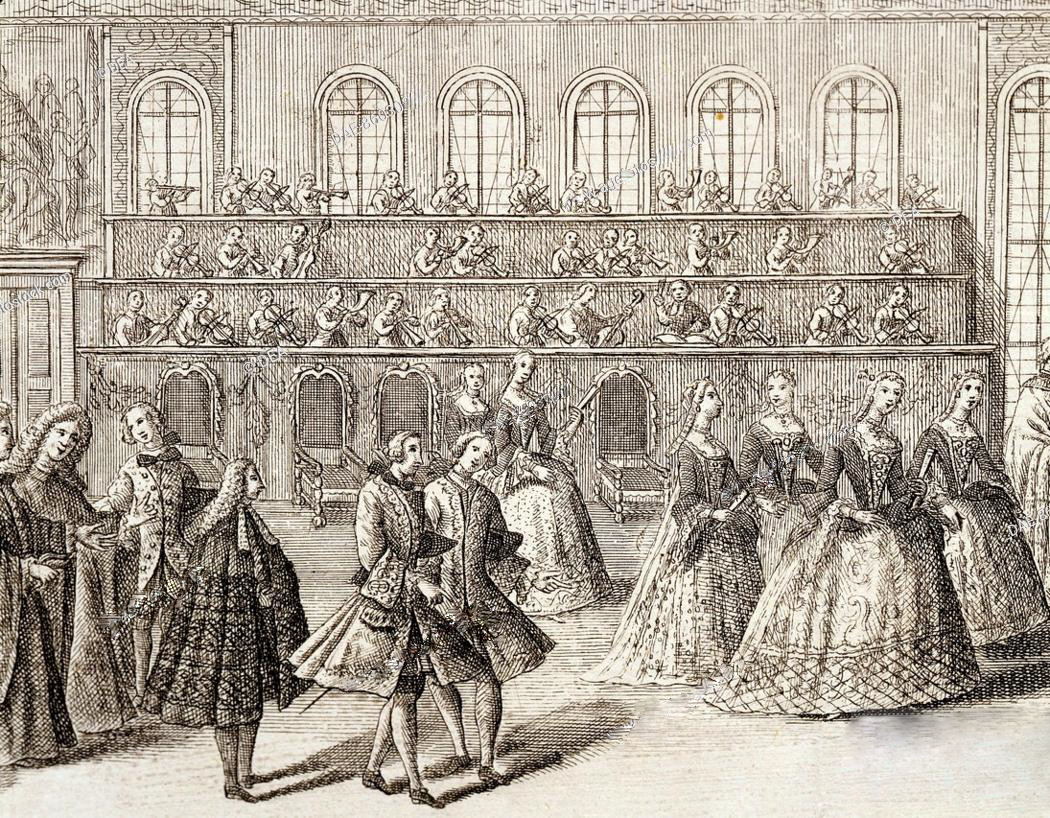
Marriage of Caterina Loredan to Giovanni Mocenigo, 1752, Museo Correr

By the eighteenth century these estates extended across a large part of the Venetian mainland. They included property around Marghera and Meolo; extensive holdings in the Polesine around Canda, Anguillara Veneta, San Martino di Venezze, Rovigo, Badia Polesine and Polesella; estates around Montagnana, Cittadella, Piove di Sacco and Altichiero; properties in Treviso and Vicenza; and further possessions in Verona, Friuli, Istria, and Dalmatia. Villas and agricultural estates at Stra (the Villa Loredan), Canda and Noventa Vicentina (the Villa Barbarigo Loredan) were among the family's more important properties.

The scale of these agricultural assets can be quantified. An estimate made in 1755 valued the annual income from the former Barbarigo lands at approximately 11,000 ducats. This was not the family's total landed income but the yield attributed to just one major component of its estates.

Urban property was equally important. The 1739 tithing census and other records show that the family possessed at least 76 houses and shops in Venice and Mazzorbo, in addition to its principal palaces and other buildings. These properties were distributed among several Venetian districts, especially San Polo, Cannaregio and Castello.

=== Francesco Loredan and the scale of eighteenth-century wealth ===
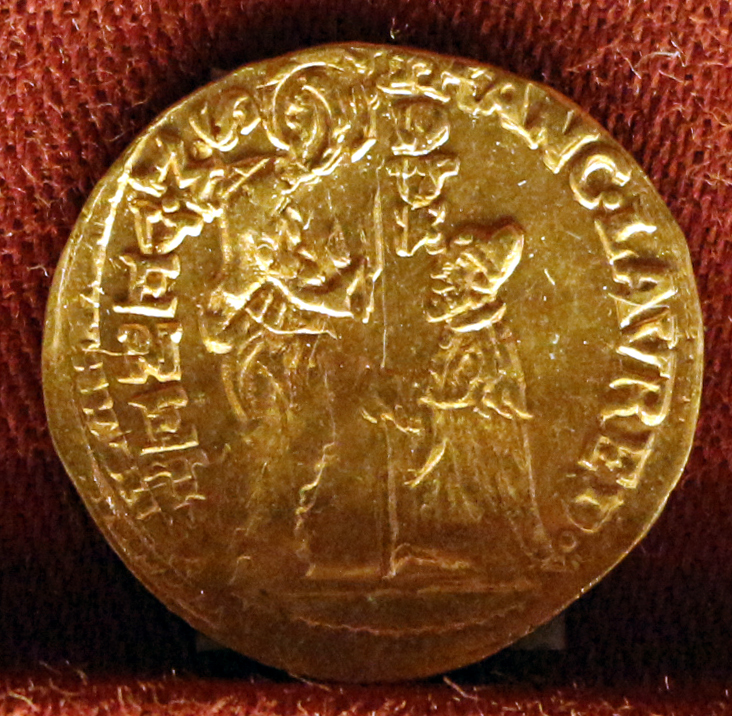
Sequin featuring Doge Francesco Loredan, 1750s

The clearest quantitative evidence for the family's eighteenth-century fortune comes from Francesco Loredan, doge from 1752 to 1762. Giacomo Nani described the Loredans as a family of the “first class”, meaning one of the very rich families of the Venetian aristocracy. Francesco himself declared revenues of almost 11,000 ducats in 1741. By the end of his life his income exceeded 118,000 ducats, although this figure must not be confused with net wealth.

His expenditure during the dogeship demonstrates the ability of the family to mobilise very large amounts of capital. In 1758 alone he spent almost 43,000 ducats on expenses associated with the dogeship. His expenditure during his first year in office exceeded 117,000 ducats. Of this, 6,250 ducats were spent on furs alone, and the cost of his electoral celebrations has been estimated from the surviving accounts at more than 38,600 ducats. Contemporary and later estimates varied considerably: one 1772 document in the Loredan files gave a figure of 90,000 ducats, while Samuele Romanin estimated approximately 21,700.

Francesco's wealth was not limited to land and houses. He actively invested in commercial enterprises. In 1758 he recorded an investment of 9,000 ducats in the olive oil trade. More significantly, he invested 22,500 ducats in the Venetian printing and bookselling business known as the Insegna della Fortuna Trionfante a San Salvador, operated by Francesco Pitteri and equipped with six presses. Francesco acquired shares in the enterprise in 1741 and 1759. The investment ultimately performed poorly: the printing works generated only several hundred ducats a year in the family's accounts, and after Francesco's death his brother Giovanni sold the family's remaining share for 10,000 ducats, although the purchaser subsequently accumulated debts of nearly 20,000 ducats to the Loredans.

These figures also illustrate an important qualification to descriptions of the Loredans as simply “rich”. Their fortune consisted to a large extent of land, buildings, investments and other assets whose value could be considerable without necessarily being immediately liquid. Francesco Loredan's enormous expenditure during his dogeship required borrowing and financial transactions secured against property. In 1751 he and his brother raised 30,000 ducats against properties near Rovigo and Badia Polesine; in 1755 Francesco borrowed a further 18,000 ducats from Elisabetta Corner Foscarini for the “urgent needs” of the dogeship. A property transaction involving the Rezzonico and Bon families in the same year was worth almost 59,000 ducats and was used in part to deal with Loredan debts.

The family also had substantial obligations arising from dowries and intra-family lending. A dowry of 46,000 ducats brought by Caterina Corner on her marriage to Francesco's brother Girolamo in 1726 remained only partly repaid decades later. Francesco himself lent 6,000 ducats to his brother-in-law and 9,000 ducats to his brother Giovanni in 1755. At Francesco's death, substantial portions of these sums remained outstanding. When Francesco died in 1762, inventories and subsequent judicial assessments indicate that his immediate estate faced approximately 19,275 ducats in residual debts relating to household expenses and property charges. Treccani consequently characterises the family's position at his death as troubled particularly by debt and liquidity, notwithstanding its enormous underlying property holdings.

=== The nature of the Loredan fortune ===
The evidence therefore suggests that Loredan wealth changed in character over the course of the family's history. Medieval fortunes were closely connected to maritime commerce, long-distance trade, moneylending and the commercial opportunities of Venice's Mediterranean empire. During the Renaissance, commercial wealth was converted on an extraordinary scale into palaces, land and political influence. Marriage alliances added major estates to the patrimony, while overseas possessions and feudal lordships gave the family interests extending from the Venetian mainland to the Adriatic and the Aegean.

By the eighteenth century the family had become, above all, a great landowning and property-owning dynasty. Its wealth was dispersed among palaces and urban tenements in Venice, agricultural estates and villas on the mainland, feudal property in Istria and Dalmatia, and financial and commercial investments. The surviving figures do not permit a reliable calculation of the family's total net worth at any single date, but they demonstrate the extraordinary scale of its resources.

== Estates ==
=== Lands ===
Among the more substantial land possessions and estates privately held by the family throughout history were the island of Antiparos in Greece, parts of the islands of Tinos and Mykonos, the towns of Bertinoro, Loreo, Ormelle, and Vangadizza in northern and central Italy, as well as Barban and Rakalj on the Istrian Peninsula in Croatia.

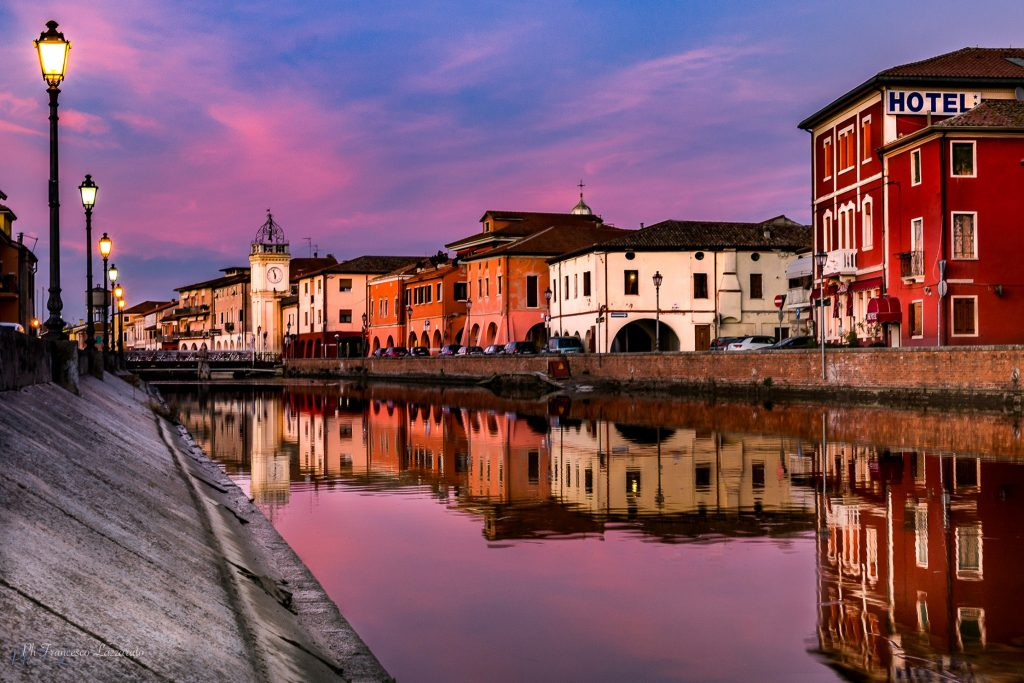
Loreo, a town in the Veneto thought to have been founded by the Loredan family around the beginning of the 9th century

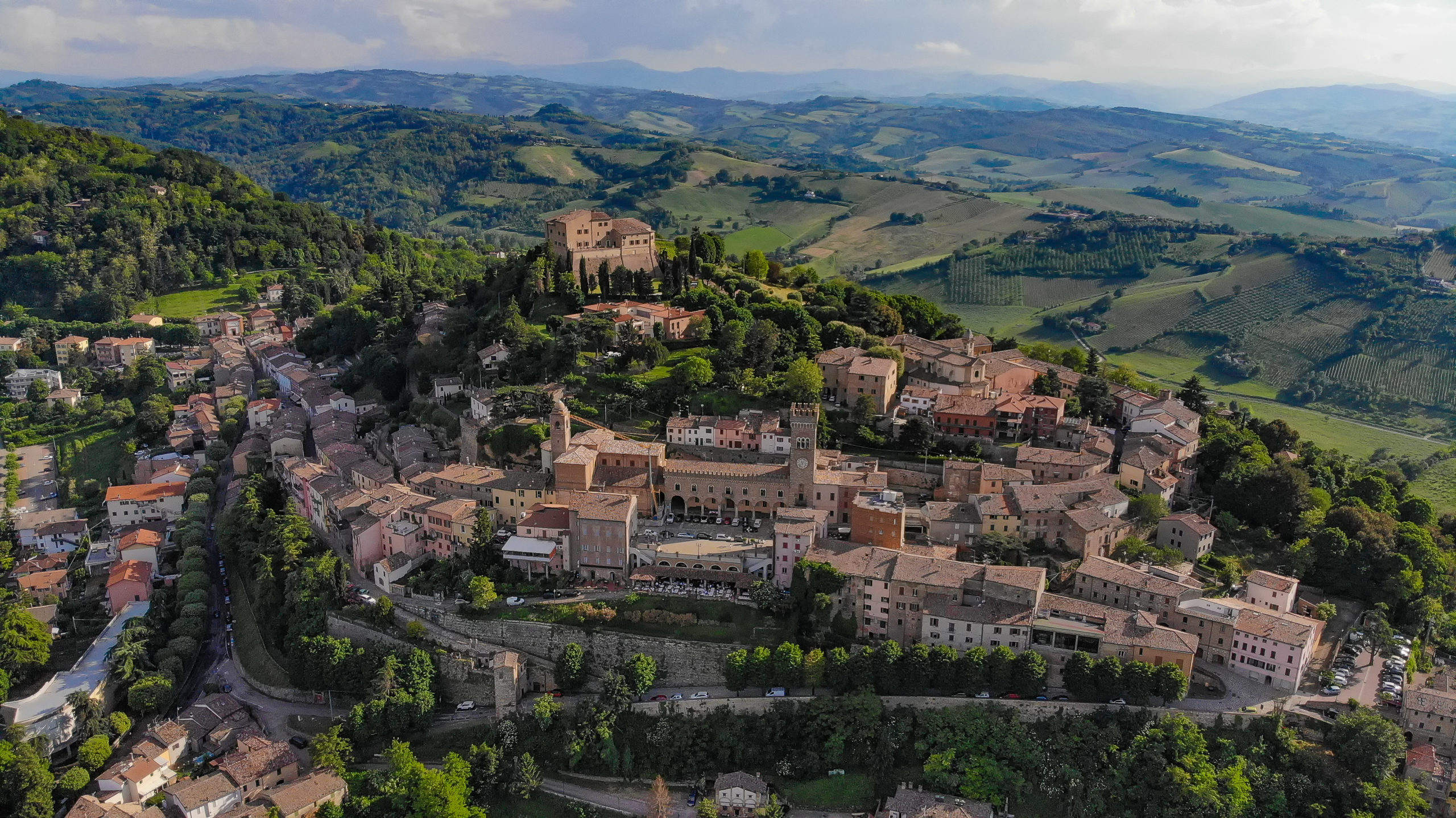
Bertinoro, Emilia-Romagna, owned by the family in the Middle Ages

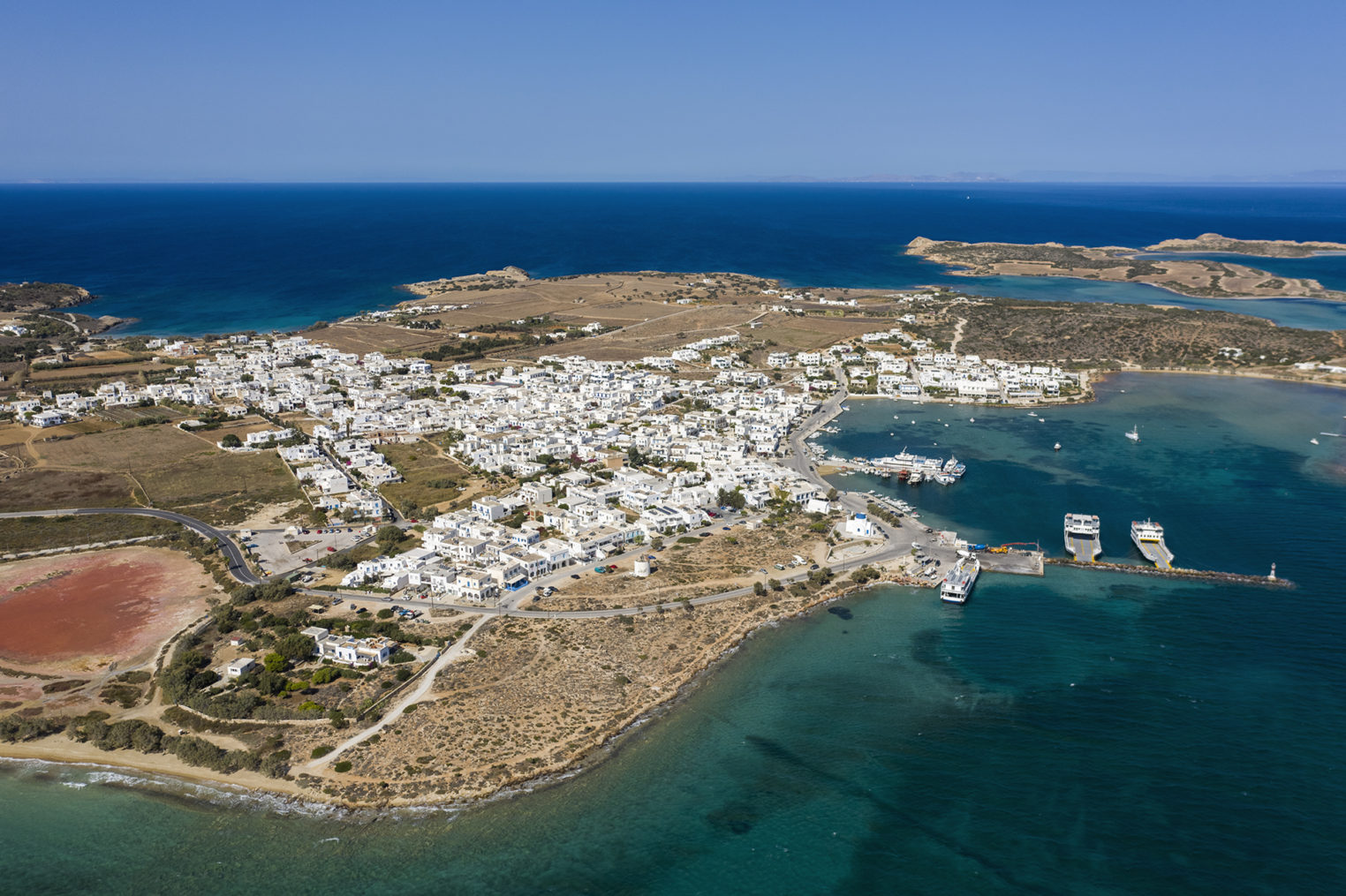
Antiparos, a Greek island owned by Giovanni Loredan and his family in the 15th century

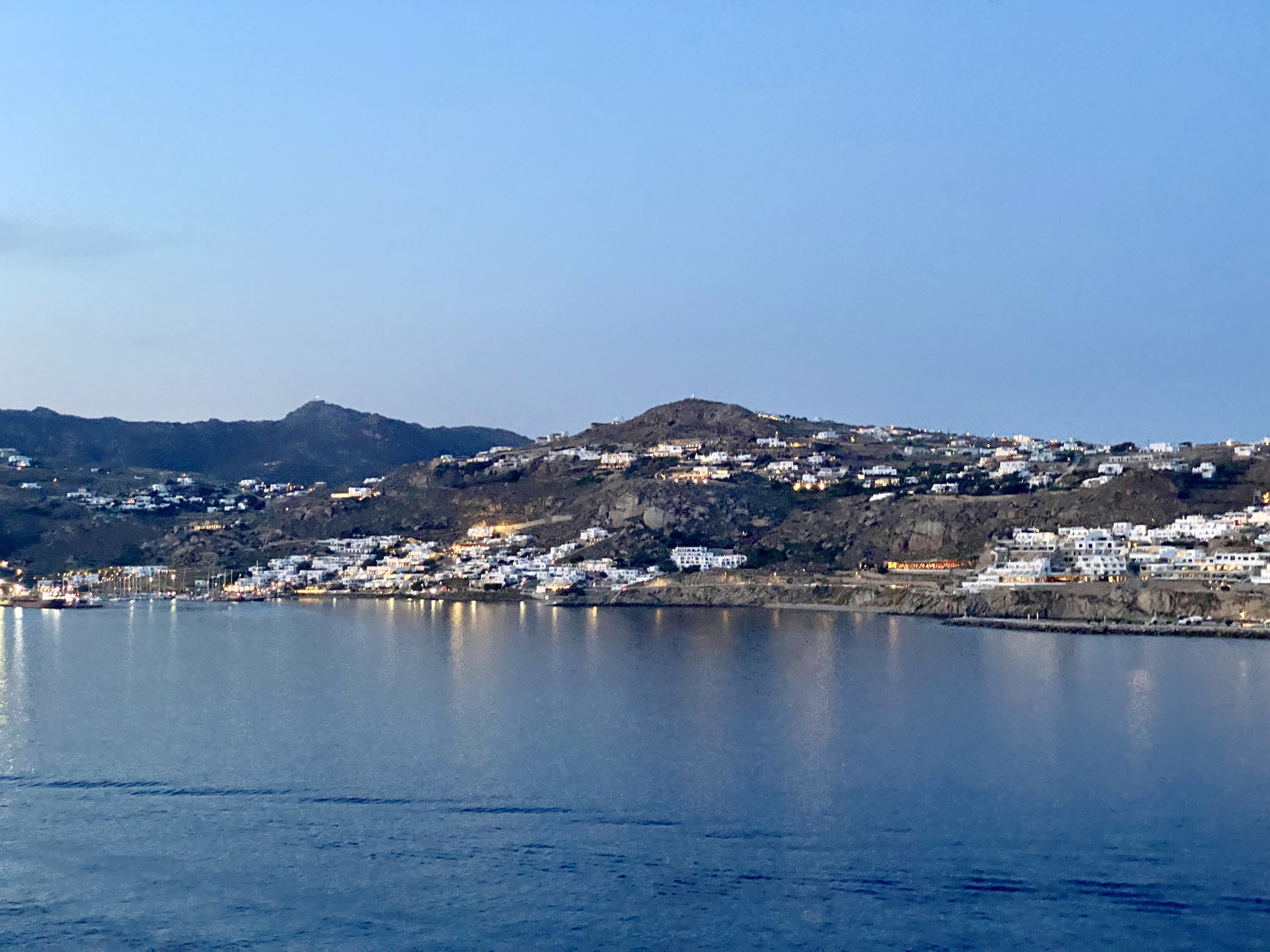
Mykonos, a Greek island where the Loredans owned mills, houses, inns, and agricultural lands from 1468 until 1518

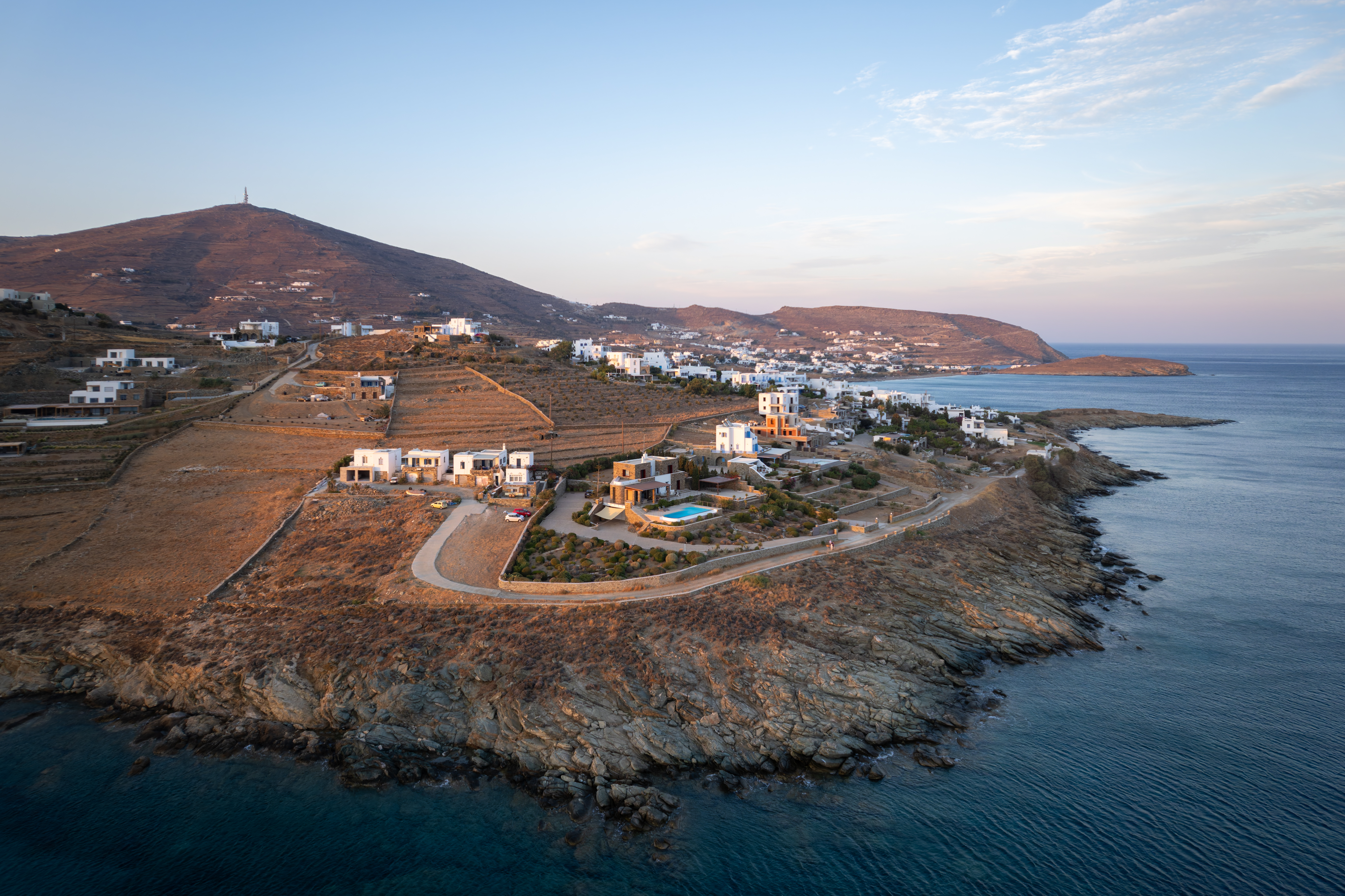
Tinos, a Greek island where the Loredans held extensive possessions and economic interests from 1468 until the 18th century

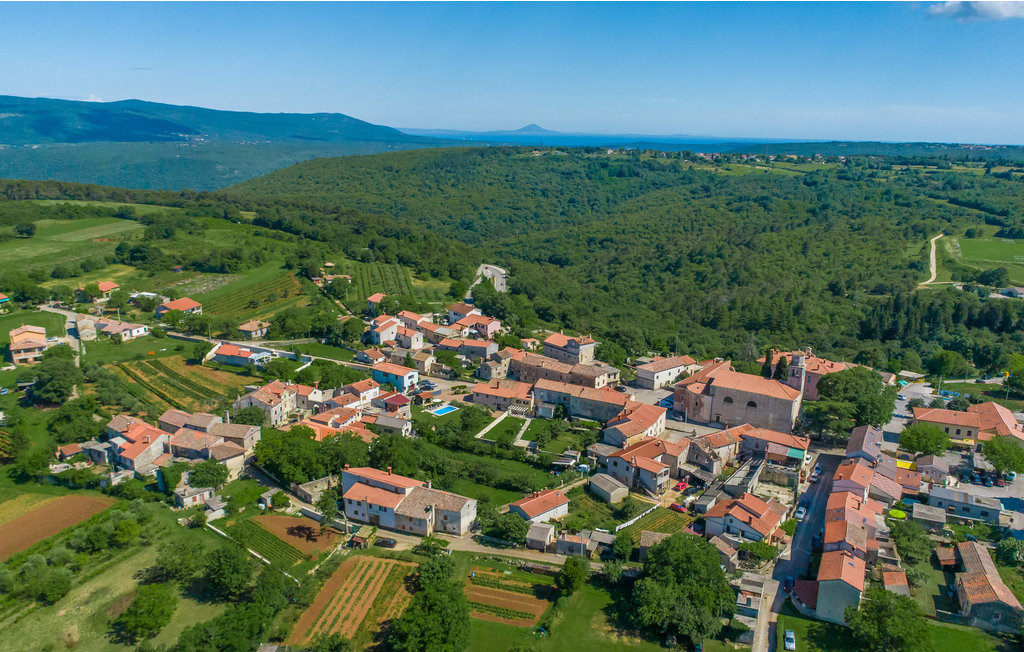
Barban, one of the family's Istrian possessions, acquired in 1535

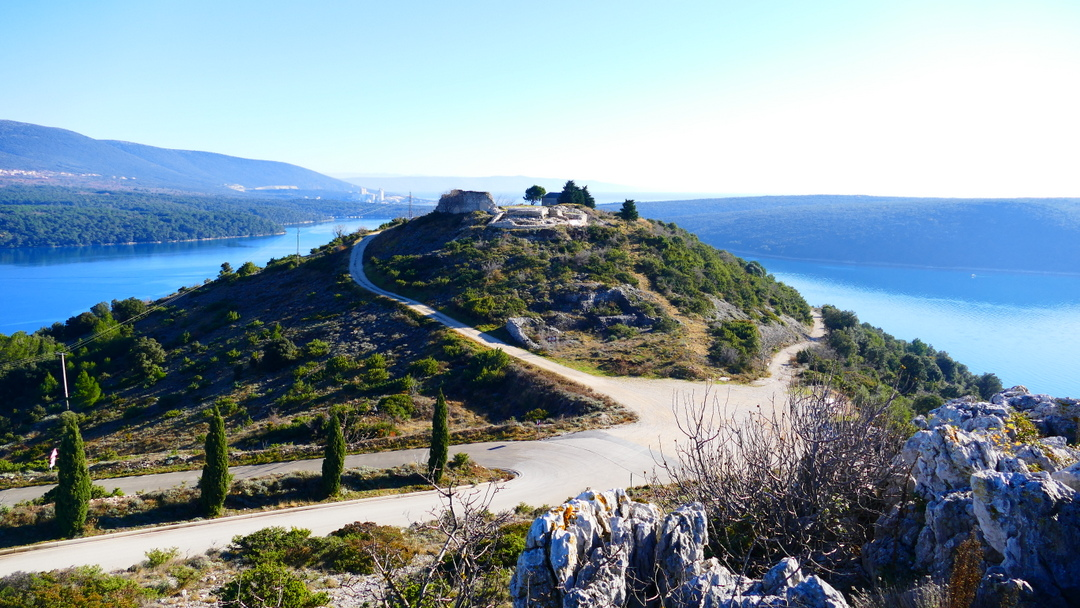
Rakalj, in Istria, was one of the family's preferred summer residences from the 16th to the 19th century.

==== Antiparos ====
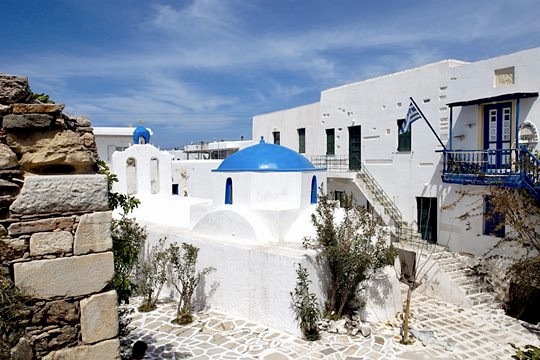
Castle of Antiparos, built by Giovanni Loredan in the 15th century.

The Loredan family acquired the Aegean island of Antiparos in the 15th century through Giovanni Loredan's marriage to Maria Sommaripa, a member of the family that ruled Paros. At the time, Antiparos had been severely depopulated by pirate raids and was described as having few inhabitants. Giovanni Loredan undertook to repopulate and develop the island at his own expense, bringing in cultivators and constructing the Castle of Antiparos around 1440. The castle was conceived not simply as a residence but as a fortified settlement, centred on a strong cylindrical tower and surrounded by houses arranged within a roughly square enclosure; the settlement subsequently expanded beyond the original fortified core. Within a few decades, Giovanni transformed a largely deserted and vulnerable island into a settled and fortified possession. Around the year 1480, Antiparos passed from the Loredan family to the Pisani family in connection with the marriage of Domenico Pisani to Fiorenza Crispo, daughter of the Duke of the Archipelago.

==== Tinos and Mykonos ====
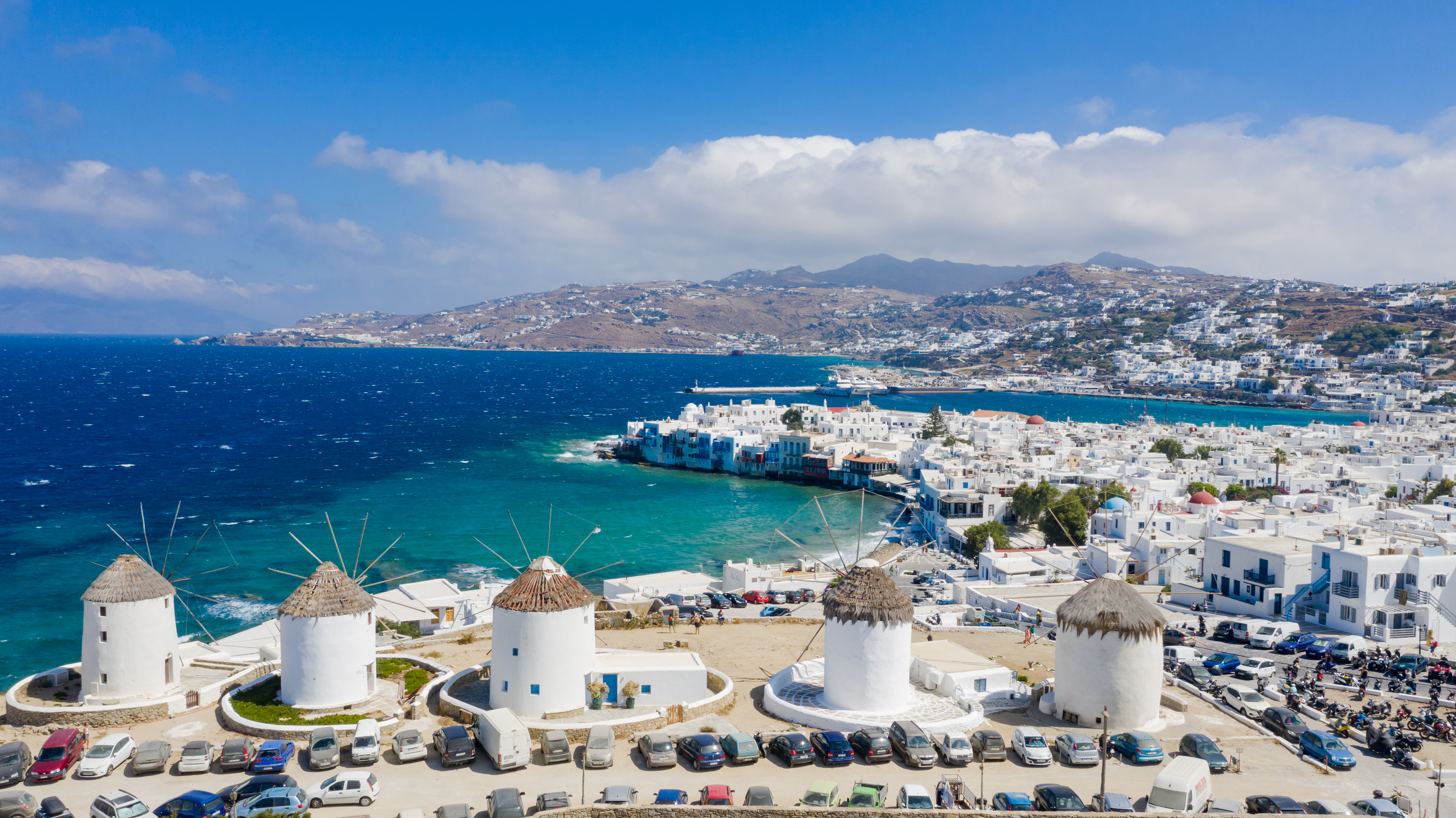
The picturesque windmills of Mykonos, built by the Venetians in the 16th century.

During the 15th century, the Loredan family accumulated a substantial landed estate and associated economic interests on the Venetian-held islands of Tinos and Mykonos. Their holdings included agricultural properties and the infrastructure through which the land could be exploited, including cultivated fields, vineyards and other productive holdings, together with houses, buildings and installations connected with agricultural production. The family also acquired rights and revenues associated with the use of these properties, giving them an important position within the islands' rural economy. On Tinos, the Loredans' interests extended to strategically significant property such as the unfinished tower of Agios Nikolaos, which Marco Loredan proposed to complete and fortify at his own expense, while elsewhere their holdings were integrated into the agricultural and commercial life of the island. The tower at Agios Nikolaos was an existing defensive structure whose foundations probably went back to the tower described by the Florentine monk Cristoforo Buondelmonti when he visited the Aegean around 1415–20. Furthermore, the Loredan property around Oxomereia was substantial. On Mykonos, the Loredans acquired several houses inside the fortified settlement. They also sought property around useful anchorages and productive areas, while the proposed legal rights and commercial privileges they obtained were complementary to the economic structure of the enterprise.

Agricultural estates supplied food and other commodities. Livestock provided further agricultural income. The windmill allowed grain to be processed locally, while the inn and residential properties generated income from the movement of people through the islands.

The harbour was particularly important. The Loredans' request for commercial privileges there indicates that they regarded maritime traffic as an essential part of the economic potential of their holdings. The ability to supply ships and travellers with food, wine and other necessities connected the Loredan estates with the wider Aegean commercial network. This made the Loredan presence substantially different from a collection of isolated rural estates.

==== Barban and Rakalj ====
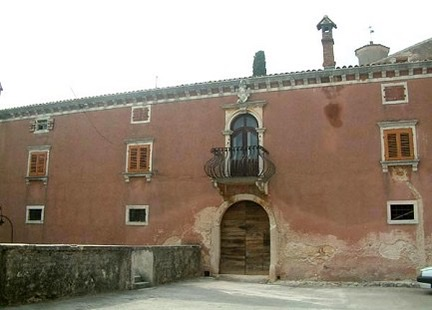

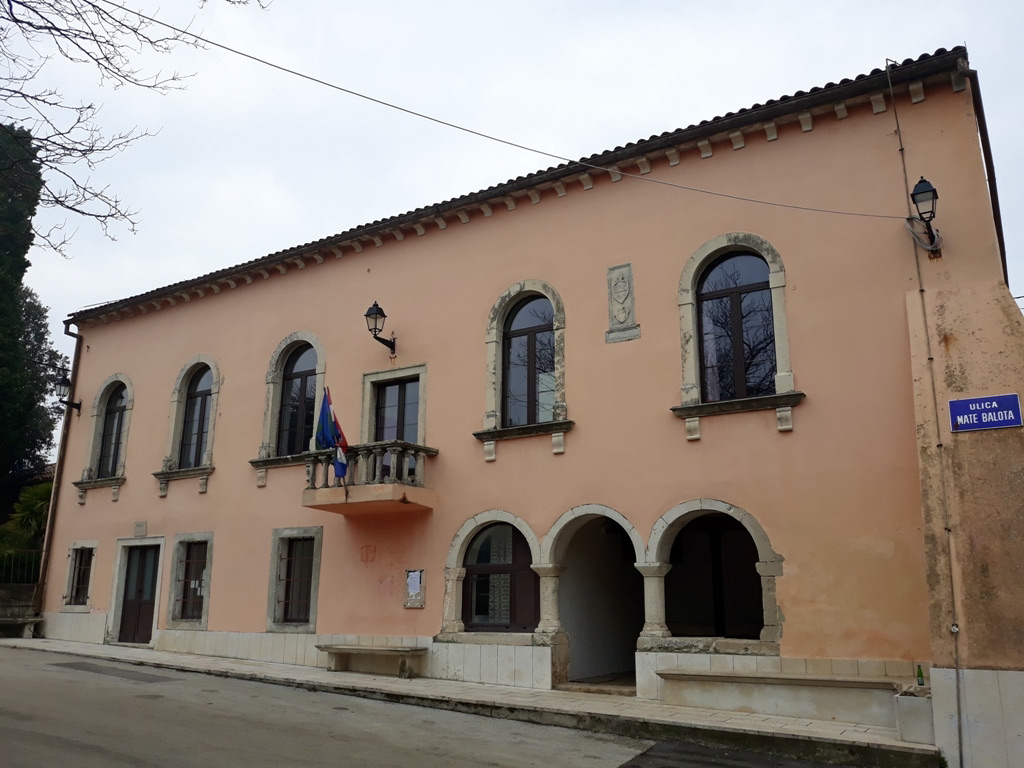
Loredan palaces in Barban and Rakalj, built in the 16th century.

On 23 December 1535, the Loredan family acquired the town of Barban in Istria (in modern Croatia) for 14,760 ducats, and ownership was held by the brothers Leonardo, Lorenzo and Francesco, of the Santo Stefano branch. At the time, Barban also included Rakalj, and the two territories were organized as a separate feud owned by the Loredan family, who owned it until the abolition of feudal rights in 1869.

When the family acquired the towns, they built a palace in Rakalj, where they first settled. However, in 1606, the already existing castle in Barban was transformed into the family's primary Istrian palace. Still, the family made the town of Rakalj their summer residence due to its more pleasant climate and coastal location. The family managed the feud through their officer who held the title of captain. The captain held judicial and political power and, through time, the Loredan lords introduced a complete legal and economic system to govern the vast 13,000-hectare (32,120-acre) estate.

The Loredan Ordinances

The Loredan Ordinances (Croatian: Loredanske terminacije) were written orders of the Loredan family for the Barban and Rakalj fief. They were created for the purpose of communication between the masters who were in Venice and the family representatives in Istria. From them we can learn about the internal structure of the fief. The captain had political and judicial power, and was appointed by the Loredans. He had to reside permanently on the estate and participate in the election of prefects, deputy prefects and other officials. He had a chancellor who recorded all the documents in special books, and he also took care of the distribution of grain. Twelve judges, the prefect and the deputy prefect took care of the supply, solved smaller disputes and imposed lesser sentences. Church and fraternal goods were managed by the gastald and the municipal money was collected by the chamberlain. The Loredan terminations also deal with the prohibition of deforestation, management of municipal property, maintenance of cleanliness, burial of the dead, running of the fair, teaching of religion, civil law provisions, etc.

Since the Loredans were the feudal owners of the towns, all residents from that area had a number of obligations to the family. The first painful obligation was selling wine. The wine had to be sold to the inn chosen by the Loredans, at a price defined by the Loredans. Then the innkeeper would continue to sell the same wine at a much higher price, giving a percentage to the Loredans. In a situation like this, the villagers would get an awfully low price so they preferred to hide their wine in "unofficial" taverns, smuggling it and selling it on the black market. The outcome of this was that, in really good years, the Loredans had a very low income from the wine. Villagers would explain that the wine was drunk by their family members "so there was not much left to sell to the innkeeper". That is why the Loredans announced their first official decision (Termination) on 6 October 1614. The decision determined in advance how much wine each family must sell to the innkeeper, whether the year was good or bad. By their decision the Loredans prohibited the wholesale of wine, or the sale of wine at a price different from the one they defined. There were also penalties for violation of the decision: whipping, imprisonment or exile to a galley. Since one decision did not solve anything, more decisions soon followed. However, the people weren't born yesterday; each decision they cunningly bypassed. To avoid one of the decisions the peasants started to pour water into wine which they had to sell to the innkeeper. As soon as the Loredans discovered the trick, they announced a new decision—pouring water into wine was forbidden. The next decision, due to the poor quality of the wine, determined the exact date when vintage begins... and so on.

The Ordinances are kept in the Croatian State Archives in Rijeka.

==== Vangadizza ====
The Abbey of Vangadizza and its extensive lands and revenues were controlled by the Loredan family from 1484 to 1608.

The Loredan family held the commendatory abbacy of the Abbey of Santa Maria della Vangadizza at Badia Polesine from the late 15th until the beginning of the 17th century. The abbey had entered the system of commendatory administration in 1435, when the pope assumed the right to appoint the commendatory abbot. Under this arrangement, the commendatory abbot exercised ecclesiastical jurisdiction over the abbey's territorial district, presided over its chapter and administered its extensive temporal possessions and revenues, while a separate claustral abbot or prior retained responsibility for the internal monastic community. By the Late Middle Ages, Vangadizza was one of the wealthiest ecclesiastical establishments of the Venetian mainland, with lands, rights and dependent churches extending across large parts of the Polesine, the Veronese, Paduan and Vicentine territories, and into the Bolognese area. The abbey's substantial landed income made the commendatory benefice an attractive source of patronage for prominent Venetian families.

The Loredan connection developed in the aftermath of the War of the Salt (1482–1484), when the Polesine passed from Este to Venetian rule. The benefice was particularly associated with the Loredan branch of Santo Stefano. Among its holders was Francesco Loredan (1512–1569), a prominent jurist and churchman who served as commendatory abbot of Vangadizza by 1548 and was a candidate for the Patriarchate of Venice in 1554. His position is attested in contemporary ecclesiastical correspondence, while later scholarship identifies him as a member of the Santo Stefano branch and emphasises the importance of the abbacy within the family's network of patronage. Documents from 1600 record that Abbot Francesco contributed 2,000 ducats towards the completion of the monumental funerary monument of his ancestor, Doge Leonardo Loredan.

The Loredans also left a visible architectural mark on the abbey. The surviving bell tower at Vangadizza preserves evidence of interventions made under its commendatory abbots: after the bell chamber was rebuilt by Ambrogio Bernardo in 1517, its later pyramidal terracotta roof was constructed under Francesco II Loredan. The family's wider economic position was likewise strengthened by the revenues associated with the commendatory benefice. Contemporary and modern scholarship has connected these revenues with the family's acquisition and enlargement of its Palace of Santo Stefano in Venice and with the broader accumulation of landed wealth by the branch during the 16th century.

The Loredan tenure ended amid a major dispute over the future of the abbey. Following the death of Francesco III Loredan in the early 17th century, competing claims emerged between the Camaldolese congregation and the papacy over the right to appoint the next abbot. This provoked a dispute with the Venetian government, which regarded the papal interference as an infringement of its traditional rights and interests in ecclesiastical affairs within the Republic. The dispute became entangled with the wider conflict between Venice and the papacy over ecclesiastical jurisdiction and the control of religious benefices. In 1608–1609, the Venetian Republic commissioned a series of legal and theological consultations from Paolo Sarpi concerning the status of Vangadizza. Pope Paul V had meanwhile appointed his nephew, Cardinal Scipione Caffarelli Borghese, as commendatory abbot, while the Camaldolese sought the restoration of the abbey to their own jurisdiction.

The episode brought the long Loredan association with Vangadizza to an end. A contemporary account recorded the abbey as producing as much as 12,000 scudi annually and described it as being in the possession of monsignor Loredan, identified as Francesco III Loredan, the last Loredan abbot. The subsequent settlement transferred the commendatory benefice away from the Loredans and marked the beginning of a period in which Vangadizza was increasingly administered by bishops and cardinals from outside the local Venetian patriciate.

=== Palaces ===
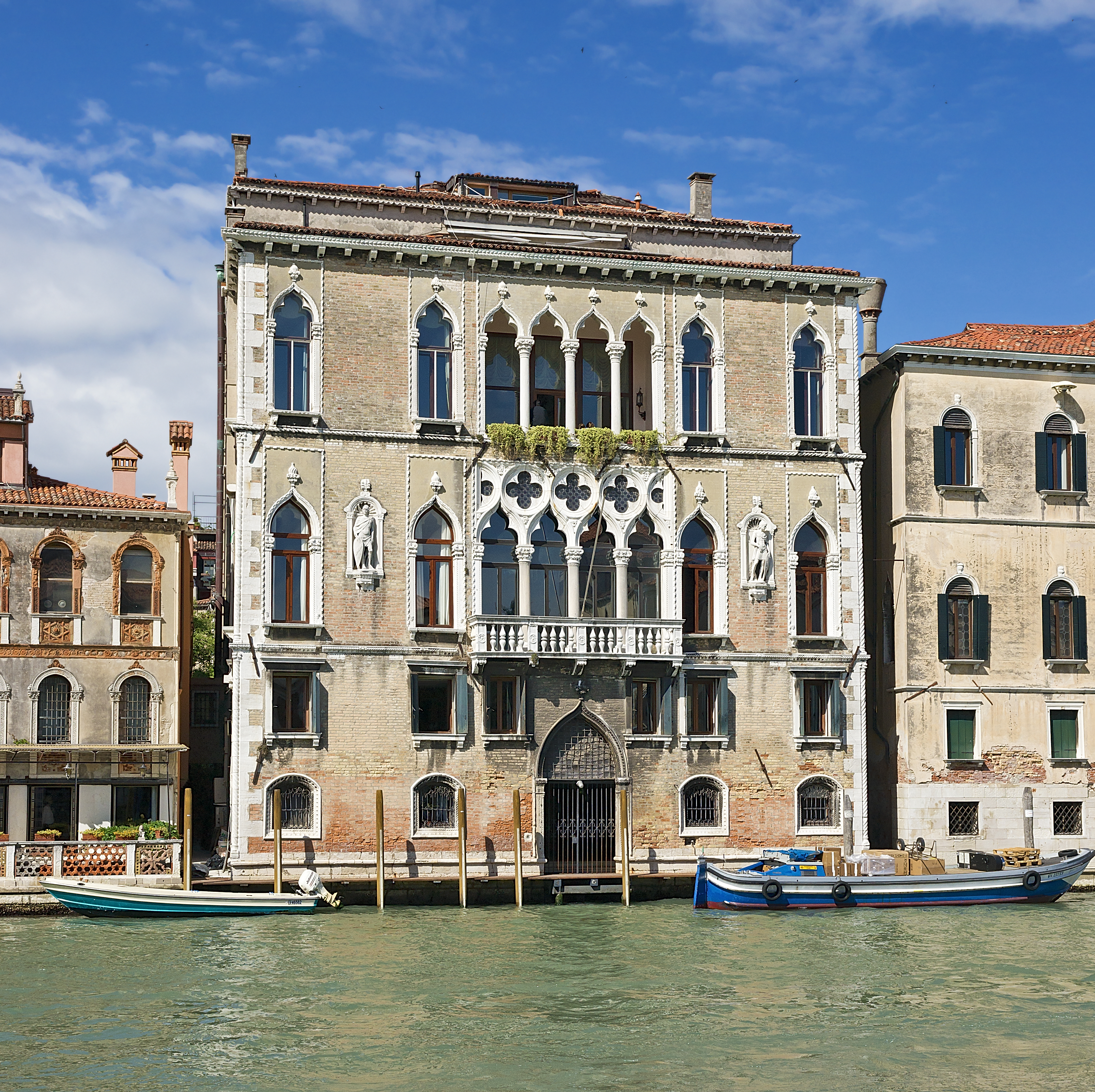
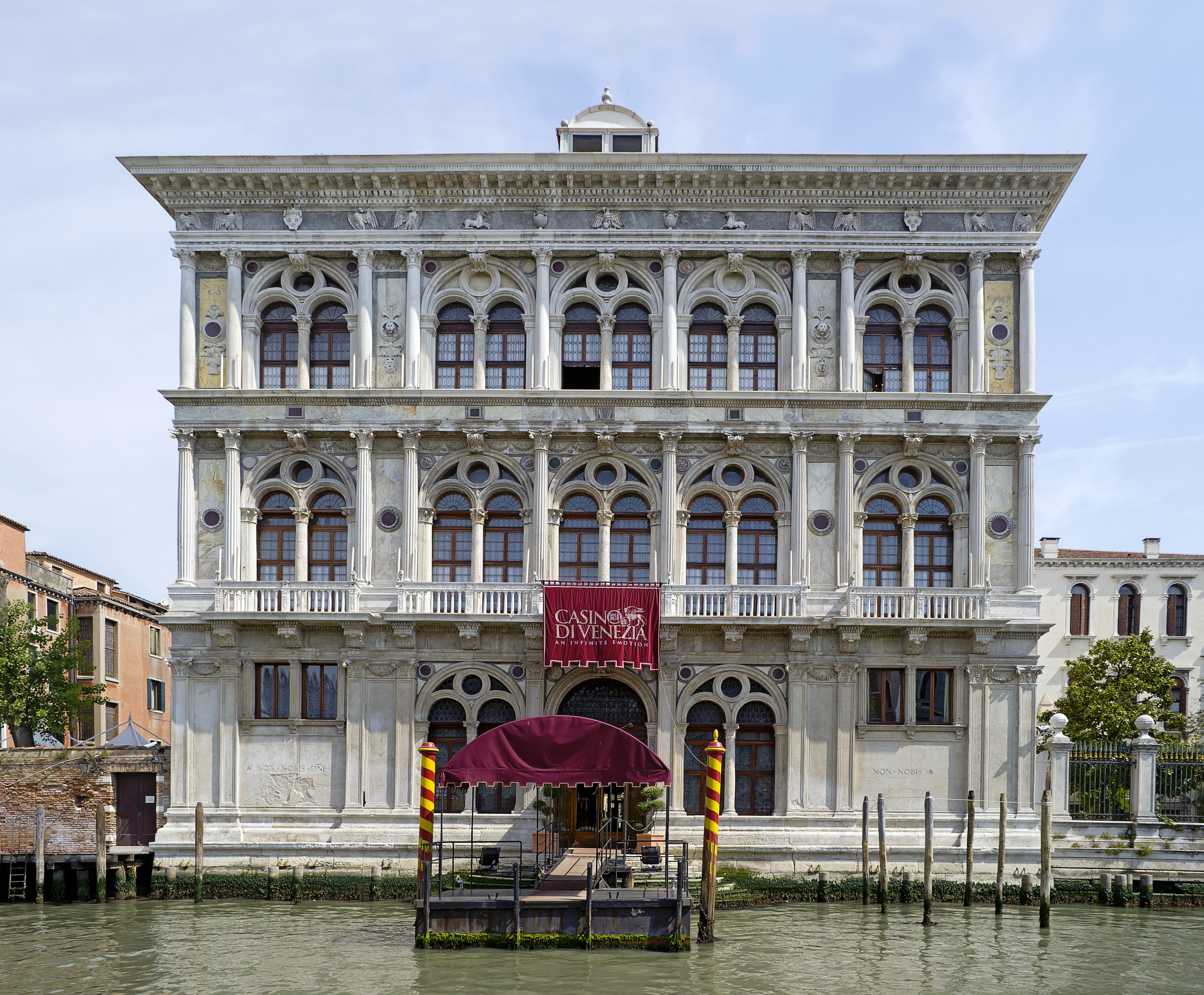
Palazzo Loredan dell'Ambasciatore and Ca' Loredan Vendramin Calergi, 15th-century palaces on the Grand Canal in Venice

The Palazzo Loredan dell'Ambasciatore on the Grand Canal derived its popular name as the residence of the ambassador of the Holy Roman Empire, which was offered as a residence for the Imperial ambassador by Doge Francesco Loredan. The great collector in the family was Andrea Loredan who constructed a palazzo on the Cannaregio to designs by Mauro Codussi; it was paid for by Doge Leonardo Loredan; it was bought in the eighteenth century by the Vendramin family, and the Ca' Loredan Vendramin Calergi is notable today for its association with Richard Wagner. Palazzo Loredan in Campo S. Stefano is today the Venetian Institute of Science, Literature and Arts, and it holds the busts of famous Venetians which form the Panteon Veneto. Palazzo Loredan Cini, a Gothic style palace located on the Grand Canal, has a large collection of precious artworks which are on permanent display on the first floor of the palace. Ca' Loredan, whose main facade features polifora windows, is today home to the city's municipal council. The Palazzo Giustinian Loredan is still today owned by the family. Palazzo Loredan Gheltoff is a 14th/15th century early Gothic palace located at Calle dell'Aseo in the Cannaregio district of Venice. Palazzo Loredan a San Cancian is a palace of the San Cancian branch of the Loredan family located at Calle Larga Widmann in the Cannaregio district of Venice, near the Church of San Canciano after which it was named.

=== Villas ===
In the terraferma there are numerous Loredan villas—at Strà on the Brenta Canal; at Paese, near Treviso, the villa painted by Francesco Guardi; at Asolo; at Sant'Urbano, near Padua. The domain of the Villa Loredan at Paese was planted with grapevines in the 1950s by Count Pietro Loredan; the award-winning wine continues to be made under the label Conte Loredan Gasparini.

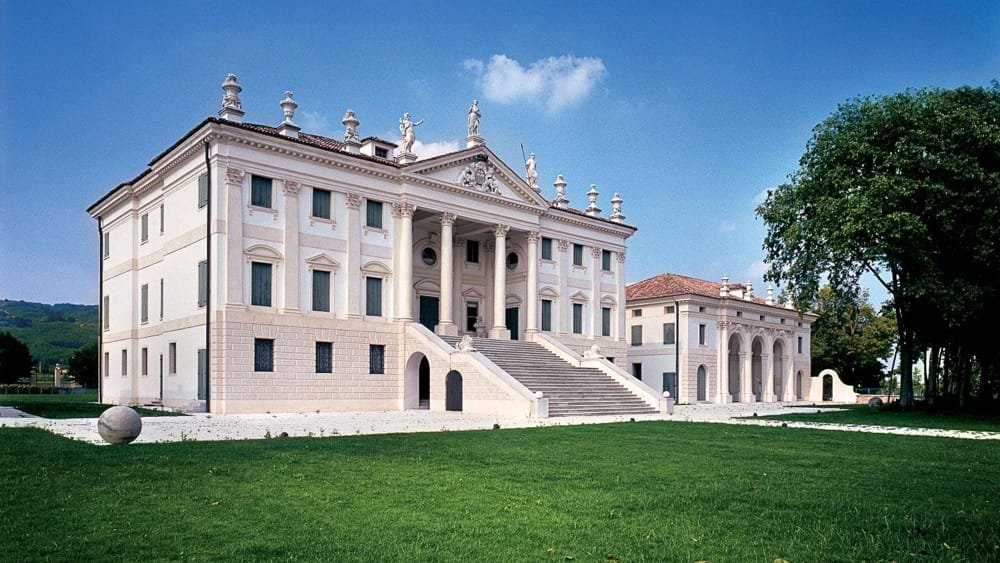
Villa Loredan in Montello

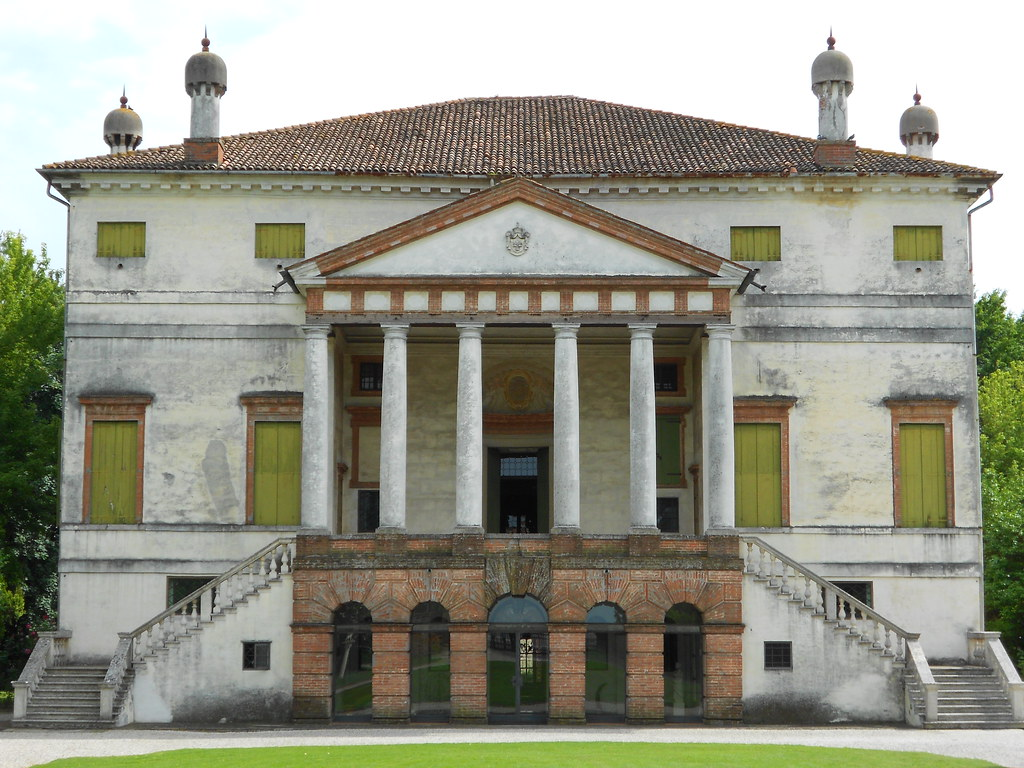
Villa Loredan Grimani in Fratta Polesine

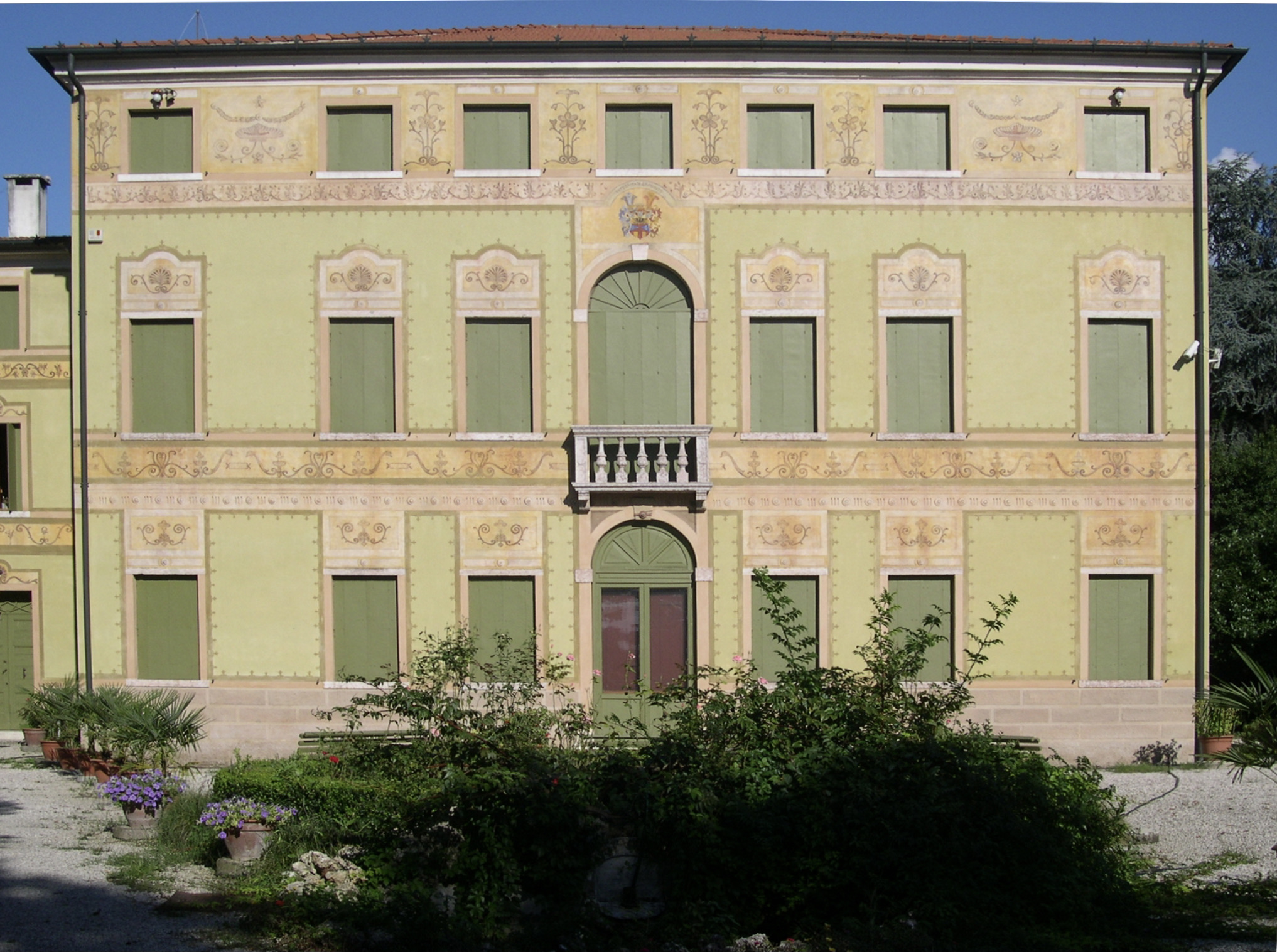
Villa Loredan Morosini in Resana

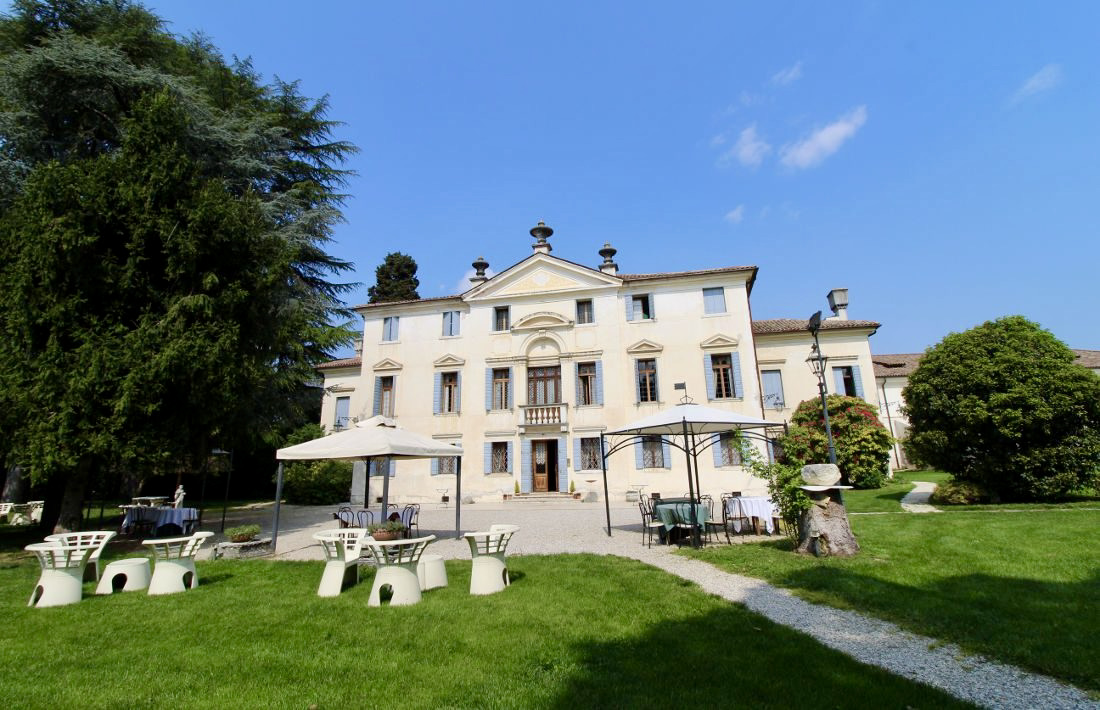
Villa Razzolini Loredan in Asolo

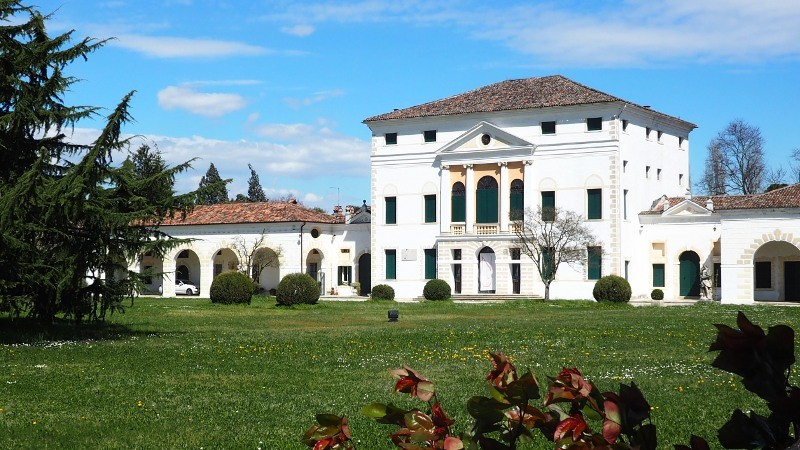
Villa Loredan at Carbonera

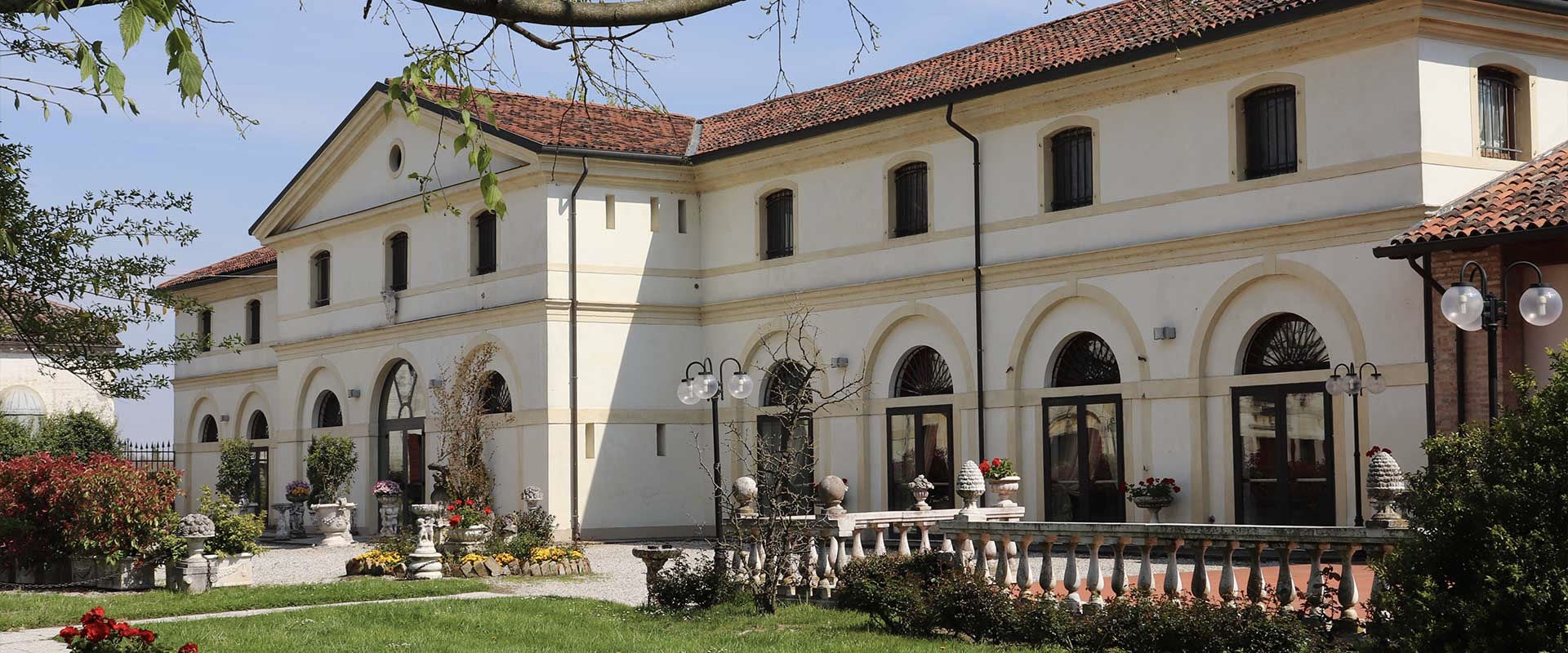
Villa Marcello Loredan Franchin in Ceggia

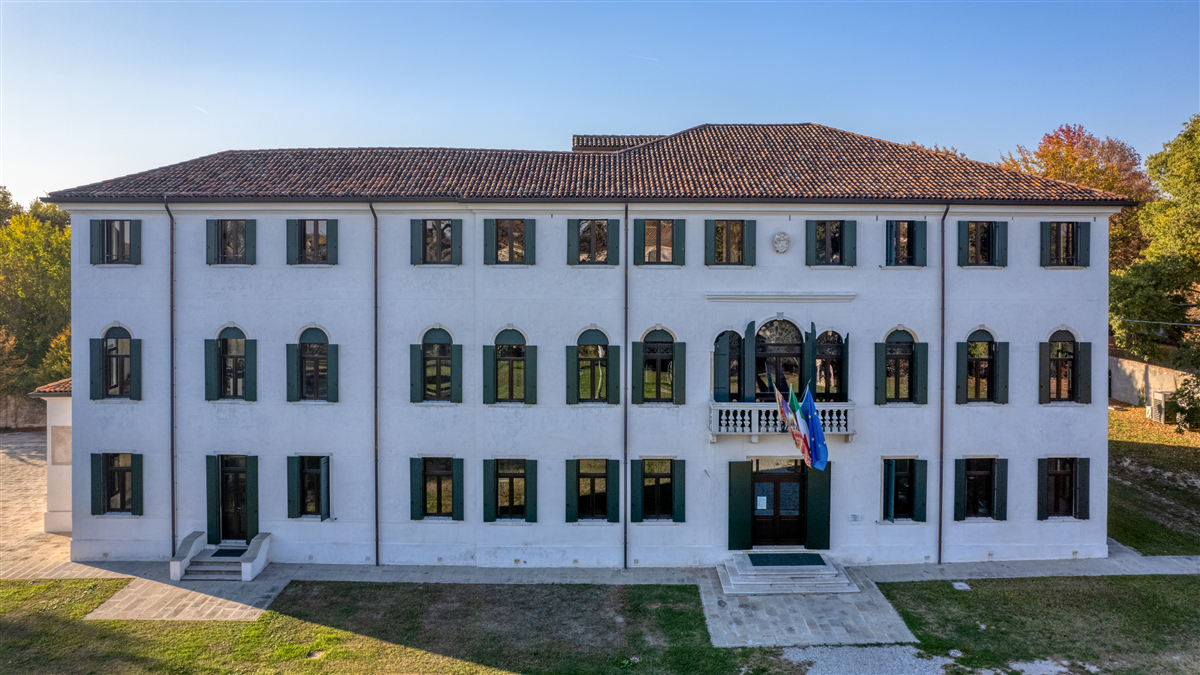
Villa Loredan at Stra

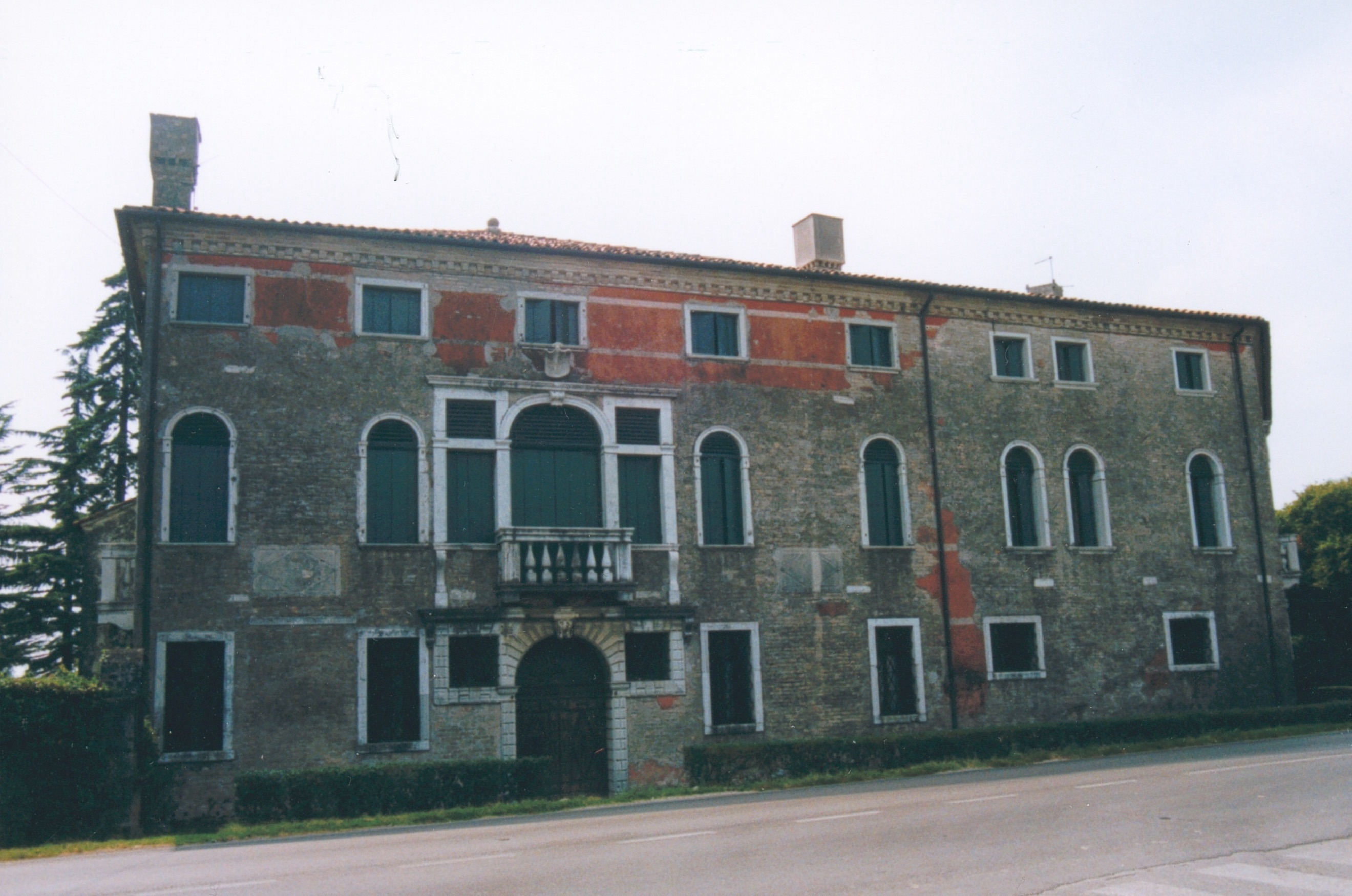
Villa Loredan Gritti in Oderzo

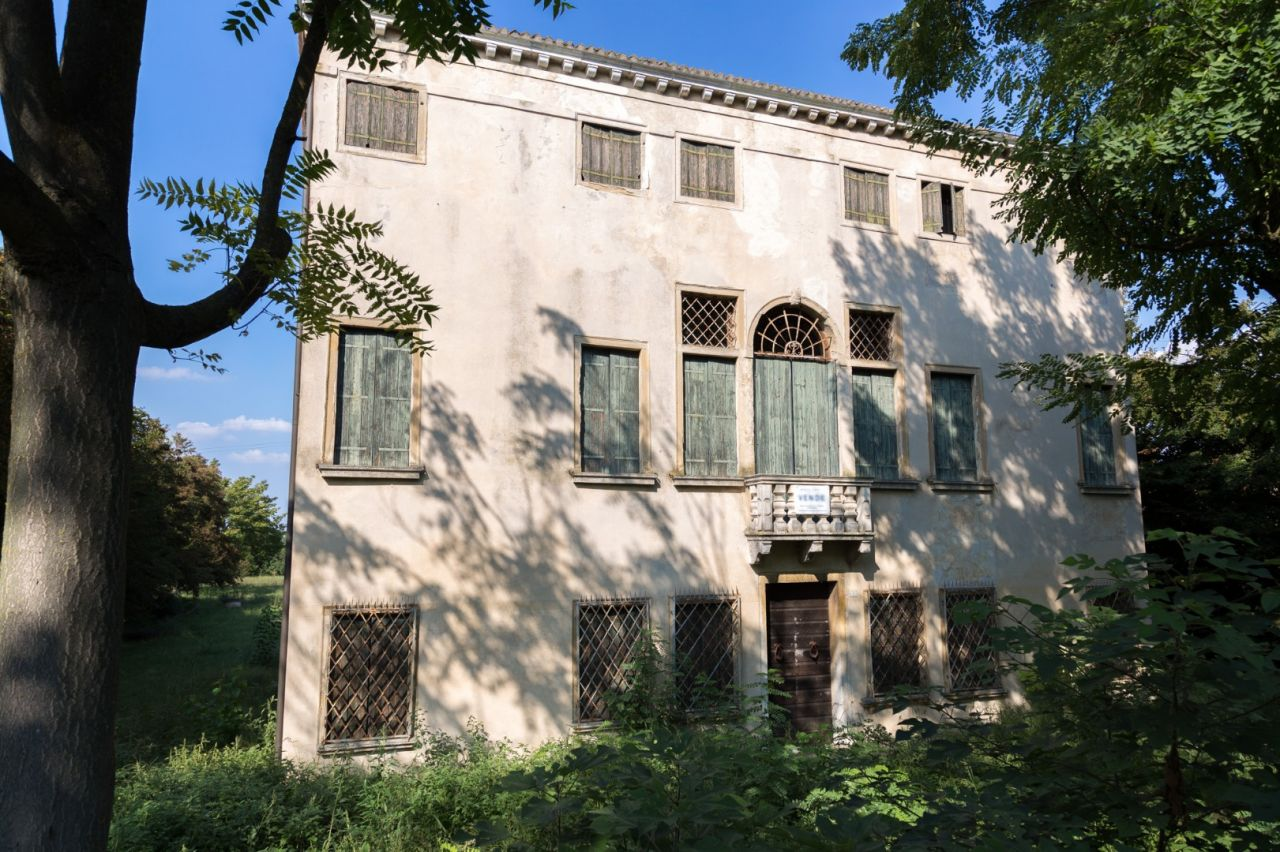
Villa Nani Loredan in Sant'Urbano

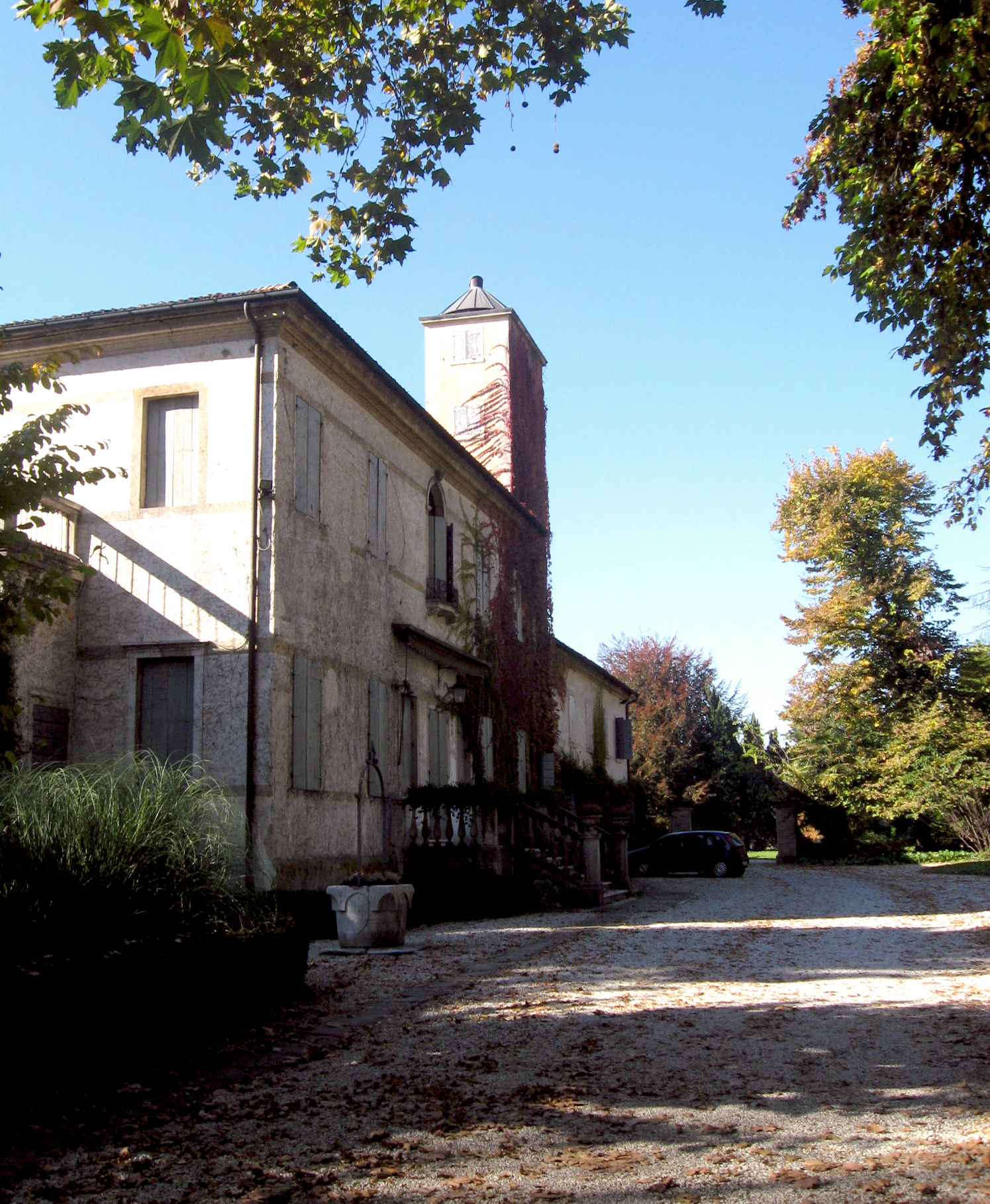
Villa Loredan Bragadin in Noventa Padovana

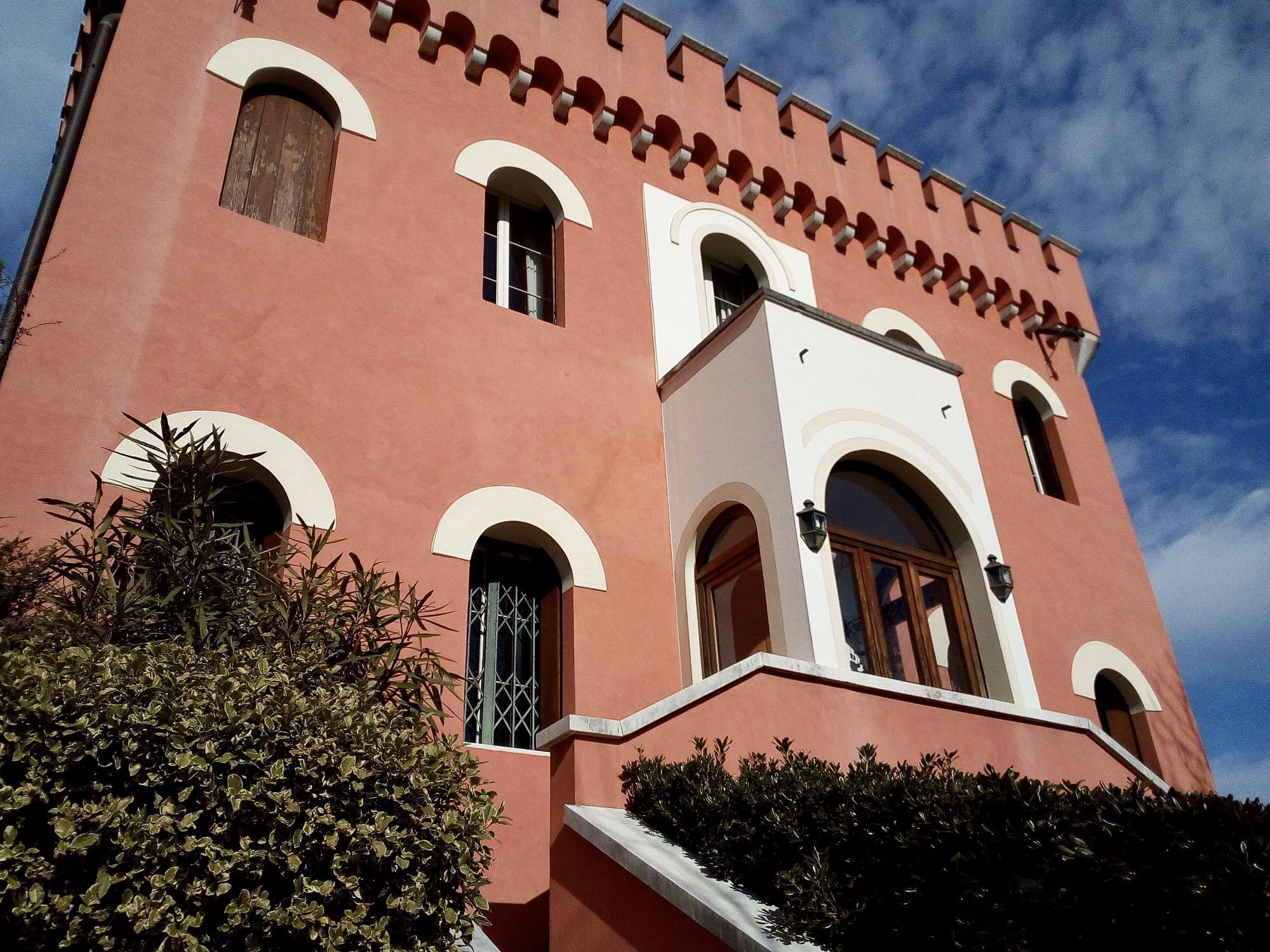
Villa Loredan van Axel in Montebelluna

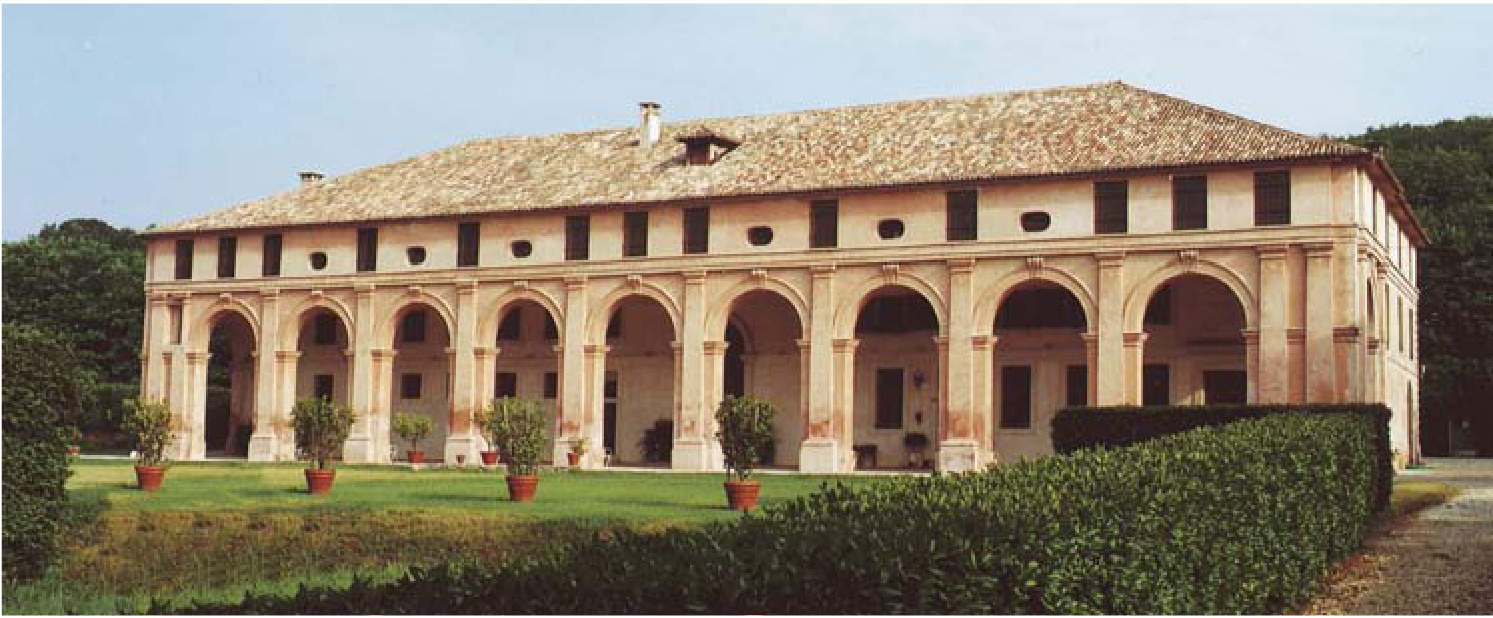
Barchessa Loredan in Selva del Montello

=== Depictions in art ===
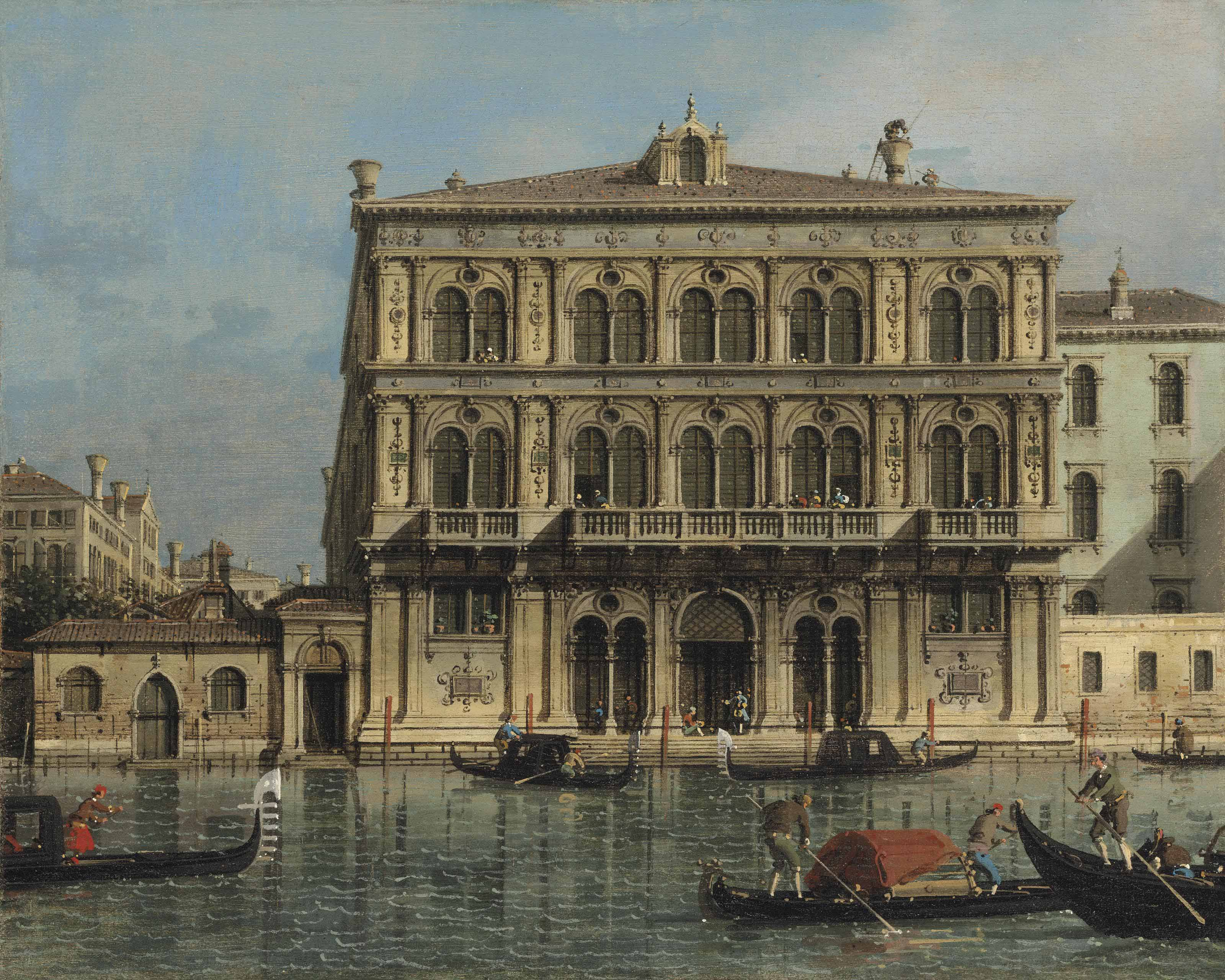
Palazzo Loredan Vendramin Calergi, by Canaletto, 1750s, Private Collection

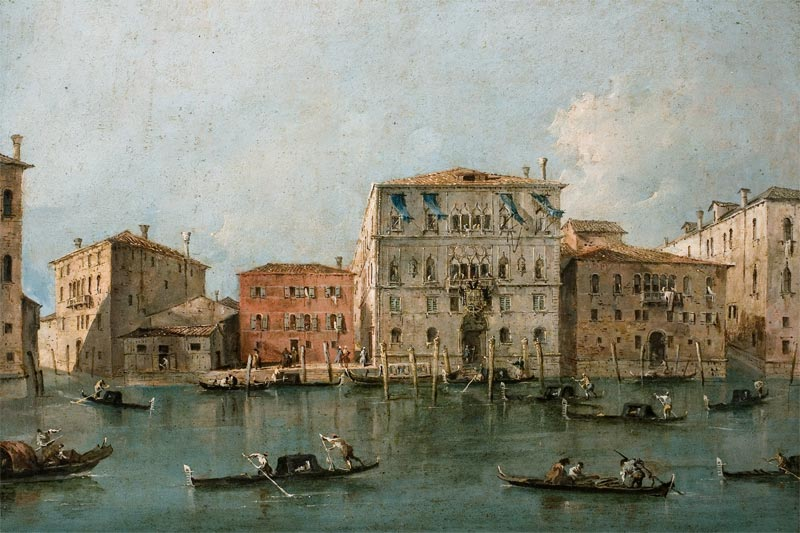
Palazzo Loredan dell'Ambasciatore, by Francesco Guardi, National Museum Cardiff

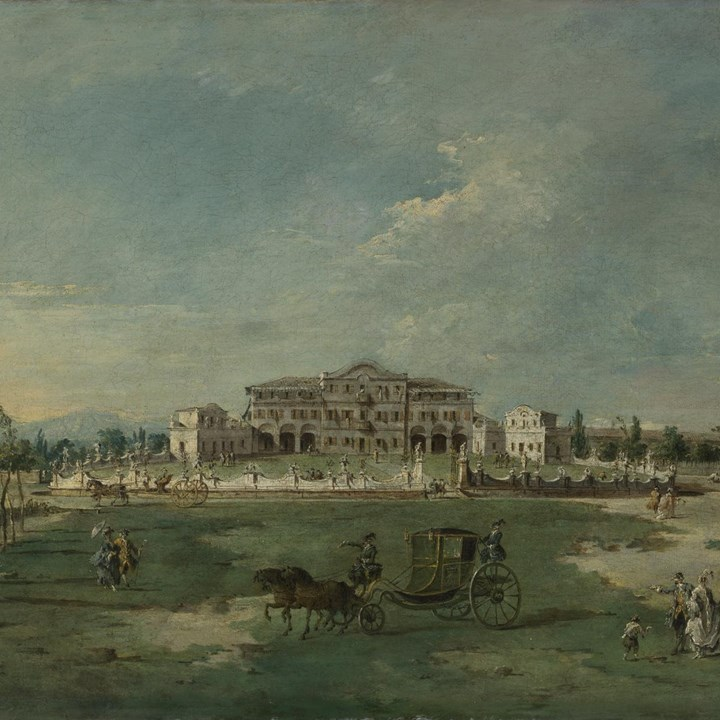
Villa Loredan del Timpano Arcuato, by Francesco Guardi, National Gallery, London

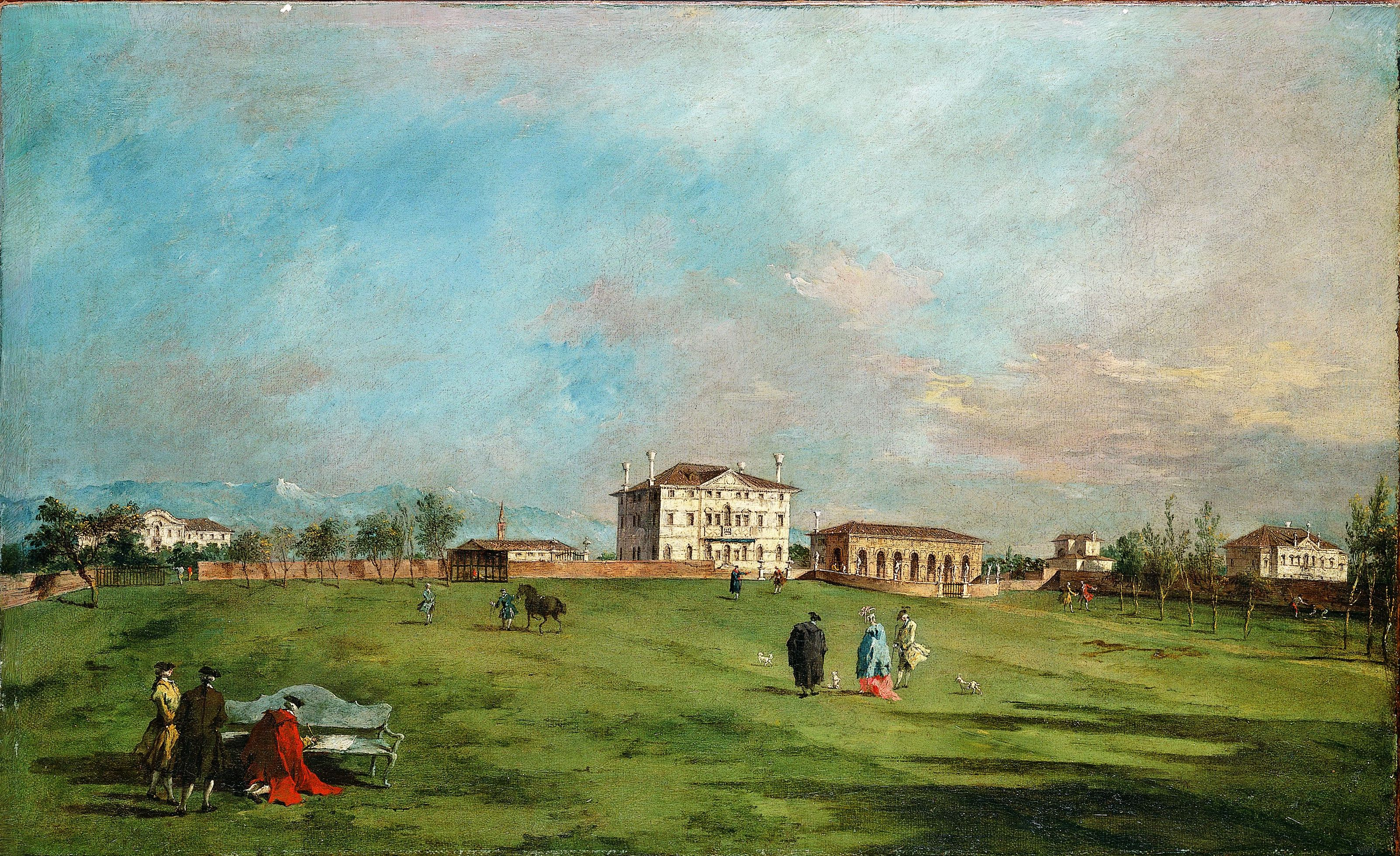
Villa Loredan at Paese, by Francesco Guardi, Metropolitan Museum of Art, New York City

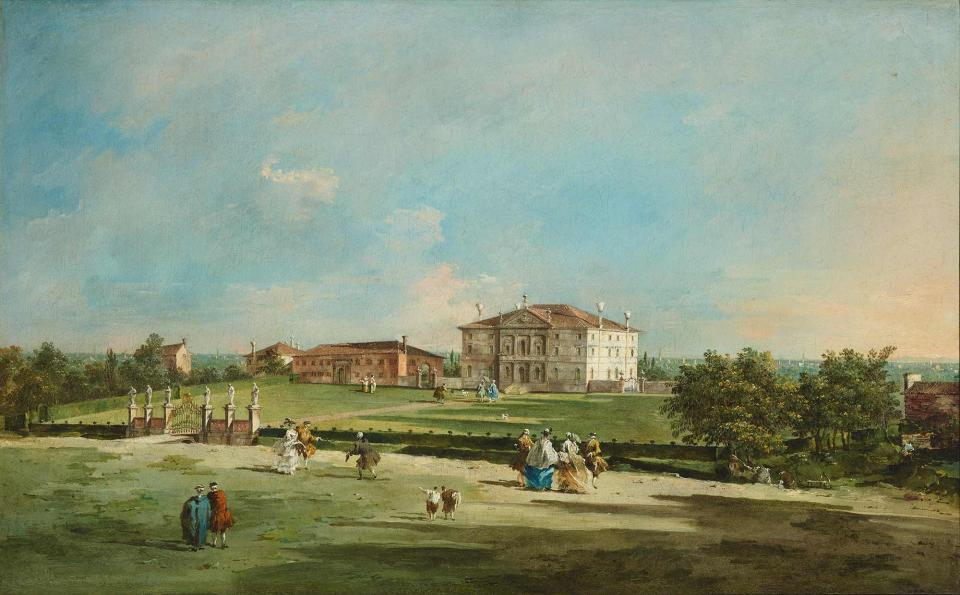
Villa Loredan at Paese, by Francesco Guardi, The Frick Collection, New York City

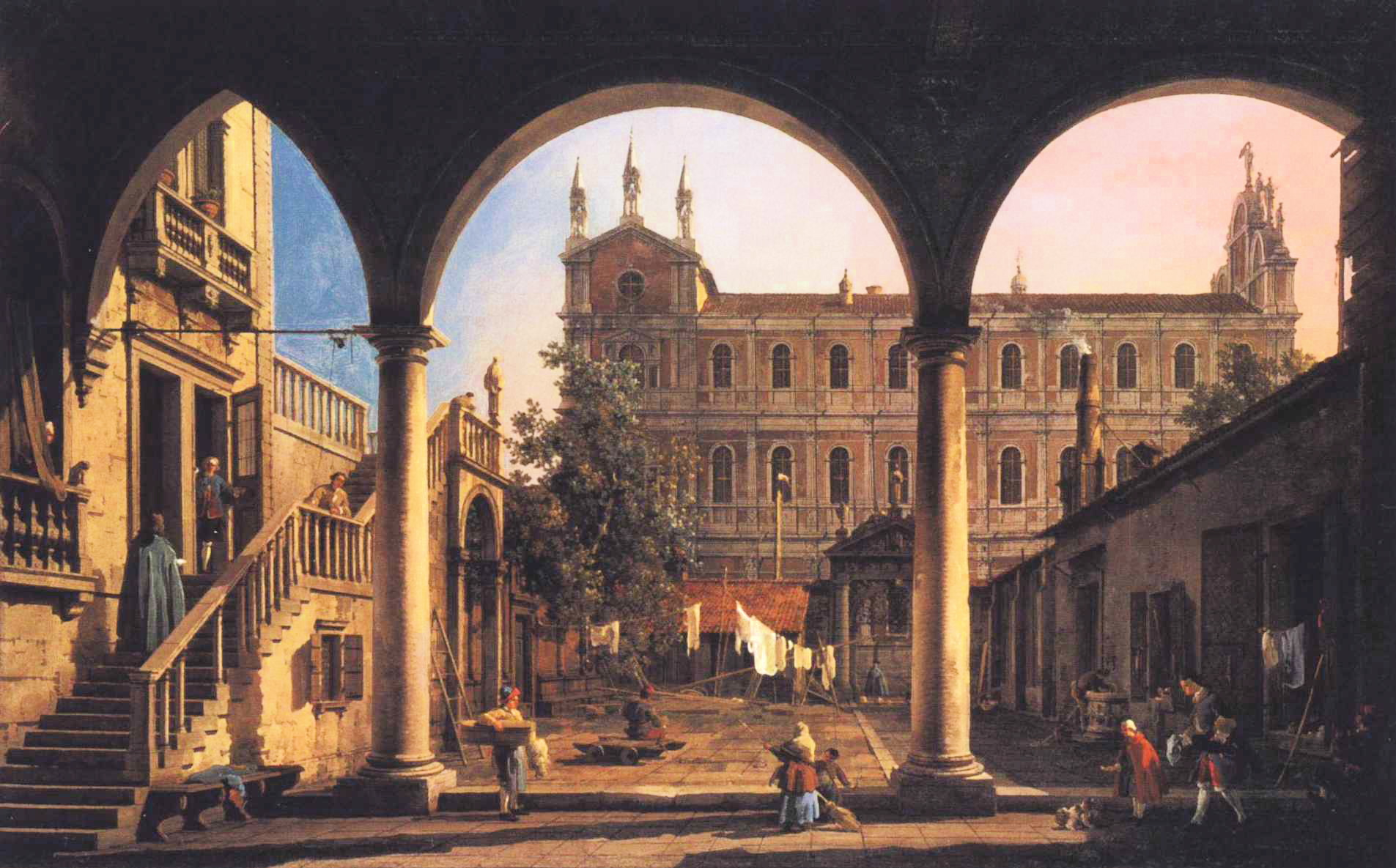
Capriccio of the Scuola di San Marco from the Loggia of the Palazzo Grifalconi Loredan, by Canaletto, 1750s, Private Collection

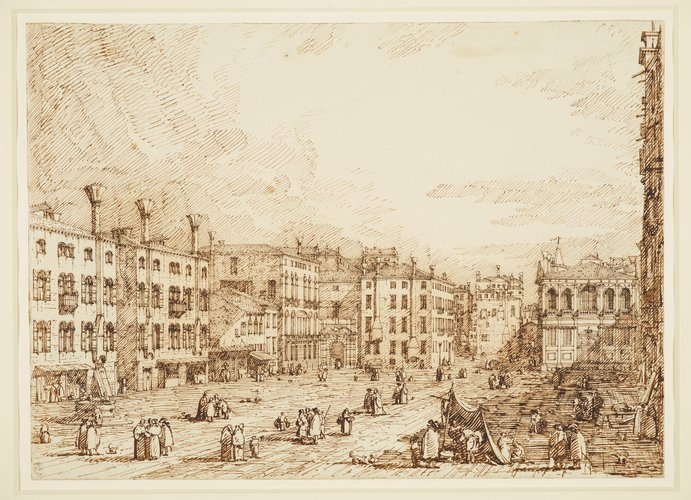
Campo Santo Stefano, by Canaletto, c. 1735–1740, featuring Palazzo Loredan in Campo S. Stefano (right), Royal Collection

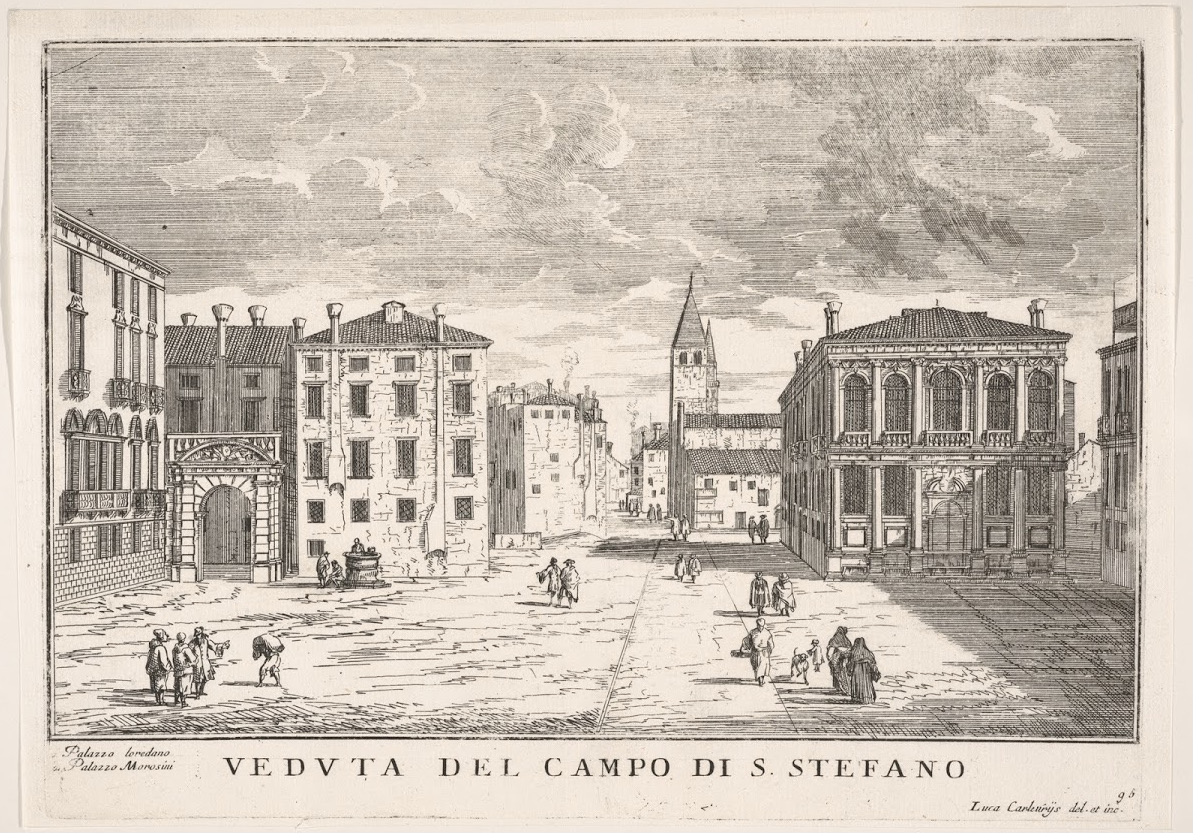
View of Campo Santo Stefano with the Loredan Palace and the Morosini Palace, by Luca Carlevarijs, 1703, Metropolitan Museum of Art, New York City

== Legacy ==
=== Impact on Jewish history ===
==== The Venetian Ghetto ====
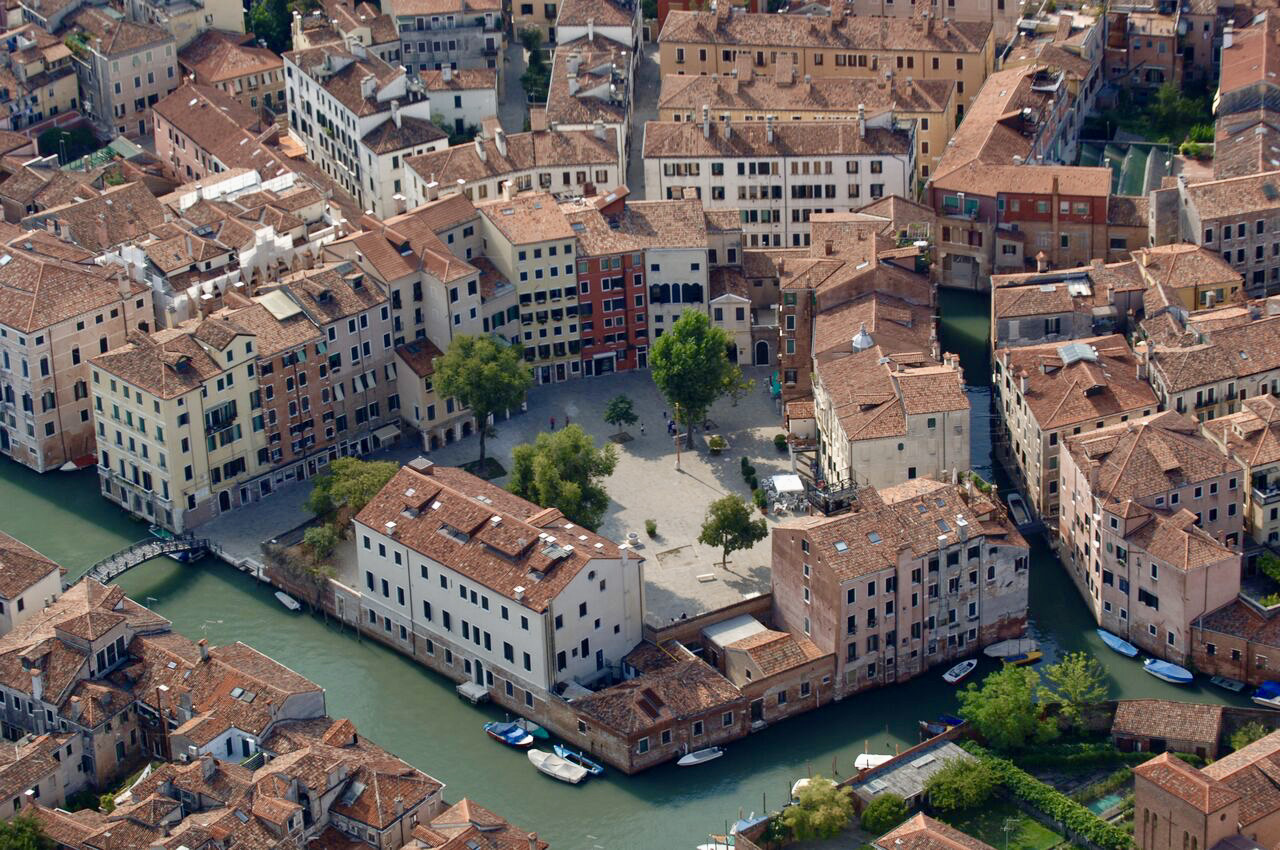
The Venetian Ghetto from above

On 29 March 1516, by decree of Doge Leonardo Loredan, the Venetian Senate declared that if the Jews wanted to continue living in Venice, they had to stay on a small island surrounded by canals in the northern part of the city. By this decision, the first Jewish ghetto in the world was created in the Cannaregio district of Venice, thus starting centuries of segregation which would spread across Europe, and the Venetian word ghèto soon became a popular term to describe isolated urban communities of ethnic minorities. Scholars believe that the Loredan government which had established the Ghetto did so because they believed that the Jews could not be integrated with the city's mainly Roman Catholic population.

Life in the Ghetto was very restricted, and the movement of Jews outside of the ghetto was difficult. Jews were locked in the ghetto at night and Christian guards on boats patrolled the narrow canals and short bridges to enforce the rules. The Jews were even forced to pay the salaries of their Christian wardens. While appallingly discriminatory, it was, for some, a shelter from even worse persecution elsewhere.

Although it was home to a large number of Jews, accounting for 1,000 people out of the city's 160,000 at the time, and mainly consisting of merchants, the population living in the Venetian Ghetto never assimilated to form a distinct, "Venetian Jewish" ethnicity. Four of the five synagogues were clearly divided according to ethnic identity: separate synagogues existed for the German (the Scuola Grande Tedesca), Italian (the Scuola Italiana), Spanish and Portuguese (the Scuola Spagnola), and Levantine Sephardi communities (the Scuola Levantina). The fifth, the Scuola Canton, was possibly built as a private synagogue and also served the Venetian Ashkenazi community. At its peak in the middle of the 17th century, nearly 5,000 Jews lived in the Ghetto. To accommodate births and new arrivals, they could only build upwards, resulting in some of the world's first "skyscrapers", which at seven or eight storeys are still some of the tallest buildings in the city.

In 1797, the French Army of Italy commanded by 28-year-old Napoleon Bonaparte occupied Venice, forcing the Republic to collapse on 12 May 1797, and ended the ghetto's separation from the city on 11 July of the same year. Today, the Ghetto is still a center of Jewish life in the city. The Jewish community of Venice, that counts about 450 people, is culturally active, although only a few members live in the Ghetto because the area has become increasingly expensive. Anniversary events are held in the ghetto and include a production of William Shakespeare's play The Merchant of Venice and a major exhibition called "Venice, the Jews, and Europe", at the Doge's Palace—the same place where the decree that started the ghetto was signed 500 years ago.

==== Relationship with the Jewish community ====
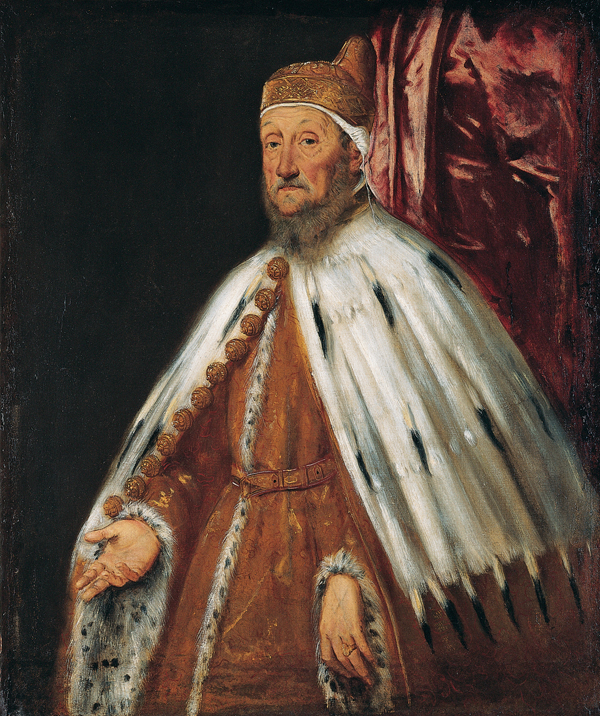
Pietro Loredan was among those who advocated for Jewish rights in the second half of the 16th century.

Despite playing a part in the creation of the first Jewish ghetto, the decision to do so was not only made by Leonardo Loredan, but by other senators who advocated for segregation believing that the presence of Jews in the city and their money lending practices would degrade the Christian morals and values of Venetian citizens. Later in the 16th century, some members of the Loredan family, including Pietro Loredan, fought in the Senate for the reduction of the sum the Jews had to pay for their "conduct".

In the 17th century onwards, the Loredans were noted for supporting and taking in Jews arriving in Venice. For instance, records exist of a Spanish Jewish family fleeing persecution in Spain whose education and conversion to Christianity was sponsored by a Loredan. As a result, descendants of these Jewish converts can be found in the former Venetian territories and the diaspora.

In the 18th century, as Captain General of the Sea, one Loredan wrote letters of recommendation for many Jews from Mediterranean cities and islands, and helped them with affording and boarding ships bound for Venice.

=== Patronage and impact on art history ===
==== Loredans in art ====
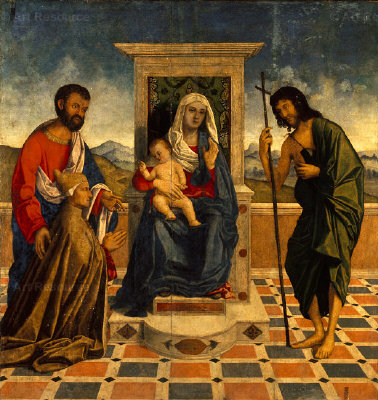
The Virgin with Child and Saints Adored by Doge Leonardo Loredan, by Vincenzo Catena, 1506, Doge's Palace

Many Loredans were portrayed by renowned artists of the Venetian School contemporaneous to the family members who had commissioned the associated artworks, and also posthumously. The most famous of these is the Portrait of Doge Leonardo Loredan, painted by Giovanni Bellini in 1501/02, around the time of Leonardo's ascension to the dogeship, and now on display at the National Gallery in London. Vittore Carpaccio's Portrait of Leonardo is another famous depiction of the doge, displayed at the Museo Correr. Another well-known depiction of him is the Portrait of Doge Leonardo Loredan with Four Sons, again by Bellini, and now on display at the Gemäldegalerie in Berlin. Leonardo Loredan was also featured in paintings by Gentile Bellini, Palma the Younger, Vincenzo Catena, Domenico Tintoretto, Carlo and Gabriele Caliari, Pompeo Batoni, Francesco Maggiotto, as well as various other painters, and in sculptures created by the likes of Girolamo Campagna, Danese Cattaneo, and Pietro Lombardo. He was also depicted posthumously in a number of paintings celebrating his victory over the League of Cambrai. The second Loredan doge, Pietro, was likewise portrayed by a number of artists; the most famous depiction of him is the Portrait by Tintoretto, painted in 1567 and now on display at the Kimbell Art Museum in Fort Worth, Texas. Palma the Younger's Doge Pietro Loredan Beseeching the Virgin is another famous depiction, located at the Doge's Palace. The third doge, Francesco, was portrayed in the 18th century by Fortunato Pasquetti and Jacopo Guarana, among others.

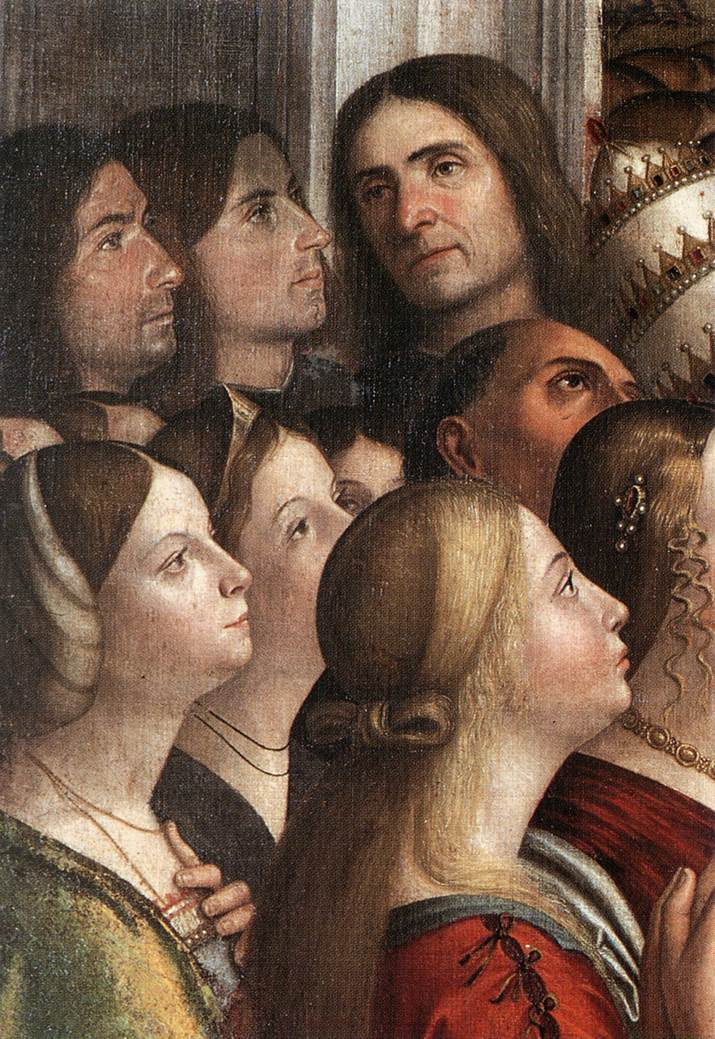
The three sons of Antonio Loredan, detail from the Apotheosis of Saint Ursula, by Vittore Carpaccio, 1491, Gallerie dell'Accademia, Venice

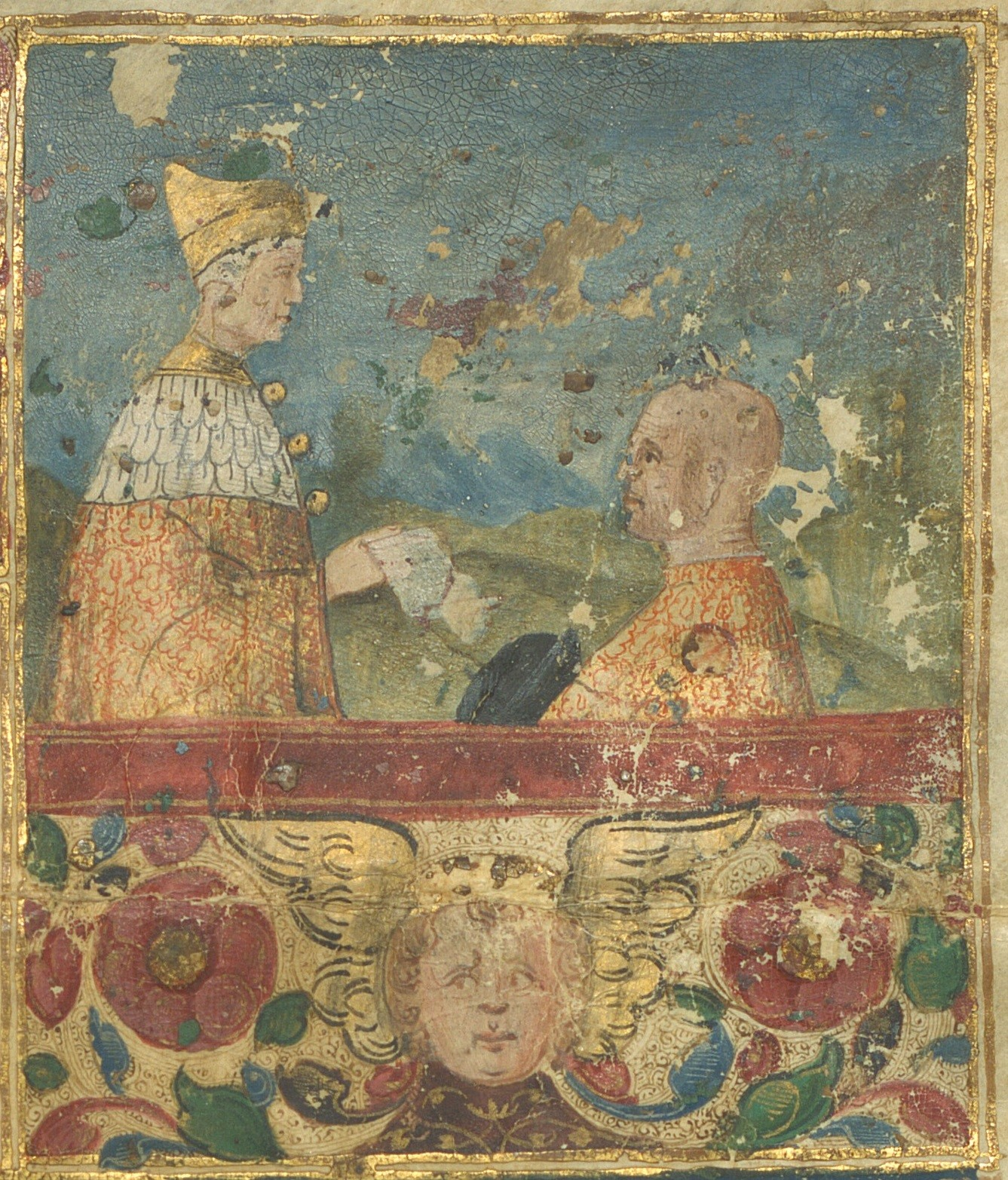
Doge Leonardo Loredan Handing a Parchment to Zauli Naldi, 1504, Manfrediana Library, Faenza

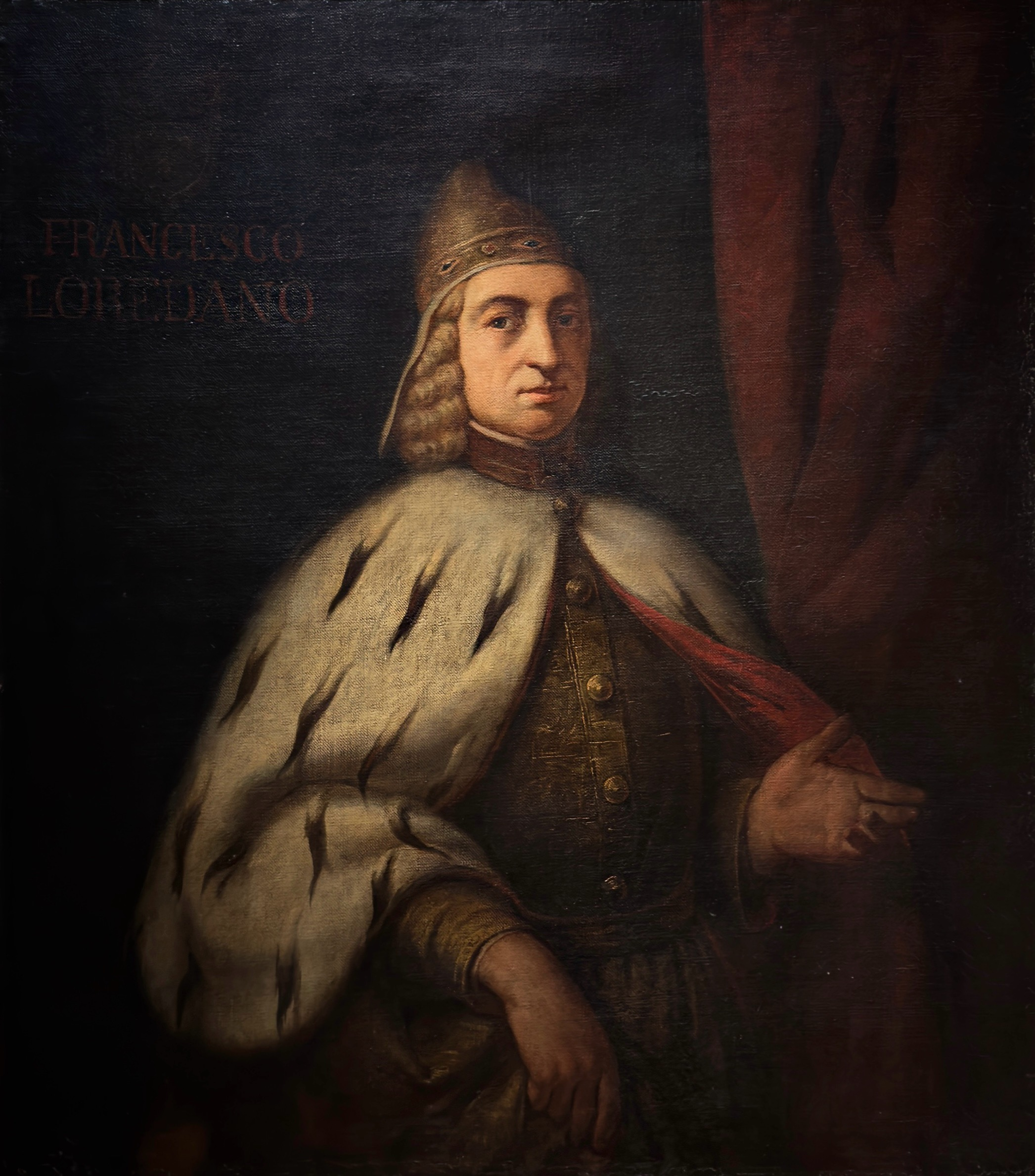
Portrait of Francesco Loredan, today displayed in the Ducal Apartments at the Doge's Palace, Venice

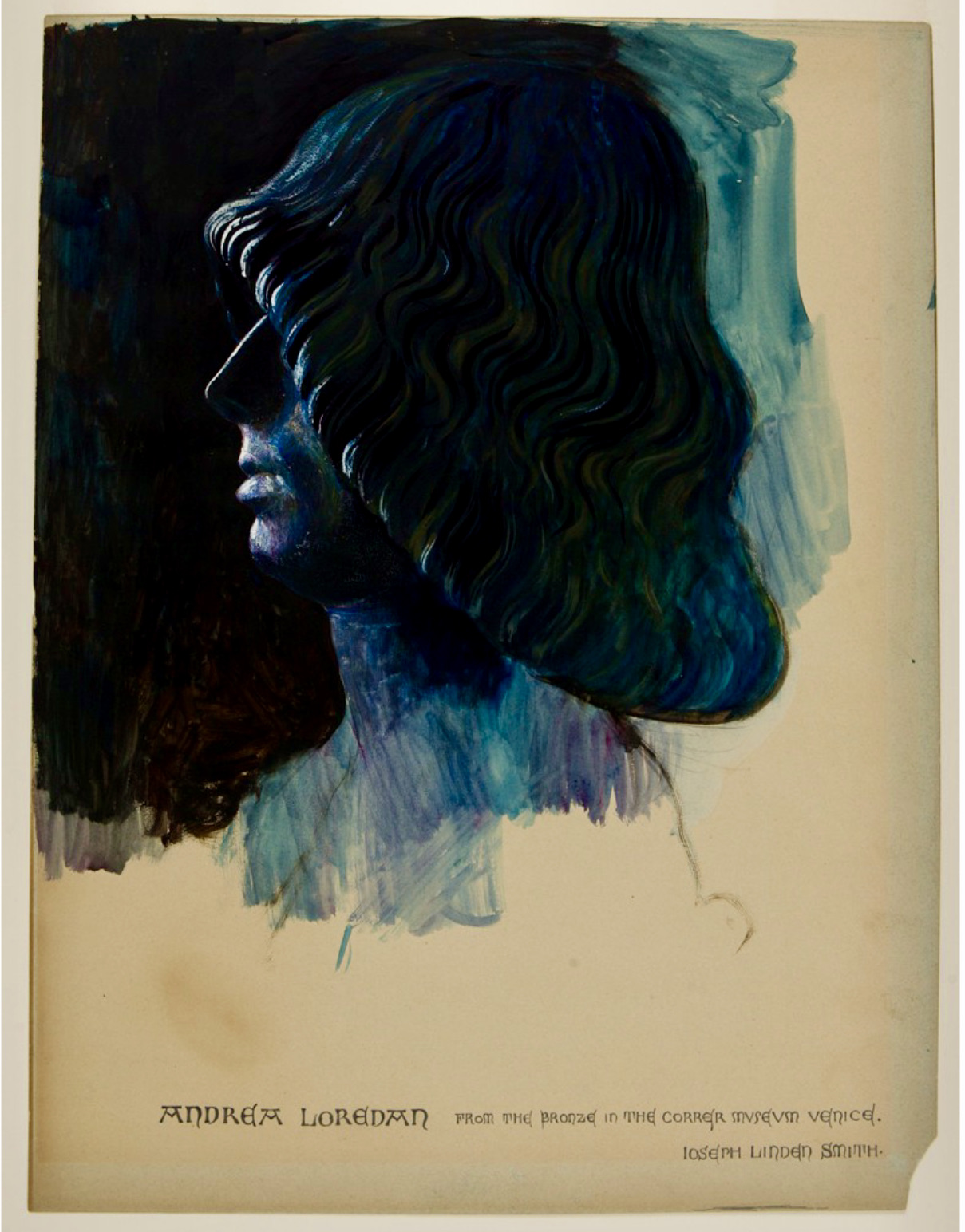
Side portrait of Andrea Loredan, by Joseph Lindon Smith, Harvard Art Museums, after Antonio Rizzo's 15th-century Bust of Andrea Loredan

==== Patronage ====
Immortalised in painting by numerous renowned artists, Leonardo Loredan is one of the most easily distinguishable figures of the Italian Renaissance. Nevertheless, little is known about his patronage of the arts during this crucial era in art history. Furthermore, there still remains much to be explored regarding the wide range of artistic endeavours carried out for the Doge's extended family, many of which overlapped with those under Leonardo's direction. This is especially the case for Andrea Loredan, a cousin of Leonardo, and one of the most prominent art collectors of the time. It is certain, however, that Loredan patronage, which included both the public and the private, the official, religious, and dynastic, was a massive, intricately connected undertaking that adorned numerous sites throughout Venice and involved nearly every significant artist active in the city during this period.

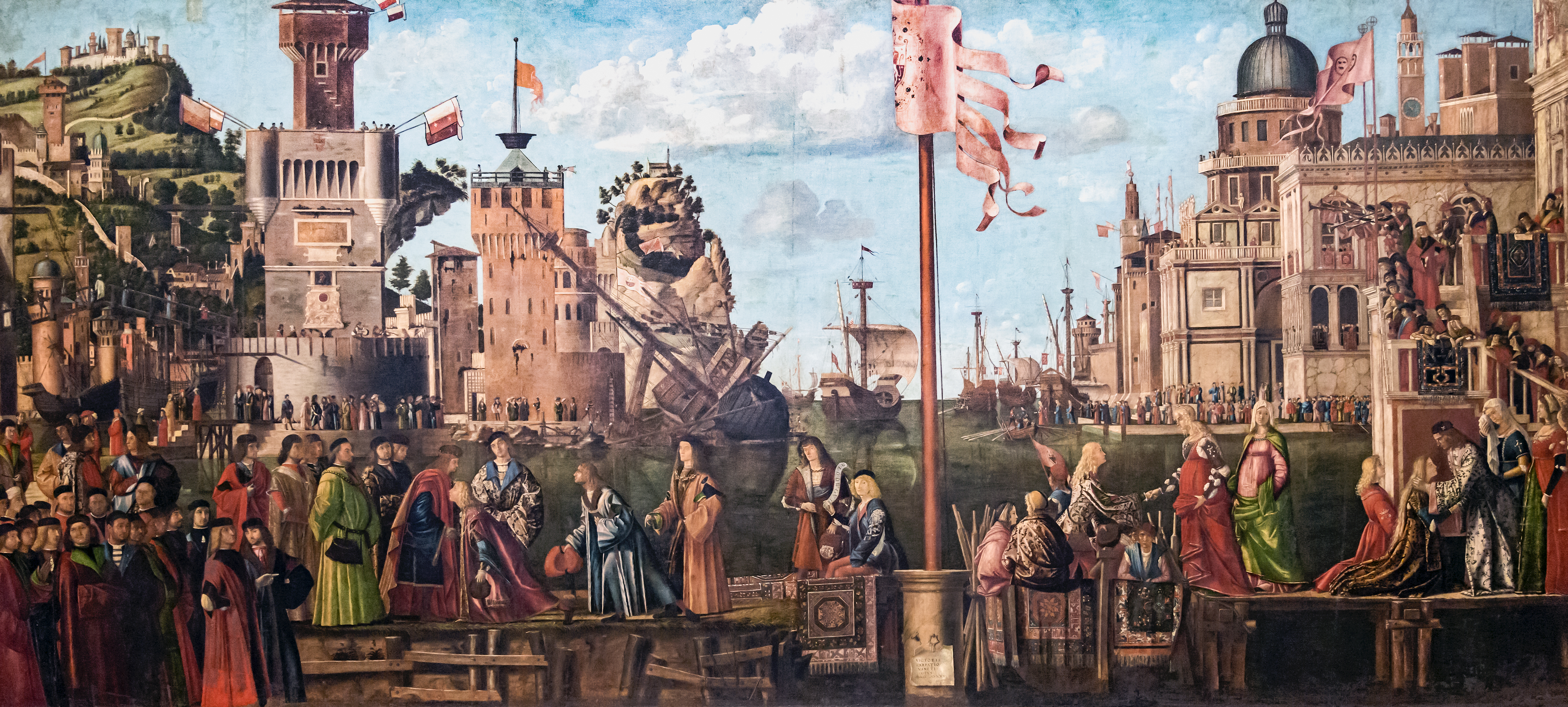
The Meeting of Ursula and the Prince, by Vittore Carpaccio, 1497, Gallerie dell'Accademia. In the middle, sitting on a parapet, is Antonio Loredan, member of the Compagnia della Calza and commissioner of the work.

Among the most famous works of art commissioned by the family is the Legend of Saint Ursula, a series of large wall-paintings on canvas by the Venetian Renaissance master Vittore Carpaccio. Originally created for the School of Saint Ursula, which was under the family's patronage, the paintings are now on display at the Gallerie dell'Accademia in Venice. The series was commissioned by Antonio Loredan, who is depicted in several of the paintings, although these paintings were created well after his death.

The family was also among the first to discover the talents of Titian, Giorgione, and Sebastiano del Piombo. Titian's first masterpiece, The Flight into Egypt, which he painted aged only 18, was commissioned by Andrea Loredan, and was intended for the portico of Andrea's newly constructed palace on the Grand Canal, now known as the Ca' Loredan Vendramin Calergi. Likewise, Sebastiano del Piombo's early painting The Judgement of Solomon was commissioned around the same time, also for the purpose of adorning the new Loredan palace.

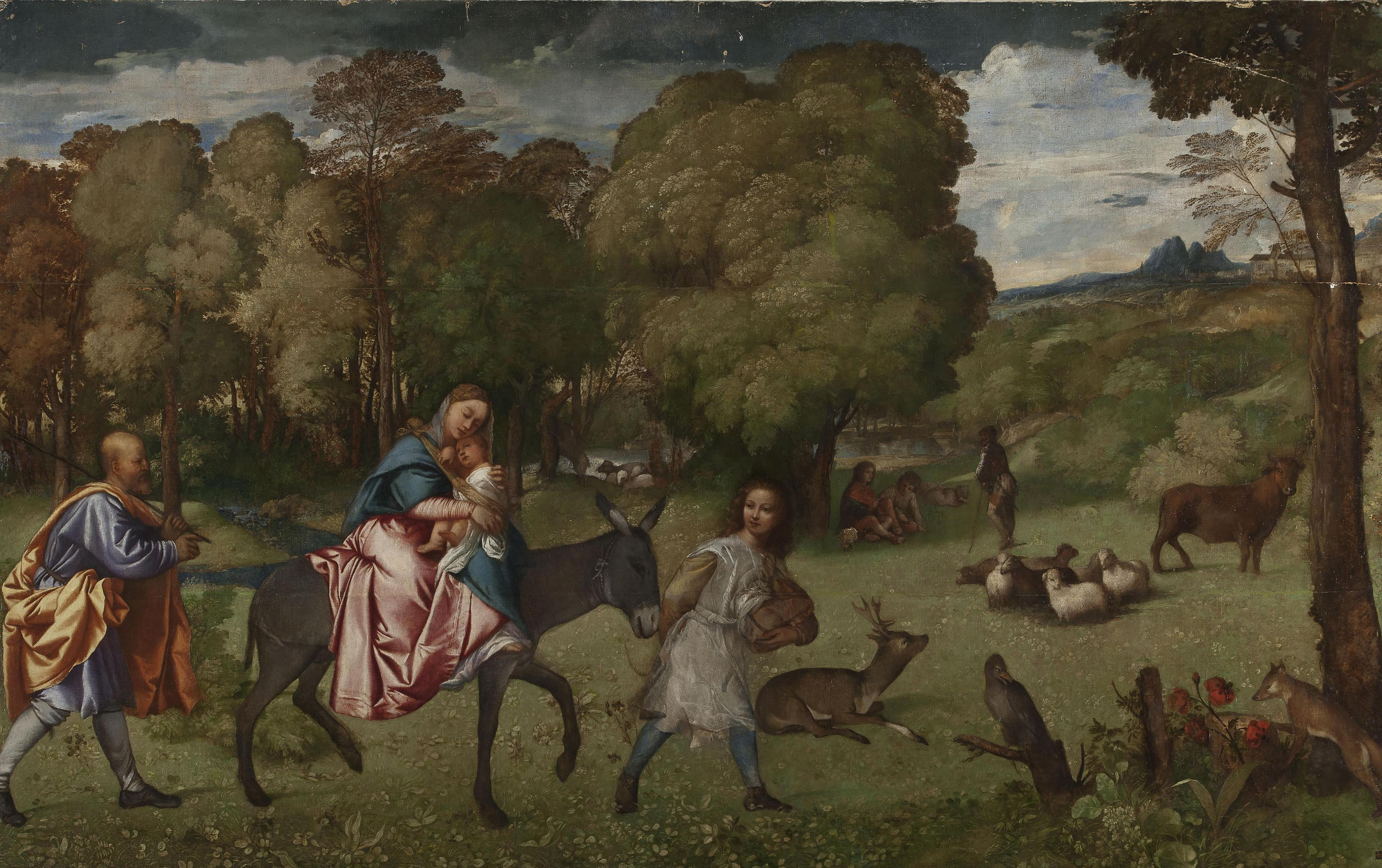
The Flight into Egypt, by Titian, 1508, The State Hermitage Museum, Saint Petersburg

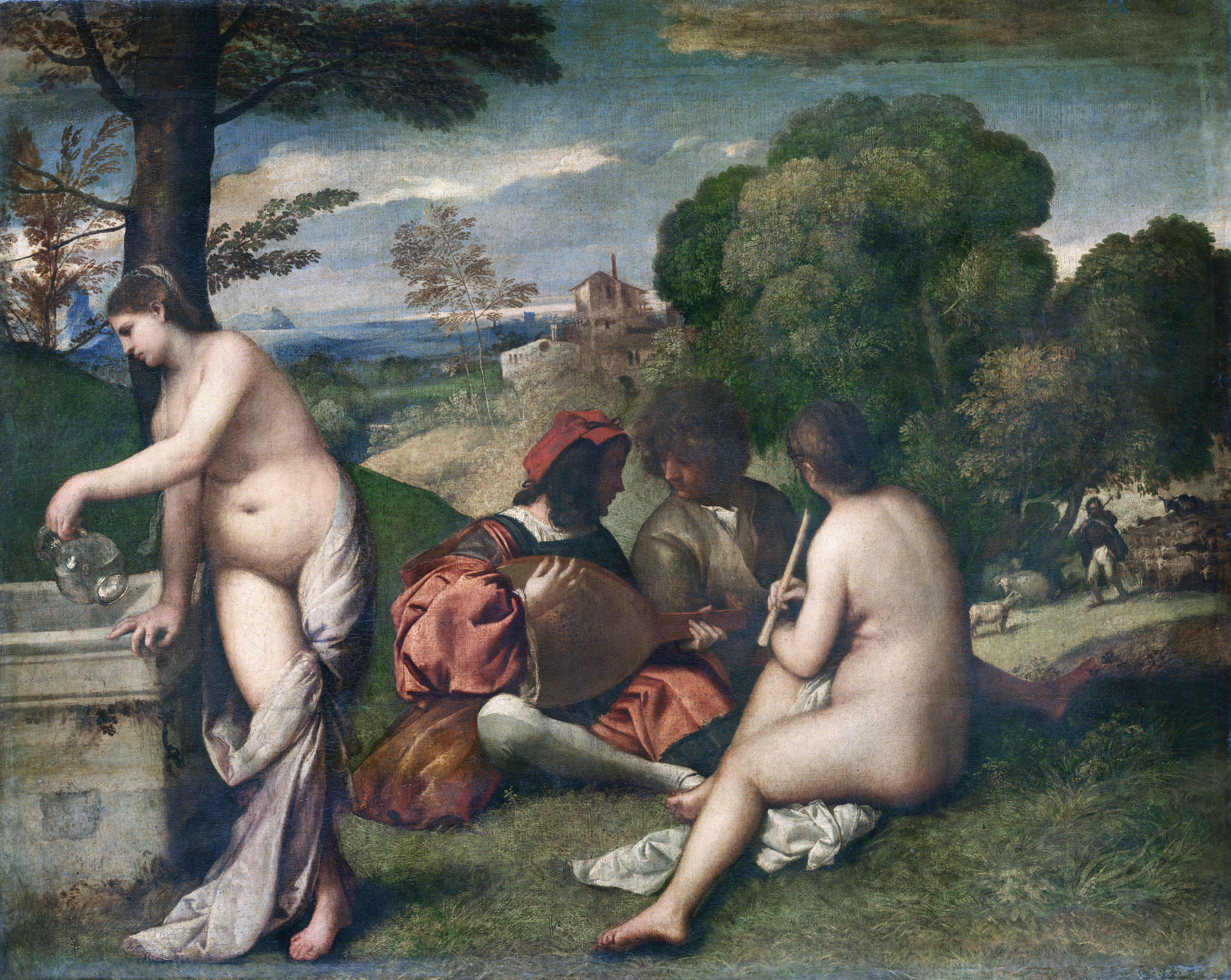
Pastoral Concert, by Titian or Giorgione, 1509, Musée du Louvre, Paris

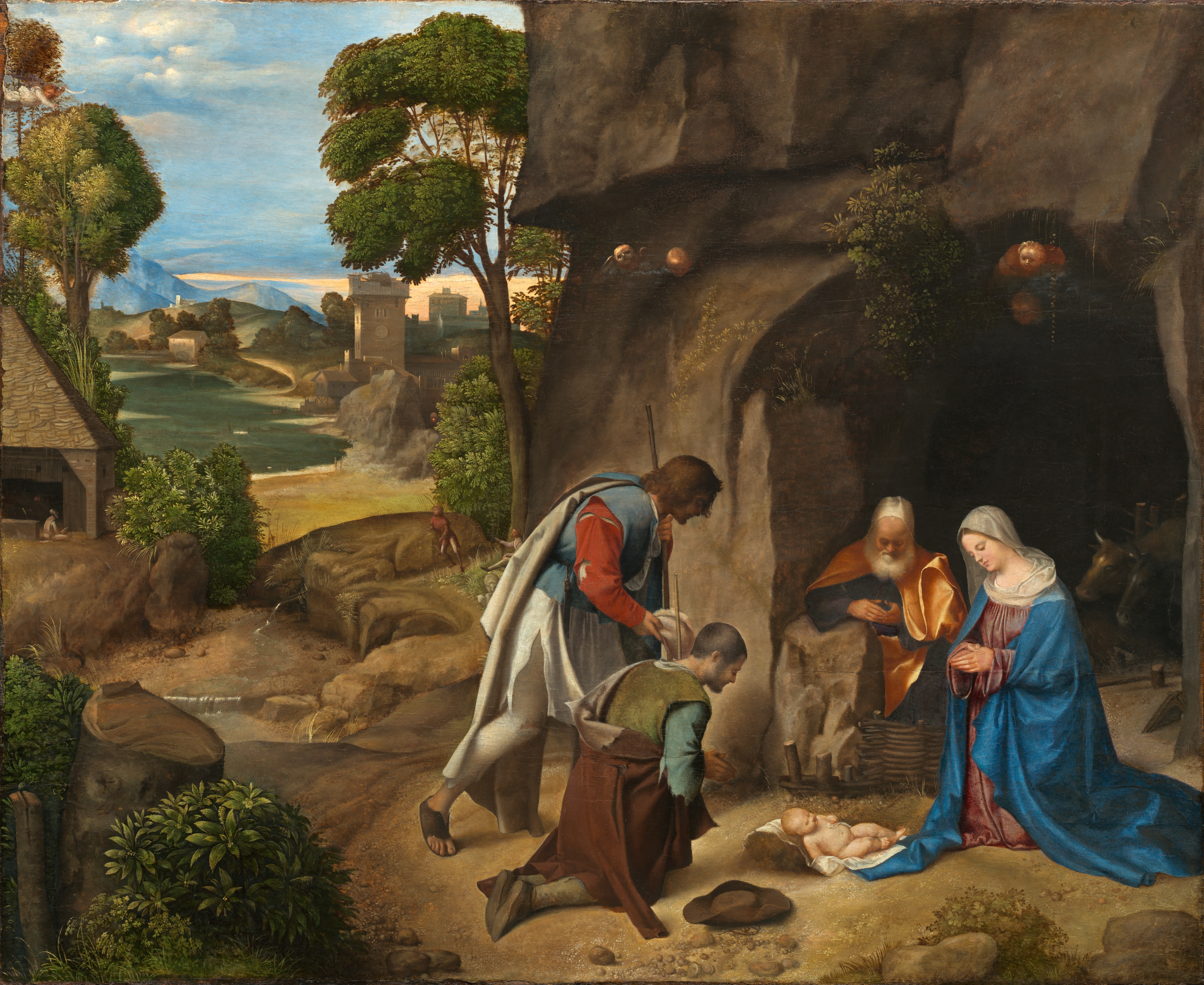
Adoration of the Shepherds, by Giorgione, c. 1505–1510, National Gallery of Art, Washington, D.C.

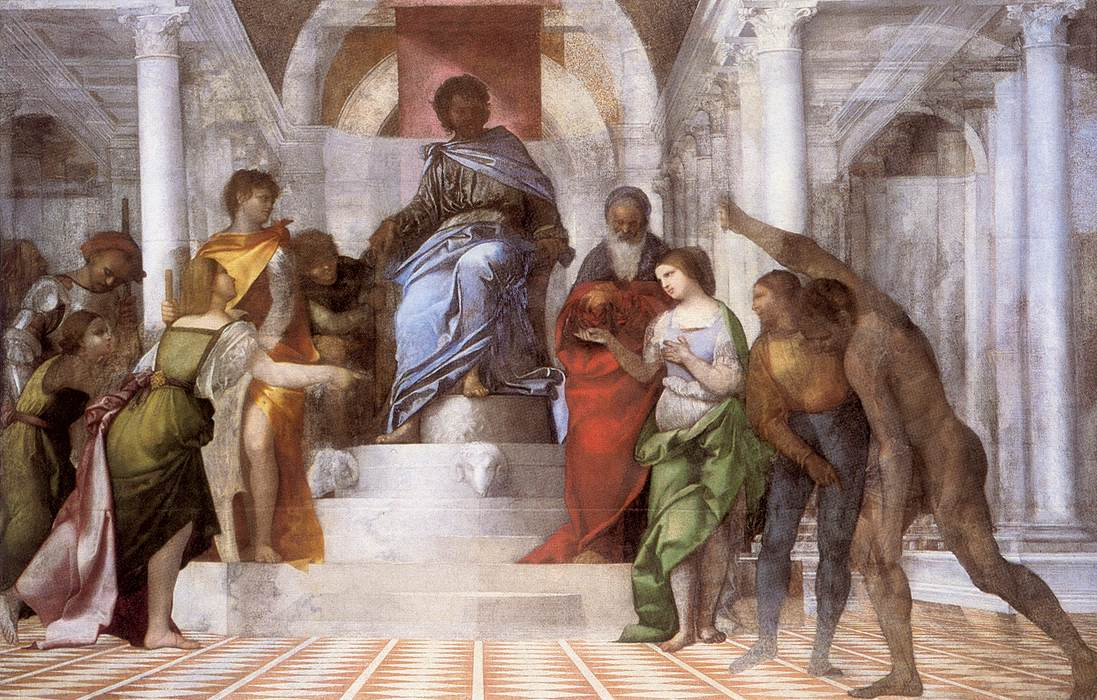
The Judgement of Solomon, by Sebastiano del Piombo, c. 1505–1510, Kingston Lacy (National Trust), Dorset

=== Impact on Venetian and Dalmatian cityscapes ===
==== Venice and the Veneto ====
Leonardo Loredan's dogeship (1501–1521) left a lasting imprint on Venice's urban fabric, especially through reconstruction and embellishment of key civic, commercial, and ceremonial spaces.

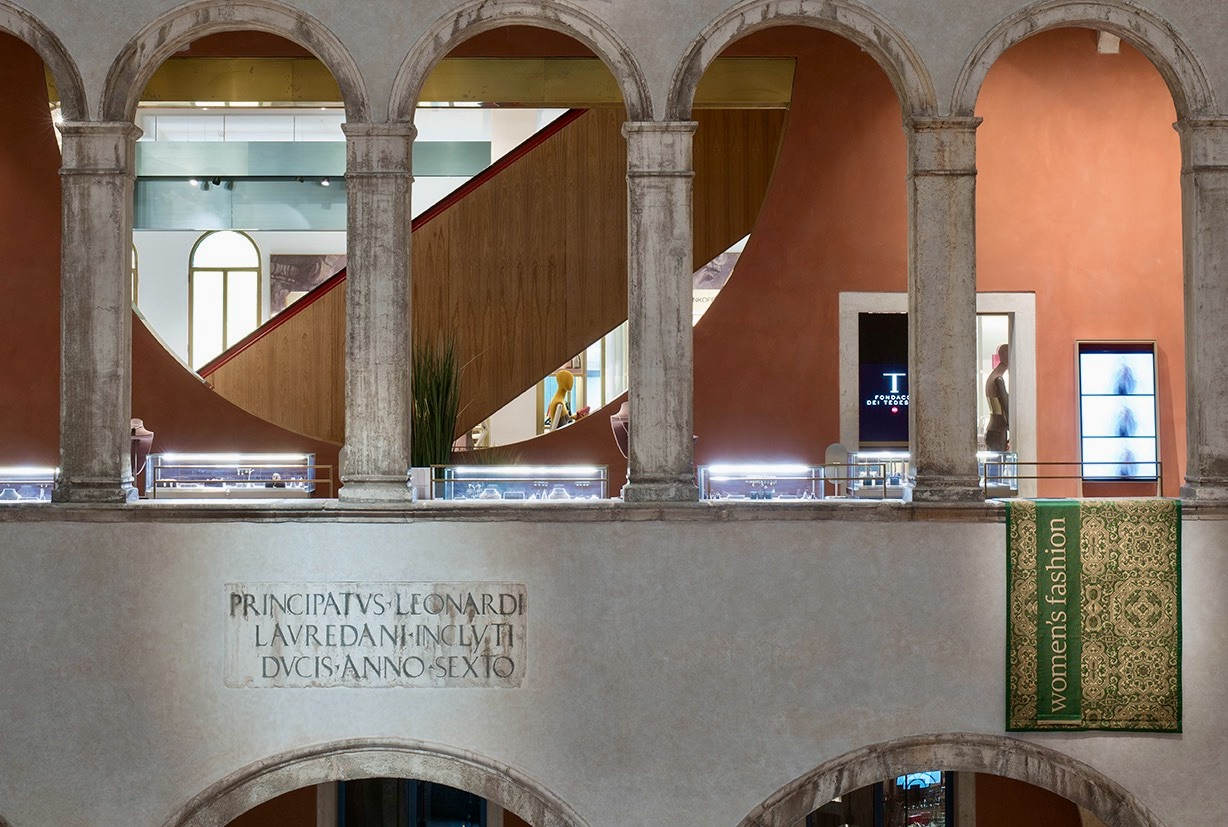
Latin inscription in the atrium of the Fondaco dei Tedeschi, translated as: 'In the sixth year of the reign of the illustrious prince Leonardo Loredan'.

Following major fires in 1505 and 1514 that devastated Rialto, the heart of Venice's mercantile district, Doge Loredan spearheaded a comprehensive urban renewal. He oversaw the reconstruction of the Fondaco dei Tedeschi, the centralised warehouse and bank for German merchants, designed by Antonio Scarpagnino and Giorgio Spavento, with a façade frescoed by Giorgione. He commissioned ancillary commercial buildings, such as the Palazzo dei Dieci Savi, surrounding the San Giacomo di Rialto square. He backed an early phase of rebuilding the wooden Rialto Bridge (in 1502, by Giorgio Spavento), and considered proposals for a later stone version. These interventions reshaped Rialto into a renewed economic hub and improved trade infrastructure, laying foundations for its later grandeur.

In the political and ceremonial centre around Saint Mark's Square, Loredan advanced key architectural projects, which included the transformation and decoration of the Cappella Zen inside St. Mark's Basilica, executed by Antonio Lombardo circa 1504–1521, the erection of the three monumental bronze flagstaffs in front of the basilica, crafted by Alessandro Lombardi in 1505, enhancing the piazza's ceremonial grandeur, and the initiation of the reconstruction of the Procuratie Vecchie, the long row of state buildings flanking the square; work on these began in 1517 under Loredan's auspices. These projects elevated the dignity of Venice's public image and reinforced the visual coherence of its central piazza.

Furthermore, Leonardo financed and supported major buildings belonging privately to the Loredan family, most notably the Ca' Loredan Vendramin Calergi, built in the late 15th century for Andrea Loredan but funded by Leonardo, and which remains one of Venice's architectural jewels on the Grand Canal and today houses the Wagner Museum and the Casinò di Venezia. These private projects contributed to Venice's evolving stylistic transition from Gothic to Renaissance.

The Doge also commissioned restoration of city walls and gates in the Republic's mainland territories (the Terraferma), engaging engineer Giovanni Giocondo from 1508 onward—an effort critical for defence during and after the War of the League of Cambrai. This work extended his influence beyond Venice into the mainland, reinforcing the republic's structural resilience.

==== Dalmatia ====
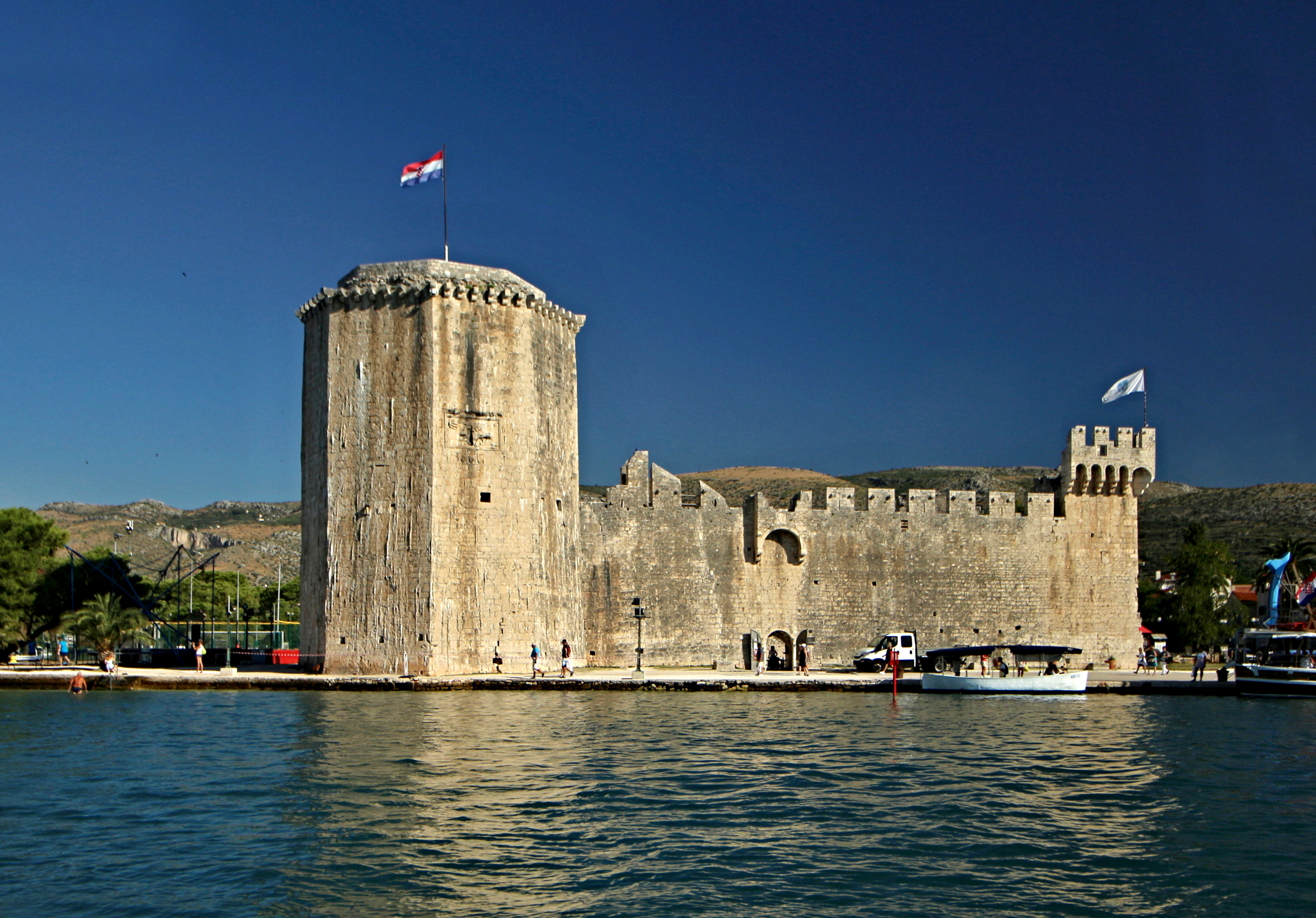
The monumental Camerlengo Castle in Trogir, built between 1420 and 1437

Following the conquest of Trogir in the 1410s, Venice ordered the construction of a citadel to assert control over the island town. Pietro Loredan, the first governor-general of Venetian Dalmatia, was specifically charged with finding the optimal site, advising against a crowded eastern harbourfront in favour of a southwest location for better access and visibility. The resulting trapezoidal fortress included a polygonal main tower with smaller square towers on three corners, and an internal chapel and stairway. The completed fortress would come to be known as the Camerlengo Castle. A Lion of Saint Mark, along with the coats of arms of the Loredan and Contarini families, as well as that of Doge Francesco Foscari, was carved near the main gate as a powerful symbol of Venetian sovereignty. The citadel dramatically transformed Trogir's urban landscape—physically separating the fortress from the old town and embedding Venetian power in stone. Parts of the structure survive today as a historic landmark.

Pietro Loredan was also instrumental in setting out the plans for the enhancement of the defensive walls of Zadar, the capital of Venetian Dalmatia. The city subsequently became the largest fortified city in the region, with battlements, moats, and strategic gates like the Land Gate, which patterned later works such as Verona's San Zeno Gate. The fortifications of Zadar are today a UNESCO World Heritage Site.

=== Impact on regional folklore ===
==== Race of the Ring ====
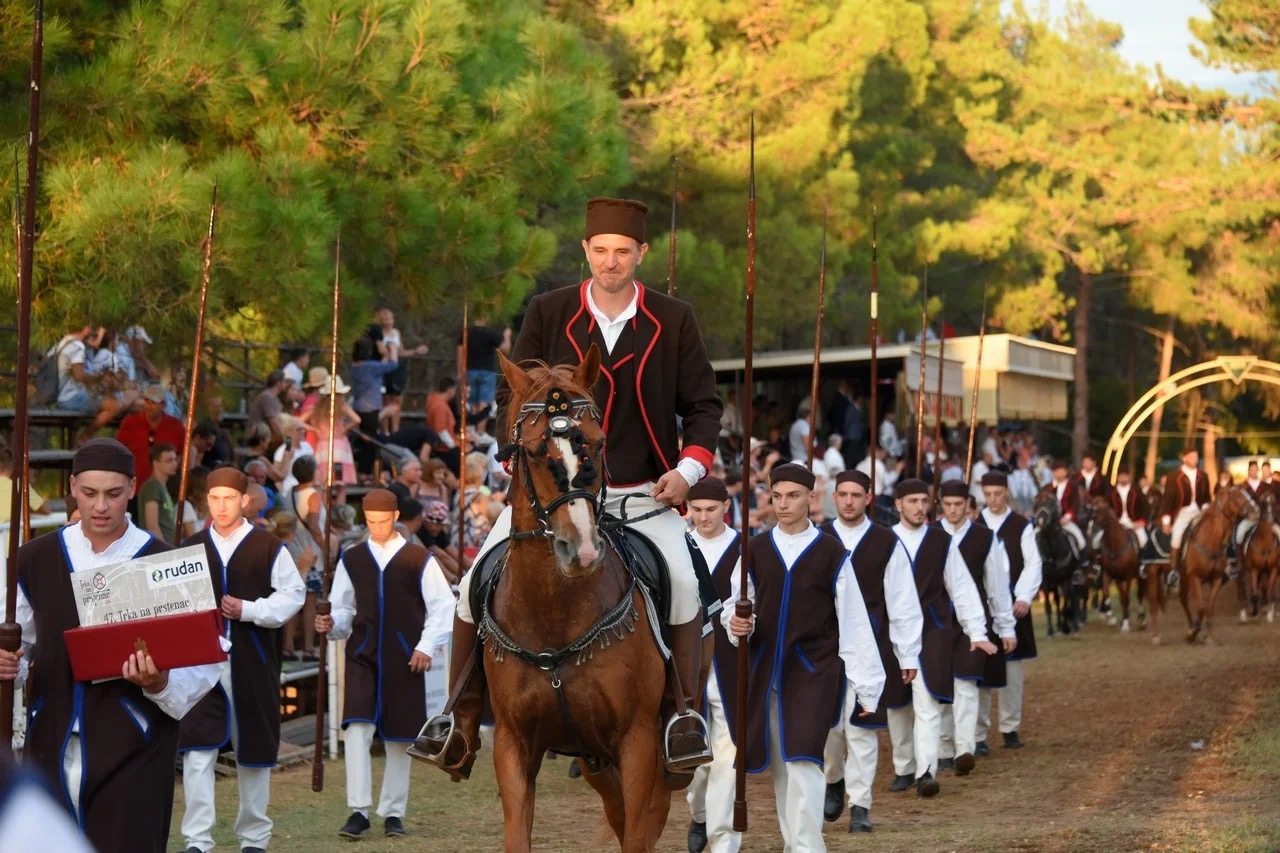
One of the knights in the Race of the Ring, 2022

The Race of the Ring (Croatian: Trka na Prstenac) is a traditional equestrian competition held every August in the town of Barban, in Istria, Croatia, one of the former Loredan estates. It dates back to the 17th century, when, during the local fair on Pentecost, 10 June 1696, Francesco Loredan, the feudal lord of Barban, organised a knightly competition in ring shooting. It is believed the competition was instituted in order to reinforce chivalric values, encourage loyalty to Venice, and promote public entertainment. At the time, the race continued to be organised annually under the patronage of the Loredan lords, and may have been inspired by similar tournaments in Venice or in Dalmatian cities. The competition also served as a form of military training and local celebration of feudal loyalty to the Loredans.

The race, modelled on medieval knightly tournaments, still continues today. Horsemen in traditional folk costumes gallop at full speed toward a metal ring (the prstenac), suspended on a wire, and attempt to pierce its center with a spear. The ring is divided into sections with different point values, and the goal is to score the most points in three attempts. The event is a major cultural festival, accompanied by parades, folk dancing, music, local crafts, and traditional food. It remains one of the most important manifestations of Istrian identity and heritage. In 2024, it was attended by the President of Croatia.

=== In popular culture ===
Francesco Loredan was portrayed by Tim McInnerny (as 'The Doge') in the 2005 American romance film Casanova, loosely based on the life of the famous adventurer and author Giacomo Casanova (portrayed by Heath Ledger), who was imprisoned in the Piombi under Loredan's government in 1755 for affront to religion and common decency.

Leonardo Loredan appeared as one of the characters in the 2009 action-adventure video game Assassin's Creed II. Set at the height of the Italian Renaissance, the game also features other historical figures of the time, including Leonardo da Vinci, Niccolò Machiavelli, Caterina Sforza, Bartolomeo d'Alviano, the Medici family, the Pazzi family, the Barbarigo family, and Pope Alexander VI.

=== MV Loredan ===
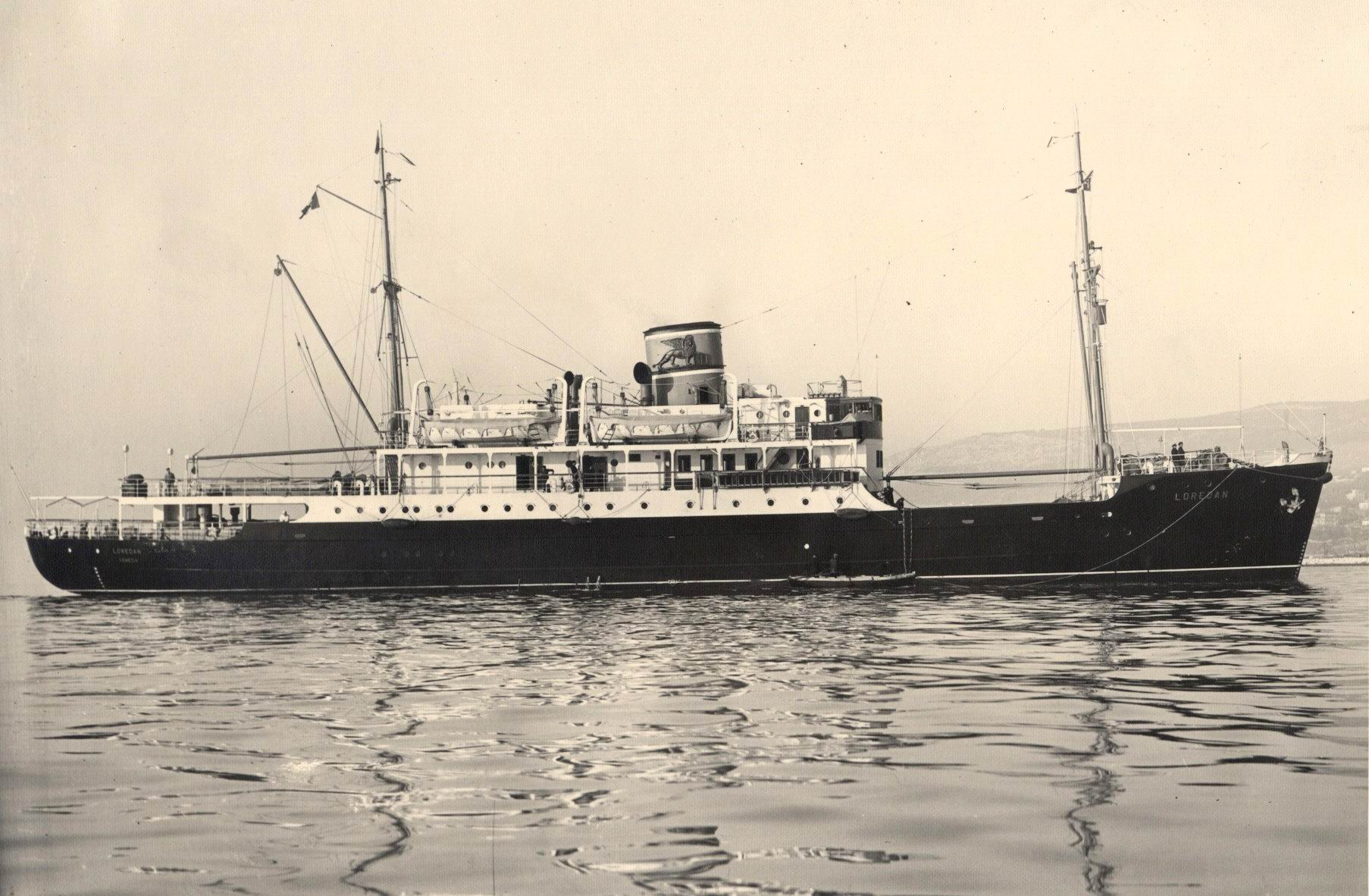
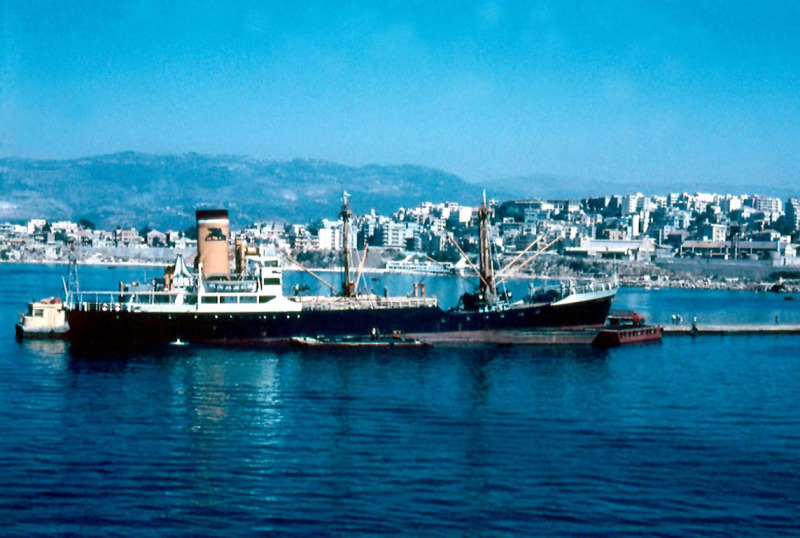
The old and the new Loredan ships. The latter is photographed off the coast of Beirut, Lebanon. The winged Lion of St. Mark is visible on the funnel of both ships.

The MV Loredan was an Italian mixed motor ship and auxiliary cruiser of the Italian Royal Navy in World War II, named in honour of the many admirals of the Loredan family.

Built in 1936 in Monfalcone, it initially served as a civil transport ship on several lines in the Adriatic Sea. In 1941 it was registered as an auxiliary cruiser in the Italian Royal Navy. In twenty-one months of service, it carried out a total of 193 missions, consisting mainly of escort services in the Tyrrhenian Sea.

On 10 April 1943, it left the port of Cagliari as an escort to a small convoy headed for the archipelago of La Maddalena. Shortly after the departure, the convoy was spotted by the British submarine HMS Safari, which proceeded to launch torpedoes at the Italian ships, sinking the Loredan with nearly all her crew.

The wreck of the Loredan lies on its left side, with the stern severely damaged, at a depth of between 52 and 67 meters, on the seabed of the Gulf of Cagliari, at 39°08' N and 9°23' E. Today, she is a frequent diving destination.

A new Loredan cargo ship was subsequently built in 1946, and broken up in 1971.

== Curiosities ==
- The oldest known document mentioning the famous Venetian gondola is a ducal privilege in favour of the Loredans (Privilegium Laureti) dating from 1094: "Gondulam vero nullam nobis nisi libera voluntate vestra factura estis" ("But you will not build us a gondola unless of your own free will").
- In the 1290s, Zanetto and Zorzi Loredan were being sued by Christian merchants from Amalfi, presumably for involvement in piracy activities, as they had seized a vessel off the coast of Malta.
- In 1316, Zanotto Loredan was seriously ill, so much so that it was thought he was dead, so the people took him to the church of San Matteo in Murano for burial. After the funeral rite, they wanted to deposit the body in the tomb, when someone noticed that the color of his face had changed. They took him to the convent hospital, warmed him and he recovered. Later he continued to live normally, married and had children.

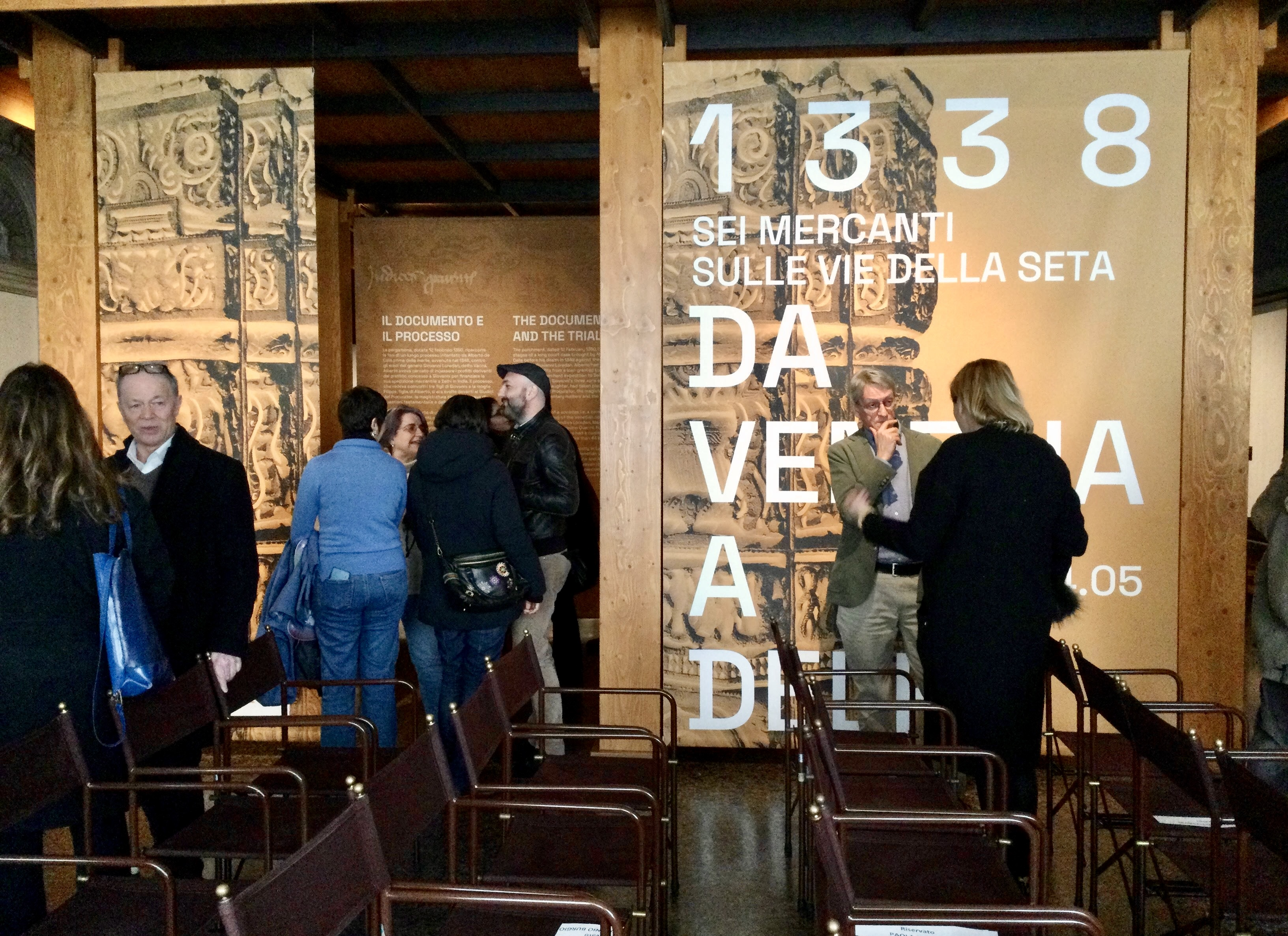
Photo from the 2025 exhibition "From Venice to Delhi: Six Merchants on the Silk Roads" at Ca' Pesaro, dedicated to the Voyage of the Loredan Brothers.

- In 1338, Giovanni Loredan and his brother Paolo joined four other Venetian nobles in one of the most ambitious medieval commercial expeditions, setting out overland from Tana across Central Asia and the Hindu Kush to the court of the Sultan of Delhi. Hoping to impress the ruler, they carried mechanical marvels from Venice, including a clock and an ornamental fountain, together with valuable textiles and other merchandise. Although Giovanni died before reaching Delhi, the surviving merchants received lavish gifts from the Sultan, invested them in pearls, and returned to Venice with a considerable profit. The voyage later became the subject of a lawsuit brought by Giovanni's father-in-law, whose successful claim over the expedition's profits preserved one of the richest surviving records of medieval Venetian long-distance commerce. The Voyage of the Loredan Brothers is frequently cited by historians as one of the clearest examples of the emergence of a global economy in the fourteenth century, illustrating how Venetian merchants travelled thousands of kilometres beyond the Mediterranean to trade directly with Persia, Central Asia and India in the decades following the travels of Marco Polo.
- In 1410, Andrea Loredan, who was Count of Drivasto, robbed the city of all its money and disappeared with it. The Signoria condemned him in absentia soon after.
- In the 1412 Battle of Motta, Pietro Loredan helped the Venetian military score a decisive victory over Hungary, by cunningly burning the bridges surrounding the Venetian camp so that fleeing Venetian troops could not escape following an unexpected Hungarian assault. This calculated decision completely changed the fortunes of the Venetians, rallying them back into combat, and ultimately securing their victory. Following the battle, Pietro ordered the bombardment of Motta, forcing the Hungarians to surrender the city.
- In the 1416 Battle of Gallipoli, Pietro Loredan managed to lead the Venetian fleet to victory over the Ottomans while being wounded by an arrow below the eye and the nose, and by another that passed through his left hand, as well as several other arrows that struck him with lesser effect. Following the battle, he took 1,100 Ottoman soldiers as captives, with most of them being sold into slavery afterwards.
- In 1423, when Pietro Loredan lost the election for the dogeship to his fierce rival Francesco Foscari, two of Loredan's daughters, Maria and Marina, were deliberately married to Francesco Barbaro and Ermolao Donà respectively, both of them opponents of Foscari. Furthermore, when Foscari proposed a marriage between his own daughter and one of Loredan's sons, it was rejected.

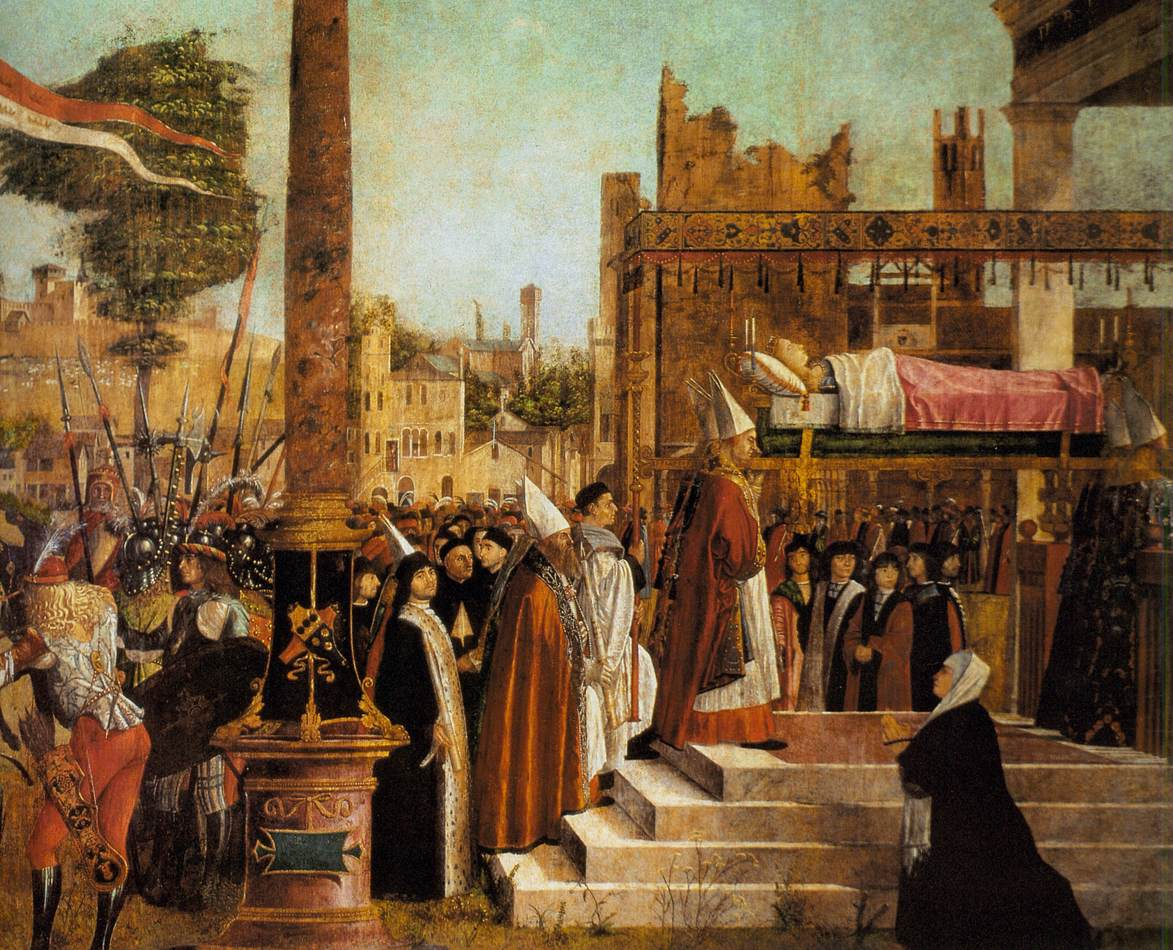
Martyrdom and Funeral of St. Ursula, by Vittore Carpaccio, 1497, Gallerie dell'Accademia, Venice. The kneeling figure is Madonna Maria Eugenia Caotorta Loredan, who died in 1493. The artist's signature and the date are found on a cartouche at the base of the column which bears the Loredan coat of arms crossed with another, perhaps that of the Caotorta family.

- Fabrizio Loredan, who was Count of Durazzo (Durrës) in the 1420s and known in contemporary records as Ser Fabricius de Durachio, was involved in illegal trade with the Ottoman Turks, purchasing horses at low prices and reselling them at considerable profit, despite restrictions on such commerce. The Venetian Senate had already punished him for his activities in 1425. By 1431, he had established an extensive commercial network centred in Cattaro (Kotor), whose citizens acted as his correspondents in Venetian Albania and in Dubrovnik in the Republic of Ragusa. Using ships hired at Cattaro, his agents represented Loredan interests in Durrës, Shkodër, Lezhë and Budva, while Fabrizio himself was involved in transporting grain from Albanian ports to Dalmatia and in more complex commercial ventures linking Albania, Dalmatia and the Italian states.
- In 1438, Pietro Loredan returned to Venice from a military campaign "molto agravato da mal", and died two days later, on 28 October. The inscription on his tomb at the Monastery of Saint Helena claimed that he was poisoned by unknown enemies ("per insidias hostium veneno sublatus"); popular legend ascribed the deed to Doge Francesco Foscari.
- In 1468, Marco Loredan acquired extensive properties and economic interests on the Venetian-held islands of Tinos and Mykonos. He had arrived to the islands as rector in the 1450s, and used an opportunity relating to the anti-Venetian Conspiracy of Stifos Vlastos to capture the outlaw Georgios Therianos on whom Venice had placed a bounty of 2,000 hyperpyra. Instead of collecting the cash, Marco Loredan requested a number of properties and economic privileges on the islands, choosing them so intelligently that he effectively established Loredan rule in Tinos and Mykonos that lasted until the early 16th century.
- For the construction of the monumental Ca' Loredan Vendramin Calergi in the late 15th century, Andrea Loredan spent an absurd sum of more than 200 thousand ducats, which equates to around 700 kilograms of pure gold. This amount of money represented something close to the budget of a princely court, a major state project, or the entire wealth of some of Europe's richest families at the time. Andrea was later decapitated in the 1513 Battle of La Motta, by two Spanish soldiers who fought over his severed head. His final will and testament is preserved, and deals with his intentions for the future of the palace and the vast art collection:

My said estate, after the death of my dear spouse, I wish to be the possession of Andrea Loredan of the above-named Alvise, on the condition that it pass from male heir to male heir ad infinitum. And I wish that it should never be possible to sell nor auction it [i.e. Ca' Loredan] ... I also want to say these words, that all the furnishings in the house may be sold, and turned into money, except its ornaments of paintings, tapestries, and marble statues, left at the discretion of my executors as decorations of the house, or better still the Republic.

— Andrea Loredan (1450 – 1513)
- In 1500, the Venetian Senate brought charges against Vincenzo Loredan and three other noblemen; they were accused of having repeatedly entered the Monastero delle Vergine at night to sleep with some of the nuns. These affairs went on for years without being discovered or acted upon.
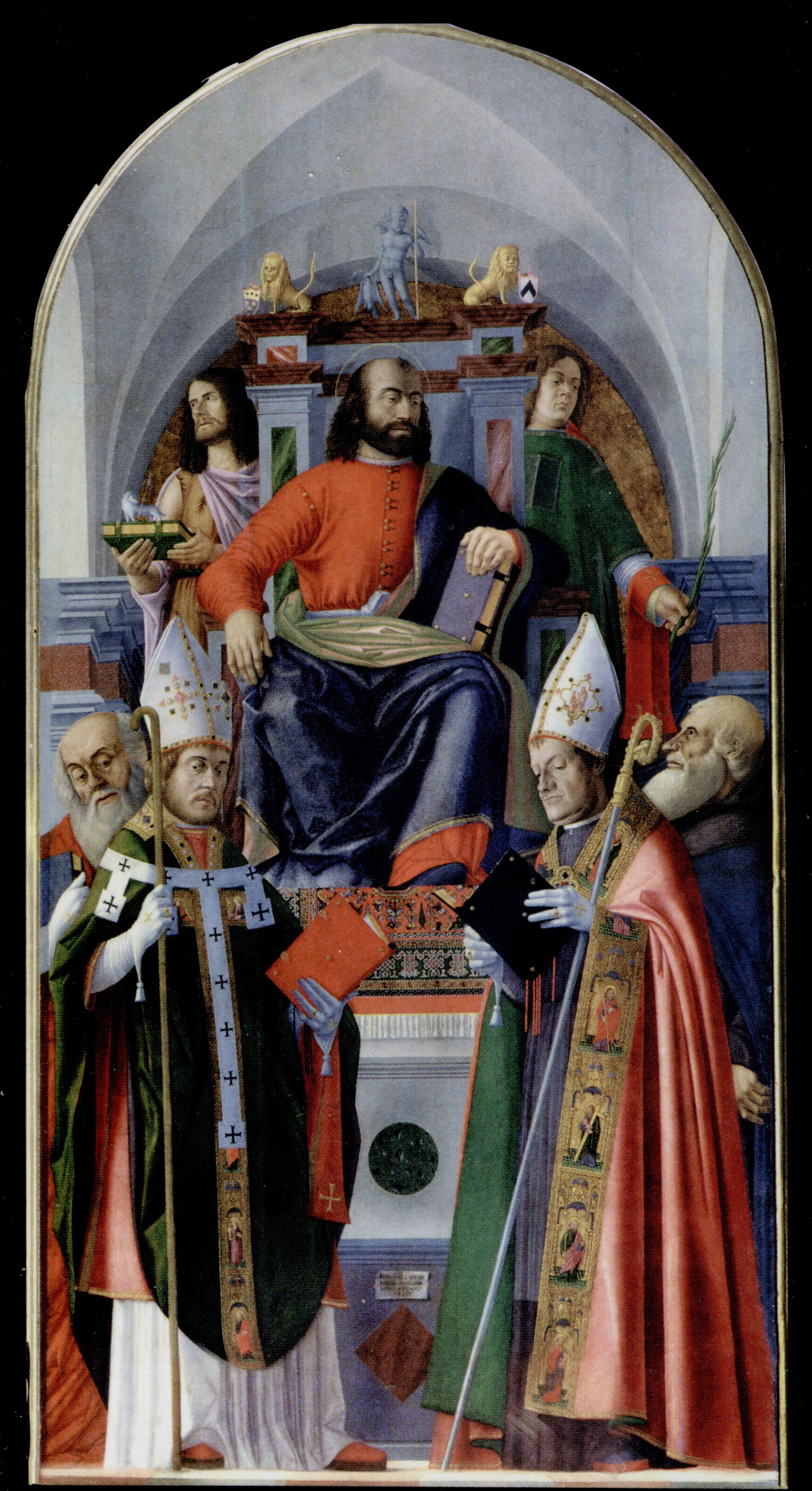
  St. Mark and Saints, by Giovanni Martini, 1501, Udine Cathedral. The facial features of the centrally positioned St. Mark the Evangelist were claimed to have been based on the face of Antonio Loredan, Duke of Friuli at the time.
- Giovanni Martini's 1501 altarpiece named St. Mark and Saints located at Udine Cathedral was highly criticised by the dean of the cathedral due to the peculiar aspect given to the face of Saint Mark. In a letter addressed to Domenico Grimani, Patriarch of Aquileia, the dean complained that the face of the saint suspiciously resembled that of Antonio Loredan, governor of Friuli. It is unknown whether Grimani responded to the dean or what he thought of the accusation, especially considering that Grimani's mother was the dogaressa Caterina Loredan.
- The election of Leonardo Loredan as doge in 1501 appears to have marked a revival of the tradition of panegyrical literature associated with Venetian doges, which had largely fallen into disuse during the fifteenth century. His accession prompted an outpouring of congratulatory and laudatory works by humanists from across the Venetian dominions, including the Divina electio ac tempestiva creatio serenissimi principis Veneti Leonardi Lauredani of the Dalmatian humanist Toma Niger and the Aegloga in creatione Leonardi Lauretani principis Veneti illustrissimi of the Zadar-born Jerolim Kršava. The most well-known of these panegyrical works is the 1503 Panegyricus Leonardo Lauredano by Sigismundus Burgus. The renewed production of such works placed Loredan at the centre of a revived humanist culture of praising the Venetian doge and helped establish his election as an important moment in the development of early sixteenth-century Venetian panegyrical literature.

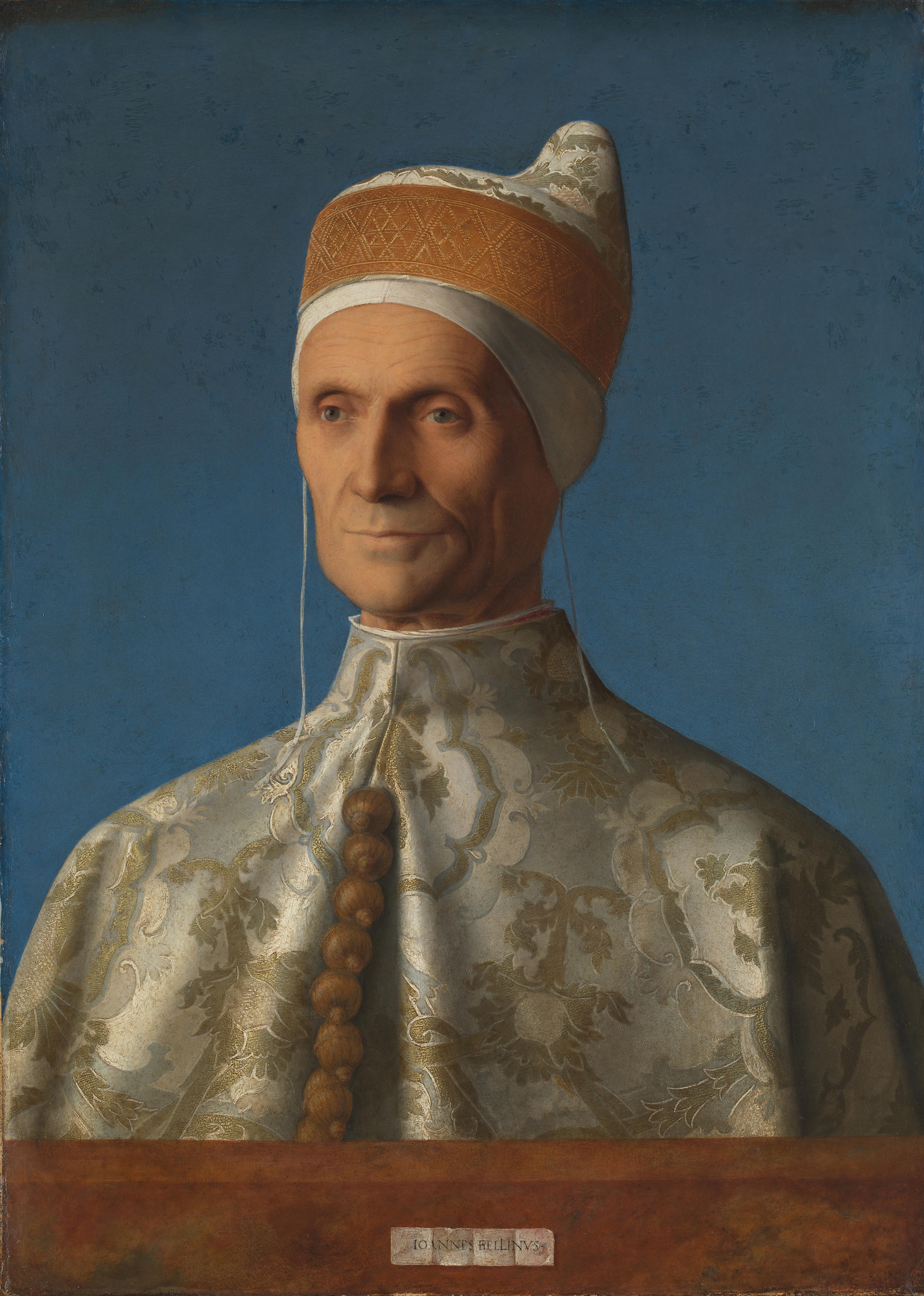
Portrait of Doge Leonardo Loredan (1501) by Giovanni Bellini, National Gallery, London

- Giovanni Bellini's 1501 Portrait of Doge Leonardo Loredan is significant as it was the first portrait of an Italian ruler to be painted face-front. Previously, face-front portraits were reserved for holy figures, while mortals would be portrayed in profile to signify their spiritual incompleteness.
- In 1506, Andrea Loredan’s reputation as an art collector brought him into correspondence with Isabella d’Este, Marchioness of Mantua, one of the great patrons and collectors of the Italian Renaissance. Isabella had become determined to acquire the Summersione di Farahone (Submersion of Pharaoh), a painting formerly belonging to the recently deceased Michele Vivianello. Loredan had purchased the work at auction for 115 ducats, and when Isabella offered to reimburse him with an additional profit, he instead agreed to part with it without profit—and went further, sending her a portrait or “head” of the painter and a group of porcelain vessels. In a letter dated 29 June 1506, Isabella thanked him for his “generosity of spirit,” confessing that she would not have dared to ask for the additional objects lest she deprive him of all his beautiful possessions. She promised to remain his debtor and to reciprocate his kindness whenever an opportunity arose, concluding that the treasures had arrived safely and were "no less beautiful than their fame."

Letter from Isabella d'Este, Marchioness of Mantua, to Andrea Loredan, dated 29 June 1506. Excerpt, in English: To the magnificent Andrea Loredan, Your Magnificence has shown no less generosity of spirit and loving disposition toward us than we had expected from you concerning our desire for the painting of the Submersion of Pharaoh, (...). For now we cannot repay you with anything other than the greatest thanks that it is possible for us to give, together with a firm promise that we will always be ready to show our gratitude to Your Magnificence whenever an occasion arises involving you or your friends. All the aforementioned things have now arrived, and they are no less beautiful than their reputation had led us to expect. We shall keep them among our treasures, out of affection for Your Magnificence.

- In 1506, Doge Leonardo Loredan had a remarkable encounter with the German Renaissance artist Albrecht Dürer, who was then residing in Venice during his second Italian journey. Loredan, accompanied by the Patriarch of Venice, Antonio Surian, and the celebrated Venetian painter Giovanni Bellini, visited Dürer in his studio to see his newly completed Feast of the Rose Garlands. Dürer was already an international artistic celebrity, whose prints had circulated throughout Europe, and the success of the Feast of the Rose Garlands further established his reputation in Venice; he proudly wrote to his friend Willibald Pirckheimer that he had silenced those who claimed that he was “good at engraving but did not know how to handle colours”, adding: “The Doge and the Patriarch have seen my picture.” The presence of Loredan, Surian and Bellini together with Dürer made the occasion an exceptional meeting of the highest political, ecclesiastical and artistic circles of Renaissance Venice. Modern scholarship has interpreted the encounter not merely as an artistic visit but as potentially having a political dimension, in the context of Venice's relations with the Holy Roman Empire and Emperor Maximilian I. One scholarly hypothesis further suggests that Loredan was sufficiently impressed by Dürer that he wished the celebrated German artist to remain in Venice and work for the Republic.
- During Leonardo Loredan's reign, in 1507, the events of the Fornaretto of Venice took place, the story of an innocent baker sentenced to death for an uncommitted murder. The popular tale found wide diffusion even outside Venice after the publication in 1846 of the historical drama in five acts by Francesco Dall'Ongaro, which recounts its events.
- At the height of the War of the League of Cambrai, and with Venice's resources diminishing, Doge Leonardo Loredan set a noble example by sending all of his gold and silver plates and the jewels of his late wife to the Mint to be melted down for money. In his speech before the Great Council, which was described as a model of patriotism and eloquence and greeted rapturously, he also invited other nobles to contribute as much money as possible in order to meet the enormous expenses of resistance.
- In the Latin inscription on the Tomb of Doge Leonardo Loredan, the year of his death is mistakenly written as MDXIX (1519) instead of MDXXI (1521).
- In 1536, Lucietta Loredan married Francesco Badoer. Two years later, Lucietta’s brother Zorzi Loredan died intestate (without a will). His vast inheritance was divided between his widow's two brothers and his two sisters' husbands. The division took a decade to resolve, but left Badoer in possession of 460 acres in the Polesine. In 1556, he and Lucietta hired Andrea Palladio to design for them a new house at Fratta, and construction of what would become the famous Villa Badoer began the following year. As one of the original Palladian villas of the Veneto, the mansion is today a UNESCO World Heritage Site. Two coats of arms remain frescoed above the entrance to the villa – those of the Badoer and Loredan families – symbolising the alliance between the two patrician houses.

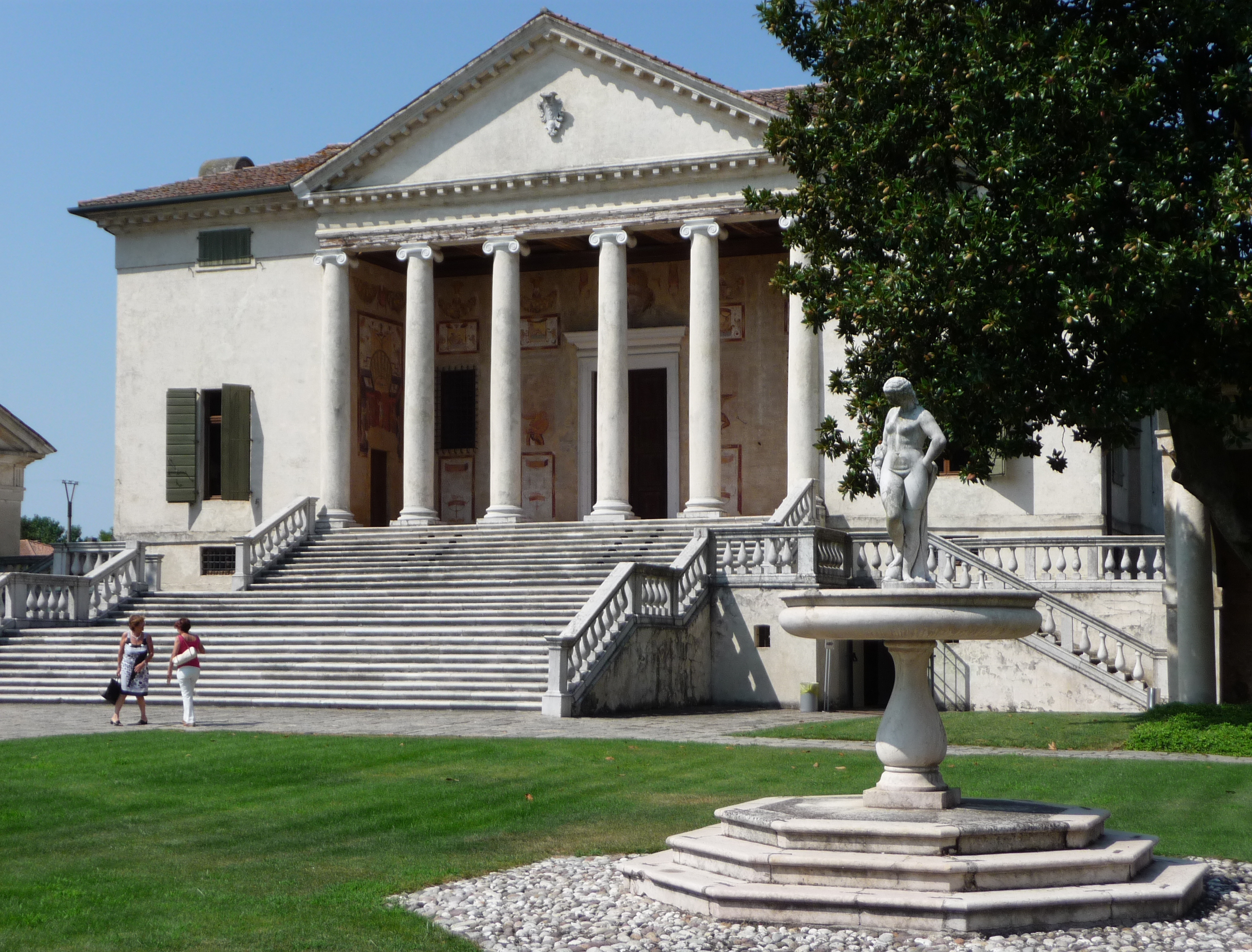
The Villa Badoer, designed in 1556 by Andrea Palladio at the commission of Francesco Badoer and Lucietta Loredan, on land which they inherited from Lucietta's brother Zorzi.

- In 1568, following lengthy negotiations with the heirs of Andrea Loredan, who had owned one of the largest private art collections in the world, Albert V of Bavaria finally purchased a substantial amount of the coveted collection: 120 bronzes, 2,480 medals and coins, 91 marble heads, 43 marble statues, 33 reliefs and 14 various curiosities, for the sum of 7,000 ducats; "they were all exported from Venice secretly at night in large chests". Most of the pieces are now displayed in the Antiquarium at Munich Residenz, built specifically to house the impressive collection.
- In 1570, at the death of Doge Pietro Loredan, who tried to tackle food shortages of 1569/1570 by introducing bread made of millet, and who was held personally responsible for the famine, the people of Venice were heard singing: "Rejoice, rejoice! The Doge is dead, who gave us millet in our bread!" and "Long live our saints and lords of noble birth, dead is the Doge who brought upon us dearth!"
- One theory about Doge Pietro Loredan's death is that, instead of being struck with illness, he died a peaceful death in his villa in east Italy. There he was being fed grapes by his servants, and while eating, his mistress tried to start a conversation with him, leading Loredan to choke and suffocate on his grape. They tried to get the grape dislodged from his throat but to no avail.
- In 1598, an incident occurred which resulted in an urban legend known as The Ghost of Fosco Loredan. In a burst of anger resulting from jealousy of his wife Elena who attracted many suitors, Fosco Loredan murdered her at Campiello del Remèr by decapitating her, and was then ordered by her uncle, Doge Marino Grimani, to walk to Rome while carrying her disfigured body on his back to ask for the Pope's forgiveness, as he was the only one who could grant it to a noble of the rank of Loredan. After hearing the story, Pope Clement VIII did not want to see him, and, out of desperation, Fosco went back to Venice and drowned himself in the Grand Canal. Supposedly, on the anniversary of his wife's killing, his ghost can be seen wandering the streets of Venice at night searching for peace.
- Dogaressa Paolina Loredan made a decision never to appear in any public ceremonials out of fears that she would be mocked by the populace due to her being an immensely stout and unusually plain-looking woman. She brought an enormous dowry of 26,000 ducats into her marriage with Carlo Contarini, which enabled him to finance his extremely lavish embassy trips and contributed significantly to his election as Doge. Following their deaths, the portrait busts of Paolina and her husband were moved to the façade of the Church of San Vidal (albeit without mentioning their names), which violated the otherwise strict prohibition against self-glorification of the Doges in public spaces outside of churches and private spaces. After 1859, the couple's human remains were lost in the course of secularisation and reconstruction.
- In 1675, near the Palazzo Contarini-Sceriman and the nearby bridge, Leonardo Loredan was found dead in a boat. The unexplained death was the source of many rumors, claiming accidental death, murder by relatives, or murder by the Inquisitors of the Republic.
- The famous 1716 oratorio Juditha triumphans by Antonio Vivaldi was likely commissioned by Antonio Loredan (1666 – 1748), a noted music patron, in order to celebrate the successful Venetian defence of Corfu against the Ottoman siege in the summer of 1716, in which he, as Captain General of the Sea, played a decisive role.
- Despite the incredible amount of money Francesco Loredan spent on celebrations upon his ascension to the dogeship in 1752, one of the sonnets composed for the occasion complained of insufficient results, mocking the music and claiming that the "machine" of fireworks had funerary references.
- In 1771, a fourteen-year-old Wolfgang Amadeus Mozart and his father Leopold were in Venice during their first Italian journey. In March of that year, they were received at Palazzo Loredan dell’Ambasciatore on the Grand Canal. The palace had a functioning private theatre, and a concert was played by the young prodigy for a select group of guests. Contemporary and biographical accounts describe the visit as a formal reception, which had the intention of introducing young Mozart to Venetian intellectual and musical circles.

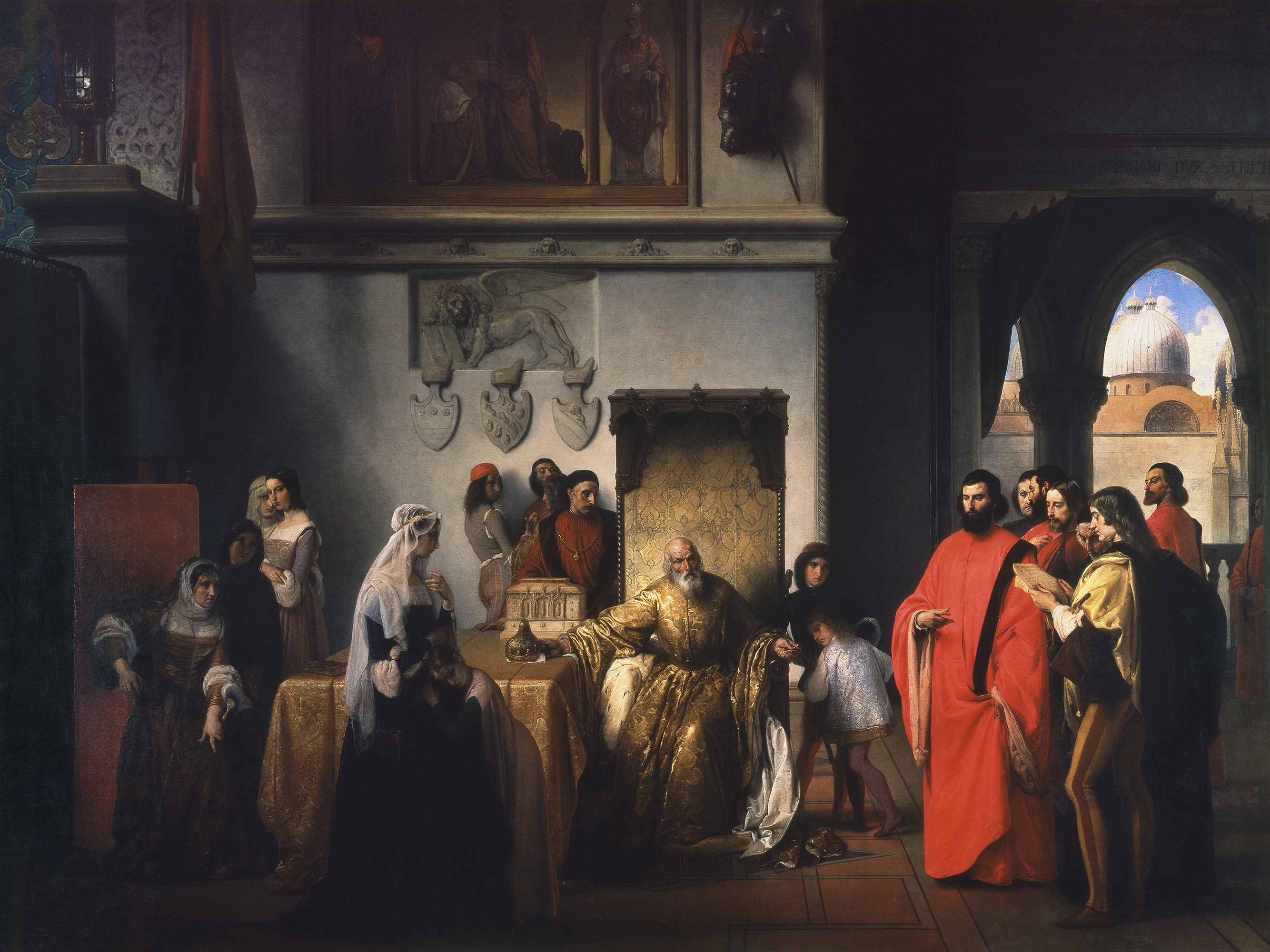
The Council of Ten pronouncing the decree for the abdication of Doge Francesco Foscari, as depicted in Doge Francesco Foscari's Removal, by Francesco Hayez, 1844, Pinacoteca di Brera, Milan. The bearded man in scarlet regalia is Giacomo Loredan, the driving force behind Foscari's downfall.

- In his 1821 play The Two Foscari, based on true events, Lord Byron presents Giacomo Loredan as the chief human engine of the tragedy, prosecuting Jacopo Foscari (son of Doge Francesco Foscari) with implacable severity in the Council of Ten out of an inherited vendetta against the Doge’s family, which Loredan coldly records in a ledger as a debt owed for the deaths of his father and uncle, explicitly entered as “Doge Foscari, my debtor for the deaths of Marco and Pietro Loredan, my sire and uncle.” He presses the torture despite Jacopo’s collapse, rejects all mitigating appeals, and insists on lifelong banishment to Crete, conceding only that Marina (Jacopo’s wife) may accompany her husband because he “wars not with women”, while ensuring their children remain wards of the state. Loredan personally confirms the sentence in Jacopo’s prison, clashes venomously with Marina, and stands as the silent object of her accusation when Jacopo dies suddenly before exile, his death implicitly attributed to Loredan by popular superstition. He then participates in the Council’s decision to depose the Doge himself, oversees the formal stripping of Francesco Foscari’s power, and is present at his death, untouched by pity or doubt; the play closes with Loredan calmly entering in his ledger the word “Paid”, reducing the destruction of both father and son to the final settlement of a hereditary account. Giuseppe Verdi’s 1844 opera I due Foscari is based on Byron’s play.
- The Loredans were one of the rare families in which feudal ownership of an estate could be inherited by a woman. The family's Istrian fief of Barban and Rakalj was the only feudal estate in Istria in which ownership could be passed down to a female heiress. This shows how the family was able to keep ownership of their Istrian lands until 1869, a century after the family branch of Santo Stefano, which had owned it, became extinct in the male line.
- The MV Loredan ship, built in 1936 and named in honour of the many Loredan admirals throughout history, was torpedoed by British submarine HMS Safari on 10 April 1943, 10 miles off the coast of Sardinia, while carrying cargo from Cagliari to the archipelago of La Maddalena, serving as part of the Italian Navy in the Second World War. The ship sunk immediately with nearly all her crew. The wreck of the Loredan lies on its left side, with the stern severely damaged, at a depth of between 52 and 67 meters, on the seabed of the Gulf of Cagliari, at 39°08' N and 9°23' E. Today, she is a frequent diving destination.
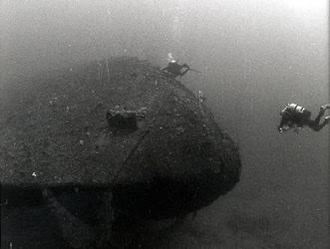
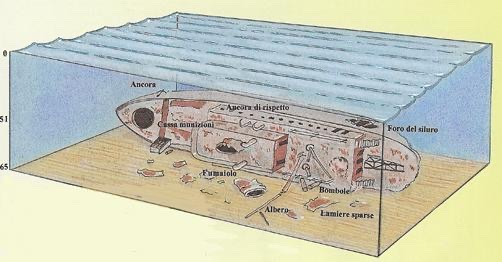
  Exploration of the Loredan shipwreck and an illustration depicting the ship lying on its left side
- Francesco Loredan was portrayed by Tim McInnerny in the 2005 romance film Casanova, loosely based on the life of the famous adventurer and author Giacomo Casanova.
- Leonardo Loredan appeared as one of the characters in the 2009 action-adventure video game Assassin's Creed II, alongside other historical figures of the Renaissance, including Leonardo da Vinci, Niccolò Machiavelli, Caterina Sforza, Bartolomeo d'Alviano, the Medici family, the Pazzi family, the Barbarigo family, and Pope Alexander VI.
- The feminine name Loredana, common in Italy and Romania, is derived from the name of the Loredan family. Notable people with the name include even the botanist and Dogaressa of Venice Loredana Marcello (1533–1572).

== Wineries ==
=== Conte Loredan Gasparini ===
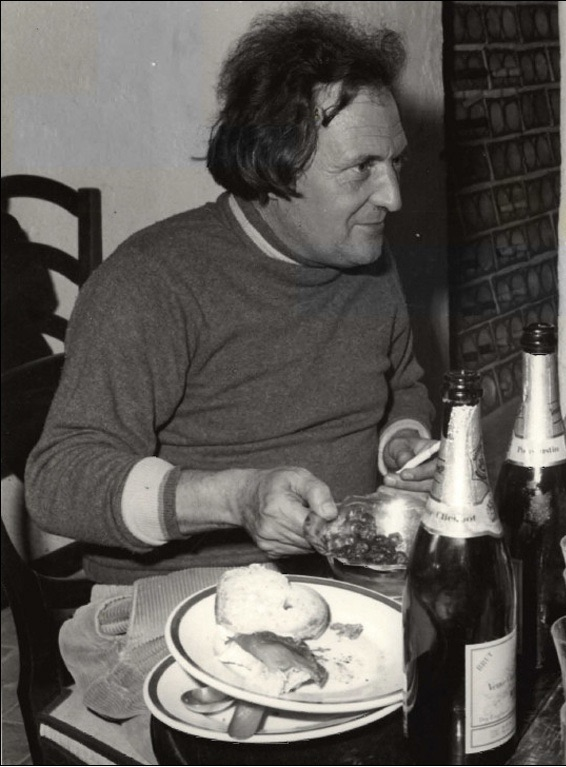
Count Piero Loredan, founder of the Conte Loredan Gasparini winery

The Conte Loredan Gasparini winery was founded in the 1950s by Count Piero Loredan, descendant of the Doge of Venice Leonardo Loredan, who chose the territory of Vignigazzu to establish his home in a grand Palladian villa—The Villa Loredan at Paese.

The winery is located in Venegazzù di Volpago del Montello, in the Veneto region, in the heart of the Marca Trevigiana, an area famous for the production of wines since the 16th century.

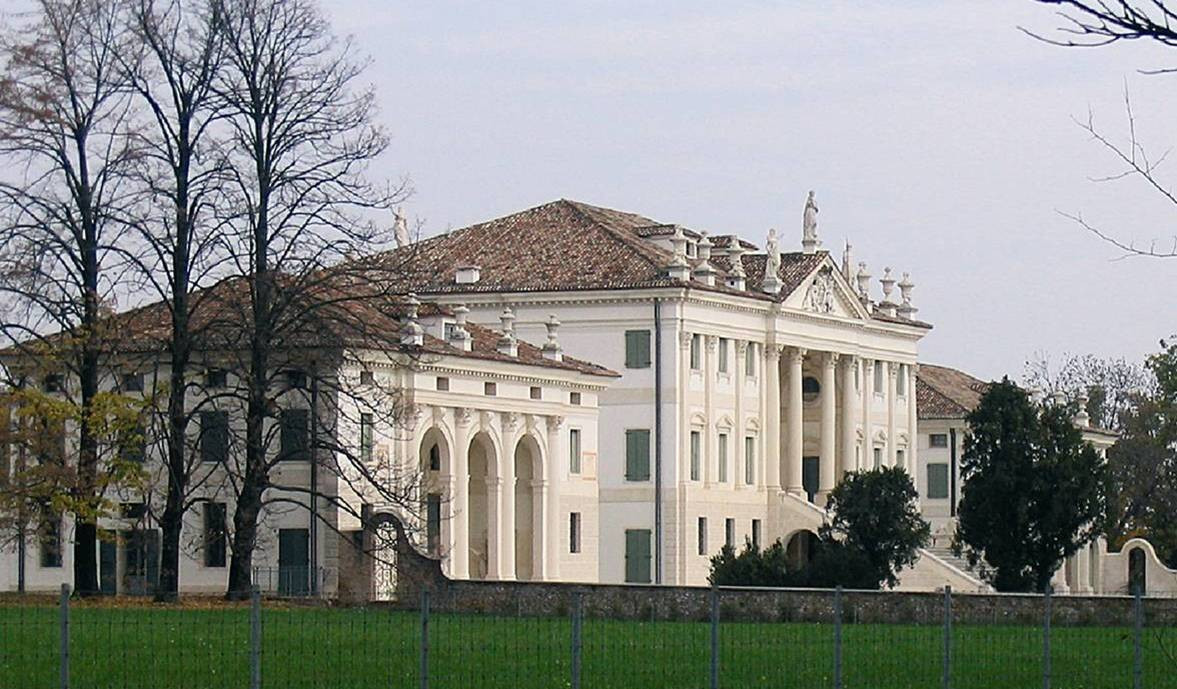

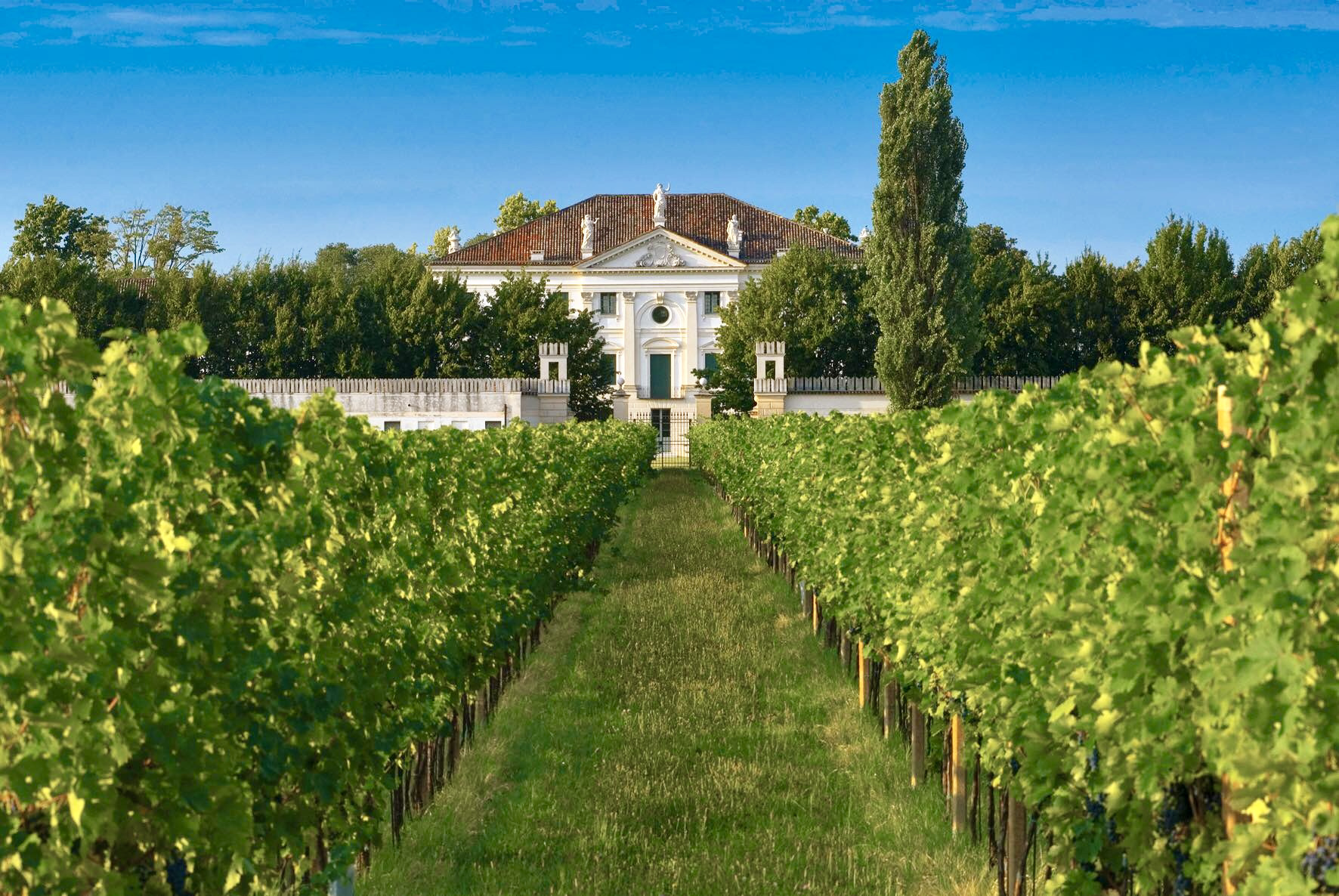

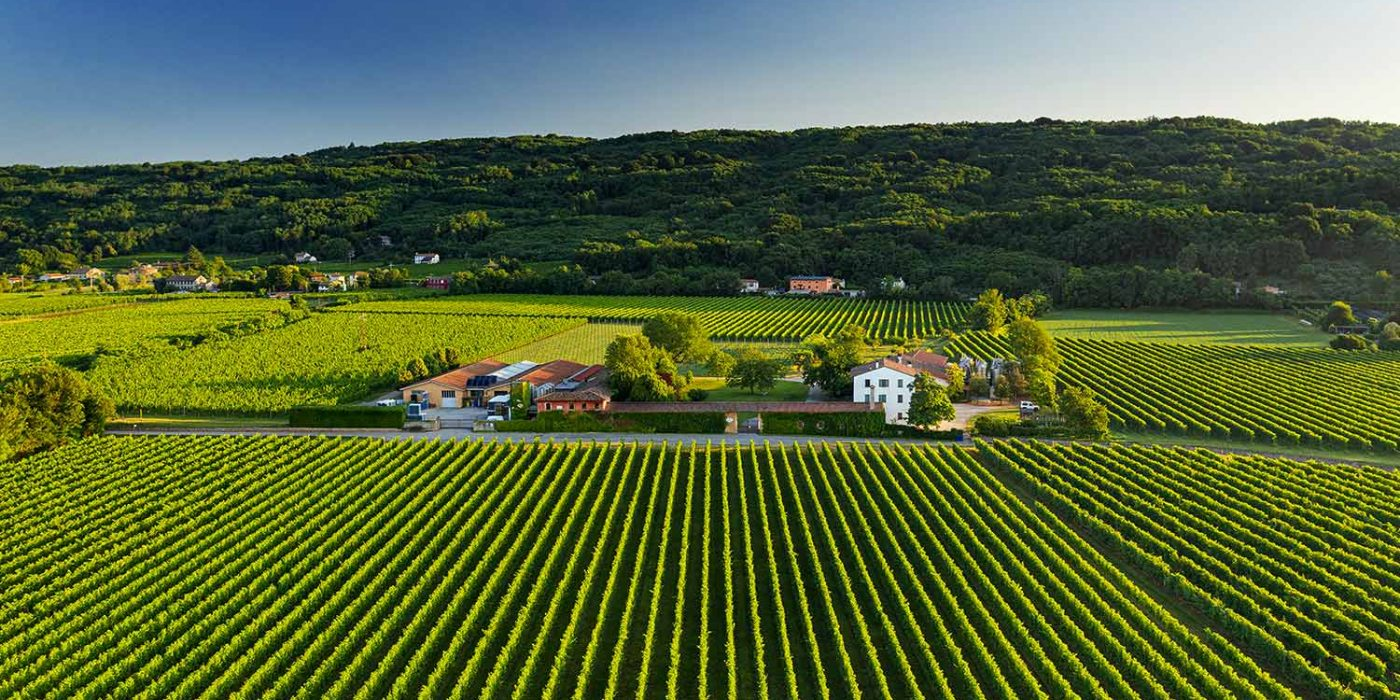

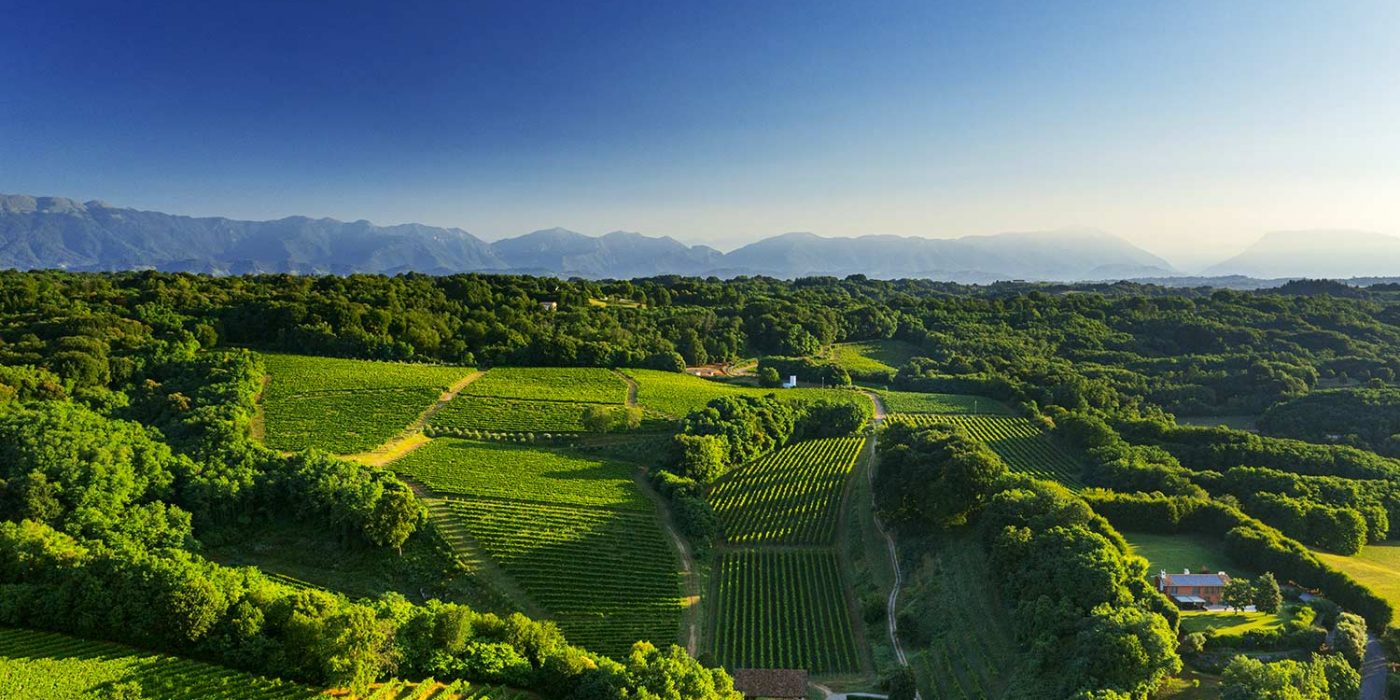

=== Barchessa Loredan ===
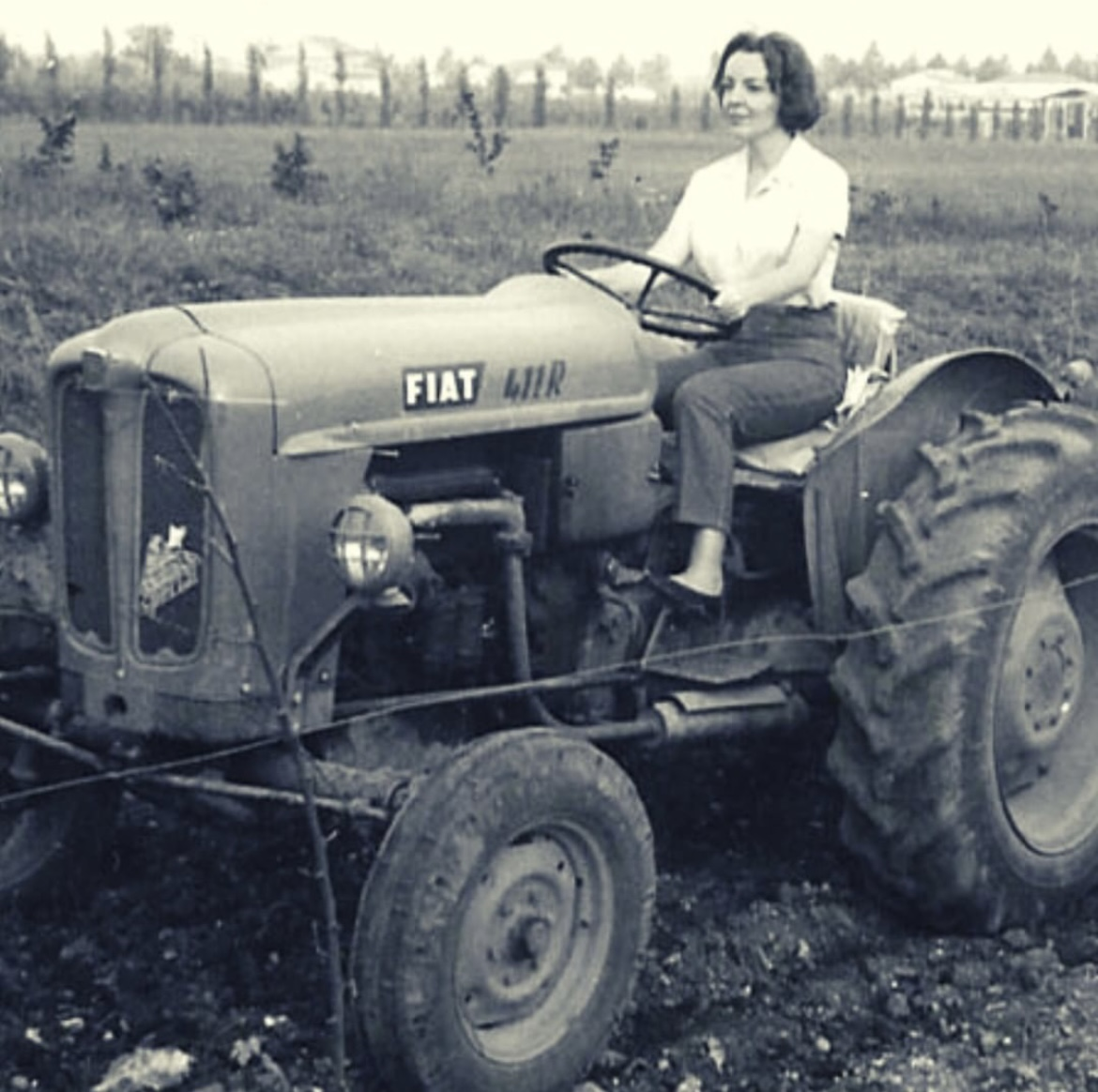
Countess Nicoletta Loredan in the 1960s

The Barchessa Loredan winery is located in Selva del Montello, within a 16th-century Palladian barchessa. It is owned by the Loredan family, who managed the latest renovation.

It directly produces and markets its wines obtained from D.O.C. Montello and D.O.C.G. Asolo. The farm covers an area of 50 hectares (120 acres) of vineyards in the hamlets of Selva and Venegazzù, and is managed by Countess Nicoletta Loredan Moretti degli Adimari, who founded it in the 1960s. The Barchessa, surrounded by vineyards, is also clearly visible from the Schiavonesca state road (Montebelluna Conegliano), to which it is connected by a long avenue of centuries-old hazelnuts.

The Barchessa Loredan is a magnificent example of Palladian architecture. The noble residence was built in the 16th century; originally it was part of a vast complex which also included a large villa destroyed in 1840.

The imposing Barchessa remains of the original complex, with the entrance gates and part of the surrounding wall. The building consists of nine arches with a volute keystone and framed by Doric pilasters supporting a moulded entablature, which extends over the entire ground floor.

Above the portico rises the first floor, with a very large attic, perfectly restored, in which the most significant memories of the Loredan family are preserved.

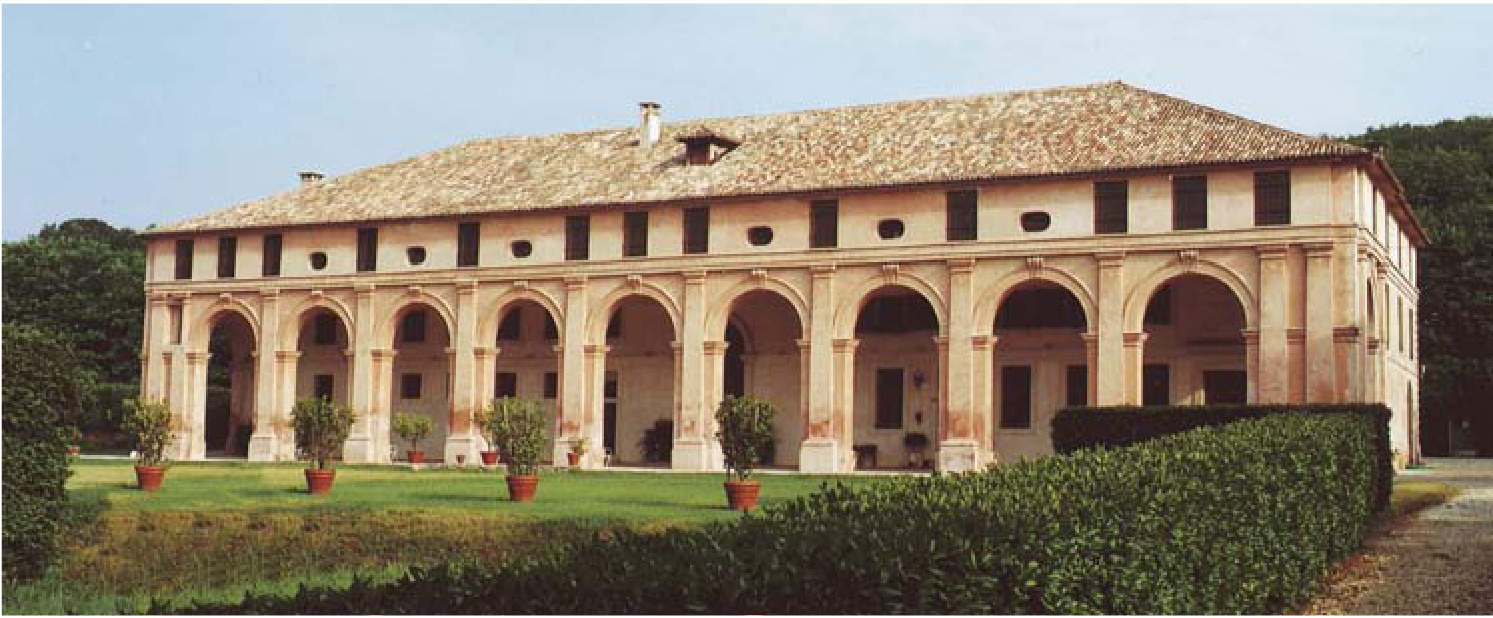

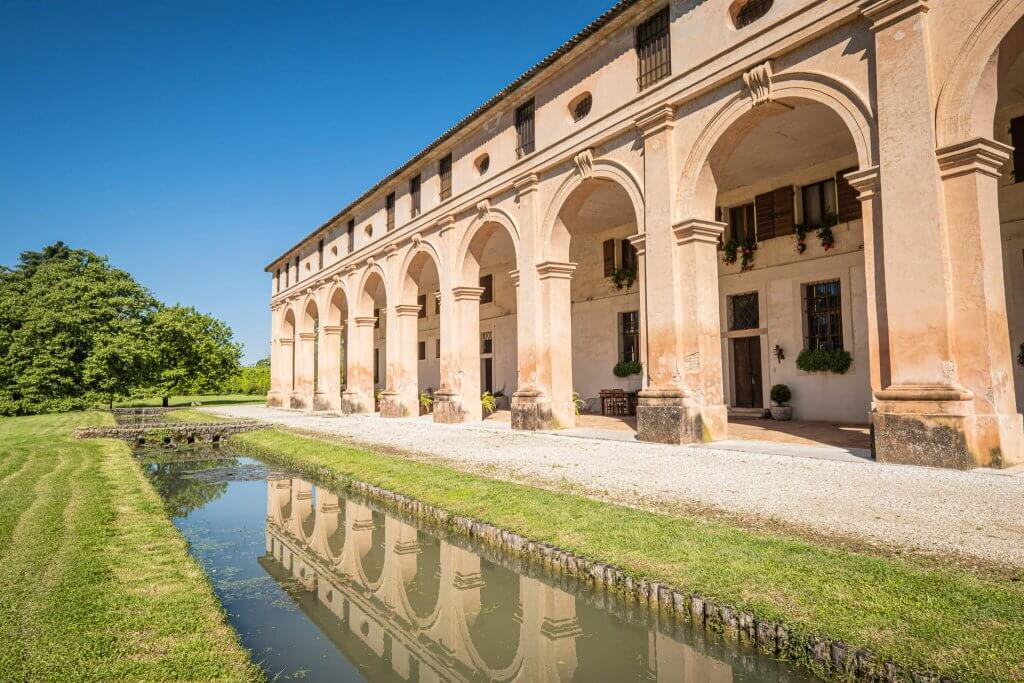

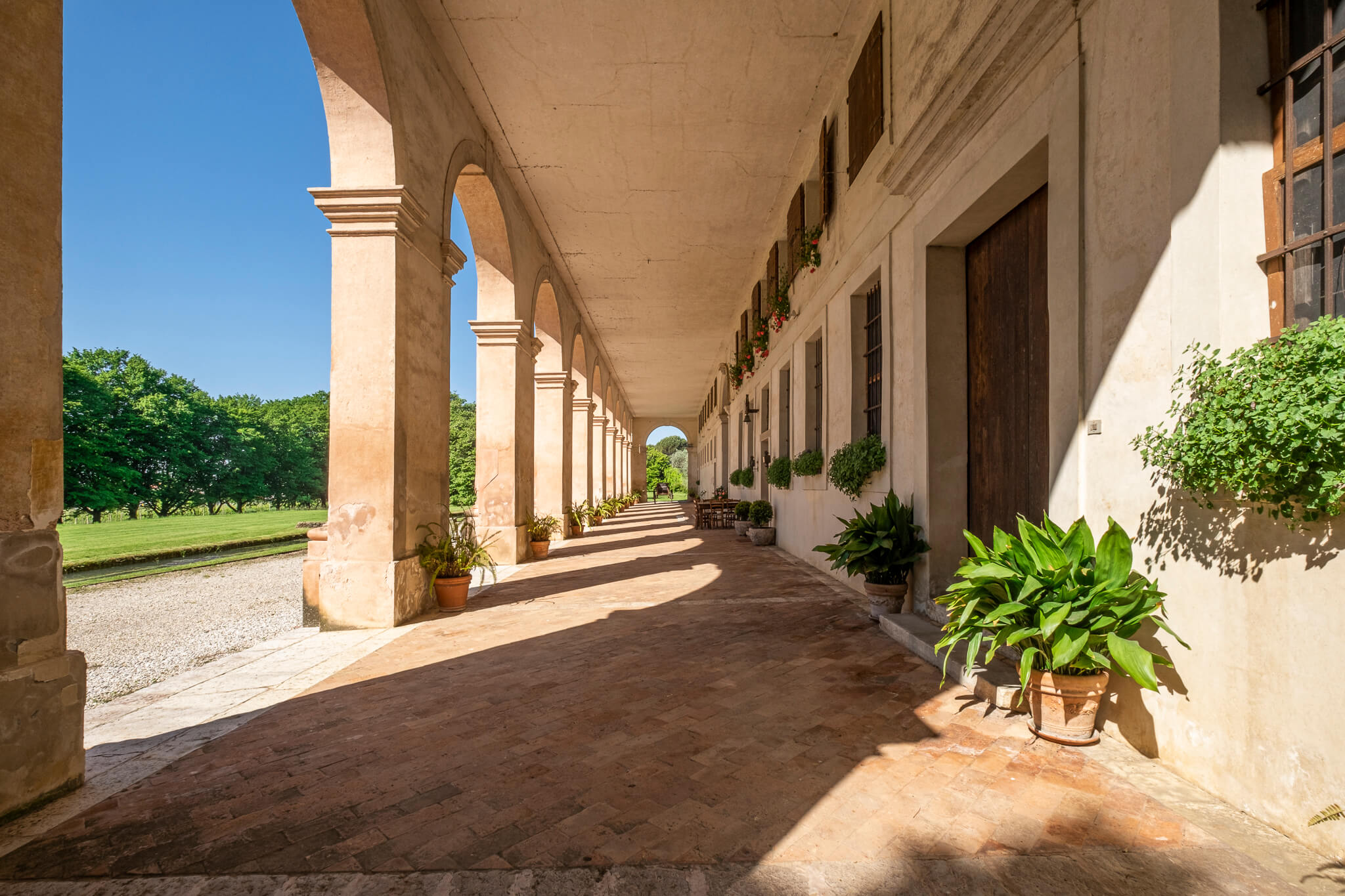

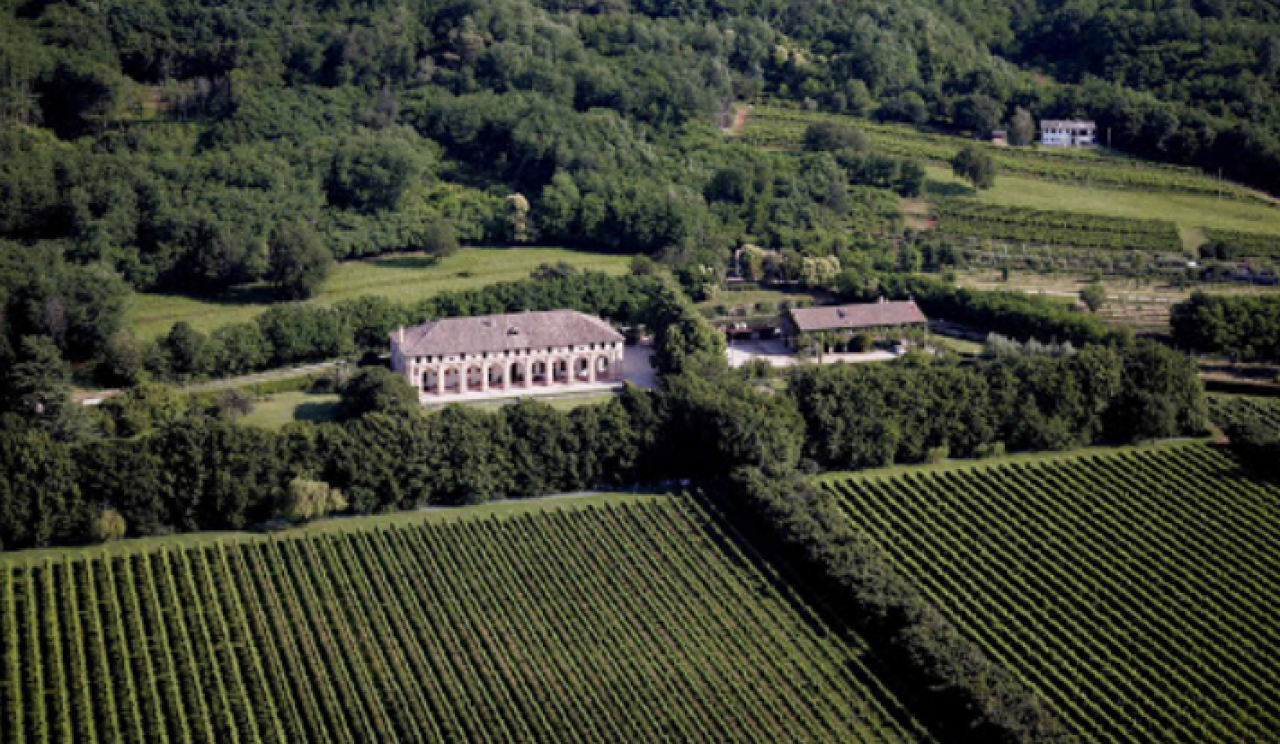

=== Guerrieri Rizzardi ===
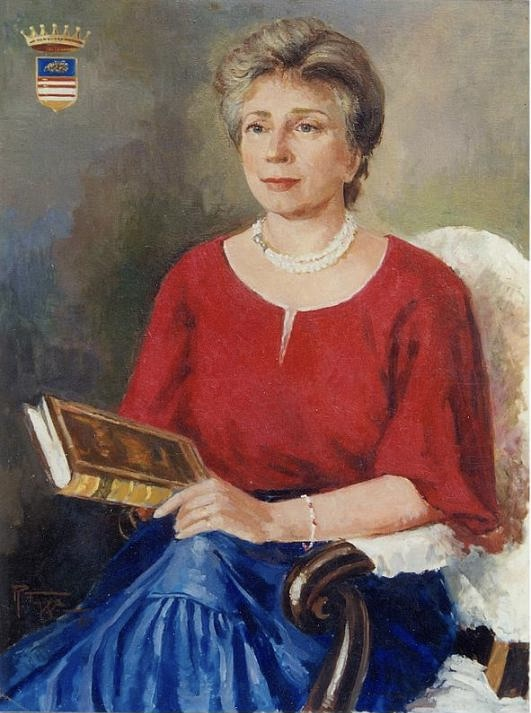
Portrait of Countess Maria Cristina Loredan, by Remo Faggi, 1992

In the 1980s, after the death of her husband Antonio Rizzardi, Countess Maria Cristina Rizzardi Loredan found herself managing the Guerrieri Rizzardi winery, based on Lake Garda. Carrying on from her husband, she further developed the estates and the vineyards, seeking out new international markets and developing new wines. She succeeded in expanding the winery with new vineyards and wines, also applying the concept of 'Cru' as a mark of quality restricted to a well-defined vineyard. The Countess would become a well-known figure in the wine world and her accomplishments widely recognised. Her achievements were honoured in 2010 when she was the first woman from the region to be awarded the Order of Merit for Labour, Italy's highest honour for those who are meritorious business people in agriculture, commerce and industry.

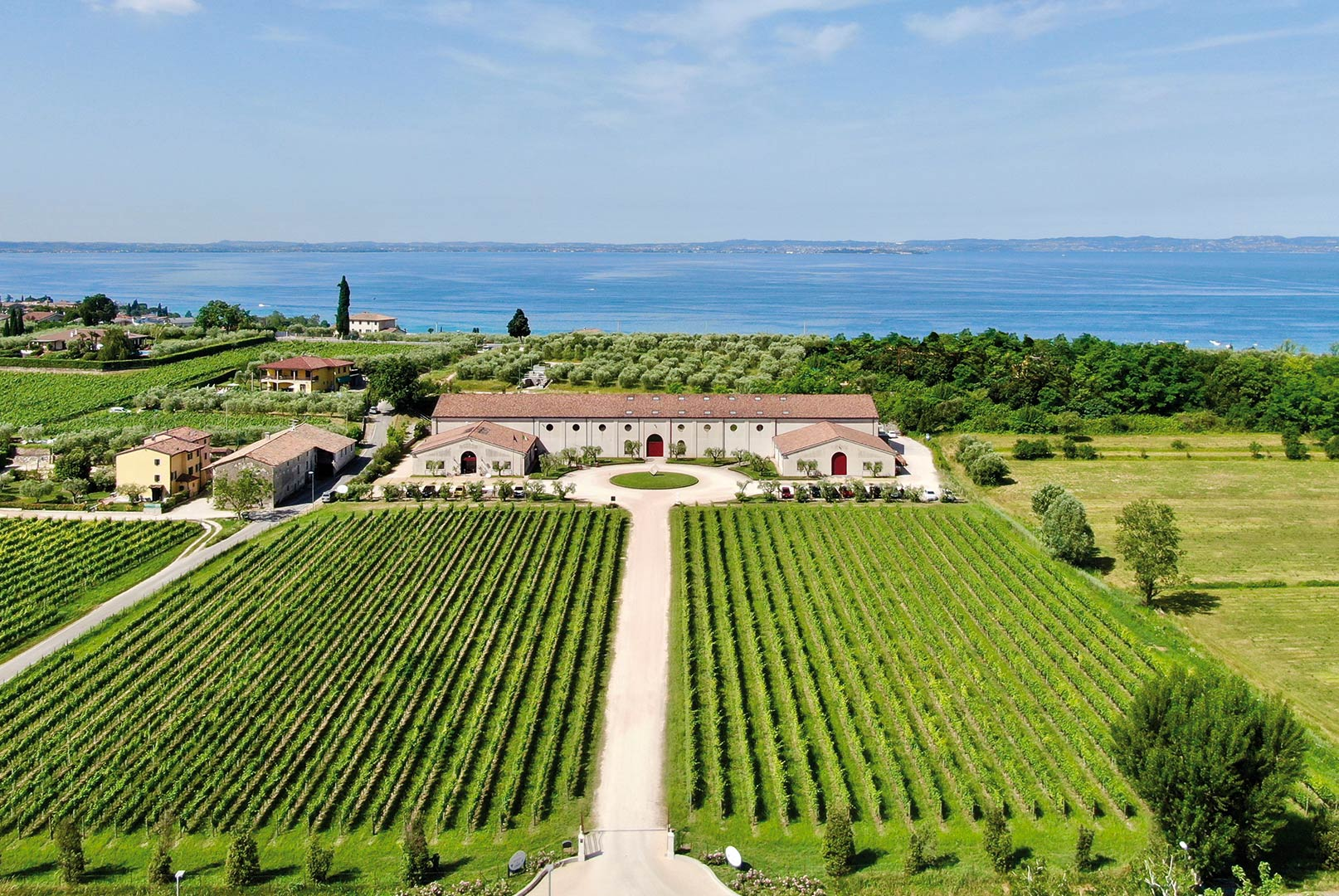
The Bardolino Estate

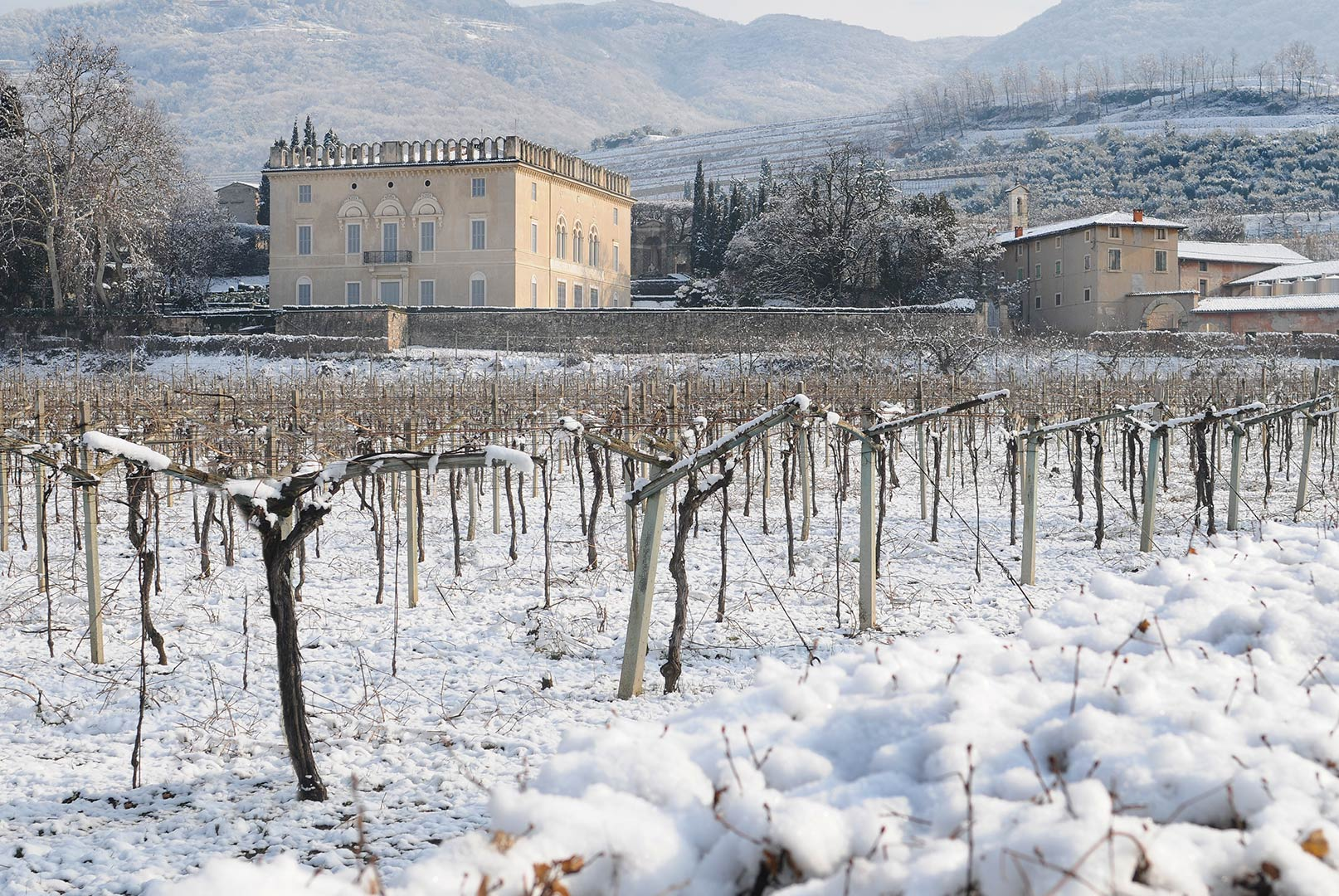
The Valpolicella Estate

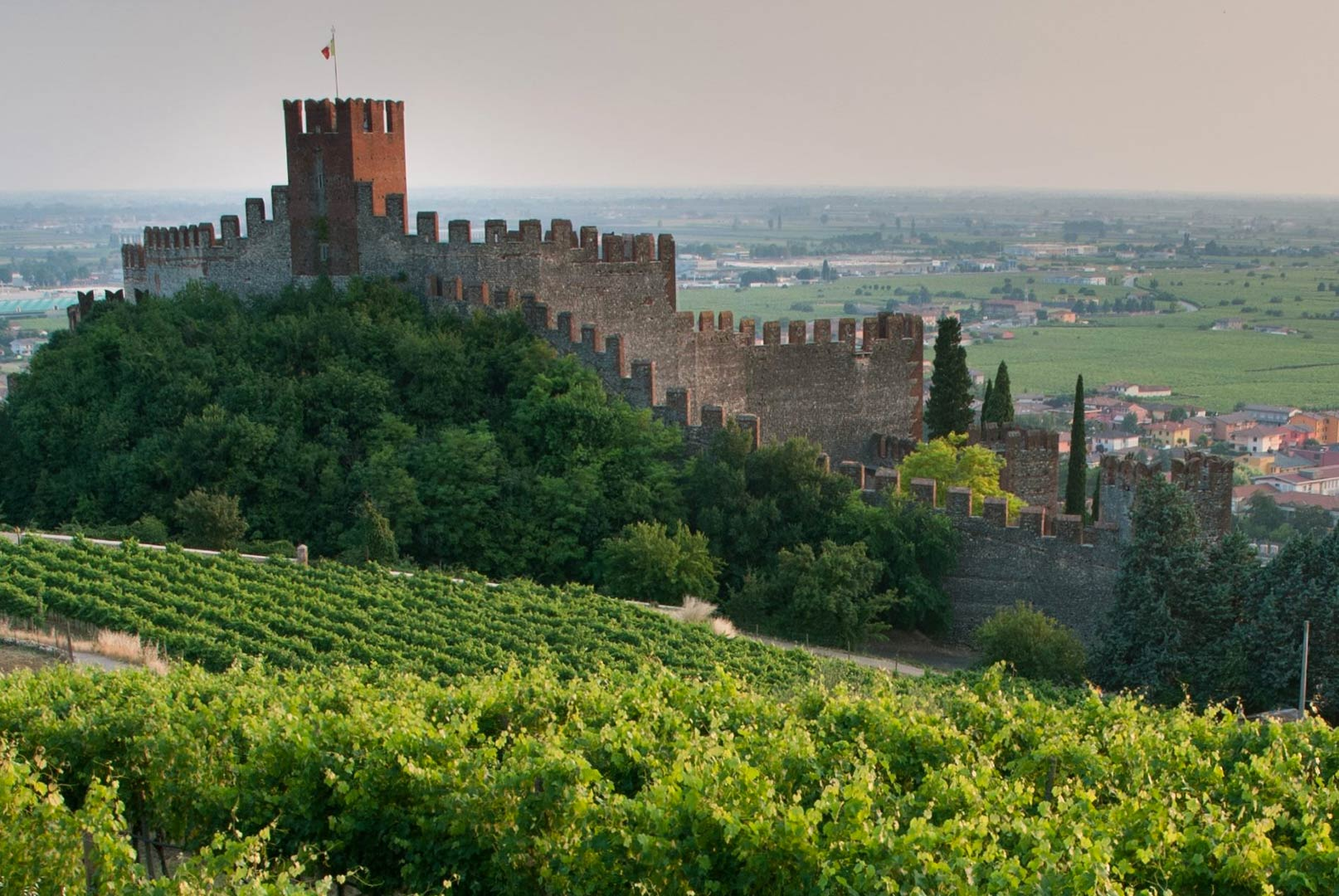
The Soave Estate

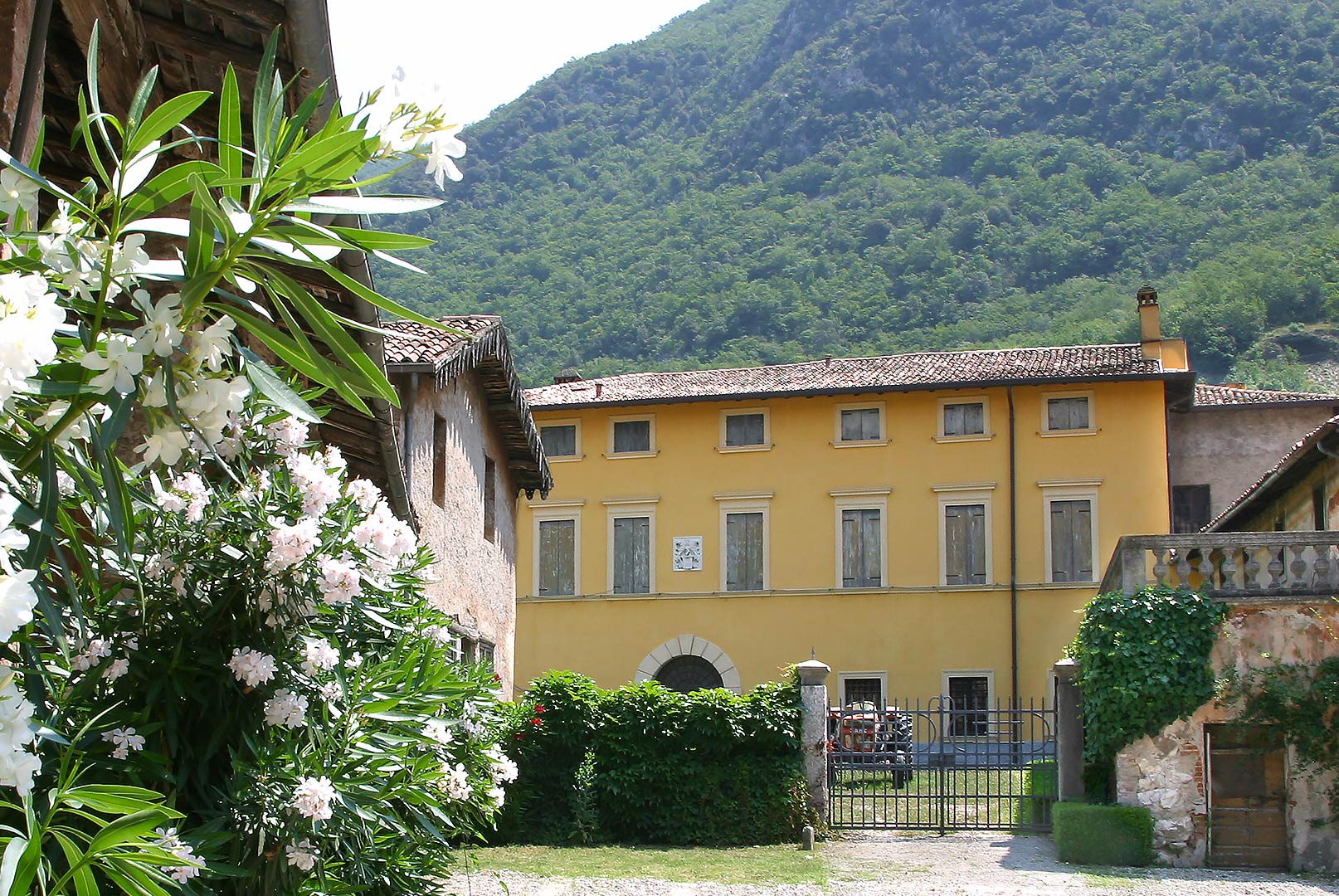
The Val d'Adige Estate

== Notes ==
a: The Loredan family was one of the rare families in which a feudal estate could be inherited by a female heiress. This shows how the family was able to keep ownership of their Istrian lands, Barban and Rakalj, until 1869, a century after the family branch of Santo Stefano, which had owned it, became extinct in the male line.

b: Many families in the Veneto have surnames indicating the town from which their ancestors came from (e.g. Trevisan).

c: Some accounts describe Antiparos specifically as being transferred as part of the marriage/dowry arrangement, while Da Mosto's chronology gives the Loredan possession as 1439–1490, followed by Pisani.

d: Although the Great Council Lockout was formerly provisional, the Ordinance later became a permanent Act, and since then it was disregarded only at times of political or financial crisis (e.g. after the War of the League of Cambrai).

e: The family branch of Santo Stefano was named after Campo Santo Stefano, where the palace is located, although the branch is also known as San Vidal, after the nearby church of San Vidal.

f: In the actual Venetian language, his name was Pie[t]ro Loredan; in contemporary Greek sources, he is encountered as Πέτρος Λορδᾶς, Λαυρεδάνος, or Λορδάνο.

g: By the reign of Pope Zachary (741–752), Venice had established a thriving slave trade, buying in Italy, among other places, and selling to the Moors in Northern Africa (Zacharias himself reportedly forbade such traffic out of Rome). When the sale of Christians to Muslims was banned (pactum Lotharii), the Venetians began to sell Slavs and other Eastern European non-Christian slaves in greater numbers. Between 1414 and 1423 alone, at least 10,000 slaves were sold in Venice.

h: Sansovino places the construction expenditure by the palace's owner at 'oltre a 200 mila ducati - cioè il Loredano a San Marcuola...', referring to the Ca' Loredan Vendramin Calergi.

i: Archival research by Lionello Puppi resulted in a sound date of 1556 for the commission, putting to rest estimated dates ranging as early as 1548 (Zorzi) and as late as c. 1566 (Wittkower).

j: Francesco Badoer and Zorzi Loredan, brother of Lucietta Loredan, were known to have been friends, which may explain the inclusion of the Loredan arms alongside those of the Badoer family. Notably, the two coats of arms are rendered at equal scale and intertwined. This arrangement departs from customary heraldic practice, in which the arms of the primary family associated with the villa would typically be given greater prominence, and has led to suggestions that Lucietta Loredan herself may have wished to ensure equal representation for her natal family.

== Bibliography ==
- Barzman, Karen-edis (2017). The Limits of Identity: Early Modern Venice, Dalmatia, and the Representation of Difference. Brill. ISBN 9789004331518.
- Norwich, John Julius (2003). A History of Venice. Penguin UK. p. 594. ISBN 978-0-14-101383-1.
- Setton, Kenneth Meyer (1976). The Papacy and the Levant, 1204–1571: The Fifteenth Century. American Philosophical Society. ISBN 978-0-87169-127-9.
- Miller, William. The Latins in the Levant: A History of Frankish Greece (1204–1566). London: 1908.
- Stahl, Alan M. (2009). "Michael of Rhodes: Mariner in Service to Venice". In Long, Pamela O. (ed.). The Book of Michael of Rhodes: A Fifteenth-Century Maritime Manuscript. Volume III: Studies. Cambridge, Massachusetts: MIT Press. pp. 35–98. ISBN 978-0-262-12308-2.
- Martines, Lauro (2012). Loredana: A Venetian Tale. ISBN 9781448139828.
- Maidalchini, Francesco. Il Loredano. Panegirico. Venice 1634.
- Brunacci, G. Vita di Giovan Francesco Loredan. Venice 1662.
- Lupis, Antonio. Vita di Giovan Francesco Loredan Senator Veneto. Venice 1663.
- Brocchi, V. L'accademia e la novella nel Seicento: Giovan Francesco Loredan, "Atti del R. Istituto veneto di scienze, lettere e arti", s. 7, IX (1897–98), pp. 284–311.
- Ivanoff, N. Giovan Francesco Loredan e l'ambiente artistico a Venezia nel Seicento, "Ateneo veneto", III 1965, pp. 186–190.
- Morini, A. Sous le signe de l'inconstance. La vie et l'oeuvre de Giovan Francesco Loredan (1606–1661), noble vénitien, fondateur de l'Académie des Incogniti, diss., Université de Paris IV, 1994.
- Morini, A. Giovan Francesco Loredan: sémiologie d'une crise, "Revue des études italiennes", XLIII 1997, pp. 23–50.
- Morini, A. Giovan Francesco Loredan (1606–1661): le retour à la bergerie, in: Soulèvements et ruptures: l'Italie en quête de sa révolution. Actes du Colloque du CSLI, a cura di B. Toppan, Nancy 1998, pp. 73–88.
- Miato, M. L'Accademia degli Incogniti di Giovan Francesco Loredan. Venezia (1630–1661), Florence 1998.
- Loredan, Giovanni Francesco. Morte del Volestein e altre opere, a c. di L. Manini, La Finestra editrice, Lavis 2015 ISBN 978-8895925-60-8.
- Rosand, Ellen, Opera in Seventeenth-Century Venice: the Creation of a Genre. University of California Press, 2007 ISBN 978-0-520-25426-8 ISBN 0520254260.
- Zorzi, Ludovico (1998). Carpaccio e la rappresentazione di Sant'Orsola. Torino: Einaudi.
- Bertoša, Slaven (2005). Istarska enciklopedija. (on the Loredan Terminations and the Barban and Rakalj estate in Istria)
- Bertoša, Slaven (2012). Gli Orizzonti Mediterranei della Famiglia Veneziana Loredan.
- Morelli, Jacopo (1790). Della Istoria Viniziana di Monsignor Pietro Bembo Cardinale. Venice.
- Romanin, Samuele. Storia documentata di Venezia, Venice 1859, pp. 96–142, 302. (on the spending amounts of Doge Francesco Loredan)
- Nani, Giacomo (1752). Componimenti presentati al serenissimo principe F. Loredano doge di Venezia dalla città di Brescia. Brescia.
- Nani, Giacomo (1756). Saggio politico del Corpo aristocratico della Repubblica di Venezia per l'anno 1756.
- Gullino, G. (1985). I Loredan di Santo Stefano: Cenni storici. Venice.
- Merkel, E. (1985). Il mecenatismo artistico dei Loredan e il loro palazzo a Santo Stefano. Venice.
- Pilot A. (1917). L'elezione e la morte del doge Francesco Loredan in tre sonetti inediti. pp. 168–170.
- Simi, S. (1992). Considerazioni attorno un busto di Leonardo Loredan.
- Dizionario Biografico degli Italiani, Volume 65: Levis–Lorenzetti. Rome: Istituto dell'Enciclopedia Italiana. (individual biographies of many family members)
- Manfroni, Camillo (1934). Enciclopedia Italiana.
- Cessi, Roberto (1928). Venezia ducale, vol. 1. Padua.
- Musatti, Eugenio (1888). La storia della promissione ducale (in Italian). Padua.
- Da Mosto, Andrea. I Dogi di Venezia. Florence. 1983.
- Dumler, Helmut. Venedig und die Dogen. Düsseldorf. 2001.
- King, Margaret L. Umanesimo e patriziato a Venezia nel Quattrocento, vol. 1. Rome.
- Battista di Crollalanza, Giovanni (1965). Dizionario storico-blasonico delle famiglie nobili e notabili italiane estinte e fiorenti, vol. 2. Bologna. p. 32.
- Staley, Edgcumbe (1910). The Dogaressas of Venice: The Wives of the Doges. London: T.W. Laurie. (on the dogaressas Caterina and Paolina Loredan)
- Berendt, John (2005). The City of Falling Angels. Penguin Press. ISBN 1-59420-058-0.
- Brusegan, Marcello (2005). La grande guida dei monumenti di Venezia. Rome: Newton & Compton. ISBN 88-541-0475-2.
- Lorenzetti, G. (1974). Venezia e il suo estuario.
- Douglas, Hugh A. Venice on Foot.
- Zabarella, Jacopo (1646). Trasea Peto. Padua. (on the ancient Roman origin of the Loredans)
- Ughelli, Ferdinando (1653). Italia Sacra. Rome. (on the bishop Giovanni Loredan)
- Hierarchia Catholica, Vol. 3. p. 260. (on the bishop Marco Loredan)
- Les Ordinations Épiscopales, Year 1554. (on the ordination of the bishop Marco Loredan)
