= Kurtoğlu Muslihiddin Reis =

Ottoman admiral (c. 1487–c. 1535)

- Born: c. 1487
- Died: 1535; Rhodes, Ottoman Empire
- Piratical career
- Type: Barbary Corsair
- Allegiance: Ottoman Empire
- Years active: c. 1508–1535
- Rank: Admiral
- Base of operations: Mediterranean
- Battles: Ottoman–Mamluk War; Siege of Rhodes

Kurtoğlu Muslihiddin Reis (c. 1487 – c. 1535) was the admiral of the Ottoman Empire, as well as the Sanjak Bey (Provincial Governor) of Rhodes. He played an important role in the Ottoman conquests of Egypt (1517) and Rhodes (1522) during which he commanded the Ottoman naval forces. He also helped establish the Ottoman Indian Ocean Fleet based in Suez, which was later commanded by his son, Kurtoğlu Hızır Reis.

Kurtoğlu was known as Curtogoli in Europe, particularly in Italy, France and Spain. He is also alternatively referred to as Cadegoli, Cadoli, Gadoli, Kurtog Ali, Kurdogli, Kurdogoli, Kurdoglou, Cartugli, Cartalli and Orthogut in several European resources.

Kurtoğlu Muslihiddin Reis was the father of Kurtoğlu Hızır Reis, the Admiral-in-Chief of the Ottoman Indian Ocean Fleet who commanded the Ottoman naval expedition to Sumatra in Indonesia (1568–1569) in order to protect it from Portuguese aggression. The Ottoman fleet arrived in the Aceh province in 1569, whose ruler, Sultan Alaaddin, had earlier declared allegiance to the Ottoman Empire in 1565. This event marked the easternmost Ottoman territorial expansion. Aceh effectively remained an Ottoman protectorate until the late 18th century, and an ally of the Ottoman Empire until 1904, when it largely went under Dutch control.

== Background ==
The name Kurtoğlu means Son of Kurt (Wolf) in Turkish, a patronymic epithet derived from the name of Muslihiddin's father, Kurt Bey, a Turkish seaman from Anatolia who went to northwestern Africa for privateering together with the other Ottoman corsairs of that period such as the Barbarossa brothers, Aruj and Hayreddin Barbarossa.

Hayreddin Barbarossa became a close friend of Kurtoğlu Muslihiddin, who named his son after him. Aruj, Hayreddin Barbarossa, Kemal Reis, Piri Reis and Kurtoğlu Muslihiddin Reis operated together in the Mediterranean on many occasions. In 1522 Hayreddin Barbarossa sent his private fleet to assist the forces of Kurtoğlu Muslihiddin Reis during the Ottoman conquest of Rhodes, which was the base of the Knights of St. John.

== Early career as a privateer ==
In 1508 Kurtoğlu Muslihiddin obtained permission from the Hafsid Sultan Abu Mohammed Abdullah to use Bizerte as his base for operating in the western coasts of the Mediterranean Sea. The Sultan, in return, was to receive one fifth of his profits. Kurtoğlu assembled a fleet of some thirty ships, carrying 6,000 corsairs, and in the summer of 1508 he attacked Liguria, where he landed his troops at Diano Marina and sacked the town. The following year he received an appeal from the Ottoman Sultan Bayezid II to participate in the assault against Rhodes, and in February 1509 he took part in the Ottoman expedition to Rhodes against the Knights of St. John in command of 17 ships, transporting the Janissaries to the island. However, the siege did not succeed and was eventually lifted. In August 1509, near the mouth of the Tiber River in central Italy, he engaged two Papal galleys under the command of Baldassarre di Biassa and captured one of them. In September 1510, with a squadron of nine fustas, he landed at the island of Andros, which was then under Venetian control, and took dozens of captives who were later ransomed. Later in September, with a squadron of six fustas, he landed at the Genoese-controlled island of Chios and forced the governor to pay 100,000 aspri (silver coins) in return for the release of the island.

Between 1510 and 1514 Kurtoğlu operated in the Tyrrhenian Sea and the coasts of Spain, bringing the maritime traffic in the areas around Sicily, Sardinia, Calabria, and the Kingdom of Naples to a near halt. In the summer of 1514, with one galley and three fustas, he captured a Genoese flotilla near Corsica, including its captain, Matteo Trucco.

In February 1515 Kurtoğlu assaulted Rhodes and in July he landed at Chios, from where he set sail to raid the coasts of Sicily. Later that year he appeared off the coasts of Liguria where he captured a Genoese galley and towed it, along with its crew, to his base in Bizerte.

In February 1516 he appeared off the island of Corfu where he received a message from the Ottoman sultan Selim I, who was in Edirne (Adrianople) at the moment, and invited Kurtoğlu to serve in the Ottoman navy. Kurtoğlu was to play a key role in the Ottoman conquests of Egypt in 1517 and Rhodes in 1522.

In April 1516, with a force of 20 ships, he assaulted and sacked the coastal towns of Liguria, where he also captured a galley. In mid April, he captured a fleet of 18 Sicilian trade ships which were heading to Genoa, and sent them to his base in Bizerte. From there he went to Tuscany and blocked almost every single vessel near the port of Civitavecchia. The Papal States prepared a fleet under the command of Giovanni di Biassa and Paolo Vettori to engage him. Later in that month Kurtoğlu assaulted the coasts of Catalonia in Spain.

In May 1516, together with Hayreddin Barbarossa and Piri Reis, Kurtoğlu once again landed in Liguria, and the Genoese allied themselves with the Papal forces under the command of Federigo Fregoso, archbishop of Salerno, in their fight against him. They were also joined by the forces under Prégent de Bidoux, Bernardino d’Ornesan and Servian, which together amounted to 6 galleys and 3 galleons. In the meantime, the combined fleet of Kurtoğlu, Hızır Reis and Piri Reis, which amounted to a total of 27 ships (4 galleys and 24 fustas) assaulted the port of Civitavecchia, before sailing through the Channel of Piombino and landing at the islands of Giannutri and Elba, where they sieged the local fortress.

In June 1516 Kurtoğlu landed on the coast of Apulia and took nearly 800 prisoners. From there he sailed around Calabria to the Tyrrhenian Sea, where he captured a Sicilian ship which had recently arrived from England and emptied its cargo at the port of Genoa before returning to Sicily. He then sailed back to Djerba.

== Admiral of the Ottoman Navy ==
While in Djerba, Kurtoğlu received the ‘’Kapucubaşı’’ of the Ottoman Sultan Selim I who asked him to become an admiral of the Ottoman navy and join the Ottoman expedition against the Mameluke Empire based in Egypt (1516–1518). Kurtoğlu accepted the offer and immediately began preparations, but the Franco-Spanish attack on La Goulette and Bizerte in August 1516 delayed his participation. The Franco-Spanish forces were joined by the Papal fleet under the command of Federigo Fregoso, Archbishop of Salerno, which also carried a force of 1,000 soldiers. They were escorted by the force of Paolo Vettori who commanded five Papal ships (three galleys and two brigantines), the force of Giovanni and Antonio di Biassa who commanded four Papal galleys, the force of Andrea Doria who commanded eight Genoese galleys, and the combined forces of Prégent de Bidoux, Bernardino d’Ornesan and Servian, which amounted to six galleys and three galleons. The combined Spanish-French-Papal-Genoese fleet had searched for Kurtoğlu in the vast area between Elba, Capraia, Corsica and Sardinia before arriving at the coasts of Tunisia. From there the combined fleet set sail towards Bizerte. The French and Genoese ships hid themselves behind the Isle of Galitta at night before attacking the port of Bizerte in the morning. Several of Kurtoğlu's ships which were anchored at the harbour were destroyed, but during the fighting Kurtoğlu managed to capture six French galleys, which he later used during the Ottoman conquest of Egypt in 1517. The Genoese forces landed at the port but were repulsed by the Ottomans and Tunisians and were forced to retreat, during which they lost two galleys.

Kurtoğlu finally left Bizerte and set sail to join the Ottoman fleet which headed towards Egypt. On his way he landed at Albania, where he captured a Venetian ship near the entrance of the Adriatic Sea. In September 1516 he took part in the Ottoman naval campaign against the Mamelukes in Egypt.

Later in September 1516, he arrived at Chios with four galliots and 18 fustas, where he filled his ships with water and other supplies, before sacking the ports of Crete (Candia) which was under Venetian control. At the vicinity of Cape Maleo in Rhodes he spotted 2 Venetian ships, one of which headed towards Kithira (Cerigo) where its crew managed to land but was forced to abandon the ship to the forces of Kurtoğlu, while the other Venetian ship was captured in the sea, together with its crew and captain, Marino Falier, who had 2000 ducats of gold but was forced to pay 3000 more for obtaining his liberty. In the meantime Kurtoğlu captured two more Venetian vessels – one caravel and one galleon. He later sailed towards Fraschia, Rethymno and Chania in Crete, where he captured several other ships. After leaving Crete he assaulted four other Venetian-controlled islands in the Aegean Sea: Mykonos, Skyros, Serifos and Milos. From there he sailed towards Calabria with 15 ships and landed at Crotone, where he bombarded the city's fortress. He later sailed towards Apulia with two galleys, three galliots, six fustas and four other ships, and landed at Salento before sacking Supersano, where he also captured several prisoners but freed them in exchange of 1200 gold ducats. From there Kurtoğlu set sail towards the Adriatic Sea, where two Venetian galleys started following him from visual distance to spy on his moves. At the vicinity of Cape Santa Maria in Lefkada (Leuca) other corsairs joined his fleet, which reached a new total of 22 ships. Towards the end of September 1516 he sailed towards Otranto and captured a Venetian ship from Zakynthos (Zante) before capturing 2 Papal fustas. The Venetians felt intimidated of his fleet and seemed powerless to stop his actions in the Adriatic Sea. In October 1516 Kurtoğlu landed at Lavinio with a force of 18 fustas, where he hoped to capture Pope Leo X who was there at the moment for participating in a royal hunt; but the sentinels of the Papacy brought the news of Kurtoğlu's incursion in time and the Pope was safely rushed back to Rome. Kurtoğlu, in the meantime, sacked every single settlement between Lavinio and Anzio, before returning to his ships and setting sail towards the Island of Elba, which he captured and sacked. In November 1516 he landed at Sardinia before returning to Bizerte.

== Commander of the Ottoman naval expedition to Egypt (1517) ==
In March 1517 Kurtoğlu joined a vast Ottoman fleet heading towards Egypt with his own force of 30 ships near Bozcaada (Tenedos) and once again took part in the Ottoman campaign against the Mameluke Empire. Sultan Selim I assigned him the command of patrolling the Egyptian shores and preventing the escape of Tuman Bay (Tomanbay), the last Mameluke sultan, who finally surrendered on April 14, 1517.

== Establishment of the Ottoman Egyptian Fleet and Ottoman Indian Ocean Fleet ==
In June 1517 Kurtoğlu entered the port of Alexandria with a huge Ottoman fleet of 170 ships, capturing 2 Genoese ships carrying 100,000 ducats worth of cargo on the way. Still in June, with several light vessels, he entered the River Nile and sailed southwards until reaching Cairo, before returning to Alexandria where he captured a ship from the Republic of Ragusa.

In July 1517, together with the Ottoman Sultan Selim I who appointed Kurtoğlu as the Commander of the Ottoman Egyptian Fleet and wanted to personally tour the newest Ottoman province which also provided the title of Caliph to the Ottoman dynasty, Kurtoğlu sailed down the River Nile with a force of 25 vessels, which included large ships like galleys, galliots and fustas. Kurtoğlu established the Ottoman Red Sea and Indian Ocean Fleet, based in Suez, which was to confront the Portuguese fleet based in Goa on several occasions throughout the 16th century. In this period Kurtoğlu received a daily salary of 80 aspri (silver coins). Towards the end of the month he set sail with his fleet from Alexandria, which carried 500 additional Janissaries, and headed to the Dardanelles. In October 1517 he appeared in Rhodes and in December he sacked the Venetian-controlled island of Naxos, which was the center of the Duchy of Naxos. However, the Ottoman Empire was allied with the Republic of Venice at that time, and Piri Reis sent Selim I’s order to Kurtoğlu for him to release the Venetian captives. In January 1518 Kurtoğlu arrived at Constantinople (Istanbul) and was reassigned with the command of another large fleet, despite the protests of the Venetian baylo in the city.

In March 1518 Kurtoğlu captured a Venetian ship near Mytilene in Lesbos, and later that month once again assaulted Naxos. In October 1518 the Venetian baylo filed another complaint to the Sublime Porte, claiming that Kurtoğlu captured 3000 Venetians and transported them to Anatolian ports. In December 1518 Kurtoğlu joined forces with the fleet of Piri Reis and patrolled the waters between İmroz (Imbros) and Chios.

== Commander of the Ottoman Navy during the Siege of Rhodes (1521–1522) ==
In March 1519 Kurtoğlu returned to Constantinople and in September 1519 Selim I assigned him with the command of the Ottoman fleet which was being prepared to capture Rhodes, the seat of the Knights of St. John. The conquest was eventually conducted by Selim I's son, Suleiman the Magnificent, following his father's death in 1520.

In May 1521 Kurtoğlu set sail from Constantinople with a large fleet of 30 galleys and 50 fustas, and headed towards Rhodes for his first attempt of conquering the island. Kurtoğlu also wanted to take revenge from the Knights of St. John, who had killed two of his brothers and kept another one as a prisoner in the island. Arriving at Cape Maleo in Rhodes with his fleet, Kurtoğlu landed his troops on the island and attempted to capture the Grand Master of the Knights, Philippe Villiers de L'Isle-Adam, who managed to escape. Kurtoğlu later blocked the entrance of the Channel of Rhodes and sank several vessels at the port while capturing a Venetian ship from Crete. Realizing the impossibility of conquering the island with the number of soldiers in hand at that moment, Kurtoğlu postponed the final siege to a further date, requesting further reinforcements.

In the meantime, Kurtoğlu joined the forces of Kara Mahmud and participated in the Ottoman naval expedition to Dobruja and the following land expedition to Wallachia, in July 1521.

In early 1522 Kurtoğlu returned to Rhodes and attempted to capture the ship of Philippe Villiers de L'Isle-Adam, Grand Master of the Knights of St. John, while he and the Pregeant of Bidoux were returning from Marseille and entering the port of Rhodes. In May 1522, with 30 galleys, Kurtoğlu appeared at Cape Sant’Angelo, and between June and July he commanded the final and successful Ottoman Siege of Rhodes (1522), together with Kara Mahmud, under the supreme command of Mustafa Pahsa (and later of Suleiman the Magnificent, who personally took the overall command of the siege on 28 July 1522). Kurtoğlu landed his troops at the island on June 26, 1522, and towards the end of July he appeared before the City of Rhodes. The Ottomans eventually captured the island by the end of December 1522.

== Sanjak Bey (Provincial Governor) of Rhodes ==
Following the Ottoman conquest of Rhodes at the end of 1522, Kurtoğlu Muslihiddin Reis was appointed Sanjak Bey (Provincial Governor) of Rhodes by Suleiman the Magnificent.

In March 1524, Kurtoğlu collected a large force of troops from Anatolia and ensembled his fleet in Rhodes before setting sail to Egypt, where he put down the mutiny of Janissaries in both Alexandria and later on the coasts of Lebanon together with Ayaz Pasha. He returned to Egypt in April 1524.

== Back in the Ionian and Tyrrhenian Seas ==
In August 1524 Kurtoğlu arrived at Euboea with a force of one galley, two galliots, and fifteen fustas, and after some time there he set sail again towards Apulia, landing at Otranto and Gallipoli, where he captured a large ship along with seven other smaller vessels. From Gallipoli Kurtoğlu sailed across the Gulf of Taranto and reached Sicily, where he landed his troops and assaulted several ports, before sailing North into the Tyrrhenian Sea and then south to the Barbary Coast of northwestern Africa.

== Return to the East Mediterranean ==
In May 1525 Kurtoğlu arrived at the coasts of Crete (Candia) where he captured four Venetian ships. In August 1525 he was back in Constantinople with his own galley, while he left his other ships at Tinos, where he had captured a total of 27 vessels (6 galleys, 2 large ships, 1 galleon and 18 fustas). In Constantinople he received 3 large ships and 10 galleys from Suleiman the Magnificent and set sail to combat the Knights of St. John, who now operated from their new base in Sicily and damaged Ottoman shipping (the Knights later moved to Malta in 1530, which became their final seat) together with the Maltese corsairs who joined them in such attacks. In April 1527 he was assigned with another mission to combat the Christian corsairs, which he conducted with 10 galleys. In July 1527 he arrived at Cape Maleo with a force of 4 galleys, 3 fustas and a brigantine, and captured 2 Venetian galleys while sinking the Venetian ship named Grimana. He sold the seized cargo at Methoni (Modon) before sailing to Rhodes with the captured ships. From there he sailed to Constantinople, arriving in November 1527.

== Final operations and death ==
In April 1530 Kurtoğlu left the Dardanelles with a force of 36 galleys and sailed to Rhodes. In June 1530 he appeared at the coasts of Sicily with 20 galleys and started chasing Formillon, a famous French corsair of that period, who damaged Ottoman shipping. He then returned to Istanbul, and left the city in March 1532, arriving at Rhodes in April 1532. In August 1532 he went to Zakynthos (Zante) where he had talks with Vincenzo Capello, Admiral-in-Chief of the Venetian Fleet, who later commanded the Venetian forces at the Battle of Preveza in 1538. From the Venetians he bought 400 gold ducats worth of silk and clothes, before setting sail towards Methoni (Modon), during which he captured two Venetian ships (a galley named Zena and another vessel) together with their cargo. The Venetian governor of Zante (Zakynthos), Matteo Barbarigo, asked Kurtoğlu to give back the Zena, but Kurtoğlu refused. The two sides encountered each other, and during the skirmish Kurtoğlu damaged a Venetian galleon while bombarding the Venetian ports of Zante and Kefalonia. In February 1533 he returned to Rhodes.

In May 1533, while Barbarossa was sending a ship that he captured from the Venetians from Alexandria to Constantinople, a squadron belonging to the Republic of Venice tracked down the ship and started bombarding it. Kurtoğlu, hearing the sound of bombardments from a distance, arrived in time to save the ship and chase away the Venetian forces, while towing the ship to the port of Finike in Anatolia and rescuing its precious cargo. In June 1533 he appeared off Koroni (Coron) with 25 ships, before towing a Venetian ship captured by the Ottoman fleet to Rhodes. Still in June, sailing with a force of 4 galliots and 2 brigantines, he captured two Venetian galleys near Samos which carried armaments that were sent for defending the Venetian castle near Coron from Ottoman attacks. He then sailed to Coron and forced the Venetian commander Francesco Nicardo, who was appointed with the task of defending the area from the Ottomans, to sail away. In the meantime he liberated an Ottoman ship that was captured by the Knights of St. John and brought it to Rhodes, before returning to Coron and continuing his blockade of the area with a force of 40 ships, which prevented the arrival of the Venetian support fleet. In August 1533 he sailed back to Rhodes. In September 1533 he patrolled the area between Milos and Cape Maleo to search for Venetian ships and Christian corsairs who operated in the area. In October 1533 he patrolled the areas near Rhodes, where he stayed until his death in around 1535.

== Legacy ==
Kurtoğlu Muslihiddin Reis was from the generation of great Ottoman seamen in the 16th century like Barbarossa, Aruj, Kemal Reis, Piri Reis, Turgut Reis, Murat Reis, Piyale Pasha and many others.

He played a key role in the conquests of Egypt (1517) and Rhodes (1522). Egypt de facto remained an Ottoman province until 1882, de jure until 1914. Rhodes remained as an Ottoman island until 1912.

Kurtoğlu established the Ottoman Egyptian Fleet based in Alexandria, and the Ottoman Indian Ocean Fleet based in Suez, with other later homeports in Aden and Basra.

His son Kurtoğlu Hızır Reis became famous for commanding the Ottoman Indian Ocean Fleet against the Portuguese forces based in Goa and leading the Ottoman naval expedition to Sumatra in Indonesia (1568–1569). Aceh province in Sumatra declared allegiance to the Ottoman Empire in 1565, and effectively became a part of the Ottoman Empire with the arrival of the Ottoman fleet and stationing of the Ottoman troops in 1569. This event marked the easternmost Ottoman territorial expansion.

== See also ==
- Ottoman Navy

== References and sources ==
- E. Hamilton Currey, Sea-Wolves of the Mediterranean, London, 1910
- Bono, Salvatore: Corsari nel Mediterraneo (Corsairs in the Mediterranean), Oscar Storia Mondadori. Perugia, 1993.
- Corsari nel Mediterraneo: Condottieri di ventura. Online database in Italian, based on Salvatore Bono's book.
- Bradford, Ernle, The Sultan's Admiral: The life of Barbarossa, London, 1968.
- Wolf, John B., The Barbary Coast: Algeria under the Turks, New York, 1979; ISBN 0-393-01205-0
- The Ottomans: Comprehensive and detailed online chronology of Ottoman history in English.
- Comprehensive and detailed online chronology of Ottoman history in Turkish.
- Turkish Navy official website: Historic heritage of the Turkish Navy (in Turkish)
