= Battle of Zonchio =

1499 naval battle of the Ottoman–Venetian War

Coordinates: 36°54′N 21°41′E

- Part of the Ottoman–Venetian War of 1499–1503
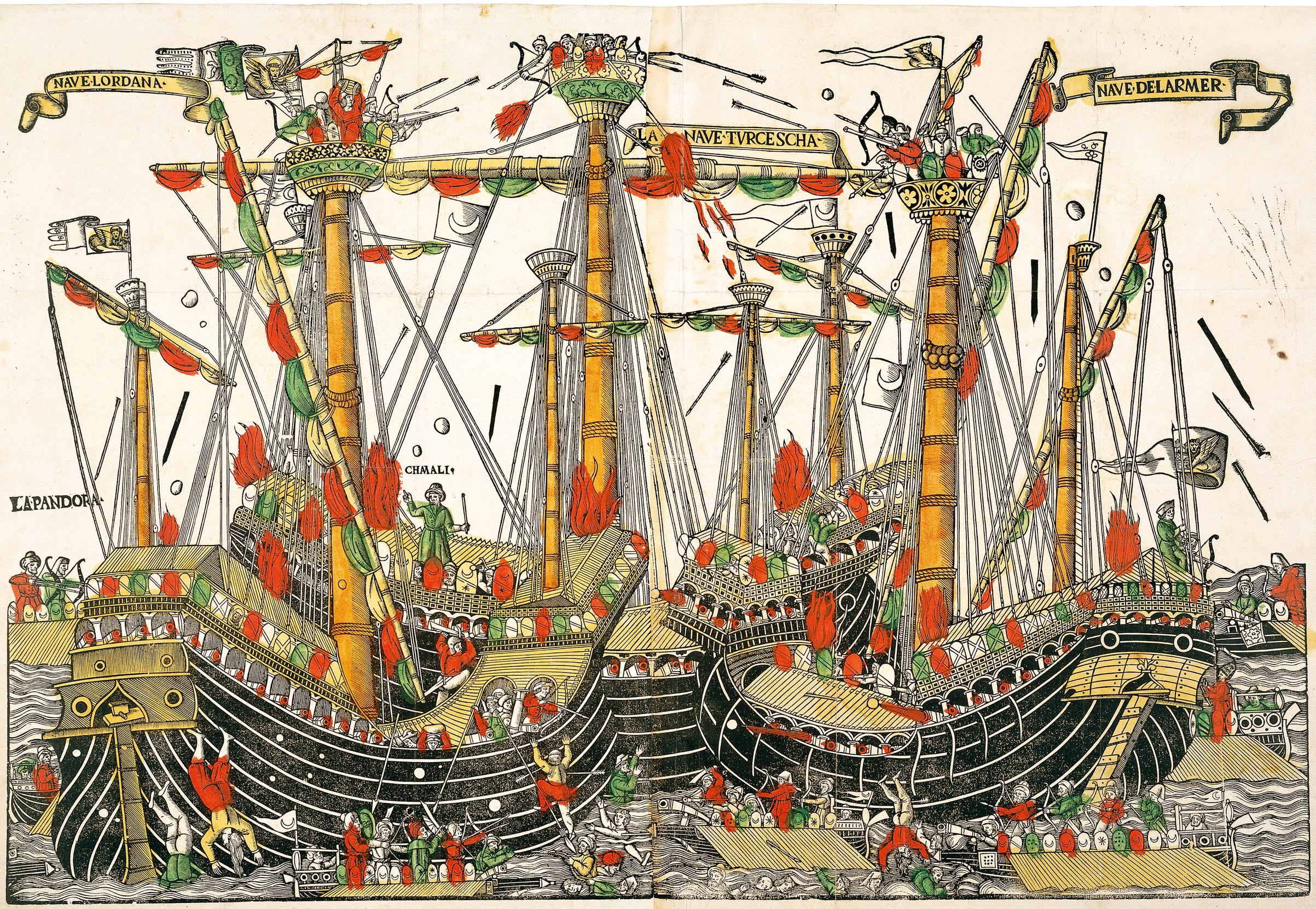
- unknown Venetian artist, British Museum
Date	14–25 August 1499
Location	Zonchio, Ionian Sea
Result	Ottoman victory

Belligerents
Ottoman Empire	Republic of Venice

Commanders and leaders
Küçük Davud Pasha; Kemal Reis; Feriz Beg	Antonio Grimani; Andrea Loredan; Nicolo da Pesaro

Strength
60 galleys 3 heavy galleys 30 galiots 40 fustas 21 carracks 111 barges	46 galleys 17 heavy galleys 15 carracks 4 caravels 11 brigantines

The naval Battle of Zonchio (Turkish: Sapienza Deniz Muharebesi, also known as the Battle of Sapienza or the First Battle of Lepanto) took place on four separate days: 12, 20, 22, and 25 August 1499. It was a part of the Ottoman–Venetian War of 1499–1503.

During its course, the Venetians attempted to intercept an Ottoman fleet en route to conquer Lepanto, but were hampered by miscoordination and repeatedly failed to engage the Ottomans. With their failure at checking their advance, Lepanto fell shortly after. The Ottomans emerged as a serious naval force in the Mediterranean with their victory, followed by a series of similar successes during the war.

== Background ==
In January 1499 Kemal Reis set sail from Constantinople with a force of 10 galleys and 4 other types of ships, and in July met with the huge, 260-ship Ottoman fleet led by Kapudan Pasha Küçük Davud, beginning a large scale war against the Republic of Venice. They were carrying supplies for six months in order to spend winter away from the Ottoman mainland, as well as equipment for a great siege, including 15 great bombards and dozens of smaller ones. The fleet sailed off on 30 June from Gallipoli and headed for Lemnos and Quios. The fleet suffered slight casualties near cape Mantello when several ships sank. Their goal was to reach Lepanto to reinforce the Ottoman troops already in position, who lacked artillery to undertake the siege.

On July 5, Giacomo Giustiniani from Cerigo warned Venetian captain-general Antonio Grimani that the Ottoman fleet was placed between Cerigo and Negroponte with unknown plans. As a consequence, all Venetian garrisons around Morea were ordered to prepare for an imminent attack. On July 10, the Venetian captains gathered in Modon, where Grimani was advised to steer the Venetian fleet to the open sea to prevent the Ottomans from trapping it in port. However, although Grimani was 65 and a proven captain in battle, he was not an experienced leader and had never commanded large battle fleets. He had only been given command because of a donation of 16,000 ducats to the state and personally funding the arming of 10 galleys, and was not told whether to fight an offensive or defensive campaign. As a consequence, he didn't give an order immediately.

== Previous movements ==
In late July, Grimani and his fleet sighted the Ottoman armada between Coron and Modon, but Davud Pasha was not out for battle, but to reinforce Ottoman positions on land, following the coast so tightly that some vessels ran aground and their Greek crews deserted to the Venetians. The Ottomans entered the gulf of Corone on Jul 24 and disembarked some men in Sapienza. Grimani waited for them to do so and followed them, but he found the wind unfavorable for an attack, so he ultimately returned to Modon with his light galleys while leaving his carracks and heavier galleys on the open sea. He sought his chance several times more in the following days, but it failed to appear.

Meanwhile, the Ottomans remained around Sapientza and sacked Sapientza the island. Bad weather had hit them, with the consequence that they lost several ships to shipwreck, possibly as much as ten percent of their fleet, including a large cargo ship loaded with gunpowder and two mortars, which sank on August 7. Days later, between August 8 and 10, Davud Pasha moved his fleet from Sapienza to Navarino and performed his own maneuvers trying to draw Grimani to fight, but turning out to be feints. Battle finally came on August 12 near Cape Zonchio, when the Ottomans abandoned the bay and Grimani found the wind necessary to attack.

== Opposing forces ==
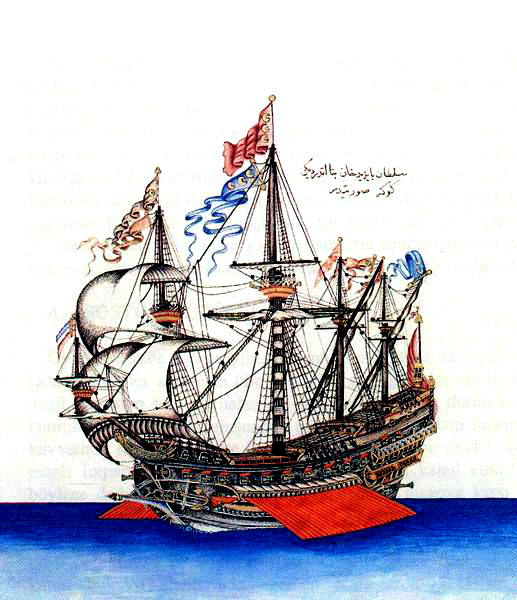
One of the two great Ottoman carracks, called göke, under the command of Kemal Reis.

The Ottoman armada counted 260 ships, including 60 light galleys, 3 great galleys similar to the posterior galleasses, 30 galiots, 30-40 fustas, 23 sailing ships of both war and transport and 111 barges with cavalry and artillery. It carried possibly as many as 35,000 fighting men aboard, many among them elite Janissaries. The main weakness in the fleet was the lack of experienced and motivated sailors, which had forced Sultan Bayezid II to open a levy and conscript masses of men. Seeking to maximize the effectiveness of the Ottoman Navy, Bayezid had given command to veteran corsairs like Kemal Reis and Burak Reis.

As sailing warships were occasionally used by western countries in the Mediterranean, the Ottomans had built two massive carracks called göke (from cog) under the guidance of renegade Venetian engineer Gianni, who had worked in the Venetian Arsenal. The two ships were enormous by the standards of the age, displacing 1800 tons each and carrying over 40 guns and one thousand fighting men, and they were moved by both sails and rows. Their length was said to be of seventy cubits, and their maintops were large enough to hold forty arquebusiers and archers. The ships were thought to be invulnerable to Venetian galleys.

The Venetian fleet was much smaller, with only 95 vessels, although was superior in individual tonnage, carrying 25,000 fighters in total. It was composed of 17 galleys, 46 galliots, and about 15 carracks at the time. Other sources give 123 ships in total. The fleet had more heavy carracks and great galleys than its counterpart, including two 1200-ton carracks, one of them named Pandora. Grimani was confident all of these ships would grant him the victory despite the steep difference in numbers.

== Battle ==
=== Preambles to August 12 ===
Grimani struggled to arrange his fleet due to the size and variety of his ships, but managed to do so, placing the heavier ships in the vanguard to shatter the enemy line and the lighter galleys behind to prey on their opponents after a hopeful rout. He gave order of being as close as possible without entangling the oars and not to leave the center unguarded, and in order to prevent indiscipline, he also decreed that any soldier trying to hunt booty during the battle and any captain refusing to attack would be hanged. He was positioned with his flagship in the center of the Venetian line along with the 15 largest ships under Alvise Marcello. The left wing was composed of 17 ships and commanded by the fleet's main backer, Simone Guoro, while the right wing was composed of another 14 vessels under Nicolo da Pesaro. The support fleet was 11 galleys under Domenico Malipiero, yet another backer.

The Ottoman fleet headed towards them by rowing, towing their sailing ships, while the Venetians held the line awaiting for the wind, but before the Ottomans got close enough, four Venetian caravels and eleven brigantines captained by Andrea Loredan and Simone Greco arrived from leaving their post in Corfu and joined the fleet. An experienced commander, Loredan had been previously hunting down Kemal Reis and desired to participate in taking down his enemy. Grimani was irritated by the intrusion and by being upstaged by the popular Loredan, but allowed him to join the battle and command the first line along with Alban d'Armer. The two choose to command the two heaviest Venetian carracks, with Loredan captaining the Pandora. The Venetians then attacked to meet the Ottomans, although just before the clash, eight Venetian galleys disobeyed the orders and fled from the battle.

=== Battle on August 12 ===
Loredan immediately directed the Pandora towards the largest of the two Ottoman carracks, believing it to be Kemal's flagship, but the latter turned out to be the other, while the ship he had targeted was commanded by Burak. The Pandora and Alban's carrack closed on Burak's ship exchanging their powerful artillery, while Turkish galleys swarmed the two Venetian carracks from the sides. Kemal helped Burak by firing his guns from afar, probably prevented by their own galleys from approaching the melee. While action raged, however, the rest of the Venetian fleet inexplicably refused to join the battle. Grimani desperately called the rest of the fleet to battle with his trumpet, but most captains ignored him, while those attempting to obey were encumbered by being at the rear guard. Grimani himself did not join the battle either, while rowers screamed at the carracks for their captains to be hanged.

Loredan and d'Armer continued engaging Burak at close range against all odds, and after grappling the Ottoman carrack, their boarding parties jumped in and gradually overcame it. However, at this point fire spread in the Turkish ship, either due to their incendiary cannonballs or as a last attempt by Burak, unable to disentangle his ships, to take his opponents with him. With the Venetian carracks similarly unable to disengage, the Ottoman carrack's powder magazine exploded and the destruction spread to the western ships, resulting in all of the three vessels burning and sinking.

Alvise Marcello would later claim the three burning vessels blocked his path to the rest of the Ottoman fleet, so he attacked only two of the three heaviest Turkish galleys. Alone with his carrack, Marcello sunk one of them and set the other in fire with his artillery, but in the process the ship was also hit by many enemy pieces. A Venetian ship sank too, apparently having been hit by both Ottoman and Venetian artillery accidentally. Marcello eventually withdrew without more gains. Vicenzo Polani, captain of one of the Venetian great galleys, attacked alone with his vessel and battled the surrounding Ottoman galleys, while eight light vessels from Corfu also joined, only to be peppered, with one of them sinking. Polani was also forced to flee with his vessel severely damaged and upon doing so, the other ships of her type followed her and fled.

At the end of the day, these of Loredan and d'Armer were ultimately the only Venetian ships which fought sustainedly, aside from a small Venetian carrack, the Brocheta, which was surrounded and sunk, although its crew could be rescued. The Ottoman survivors were rescued by the nearby galleys and carrack, but most of the Venetian fleet left their own survivors to be killed by the Turks. Burak and Loredan had died in the fire, while d'Armer managed to escape in a skiff but was captured. The Ottomans lost two cargo ships and four minor vessels. On August 14, Grimani order the fleet to retreat to Zante to reoarganize and defend Lepanto.

=== Battles on August 20–22 ===
The Venetian armada withdrew to the sea, while Kemal and the Ottomans moved towards Lepanto, capitalizing on the chance and not wanting to risk a more focused battle. They advanced along with the Ottoman land army, which progressed towards Lepanto. Grimani attempted to prevent a repeat of the previous encounter by dividing command between his subordinates, but those refused. A French flotilla of 22 ships sent by King Louis XII arrived then, increasing morale at the cost of complicating coordination even more due to their unexperienced crews. They were composed by 16 carracks, four galleys and two fustas, under Guy de Blanchefort and Prégent de Bidoux.

On August 20, Grimani attempted to stop the Ottomans by sending six fire ships fashioned after caravels, but the Ottomans could see them coming and dodged or intercepted them. The Christian carracks, numbering around forty, attacked then at once, being met by a similar number of Turkish galleys preceding the Ottoman fleet. Although the Christians inflicted damage on them, sinking and damaging many galleys, they could not stop the mass of the Ottoman armada, nor prevent the land army from continuing towards the gulf of Lepanto. On August 22, the Venetian and French fleets intercepted again the Ottomans, driving them against the shore by artillery, but Grimani and his captains ordered to return to the open sea, not wanting to risk their ships, which infuriated the French.

=== Battle on August 25 ===
Before daybreak in August 25, Grimani and the Christian fleet prepared a last attack, concentrating all of their ships. He used the same scheme of the first battle, forming his sailing ships in the vanguard, with the heavy galleasses behind and the light galleasses in the third place. However, either due to the lack of wind or due to indecision at the sight of the Ottoman artillery, the Christian carracks failed to advance again. By comparison, Kemal had rushed to move his fleet to the gulf as fast as possible, leaving several sailing ships behind and towing others with his galleys.

At the end, and faced against the general inaction, captain Polo Calbo advanced with his galleys with eleven galleys, managing to capture eight Turkish galleys before being overpowered by the fire from the Ottoman carracks. The French also attacked, but again followed by few ships. To the Venetians' dismay, the Ottoman fleet finally entered the gulf of Lepanto, meaning the city would be besieged by land and sea. For their part, the French withdrew from the war in disgust for their allies' performance, heading back to Marseille and Rhodes.

== Aftermath ==
The result of Zonchio was a disaster for the Venetian armada, dealing a severe blow to the Venetian morale. It revealed the systemic faults that weighed it down, like appointing unexperienced admirals and captains unmotivated to compromise. The major participants wrote reports blaming each other for wasting the chance on August 12, with Grimani's own claiming about his captains: "the whole fleet with one voice cried 'Hang them! Hang them!' God knows that they deserved it, but it would have been necessary to hang four-fifths of our fleet". Grimani was blamed for the failure and labeled a traitor. His palace and shops in Venice were vandalized, and he was arrested and returned to Venice in chains. He was banished to the island of Cherso. However, in a later twist, he became the Doge of Venice in 1521.

Davud Pasha had lost almost a third of his fleet, but more to shipwreck and storms than to enemy action, and he ultimately managed to reach his goal and Lepanto quickly surrendered. The victory raised the morale of the Ottoman navy, which would start taking a more aggressive role against the Venetians in future encounters. Bayezid gave 10 of the captured Venetian galleys to Kemal Reis, who later stationed his fleet at the island of Cefalonia between October and December 1499. Ottomans and Venetians soon confronted each other for a second time at the Second Battle of Lepanto, also known as the Battle of Modon, and the Ottomans were again victorious under Kemal Reis.

The Battle of Zonchio also reaffirmed the superiority of galleys in Mediterranean warfare, with its engagement of carracks being considered a failed experiment. Large galleys fleets became the predominant way to project naval might.

== See also ==
- Ottoman Navy
- History of the Republic of Venice
- History of the Ottoman Empire

== Bibliography ==
- Abercrombie, Gordon Ellyson (2025). The Hospitaller Knights of Saint John at Rhodes 1306-1522. Pen and Sword. ISBN 9781399048026.
- Barzman, Karen-edis (2017). The Limits of Identity: Early Modern Venice, Dalmatia, and the Representation of Difference. Brill. ISBN 9789004331518.
- Crowley, Roger (2011). City of Fortune: How Venice Ruled the Seas. Random House. ISBN 9780679644262.
- Fisher, Sydney N. The Foreign Relation of Turkey, 1481–1512. Chapter 6.
- San Juan Sánchez, Víctor (2018). Breve historia de las batallas navales del Mediterráneo. Nowtilus. ISBN 9788499679365.
- Stanchev, Stefan (2025). Venice, the Ottomans, and the Sea (1381–1517). Oxford University Press. ISBN 9780192884435.
