= Kurtoğlu Hızır Reis =

Ottoman admiral

- Born: Sixteenth-century
- Military career
- Allegiance: Ottoman Empire
- Branch: Ottoman Navy
- Service years: Unknown
- Rank: Admiral
- Unit: Ottoman Indian Ocean Fleet
- Commands: Admiral of the Ottoman Indian Ocean Fleet
- Conflicts: Ottoman expedition to Aceh

Kurtoğlu Hızır Reis was an Ottoman admiral who is best known for commanding the Ottoman naval expedition to Sumatra in Indonesia (1568–1569).

== Background and family origins ==
Kurtoğlu Hızır Reis was the son of the famous Ottoman privateer and Ottoman admiral Kurtoğlu Muslihiddin Reis, who was known as Curtogoli in Europe, particularly in Italy, France and Spain. The name Kurtoğlu or Kurdoğlu means Son of Kurt (Wolf) in Turkish, a patronymic epithet of Muslihiddin, derived from the name of Muslihiddin's father, Kurt Bey, a Turkish seaman from Kayseri in Anatolia who went to northwestern Africa for privateering together with the other famous Ottoman corsairs of that period such as the Barbarossa brothers, Oruç Reis and Hızır Reis. Hızır Reis became a close friend of Kurtoğlu Muslihiddin, who named his son after him. Oruç Reis, Hızır Reis, Kemal Reis, Piri Reis and Kurtoğlu Muslihiddin Reis often sailed together in the Mediterranean Sea.

== Ottoman naval expedition to Sumatra (1568–1569) ==
In 1565, Sultan Alaaddin of Aceh declared allegiance to the Ottoman Empire and sent a request for assistance to the Ottoman Sultan Suleiman the Magnificent (which was received by the Grand Vizier Sokollu Mehmet Pasha due to the absence of Suleiman who was heading for the Battle of Szigetvár, his final military campaign) for defending his land from Portuguese aggression. Due to Suleiman's death in 1566, the Ottoman naval expedition to Sumatra was sent by his son, Selim II, who appointed Kurtoğlu Hızır Reis with the mission.

Kurtoğlu Hızır Reis was the Admiral-in-Chief of the Ottoman Indian Ocean Fleet based in Suez, with other homeports in Aden and Basra. In 1568 he set sail with a force of 22 ships carrying soldiers, military equipment and other supplies, but was prevented from crossing the Indian Ocean by the campaigns in Yemen. Only some of the cannons were shipped to the Sumatran sultanate (Göksoy, "Ottoman-Aceh relations", 78).

== See also ==
- Ottoman Navy
- Mughal weapons
- Sefer Reis

== References and sources ==
- Kurtoğlu Hızır Reis (Turkish)
- Kurtoğlu Muslihiddin Reis (Turkish)
- Bono, Salvatore: Corsari nel Mediterraneo (Corsairs in the Mediterranean), Oscar Storia Mondadori. Perugia, 1993.
- Corsari nel Mediterraneo: Condottieri di ventura. Online database in Italian, based on Salvatore Bono's book.
- Bradford, Ernle, The Sultan's Admiral: The life of Barbarossa, London, 1968.
- The Ottomans: Comprehensive and detailed online chronology of Ottoman history in English.
- Comprehensive and detailed online chronology of Ottoman history in Turkish.
- Turkish Navy official website: Historic heritage of the Turkish Navy (in Turkish)
- Ottoman-Aceh relations according to Turkish sources
- İsmail Hakkı Göksoy, "Ottoman-Aceh relations as documented in Turkish sources" in Michael R. Feener, Patrick Daly, and Anthony Reid, Mapping the Acehnese Past (Leiden: KITLV, 2011),65-95.
