= Fall of Navarino (1501) =

- Part of Ottoman–Venetian War (1499–1503)
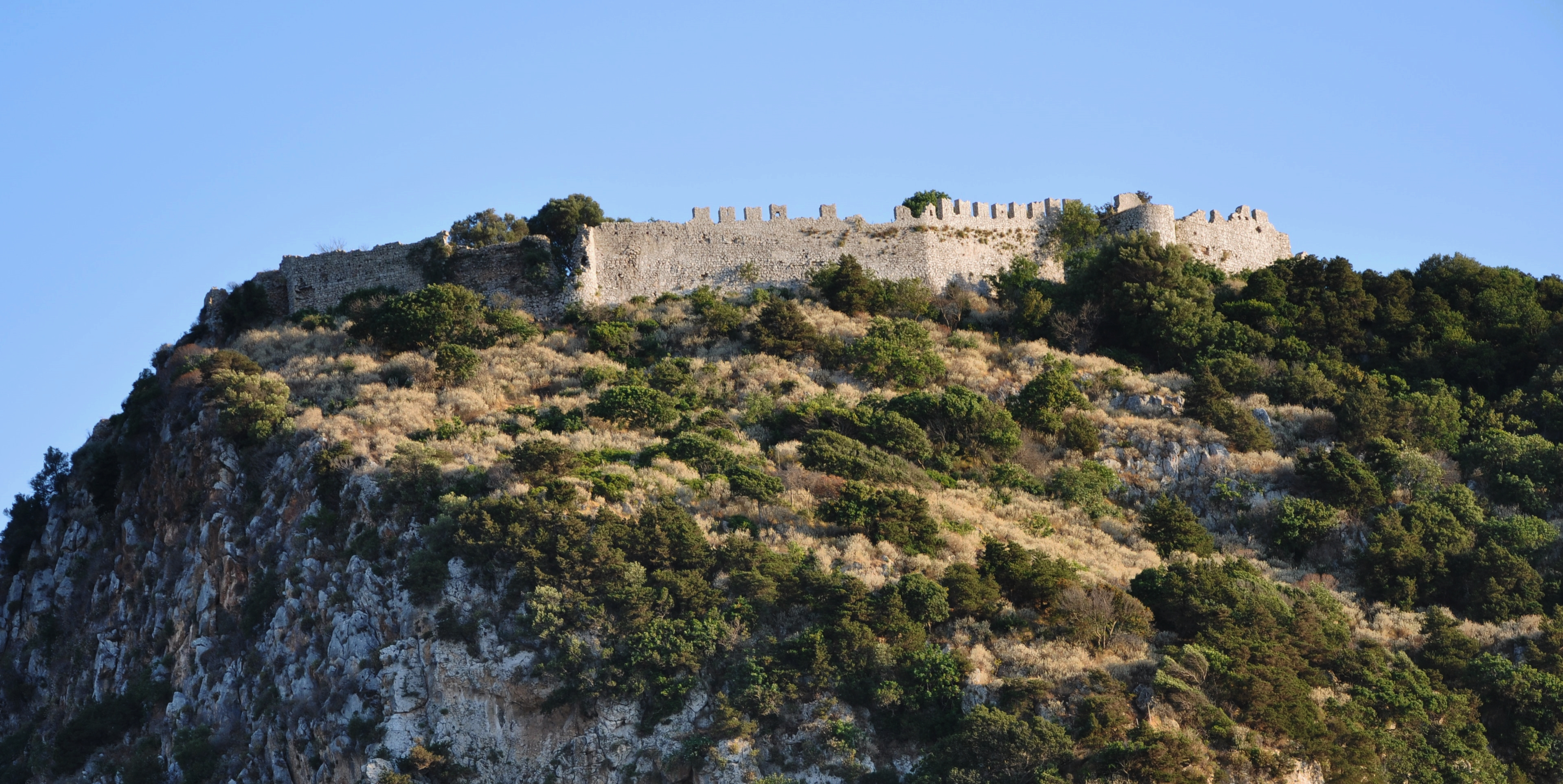
- Navarino castle
Date	28 May 1501
Location	Pylos
Result	Ottoman victory
Territorial changes	Definitive conquest of Navarino

Belligerents
Republic of Venice	Ottoman Empire

Commanders and leaders
(Republic of Venice) Carlo Contarini (executed)	(Ottoman Empire) Hadım Ali Pasha (Ottoman Empire) Kemal Reis (Ottoman Empire) Piri Reis

Strength
4–8 ships 2,000 men	22–30 ships

Casualties and losses
All ships captured Entire garrison slain	Unknown

The Fall of Navarino was a military engagement between the Ottoman forces and the Venetian garrison in the fort of Navarino. The battle ended in Ottoman victory and the subsequent recapture of Navarino.

== Background ==
When the news reached Pope Alexander VI regarding the fall of Coron, Navarino, and Modon by the Ottomans, he dispatched papal legates to Europe calling for a Crusade. France, Hungary, and Spain answered the call. The Crusader fleet composed of French, Spanish, Papal, and Venetian ships, set out in autumn and easily captured Cephalonia in 1500. On December 3, the Venetians led by Benedetto Pesaro managed to recapture Navarino with 1 galley carrying 50 men. They successfully recaptured the castle using a ruse. When the Ottoman Sultan Bayezid II learned of the Venetian recapture, he dispatched a joint land and navy force to recapture the city. The navy was led by Kemal Reis while the land forces wer led by Hadım Ali Pasha.

== Battle ==
The Ottomans arrived on 28 May, 1501. The Venetian garrison was led by Carlo Contarini. They had a garrison of 2,000 men and either four or eight ships in the harbor. The Ottoman navy had between 22 and 30 ships. The attack began when Kemal Reis assaulted the harbor. In the following battle, the Ottomans emerged victorious with all Venetian ships captured and the death or capture of several crewmen. Afterwards, the land forces under Hadim Ali Pasha assaulted and scaled the walls, captured several commanders and began slaughtering inside. By the end of the day, all Venetian ships were captured and the entire garrison was slain. Seeing the battle was lost, Contarini surrendered and asked for free passage to the island of Corfu which the Ottomans agreed to. Kemal Reis's nephew, Piri Reis, participated in the naval battle.

== Aftermath ==
The loss of Navarino angered the Venetian admiral Benedetto Pesaro who had Contarini executed for his failure. Fourteen days after the capture, the Ottoman navy arrived in Istanbul where the sultan awarded Kemal 3,000 akçe while Piri received a raise of five akçe per day.

== Sources ==
- Christine Isom-Verhaaren (2021), The Sultan's Fleet, Seafarers of the Ottoman Empire.
- Gordon Ellyson Abercrombie (2025), The Hospitaller Knights of Saint John at Rhodes 1306–1522.
- Vincenzo Errante (1883), History of the Ottoman Empire from Osman to the Peace of Karlowitz, Vol II.
- Kenneth M. Setton (1989), A History of the Crusades, Vol VI, The Impact of the Crusades on Europe.
- James Mitchell (1831), The History of the Maritime Wars of the Turks.
