= Andrea Loredan (admiral) =

15th-century Venetian admiral

- Duke of Corfu
- Known for: successful exploits against pirates in the Mediterranean
- Born: 1455; Venice
- Died: 1499 (aged 43–44); Zonchio, Ionian Sea
- Cause of death: died in the Battle of Zonchio on a burning ship
- Family: House of Loredan
- Father: Francesco di Giovanni Loredan

Andrea Loredan (1455–1499) was a Venetian admiral and the Duke of Corfu, as well as a member of the noble family of Loredan. He is known for his successful exploits against pirates who raged across the Adriatic and the Mediterranean.

== Biography ==
He was born in Venice around 1455 to Francesco di Giovanni and Lodovica di Marsilio da Sant'Ippolito, originally from Corfu. The parents had only sons: in addition to Andrea, Antonio and Giacomo, as attested by the plaque in memory of the mother in the church of S. Andrea della Zirada, were both vital elements of the Venetian navy, and Luca, born in about 1471, who rushed to defend the city of Padua in 1509 during the War of the League of Cambrai.

Andrea was approved in Avogadoria di Comun in 1474 and thus became part of the Great Council of the Serenissima. The only office to which he seems to have been elected, on 18 August 1489, before the glorious maritime enterprises, was that of chamberlain of the Comun, to carry out general treasury operations for the state coffers. He left this office prematurely as he was elected, on 18 April 1490, as captain of the galleys in the East in place of Marco Correr. On his return, on 16 July 1491, he was elected among the "Three Wise Men" (i tre savi) administering the Venetian Navy at Rialto (as part of the Venetian Republic's structure of appointing a group of three magistrates for different government tasks), but his undoubted ability as a seaman did not escape the Venetian governing bodies, which successfully employed him in risky operations.

Loredan enjoyed an excellent reputation as a just captain, liberal with convicts, but also severe, not allowing any kind of excess, such as gambling and blasphemy, on his ships. He was the first to set a good example and demand from the nobles with which he embarked to keep their cabins in good order and always with the doors open, so that all the sailors could see their work. For these reasons he was loved by the crew, who followed him in the difficult exploits against some of the most ferocious pirates who raged across the Adriatic and the Mediterranean.

In 1493, as an administrator of a small fleet, he did not hesitate to chase the Turkish pirate Kemal Reis from whom he managed to steal many boats and destroyed a large number by fire; in the same year, near the island of Cephalonia, he managed to intercept and capture the boat of an unidentified "Florentine corsair" carrying 120 men who were mostly hanged. The famous privateer Pietro Biscaglino and his men suffered the same fate. In 1494, following the capture and hanging made by Loredan, near Zakynthos, of the pirate Bazuola, whose fleet flew the French flag, an envoy in the name of King Charles VIII arrived in Venice to ask for compensation of 80,000 ducats for damages caused. Loredan carried out many other victorious enterprises in those years against pirates who infested the coasts of Tunisia, making the navigation for the Venetian merchant convoys safer.

In September 1496 he was again elected captain of the armed ships, in the anti-French defensive function. On 18 April 1497 he set sail from Venice, sailing towards Istria on a mighty "barza granda armada" of about 1200 tonnes, with a crew of 450 men, skilled sailors and fighters, equipped with more than 400 guns and other artillery, well stocked with arquebuses and provisions. Following him, with another galley, Daniele Pasqualigo was sent.

In August he was ordered to join the Captain General of the Sea Melchiorre Trevisan to contain the hostile actions of the Turks who had taken the large galley of Alvise Zorzi. Loredan understood that the privateer Pedro Navarro, who had caused a lot of damage to Venetian ships, had found refuge with four galleys in the port of Roccella Ionica, near Crotone, and quickly reached him with two "grippi" (small galleys), armed with 300 men, and after six hours of fierce battle he managed to wound him, disperse his companions and storm the tower. He also tried to conquer the castle of Antonio Centelles, Marquese of Crotone and Navarro's backer, but after two days of fighting, Loredan ordered the retreat, not before having seized all the enemy artillery, devastating the countryside and setting fire to the privateer galleys. While sailing towards Modone, in September the Senate ordered him to return to Sicily.

In March 1498 he was ordered to return to the east and on 15 September the Senate allowed him and Pasqualigo to return home. Once there, Loredan presented himself, on 28 December, in front of the Senate, where he turned in an accurate report of his work and received public praise from Doge Agostino Barbarigo.

On 30 June 1499 Andrea Loredan became the duke (governor) of Corfu, in the difficult moment when the Serenissima was engaged, as an ally of Louis XII of France, against the Duchy of Milan and at the same time threatened by sea by the Ottoman fleet, which Bayezid II seemed to be directing towards Corfu.

As the new Duke of Corfu, the Senate ordered him to go, with his galleys, directly to the island without making stopovers and to immediately put himself in the service of Antonio Grimani, Captain General of the Sea. As a prerogative he was given 400 silver ducats. He was joined by the valiant Marco di Santi, as secretary, and also Simon di Greci, who will soon meet his death with him.

Arriving at their destination and obtaining accurate information, Loredan promptly communicated that the Turkish aims were not directed to Corfu, but to Lepanto. He gathered, therefore, as many ships as he could, also embarking civilians who had spontaneously offered to follow him to defend the Venetian honour. On the consistency of this small fleet the chroniclers disagree: it was probably made up of 11 grippi and 4 ships or caravels, while D. Malipiero wrote it had 28 logs with 1000 men. Loredan sailed from Corfu without waiting for an official order and some delay occurred in the communication system. So on 12 August he unexpectedly arrived in Prodano, where the Venetian fleet had already been concentrated, waiting for favourable winds to wage battle against the Turks, who had landed at the port of Sapienza (or Zonchio), where the following Battle of Zonchio would take place.

The meeting with the Captain General, Grimani, to whom Loredan immediately went to pay homage, was rather tense; Grimani reproached him for having left Corfu unattended, but allowed him to use the boat he liked best. Loredan immediately boarded the Pandora ship, ordering that weapons be brought to him: his fame was so great that the whole army acclaimed him rhythmising his name. When captain Albano d'Armer was the first to attack the most imposing Turkish ship, Loredan followed him and the three boats were chained together, starting a battle that lasted more than half a day. During the most critical stage of the battle, two Venetian carracks boarded one of the command ships of the Ottoman fleet. The commander of the vessel, Burak Reis, was unable to disentangle his ship from the boarders and chose to set her aflame. Suddenly the flames flared up and there was no escape for the fighters, without any Venetian ship coming to their aid.

The news of Loredan's death as a hero aroused intense emotion in Venice and his death cost Antonio Grimani the immediate replacement and arrest upon his arrival in Venice on 2 November 1499.
