= Ottoman–Venetian War (1499–1503) =

Second conflict between the Ottoman Empire and the Republic of Venice

Second Ottoman–Venetian War
- Part of the Ottoman–Venetian wars and Spanish–Ottoman wars
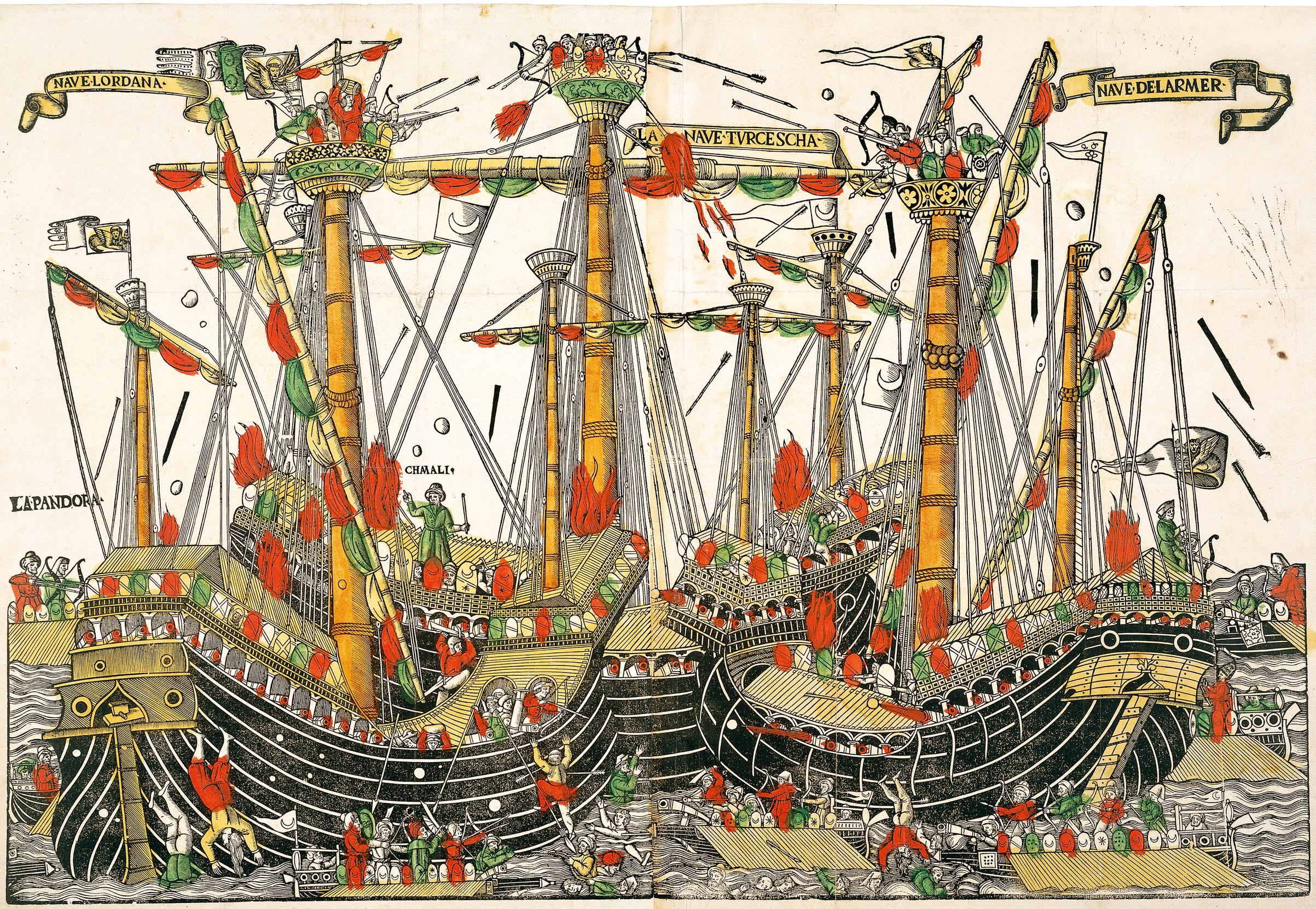
- The Battle of Zonchio
Date	1499–1503
Location	Adriatic, Ionian and Aegean Seas
Result	Ottoman victory
Territorial changes	Venetian strongholds of Coron, Modon, Durazzo, and Lepanto annexed to the Ottomans; Cephalonia and Ithaca to Venice

Belligerents
Republic of Venice; Castile and Aragon	Ottoman Empire

Commanders and leaders
Antonio Grimani; Gonzalo de Córdoba	Kemal Reis; Feriz Beg

The Second Ottoman–Venetian War was fought from 1499 to 1503 between the Ottoman Empire and the Republic of Venice for control of contested lands in the Aegean Sea, the Ionian Sea, and the Adriatic Sea. The Ottomans, under the command of Admiral Kemal Reis, were victorious and forced the Venetians to recognize their gains at the end of the war.

== War ==
=== 1499 ===
In January 1499, Kemal Reis set sail from Constantinople with a force of 10 galleys and 4 other types of ships, and in July 1499 met with the huge Ottoman fleet and took over its command in order to wage a large-scale war against the Republic of Venice. The Ottoman fleet consisted of 67 galleys, 20 galliots, and about 200 smaller vessels. In August, Kemal Reis defeated the Venetian navy under the command of Antonio Grimani at the Battle of Zonchio (also known as the Battle of Sapienza or the First Battle of Lepanto). It was the first naval battle in history with cannons used on ships, and took place on four separate days: 12, 20, 22 and 25 August. After reaching the Ionian Sea with the large Ottoman fleet, Kemal Reis encountered the Venetian fleet of 47 galleys, 17 galliots, and about 100 smaller vessels under the command of Antonio Grimani near Cape Zonchio and won an important victory. During the battle, Kemal Reis sank the galley of Andrea Loredan, a member of the influential Loredan family of Venice. Antonio Grimani was arrested on 29 September but was eventually released. Grimani later became the Doge of Venice in 1521. The Ottoman Sultan Bayezid II gifted 10 of the captured Venetian galleys to Kemal Reis, who stationed his fleet at the island of Cefalonia between October and December.

Ottoman land incursions into Venetian Dalmatia also started in 1499, under command of Isa Pasha and Feriz Beg.

=== 1500 ===
In December 1499, the Venetians attacked Lepanto with the hope of regaining their lost territories in the Ionian Sea. Kemal Reis set sail from Cefalonia and re-took Lepanto from the Venetians. He stayed in Lepanto between April and May 1500, where his ships were repaired by an army of 15,000 Ottoman craftsmen brought from the area. From there, Kemal Reis set sail and bombarded the Venetian ports on the island of Corfu, and in August he once again defeated the Venetian fleet at the Battle of Modon. Kemal Reis bombarded the fortress of Modon from the sea and captured the town. He later engaged with the Venetian fleet off the coast of Coron and captured the town along with a Venetian brigantine. From there Kemal Reis sailed towards the Island of Sapientza (Sapienza) and sank the Venetian galley Lezza. In September, Kemal Reis assaulted Voiussa and in October he appeared at Cape Santa Maria on the Island of Lefkada, before ending the campaign and returning to Constantinople in November. With the Battle of Modon, the Turkish fleet and army quickly overwhelmed most of the Venetian possessions in Greece. Modon and Coron, the "two eyes of the Republic", were lost. Doge Agostino Barbarigo asked the Pope and the Catholic Monarchs for help, and on 24 December a Spanish–Venetian army commanded by Gonzalo de Córdoba took Cephalonia, temporarily stopping the Ottoman offensive on eastern Venetian territories.

=== 1501–1503 ===
Territorial changes of the war. Blue marks territories taken by Venice; purple by the Ottomans.

The Ottoman incursions in Dalmatia escalated to the point where Venice was forced to sign a treaty with Vladislaus II of Hungary and Pope Alexander VI by which they pledged 140,000 ducats a year for the Kingdom of Hungary to actively defend its southern Croatian territories, which aided the defence of Venetian Dalmatia, signed after long negotiations on 13 May 1501. In 1501 Feriz Beg captured Durazzo in Venetian Albania.

By the end of 1502, Venice and the Ottoman Empire agreed on an armistice. On 31 January 1503, Venice signed another treaty with Vladislaus II, having already paid 124,000 ducats through the previous treaty, to pay 30,000 ducats a year for the same purpose.

In 1503, Turkish cavalry raids reached Venetian territory in Northern Italy, and Venice was forced to recognize the Ottoman gains, ending the war.

The economy of the Venetian cities in Dalmatia was severely impacted by the Turkish occupation of the hinterland during this war.

== Aftermath ==
By September 1510, Vladislaus had received a total of 116,000 ducats under the terms of the second treaty with Venice. After 1508, he had also been under pressure from the League of Cambrai to join them against Venice, but skillful Venetian diplomacy prevented that.

== See also ==
- Ottoman Navy

== Sources ==
- Chasiotis, Ioannis (1974). "Πολεμικές συγκρούσεις στον ελληνικό χώρο και η συμμετοχή των Ελλήνων" [Conflicts in the Greek lands and the participation of the Greeks]. Ιστορία του Ελληνικού Έθνους, Τόμος Ι′: Ο ελληνισμός υπό ξένη κυριαρχία, 1453–1669 [History of the Greek Nation, Volume X: Hellenism under foreign rule, 1453–1669] (in Greek). Athens: Ekdotiki Athinon. pp. 252–323.
- Fisher, Sydney N. (1948). The Foreign Relations of Turkey, 1481-1512. University of Illinois Press.
- Goodwin, Godfrey (2013). The Janissaries. Saqi Essentials. ISBN 978-0-86356-781-0.
