= Battle of Karpathos =

1498 naval battle

Battle of Karpathos (1498)
Date	July 1498
Location	Karpathos, Aegean Sea
Result	Ottoman victory

Belligerents
Ottoman Empire	(Sovereign Military Order of Malta) Knights Hospitaller

Commanders and leaders
Kemal Reis	Nicolas Centurione (POW)

Strength
5 galleys	10 galleys

Casualties and losses
Light	1 ship sank 5 ships captured

The Battle of Karpathos was a battle in 1498 in which the Ottoman fleet under the command of Kemal Reis defeated the Knights Hospitaller fleet under the command of Nicolas Centurione, which blocked its way between Karpathos and Crete on its return from Egypt in July 1498.

== Background ==
The Ottoman Sultan Bayezid II, who implemented an active maritime policy, accelerated these efforts after the death of Cem Sultan. Bayezid II, who especially aimed to make substantial preparations against Venice, invited Kemal Reis to Istanbul in 1495 and allocated a significant budget to create a large fleet. In the same year, Kemal Reis made a show of strength in the Mediterranean with the navy he had expanded.

In 1498, Kemal Reis was assigned to transport the incomes of the foundations of the Haremeyn (Mecca and Medina) in Anatolia to Alexandria by sea, since the land route was not safe. This intended 13-piece (5 galleys, and 6 fusta Ottoman fleet reached Egypt at the beginning of June 1498 via the Aegean Sea-Eastern Mediterranean. If the Ottoman trade was harassed by the Knights Hospitaller off the coast of Crete, Kemal Reis warded off the harassment in order to risk the loss and avoid getting into trouble.

== Battle ==
The Ottoman fleet under the command of Kemal Reis was harassed again by the Knights Hospitaller on its way back in July. This time, the Ottoman navy, which had taken up battle formation to carry valuable cargo, attacked the Rhodian navy under the command of Nicolas Centurione (called "Sunturluoğlu" by the Ottomans). The Turkish navy, which sank the flagship and captured Centurione, also captured five Rhodian ships.

Kemal Reis made a triumphant entrance into Istanbul with the 5 Rhodian ships he captured and a large number of prisoners, and delivered the prisoners to the Sultan Bayezid II.
