= Battle of Modon (1500) =

Naval battle

Coordinates: 36.9000°N 21.6833°E

- Part of the Ottoman–Venetian War of 1499–1503
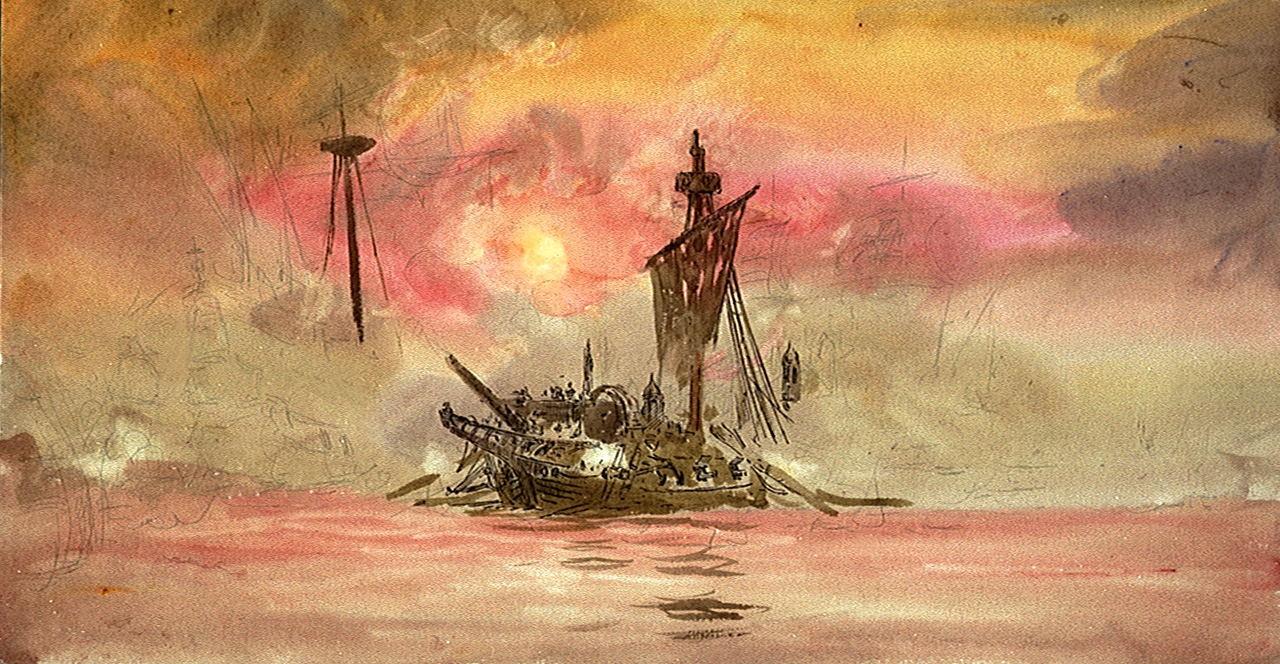
- Battle of Modon, by William Lionel Wyllie.
Date	July 20 – August 9, 1500
Location	Modon, Peloponnese
Result	Ottoman victory

Belligerents
Ottoman Empire	Republic of Venice

Commanders and leaders
Kemal Reis; Feriz Beg	Girolamo Contarini; Marco Gabriel

Strength
Modon: 30,000–60,000 soldiers Fleet: 92 galleys 20 carracks 136 fustas and brigantines	Modon: 7,000 soldiers Fleet: 46 galleys 20 carracks

Casualties and losses
5,000–6,000 dead 5 galleys sunk Several ships damaged	Most soldiers killed 2 galleys sunk Many ships damaged

The Battle of Modon, also known as the Second Battle of Lepanto, took place in August 1500 during the war of 1499–1503 between the Ottoman Empire and the Republic of Venice. The Ottomans, who had won the Battle of Zonchio (First Battle of Lepanto / Battle of Sapienza) the previous year, were again victorious under Admiral Kemal Reis.

== Background ==
In December 1499, the Venetians attacked Lepanto with the hope of regaining the territories which they lost with the Battle of Zonchio. Kemal Reis set sail from Cefalonia and retook Lepanto from the Venetians. He stayed in Lepanto between April and May 1500, where his ships were repaired by an army of 15,000 Ottoman craftsmen who were brought from the area.

From there Kemal Reis set sail and bombarded the Venetian ports on the island of Corfu. He then besieged the fortress of Modon from sea with a fleet of 220 ships. The Venetian fleet, although counting only 66 ships, headed south towards Modon in an attempt to relieve the place. It was originally led by captain general Melchiorre Trevisan, replacing Antonio Grimani from Zonchio, but Trevisan died of illness en route on July 17 and was replaced himself by Girolamo Contarini.

== Opposing forces ==
The Venetian fleet was in considerably worse shape than it had been in Zonchio, being affected by disease and confusing orders. Still, Contarini expected to make up for Zonchio through stronger leadership. His fleet was composed of 67 ships, counting 34 galleys, 13 great galleys and 20 carracks, half of the last being lightly armed ships coming from Syria. For its part, the Ottoman armada was composed of as many as 248 ships, counting 92 galleys, 20 carracks and 136 fustas and brigantines.

== Previous movements ==
On July 20, Kemal Reis started bombarding Modon to help the siege, while Contarini arrived on July 23. Placing his lighter galleys in his flanks, he formed a center made of carracks at the left and heavy galleys at the right. He planned to advance first with his heavy galleys, then with his carracks and finally with the rest of the fleet in a wedge. The Venetian armada was immediately opposed by the bulk of the Ottoman fleet coming out of their base in the gulf of Navarino, but only a long-range exchange of artillery happened before Contarini ordered to withdraw.

The following day, Contarini made open his intention to engage directly the Ottoman fleet, a battle plan which bewildered his subordinates given that the Ottoman fleet was believed to outnumber them three to one. Galley commander Marin Barbo also pointed out the enemy fleet was in much better shape and carried much more artillery, but was overruled. When the Ottoman fleet was coming out of the gulf, with the Venetian fleet placing its carracks at open sea and the galleys close to the coast, they realized the Ottoman armada was even bigger than they had feared. The Venetian heavy galleys tried to flee by the carracks' side, which encouraged the Ottomans to move, but Contarini managed to rally some of them and engage.

== Battle ==
The light and heavy galleys of the Venetian fleet successfully flanked Kemal's fleet before the latter could advance towards the sea in order to spread out and capitalize on its numbers. The Venetians fired their artillery, inflicting damage on the Ottoman fleet and breaking its formation. One of the Venetian galleys, led by Andrea Bodimer, faced the Ottoman flagship, heavily damaging each other. However, Turkish advantage in numbers imposed when their galleys started breaking the flanking and surrounding them. Four more Venetian galleys abandoned their own formation and fled, and another galley attempting to call them back was surrounded and sunk by the Turks. Contarini did his best to try to rally his fleet again, but his galley was crippled and forced him out of the action. The battle continued until nightfall, when the Venetian fleet was finally overpowered and Contarini ordered a retreat to Zante.

In Zante, Contarini was criticized by the other captains, being mainly accused of having forced the armada to go toe to toe with too large an enemy fleet. On August 9, Modon finally capitulated. Most of the men either died fighting to the last breath or were killed, while the women and children were taken and enslaved. Only some men in small boats managed to reach Zante to deliver the news.

== Aftermath ==
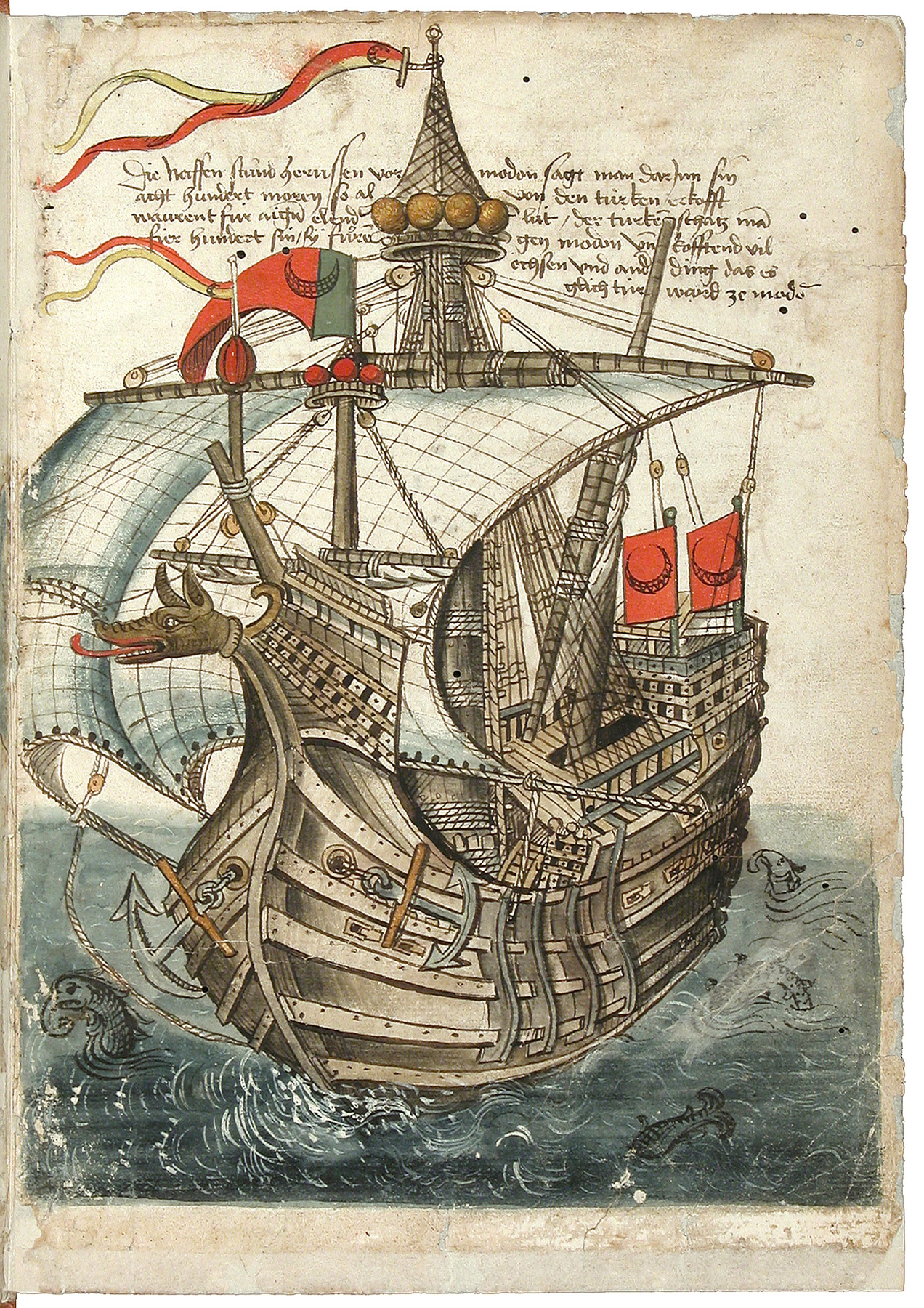
Ottoman carrack in 1480.

With the Battle of Modon, the Ottoman fleet and army quickly overwhelmed most of the Venetian possessions in Greece. On August 16, after a violent storm prevented the Venetian armada from trying another relief, Kemal Reis captured Coron along with a Venetian brigantine. From there he sailed towards the Island of Sapientza (Sapienza) and sank the Venetian galley Lezza.

In September Kemal assaulted Voiussa, and in October he appeared at Cape Santa Maria on the Island of Lefkada before ending the campaign and returning to Constantinople in November. Modon and Coron, the "two eyes of the Republic", were lost. Ottoman cavalry raids reached Venetian territory in northern Italy. With the exception of Cephalonia, which was recovered in 1500 with the help of Gonzalo Fernández de Córdoba, Venice suffered enough setbacks to seek peace in 1502, keeping Cephalonia but recognizing the rest of Ottoman gains.

== See also ==
- Ottoman Navy

== Bibliography ==
- John E. Dotson: Foundations of Venetian Naval Strategy from Pietro II Orseoto to the Battle of Zoncho, 1000-1500 (2001)
- Salvatore Bono: "Corsari nel Mediterraneo" (Corsairs in the Mediterranean), Oscar Storia Mondadori (Perugia, 1993)
- Marin Sanudo, Diarii, vol. 3, Rinaldo Fulin, 1880, pp. 448–727.
- Stanchev, Stefan (2025). Venice, the Ottomans, and the Sea (1381–1517). Oxford University Press. ISBN 9780192884435.
