= Kemal Reis =

Ottoman privateer and admiral

- Born: c. 1451; Manisa, Anatolia Eyalet, Ottoman Empire
- Died: 1511; Mediterranean Sea
- Military career
- Allegiance: Ottoman Empire
- Branch: Ottoman Navy
- Service years: c. 1470–1511
- Rank: Admiral
- Conflicts: Battle of Karpathos; Battle of Zonchio; Battle of Modon; Fall of Navarino (1501); Ottoman raid on the Balearic Islands (1501)

Kemal Reis (c. 1451 – 1511) was an Ottoman privateer and admiral. He was also the paternal uncle of the famous Ottoman admiral and cartographer Piri Reis, who accompanied him in most of his important naval expeditions.

== Background and early career ==
Kemal Reis was born in Manisa on the Aegean coast of the Ottoman Empire in c. 1451. His full name was Ahmed Kemaleddin (Ahmet Kemalettin). His ancestry is disputed; some sources claim that he was born into a Turkish family, while others claim he was born into a Greek family that converted to Islam. He became known in Europe, particularly in Italy and Spain, with names like Camali and Camalicchio.

=== Naval mission to Spain ===
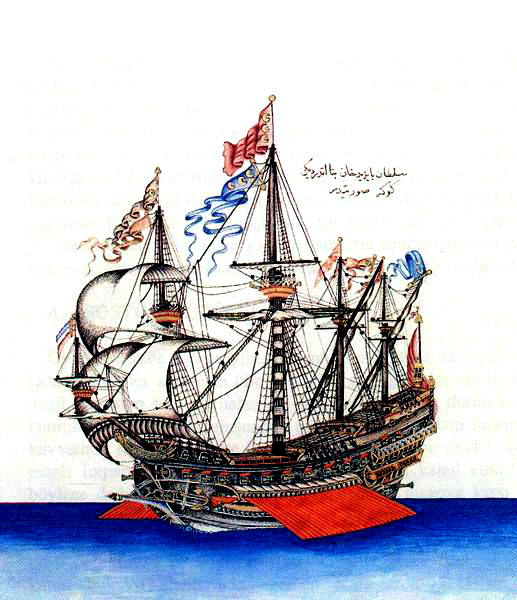
Göke (1495) was the flagship of Kemal Reis.

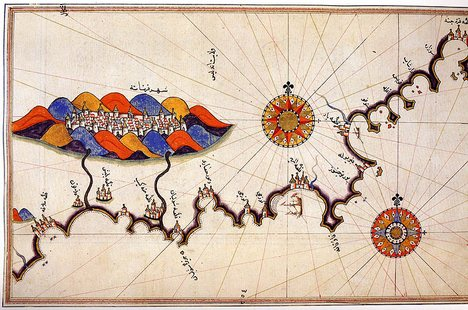
Map of Granada by the Ottoman cartographer Piri Reis, nephew of Kemal Reis, 15th century.

Kemal Reis started his career as the commander of the naval fleet belonging to the Sanjak Bey (Provincial Governor) of Eğriboz (present-day Euboea) which was under Ottoman control. In 1487 the Ottoman Sultan Bayezid II appointed Kemal Reis with the task of defending the lands of Emir Abu Abdullah, the ruler of Granada, which was then one of the final Muslim strongholds in Spain. Kemal Reis sailed to Spain and landed an expeditionary force of Ottoman troops at Málaga, capturing the city and the surrounding villages and taking many prisoners (see Granada War). From there he sailed to the Balearic Islands and Corsica, where he raided the coastal settlements, before landing his troops near Pisa in Italy. From Pisa he once again went to Andalucia and in several occasions between 1490 and 1492 transported the Muslims and Jews who wished to escape Spain to the provinces of the Ottoman Empire which welcomed them. The Muslims and Jews of Spain contributed much to the rising power of the Ottoman Empire by introducing new ideas, methods and craftsmanship. Kemal Reis continued to land his troops in Andalucia and tried to stop the Spanish advance by bombarding the ports of Elche, Almeria and Málaga.

== Admiral of the Ottoman Navy ==
In 1495 Kemal Reis was made an admiral of the Ottoman Navy by Sultan Bayezid II who ordered the construction of his large flagship, Göke, which could carry 700 soldiers and was armed with the strongest cannons of that period. Two large galleys of this type were built, one for Kemal Reis and the other for Burak Reis. In October 1496, with a force of 5 galleys, 5 fustas, a barque and a smaller ship, Kemal Reis set sail from Constantinople and raided the Gulf of Taranto. In January 1497 he landed at Modon and later captured several Venetian ships at the Ionian Sea and transported them, along with their cargo, to Euboea. In March 1497 Sultan Bayezid II appointed him with the task of protecting the ships which carried valuable goods belonging to the religious foundations of Mecca and Medina from the frequent raids of the Knights of St. John who were based in the island of Rhodes at that time (in 1522 the Ottomans captured Rhodes and allowed the Knights of St. John to peacefully leave the island, who first relocated their base to Sicily and later to Malta in 1530.) Kemal Reis set sail towards Rhodes with a force of 2 barques and 3 fustas, and captured a barque of the knights near Montestrato. He later landed at Stalimene (Lemnos) and from there sailed towards Tenedos (Bozcaada) and returned to Constantinople. In June 1497 he was given two more large galleys and in July 1497 he made the island of Chios his base for operations in the Aegean Sea against the Venetians and the Knights of St. John. In April 1498, commanding a fleet of 6 galleys, 12 fustas with large cannons, 4 barques and 4 smaller types of ships, he set sail from the Dardanelles and headed south towards the Aegean islands that were controlled by the Republic of Venice. In June 1498 he appeared in the island of Paros and later sailed towards Crete where he landed his troops at Sitia and captured the town along with the nearby villages before sending his Scout forces to examine the characteristics of the nearby Venetian castle. In July 1498 he sailed to Rosetta (Rashid) in Egypt with a force of 5 galleys, 6 fustas and 2 barques for transporting 300 Muslim pilgrims heading for Mecca, who also had with them 400,000 gold ducats which were sent to the Mamluk sultan by Bayezid II. Near the port of Abu Kabir he captured 2 Portuguese ships (one galleon and one barque) after fierce fighting which lasted 2 days. From there Kemal Reis sailed towards Santorini and captured a Venetian barque, before capturing another Portuguese ship in the Aegean Sea.

== Ottoman-Venetian Wars ==
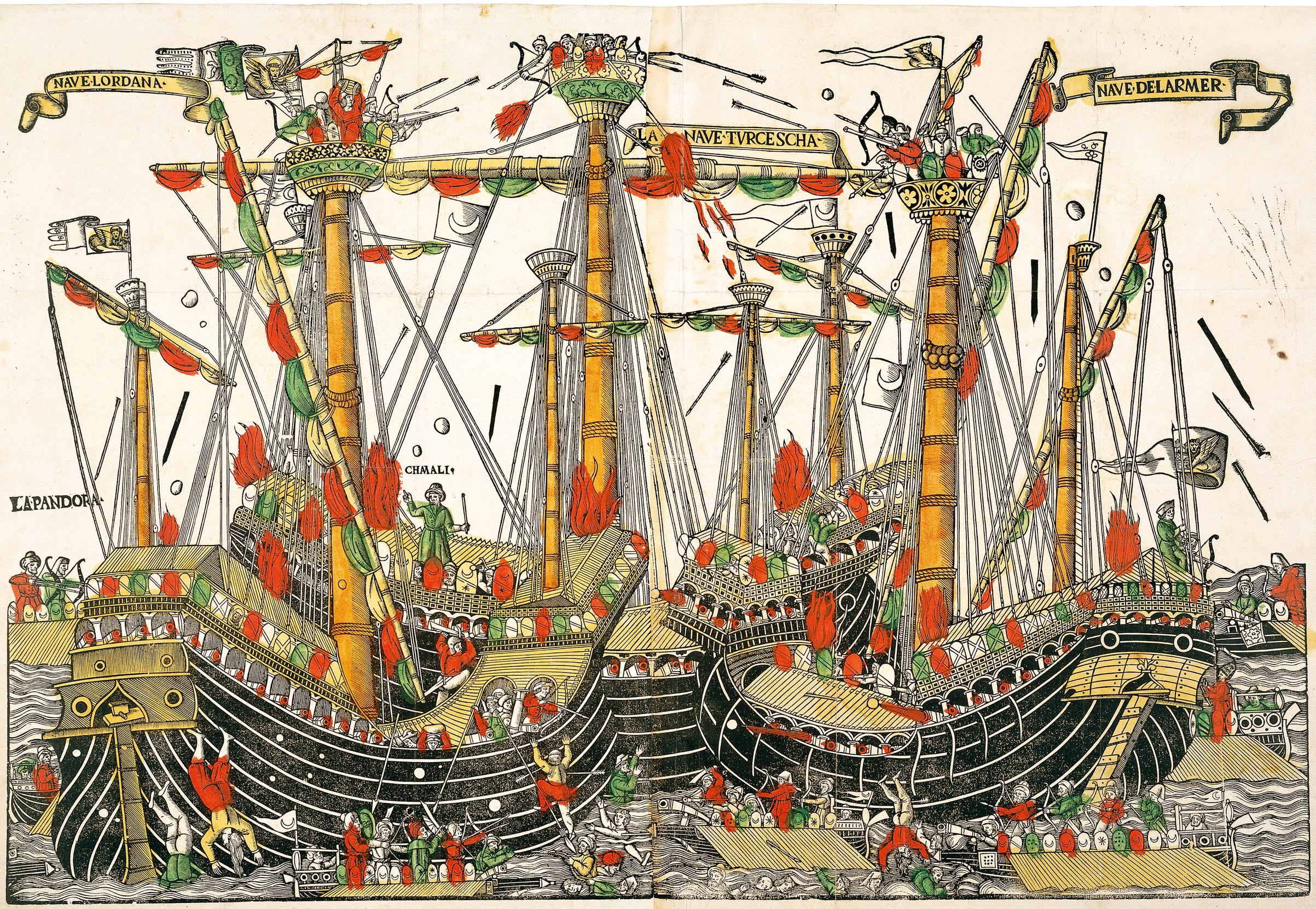
Battle of Zonchio (1499)

In January 1499 Kemal Reis set sail from Constantinople with a force of 10 galleys and 4 other types of ships, and in July 1499 met with the huge Ottoman fleet which was sent to him by Davud Pasha and took over its command in order to wage a large scale war against the Republic of Venice. The Ottoman fleet consisted of 67 galleys, 20 galliots and circa 200 smaller vessels. In August 1499 Kemal Reis defeated the Venetian fleet under the command of Antonio Grimani at the Battle of Zonchio which is also known as the Battle of Sapienza of 1499 or the First Battle of Lepanto and was a part of the Ottoman-Venetian Wars of 1499–1503. It was the first naval battle in history with cannons used on ships, and took place on four separate days: on August 12, 20, 22 and 25, 1499. After reaching the Ionian Sea with the large Ottoman fleet, Kemal Reis encountered the Venetian fleet of 47 galleys, 17 galliots and circa 100 smaller vessels under the command of Antonio Grimani near Cape Zonchio and won an important victory. During the battle Kemal Reis sank the galley of Andrea Loredan, a member of the influential Loredan family of Venice. Antonio Grimani was arrested on September 29 but was eventually released. Grimani later became the Doge of Venice in 1521. The Ottoman Sultan Bayezid II gifted 10 of the captured Venetian galleys to Kemal Reis, who stationed his fleet at the island of Cefalonia between October and December, 1499.

In December 1499 the Venetians attacked Lepanto with the hope of regaining their lost territories in the Ionian Sea. Kemal Reis set sail from Cefalonia and retook Lepanto from the Venetians. He stayed in Lepanto in April and May 1500, where his ships were repaired by an army of 15,000 Ottoman craftsmen brought from the area. From there Kemal Reis set sail and bombarded the Venetian ports on the island of Corfu, and in August 1500 he once again defeated the Venetian fleet at the Battle of Modon which is also known as the Second Battle of Lepanto. Kemal Reis bombarded the fortress of Modon from the sea and captured the town. He later engaged with the Venetian fleet off the coast of Coron and captured the town along with a Venetian brigantine. From there Kemal Reis sailed towards the Island of Sapientza (Sapienza) and sank the Venetian galley "Lezza". In September 1500 Kemal Reis assaulted Voiussa and in October he appeared at Cape Santa Maria on the Island of Lefkada before ending the campaign and returning to Istanbul in November. With the Battle of Modon, the Ottoman fleet and army quickly overwhelmed most of the Venetian possessions in Greece. Modon and Coron, the "two eyes of the Republic", were lost. Ottoman cavalry raids reached Venetian territory in northern Italy, and, in 1503, Venice again had to seek peace, recognizing the Ottoman's gains.

In January 1501 Kemal Reis set sail from Constantinople with a fleet of 36 galleys and fustas. In February 1501 he landed at the Island of Euboea and at Nafplion before heading towards Corfu in March and from there to the Tyrrhenian Sea where he captured the Island of Pianosa along with many prisoners. In April 1501 with a fleet of 60 ships he landed at Nafplion and Monemvasia, causing the Venetian regional commander based at Corfu to call back the Venetian ships heading towards Lebanon and the Levant in order to strengthen the defenses of the Repubblica Serenissima's remaining strongholds on Morea. In May 1501, with a force of 8 galliots and 13 fustas, he escorted the cargo ships carrying construction material for strengthening the Ottoman fortresses on the islands of Chios and Tinos, where he captured the galley of Girolamo Pisani, the local Venetian commander, including the official standard of San Marco (St. Mark, the patron saint of Venice) along with another Venetian galley named "Basadonna". From there he sailed to the port of Zonchio, near Navarino, with a force of 5 galliots and 14 fustas. The Ottoman forces landed there and captured the Venetian castle and the nearby settlements after a siege which lasted less than 10 hours. Kemal Reis also captured 3 Venetian galleys, a Venetian caravelle and several other local ships which were docked at the port of Zonchio. He took these ships first to Modon and later to the Island of Aegina, before sailing towards Euboea. He later captured Navarino from the Venetians, adding another important port to the Ottoman Empire. In June 1501 Kemal Reis sailed to the Adriatic Sea and strengthened the Ottoman defenses at Voiussa and Vlorë.

== Operations in the West Mediterranean and the Atlantic Ocean ==
In July 1501 Kemal Reis, accompanied by his nephew Piri Reis, set sail from the port of Modon with a force of 3 galleys and 16 fustas and went to the Tyrrhenian Sea, where he took advantage of the war between Jacopo d'Appiano, ruler of Piombino, and the Papal forces under the command of Cesare Borgia. The Ottoman troops landed on the Island of Pianosa and quickly captured it, taking many prisoners. From there Kemal Reis sailed to the Channel of Piombino and the Ottomans raided the coastal settlements in that area. In August 1501 Kemal Reis and his troops landed at Sardinia and captured several coastal settlements while taking around 1,050 prisoners during fights against the local forces. He engaged several Genoese warships off the coast of Sardinia, which later escaped northwards after being damaged by cannon fire. Still in August 1501 Kemal Reis sailed to the Balearic Islands and the Ottomans landed at Mallorca, where bitter fighting against the local Spanish forces took place. From there Kemal Reis sailed to Spain and captured 7 Spanish ships off the coast of Valencia. Aboard these ships he found a strange feather headdress and an unfamiliar black stone. He was told by one of his prisoners that both came from newly discovered lands to the west, beyond the Atlantic Ocean. The prisoner claimed to have visited these lands three times, under the command of a man named Colombo, and that he had in his possession a chart, drawn by this Colombo himself, which showed the newly discovered lands beyond the Sea of Darkness. This map was to become one of the main source charts of the famous Piri Reis map of 1513 which was drawn by the Ottoman admiral and cartographer Piri Reis who was the nephew of Kemal Reis.

After leaving Valencia, still in August 1501, Kemal Reis headed south and bombarded the coastal defenses of Andalucia before landing his troops, where the Ottomans raided several ports and towns. Kemal Reis later sailed westwards and passed the Strait of Gibraltar and entered the Atlantic Ocean, where he and his men raided the Atlantic coasts of the Iberian Peninsula. From there Kemal Reis sailed southwest and landed on several of the Canary Islands, where the Ottomans faced moderate opposition from the Spanish forces. Piri Reis used the occasion, as in other voyages with his uncle, to draw his famous portolan charts which were later to become a part of the renowned Kitab-ı Bahriye (Book of Navigation). Kemal Reis later turned eastwards, where he followed the Atlantic coastline of Morocco and re-entered the Mediterranean Sea through the Strait of Gibraltar, landing on several ports of Morocco and Algeria on the way. From there Kemal Reis headed further east and captured several Genoese ships off the coast of Tripoli in Libya. He also intercepted several Venetian galleys in the area before sailing back to Constantinople.

== Return to the East Mediterranean ==
In May 1502 Kemal Reis set sail from Istanbul with a fleet of 50 ships and headed towards Euboea. In June 1502 he captured the Island of Kos along with the Castle of San Pietro which belonged to the Knights of St. John. From there he sailed to Nafplion and bombarded its port until being called for assisting the defense of Mytilene which was sieged by a joint Venetian-French fleet. In July 1502 he landed his forces on Lesbos and fought against the French soldiers in Mytilene which the Ottomans had earlier taken from the Genoese in 1462. In August 1502 Kemal Reis made the Island of Lefkada his new base for operations in the Ionian and Adriatic Seas, where he raided the coastal settlements belonging to the Republic of Venice and the Republic of Ragusa, capturing several of them on behalf of the Ottoman Empire. However, the strategic importance of the Island of Santa Maura (as the Venetians called Lefkada) prompted the Repubblica Serenissima to organize a huge fleet under the command of Benedetto Pesaro, which consisted of 50 galleys and numerous other smaller ships. The Venetians were joined by 13 Papal galleys under the command of Giacomo Pesaro, the brother of Benedetto who was the Bishop of Paphos, as well as 3 galleys belonging to the Knights of St. John in Rhodes and 4 French galleys under the command of the Prégent de Bidoux. Overwhelmed by the size of the enemy fleet, Kemal Reis was forced to abandon Lefkada and sailed back first to Gallipoli and later to Constantinople, where, in October 1502, he ordered the construction of new ships at the Imperial Naval Arsenal of the Golden Horn.

In March 1503 Kemal Reis set sail from Constantinople with his new ships and reached Gallipoli where he took over the command of the Ottoman fleet that was based there. However, he contracted a severe illness and had to return to Constantinople for treatment, which lasted a long time and caused him to remain inactive between November 1503 and March 1505.

In March 1505 Kemal Reis was appointed with the task of intercepting the Knights of St. John in Rhodes who had caused serious damage on Ottoman shipping routes off the coasts of Anatolia, and he set sail from Gallipoli with a force of 3 galleys and 17 fustas, heading first towards the Island of Kos, which he had earlier captured from the Knights, with the aim of organizing an assault on their base in nearby Rhodes. In May 1505 Kemal Reis assaulted the coasts of Rhodes and landed a large number of Ottoman troops on the island, where they bombarded the castle of the Knights from land and took control of several settlements. From there Kemal Reis sailed to the islands of Tilos and Nisyros where he bombarded the fortresses of the Knights from the sea. Still in May 1505 Kemal Reis captured the Island of Lemnos and assaulted the Island of Chios, before returning to Modon in July 1505.

== Return to the West Mediterranean and Spain ==
In September 1505 Kemal Reis assaulted Sicily and captured 3 ships (one from the Republic of Ragusa, the other two from Sicily) off the Sicilian coast.

In January 1506 he made the Island of Djerba his new base and sailed to Spain, where he once again landed at the coasts of Andalucia and bombarded the ports of Almeria and Málaga. He also transported Muslims and Jews and took them to Constantinople.

In May 1506 Kemal Reis, commanding a force of 8 galliots and fustas, returned to the Aegean Sea, and in June 1506 landed at the Island of Leros with a force of 500 janissaries. There he assaulted the Venetian castle under the command of Paolo Simeoni. Throughout June 1506 he raided the Dodecanese Islands before sailing back to the West Mediterranean with a fleet of 22 ships (including 3 large galleys and 11 fustas) where he landed on Sicily and assaulted the coastal settlements. There he was confronted by the forces of the Viceroy of Sicily who was an ally of Spain. In September 1506 Kemal Reis confronted a Spanish fleet for defending Djerba and captured a Spanish galley during combat. In October 1506 he landed at Trapani in Sicily and burned the Genoese ships at the port, whose crewmen were however released because they had no experience of naval warfare and were not deemed useful. He later bombarded the Venetian galley under the command of Benedetto Priuli. He responded to the cannon fire from the fortress of Trapani with the cannons on his ships. He later sailed to the Island of Cerigo in the Ionian Sea with a force of 3 galleys and 2 fustas, and exchanged fire with the Venetian fleet under the command of Girolamo Contarini. He later sailed back to Constantinople.

== Later operations in the East Mediterranean ==
In January 1507 Kemal Reis was appointed by Bayezid II with the task of hunting the Knights of St. John and set sail from Gallipoli with a large fleet of 15 galleys and 25 fustas that were heavily armed with cannons. He engaged with the Knights in several occasions until August 1507, when he returned to Constantinople. In August 1507 he sailed to Alexandria with a cargo of 8,000 sets of oars and 50 cannons that were donated to the Mamluk sultan by Bayezid II for helping him in his fight against the Portuguese fleet which often ventured into the Red Sea and damaged Mameluke interests. Kemal Reis stayed in Egypt until February 1508, and was back in Constantinople in May 1508, where he personally coordinated the reparation and modification of his ships at the Imperial Naval Arsenal of the Golden Horn before setting sail once again towards the Aegean Sea for confronting the Venetians and the Knights of St. John. In August 1508 he arrived at Euboea with 2 galleys, 3 barques and numerous fustas. From there he sailed to Tenedos where he repulsed an attack of the Knights and sank a ship near the port of Sizia. In November 1508 he captured a Genoese galleass from Savona off the island of Tenedos. In January 1509, commanding a force of 13 ships, he assaulted the Castle of Coo near Rhodes which belonged to the Knights of St. John. In February 1509, accompanied by the Ottoman privateer Kurtoğlu Muslihiddin Reis (known as Curtogoli in the West) and commanding a larger fleet of 20 ships (4 galleys, 1 galleass, 2 galliots, 3 barques and 10 fustas) he assaulted the City of Rhodes and landed a large number of janissaries at the port. In only a few days 4 large assaults are made on the Castle of Rhodes as well as the walls of the citadel that surrounds the city. Towards mid February, in command of 3 galleys and 3 fustas, he chased the ships belonging to Knights that were escaping Rhodes for the safety of nearby islands, and captured 3 galleons and 9 other types of ships.

== Final missions and death ==
Still in 1509 Kemal Reis sailed to the Tyrrhenian Sea and landed at the coasts of Liguria. He continued operating in the West Mediterranean for some time, until returning to Gallipoli. In September 1510 he set sail from Gallipoli with 2 galleys, 1 galliot and several fustas, and joined the Ottoman fleet of cargo ships in Constantinople which were heading to Alexandria and carried wood for building ships, sets of oars and cannons that were sent to the Mamluks for their fight against the Portuguese in the Indian Ocean. The cargo fleet that Kemal Reis was to escort amounted to a total of 40 ships, 8 of which were galleys.

In early 1511, after passing the lands of the Duchy of Naxos and being sighted for the last time in December 1510, 27 ships of the Ottoman cargo fleet were wrecked by a severe storm in the Mediterranean Sea, including the ship of Kemal Reis, who died with his men. According to the Venetian Marino Sanudo (I Diarii, vol. 11, 663), the news of his death reached Edirne on 8 November 1511.

== Legacy ==
Several warships of the Turkish Navy have been named after Kemal Reis.

Piri Reis wrote this poem for his uncle, from whom he learned so much about the Ottoman Navy, in the opening section of his famous Kitab-ı Bahriye (Book of Navigation):

Good friend, I want you

To remember us in your prayers,

And remember Kemal Reis, our master,

May his soul be content!

He had perfect knowledge of the seas

And knew the science of navigation.

He knew innumerable seas;

No one could stop him...

We sailed the Mediterranean together

And saw all its great cities.

We went to Frankish lands

And defeated the infidel.

One day an order from

Sultan Bayezid arrived.

"Tell Kemal Reis to come to me,"

It said, "and advise me on affairs of the sea."

So in 1495, the year of this command,

We returned to our country.

By the sultan's command we set out

Kemal Reis sailed hoping to come back,

But was lost at sea.

Everyone once spoke of him;

Now even his name is forgotten...

The angel of death caught him

While he was serving Sultan Bayezid.

May Allah give peace to those

Who remember Kemal Reis with a prayer.

Kemal died and went to the next world

And we found ourselves alone in this.

== See also ==
- Ottoman Navy

== Sources ==
- Frederic C. Lane, Venice, A Maritime Republic (Baltimore, 1973)
- Paul Lunde, Piri Reis and the Columbus Map (1992)
- E. Hamilton Currey, Sea-Wolves of the Mediterranean, London, 1910
- Bono, Salvatore: Corsari nel Mediterraneo (Corsairs in the Mediterranean), Oscar Storia Mondadori. Perugia, 1993.
- Corsari nel Mediterraneo: Condottieri di ventura. Online database in Italian, based on Salvatore Bono's book.
- Bradford, Ernle, The Sultan's Admiral: The life of Barbarossa, London, 1968.
- Wolf, John B., The Barbary Coast: Algeria under the Turks, New York, 1979; ISBN 0-393-01205-0
- The Ottomans: Comprehensive and detailed online chronology of Ottoman history in English.
- Comprehensive and detailed online chronology of Ottoman history in Turkish.
- Turkish Navy official website: Historic heritage of the Turkish Navy (in Turkish)
