= List of admirals in the Ottoman Empire =

These Admirals of the Ottoman Empire are senior naval officers (Ottoman Turkish: reis or reis pasha) of the Ottoman Empire other than the Kapudan Pashas who were the Grand Admirals of the Ottoman fleet.

- Kemal Reis (c. 1451–1511)
- Piri Reis (1465/70–1553)
- Oruç Reis (c. 1474–1518)
- Turgut Reis (1485–23 June 1565)
- Seydi Ali Reis (1498–1563)
- Kurtoğlu Hızır Reis (16th century)
- Aydın Reis (died 1535)
- Murat Reis (c. 1534–1609)
- Ebubekir Pasha (1670–1757/1758)
- Hasan Rami Pasha (1842–1923)
- Ismail Al Jalili (1865–1943)

== See also ==
- Kapudan Pasha
- List of Kapudan Pashas
