= Cape Zonchio =

Cape in Messenia, Greece

Coordinates: 36°57′29″N 21°39′26″E

Cape Zonchio is the name given by the Venetian cartographers to the cape north of Pylos (Navarino) (called Zonklon or Zonchio in Venetian) on the western coast of Messenia on the Ionian Sea, in present-day Greece. In antiquity, it was known as Coryphasium (Ancient Greek: Κορυφάσιον).

== Geography ==
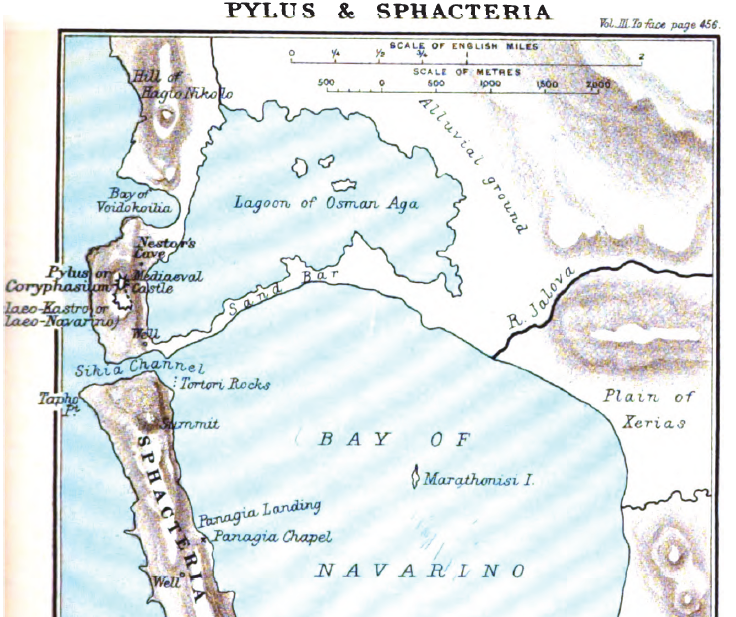
Map showing Coryphasium

The headland that is Cape Zonchio, is just north of the island of Sphacteria (Sfaktiria in modern Greek), to the northwest of Navarino Bay (Ormos Navarinou in modern Greek). On the eastern side of Coryphasium is the Lagoon of Osman Aga (Limín Dhivári). To the south is Sikia Channel, 220 feet wide and only 18 inches deep, separating Cape Zonchio from Sphacteria. To the west is the Ionian Sea, and to the north it is connected to the mainland by a sand spit on the eastern side of Voidokoilia Bay.

== History ==
The Venetians had a fortress (castle) on the headland built upon an ancient Greek fortress, it is known as Palaiokastron. The naval Battle of Zonchio took place off of Cape Zonchio from 12 to 25 August 1499.
