= Prégent de Bidoux =

French admiral

Prégent (or Prégeant) de Bidoux (French pronunciation: [pʁeʒɑ̃ də bidu]; c. 1468 – 1528), also known as Peri Joan (Occitan for 'Prester John') or Perrianni, was a French admiral.

Bidoux was born in Gascony around 1468. He was active during the Italian Wars of the early 16th century, fighting against the Turks in 1501 and the Venetians in 1510. He was involved in a conflict against England and defeated Admiral Edward Howard in battle near Brest on 25 April 1513. Bidoux raided Sussex in 1514, burning Brighton, but was wounded by an arrow. In 1518, Bidoux joined the Knights Hospitaller based on Rhodes and fought against Suleiman the Magnificent in 1522.

Bidoux died in Marseille in 1528.
