= House of Loredan-Santo Stefano =

Venetian Noble Lineage

- Noble House
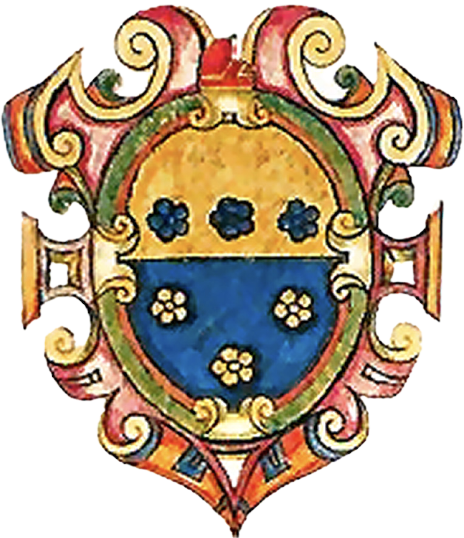
- Coat of Arms of the House of Loredan
- Parent family: House of Loredan
- Country: Republic of Venice; Holy Roman Empire
- Earlier spellings: San Vitale
- Etymology: from Campo Santo Stefano
- Origin: Veneto
- Founded: 14th century
- Founder: Gerolamo Loredan di S. Vitale
- Final ruler: Francesco Loredan
- Final head: Andrea di Girolamo Loredan
- Titles: Doge of Venice; Dogaressa of Venice; Procurator of St. Mark; Lord of Barban and Rakalj and others
- Style: "His Serenity"
- Members: Leonardo Loredan; Francesco Loredan; Caterina Loredan; Francesco Loredan
- Distinctions: Golden Rose
- Traditions: Roman Catholicism
- Motto: NON NOBIS DOMINE ("Praise us not, O Lord.")
- Estates: Barban and Rakalj, Istria
- Properties: Palazzo Loredan in Campo S. Stefano; Ca' Loredan Vendramin Calergi
- Dissolution: 1767

The House of Loredan-Santo Stefano was a cadet branch of the House of Loredan that existed from the 14th century until 1767. The branch was mainly settled in the Palazzo Loredan in Campo Santo Stefano, which they acquired in 1536 from the Mocenigo family. The progenitor of the branch is considered to be Gerolamo Loredan "dal Barbaro" di S. Vitale (d.~1474), father of Doge Leonardo Loredan and Dogaressa Caterina Loredan. Besides Leonardo, the branch also gave Doge Francesco Loredan.

== History ==
The progenitor of the family is considered to be Gerolamo Loredan di S. Vitale (d.~1474), known as "dal Barbaro", who served as the podestà of Padua. He married Donata Donà di Natale and their children were Doge Leonardo Loredan and Dogaressa Caterina Loredan, as well as Pietro Loredan (1466-1510), of poor health and unstable character, who studied alchemy in Padua and was disinterested in politics. In the will drawn up in February 1474 in Padua where he was podestà, the father designated Leonardo as the executor of the will and the sole heir of the estate and granted Pietro an annual annuity of 250 ducats. Their sister, Caterina Loredan, who later became Dogaressa of Venice by marriage to Doge Antonio Grimani, was described in a book by Edgcumbe Staley: “The Loredanian tradition for patriotism and nobility was handed on in the gracious personage of Dogaressa Caterina Loredan, sister of Doge Leonardo Loredan – the Consort of his successor Doge Antonio Grimani.”

In 1461, Leonardo Loredan married Giustina Giustiniani, of the wealthy branch of S. Moisè, with whom he had nine children: Lorenzo (who became Procurator of St. Mark's), Girolamo (the only one to continue the branch), Alvise, Vincenzo (died in Tripoli in 1499), Bernardo, Donata, Maria (wife of Giovanni Venier, of the branch that gave birth to Doge Francesco Venier), Paola (wife of Giovanni Alvise Venier, descendant of Doge Antonio Venier), and Elisabetta.

The main line of the branch of Santo Stefano ended in 1750 with Andrea di Girolamo Loredan, who died young in 1750, and the branch became extinct in 1767 with the death of Giovanni Loredan, brother of Doge Francesco.

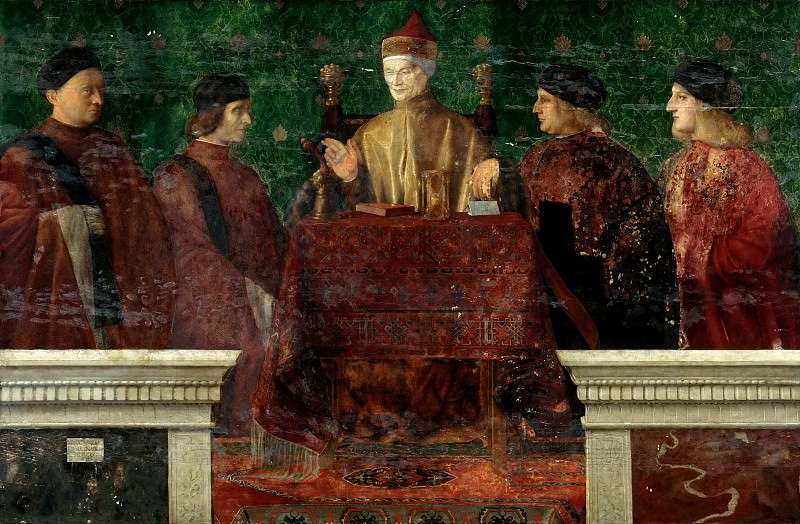
Doge Leonardo Loredan with Four Sons, by Giovanni Bellini, 1507, Gemäldegalerie, Berlin

== Genealogy ==
House of Loredan-Santo Stefano (Genealogy)

Nicolò Loredan
Gerolamo Loredan (d. 1474)	Donata Donà
Antonio Grimani (1434-1523)	Caterina Loredan	Leonardo Loredan (1436-1521)	Giustina Giustiniani (d. 1500)	Pietro Loredan (1466-1510)
Domenico Grimani (1461-1523)	Lorenzo Loredan (1462-1534)	Girolamo Loredan (1468-1532)	Alvise Loredan (1472-1521)	Bernardo Loredan (1481-1519)	Vincenzo Loredan (d. 1499)	Donata Loredan	Maria Loredan	Giovanni Venier	Paola Loredan	Elisabetta Loredan
Carlo Contarini (1580-1656)	Paolina Loredan	Francesco Venier (1489-1556)
Francesco Loredan	Francesca Barbarigo
Leonardo Loredan (d. 1675)	Alba Soranzo
Francesco Loredan (1656-1715)	Giovanni Loredan (1662-1725)	Andrea Loredan (1664-1704)	Caterina Grimani	Francesca Loredan	Elisabetta Loredan	Maria Loredan	Maddalena Loredan	Paolina Loredan
Francesco Loredan (1685-1762)	Girolamo Loredan	Caterina Cornaro	Giovanni Loredan (d. 1767)	Anna Maria Vendramin	Francesco Loredan	Antonio Loredan	Antonio Loredan	Leonardo Loredan	Leonardo Loredan	Girolamo Loredan	Contarina Loredan	Giovanni Tommaso Mocenigo	Alba Loredan
Andrea Loredan (d. 1750)	Caterina Loredan

Note: The branch of Santo Stefano is also known as the branch of San Vidal (San Vitale).

Note: There are some generations missing between Girolamo Loredan (1468-1532) and Francesco Loredan (17th century).

Note: Giustina Giustiniani (d. 1500), the wife of Doge Leonardo Loredan (1436-1521), is also known as Morosina Giustiniani.

Note: Caterina Loredan, Dogaressa of Venice, is featured in the family tree as the daughter of Gerolamo Loredan (d. 1474) and Donata Donà because, in some sources, she is mentioned as the sister of Doge Leonardo Loredan (1436-1521), although she may have been a daughter of Domenico Loredan.

Interestingly, near the Palazzo Contarini-Sceriman and the nearby bridge, Leonardo Loredan (d. 1675) was found dead in a boat. The unexplained death was the source of many rumors, claiming accidental death, murder by relatives, or murder by the Inquisitors of the Republic.

Andrea Loredan (d. 1750) died young, thus ending the male (agnatic) line of the branch of Santo Stefano.

== Istria ==
=== Barban and Rakalj ===
On the 23rd of December, 1535, the Loredan family acquired the town of Barban in Istria (today part of Croatia) for 14,760 ducats, and ownership was held by the brothers Leonardo, Lorenzo and Francesco, of the Santo Stefano branch. At the time, Barban also included Rakalj, and the two territories were organized as a separate feud owned by the Loredan family, who owned it until the abolition of feudal rights in 1869.

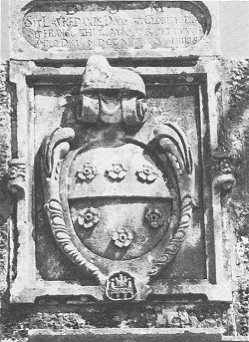
Loredan coat of arms in Barban

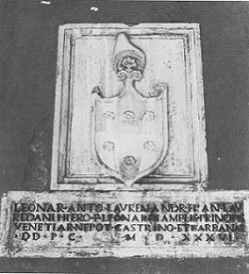
Loredan coat of arms in Barban

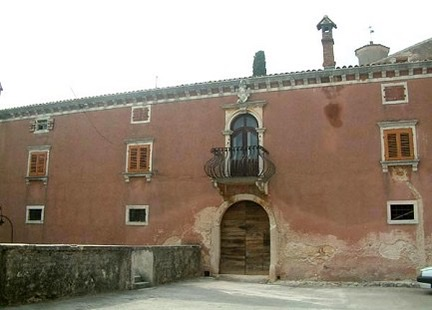
Loredan Palace in Barban

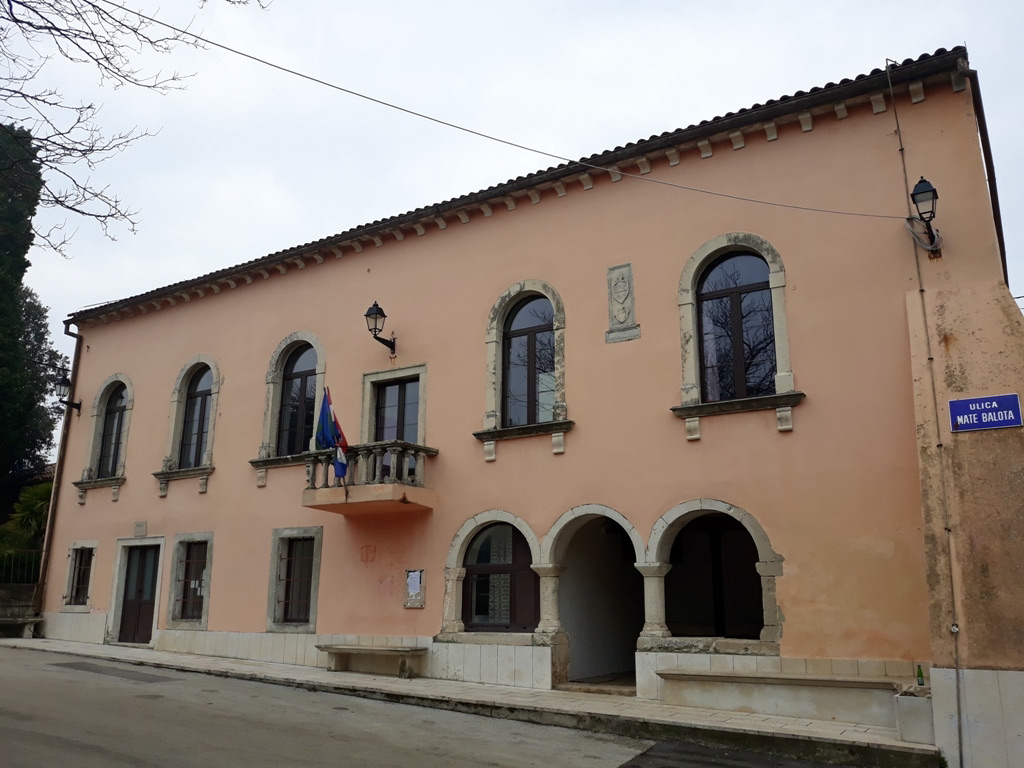
Loredan Palace in Rakalj

==== The Loredan Terminations ====
“The Loredan Terminations” were written orders of the Loredan family. They were created for the purpose of communication between the masters who were in Venice and the family representatives in Istria. From them we can learn about the internal structure of the feud. The captain had political and judicial power, and was appointed by the Loredans. He had to reside permanently on the estate and participate in the election of prefects, deputy prefects and other officials. He had a chancellor who recorded all the documents in special books, and he also took care of the distribution of grain. Twelve judges, the prefect and the deputy prefect took care of the supply, solved smaller disputes and imposed lesser sentences. Church and fraternal goods were managed by the gastald and the municipal money was collected by the chamberlain.

The Terminations are kept in the Croatian State Archives in Rijeka.

== Palazzo Loredan in Campo Santo Stefano ==
Palazzo Loredan in Campo Santo Stefano, where the branch was settled, is a palace in the San Marco district of Venice, overlooking Campo Santo Stefano.

Before the acquisition by the Loredan family in 1536 and the restoration by the architect Antonio Abbondi, it was a group of adjacent buildings, in the Gothic style, belonging to the Mocenigo family. The purchased buildings were substantially restored and made into a single building for the residence of the Loredan family.

After the fall of the Republic of Venice, a Loredan heir sold the building to a businessman around 1802–1805.

Today, the palace is the seat of the Venetian Institute of Science, Literature and Arts and it houses the Panteon Veneto, a collection of sculptures of great Venetians.

== Family in art ==
=== In painting ===
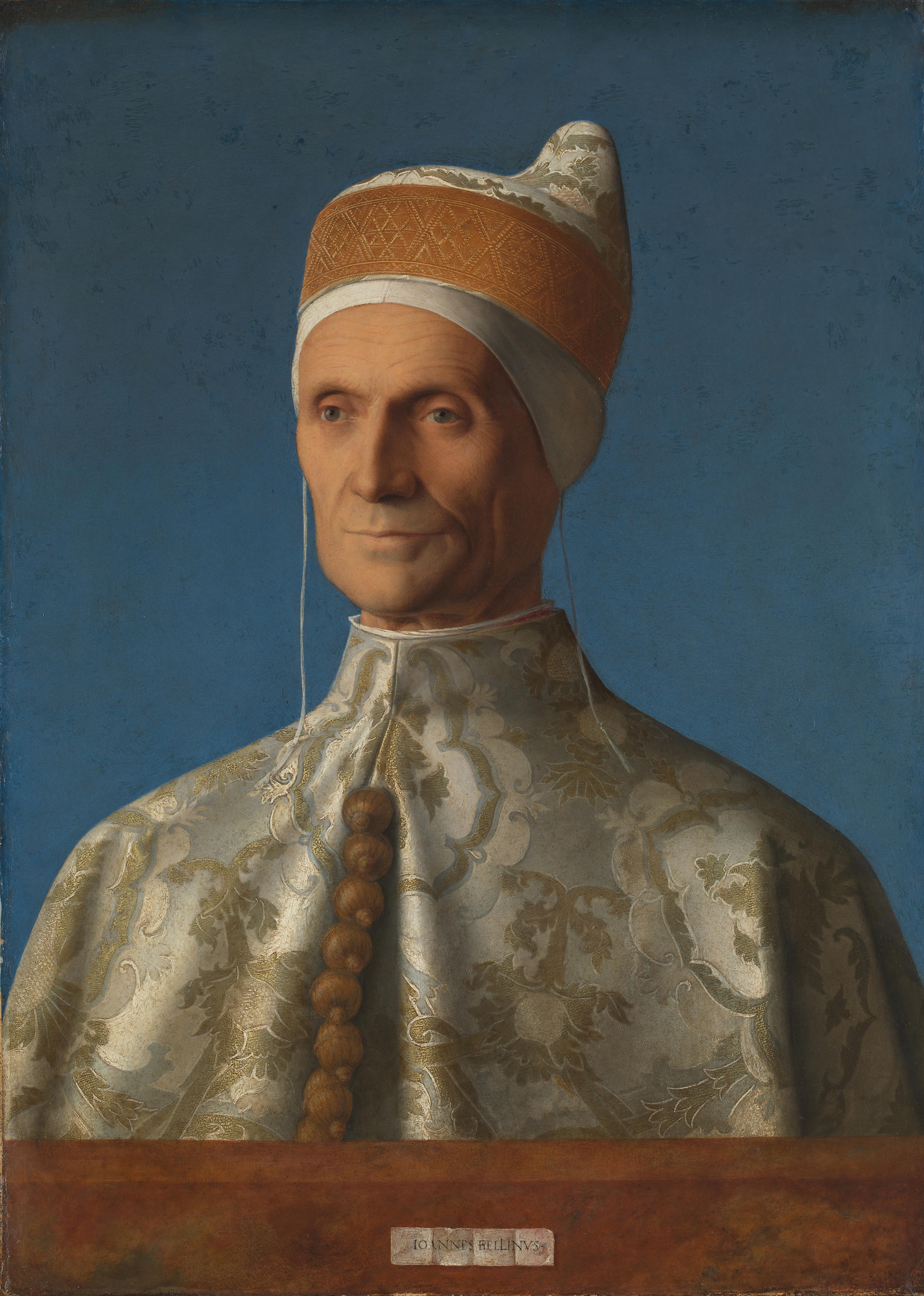
Portrait of Doge Leonardo Loredan, by Giovanni Bellini, 1501, National Gallery, London

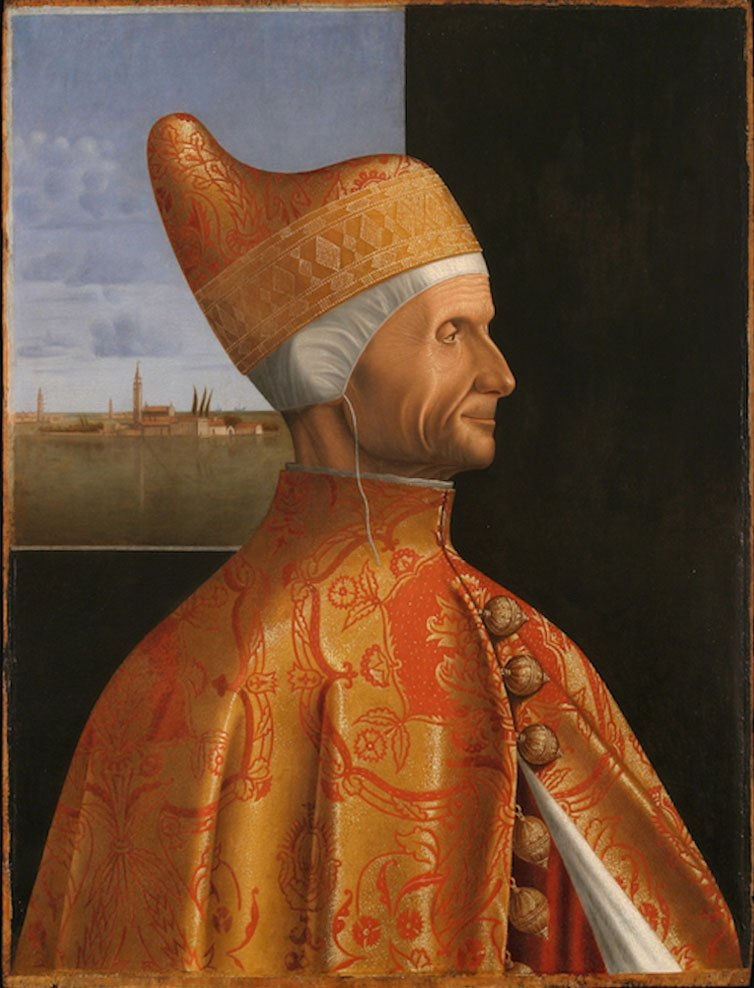
Portrait of Doge Leonardo Loredan, by Vittore Carpaccio, 1501, Museo Correr, Venice

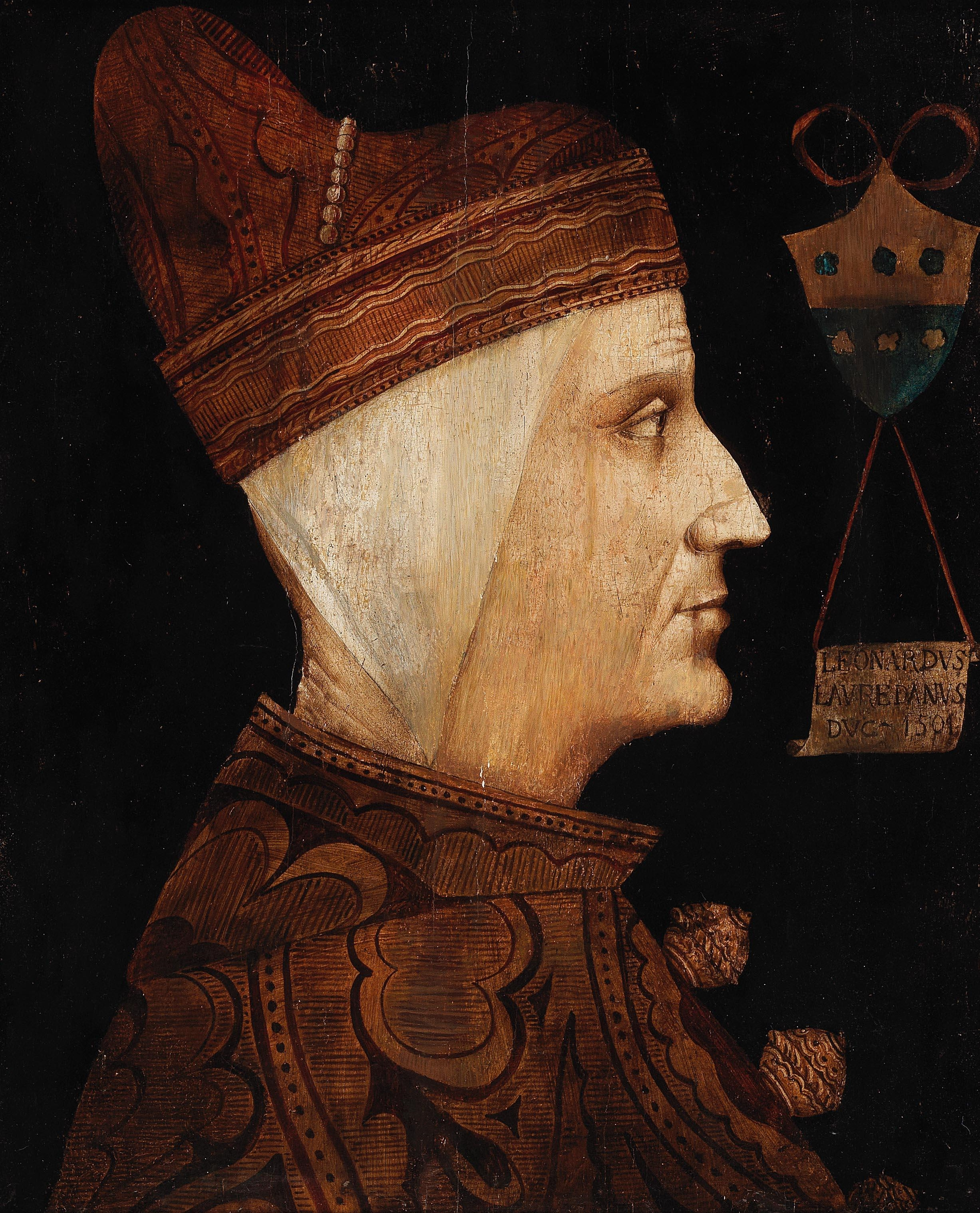
Portrait of Doge Leonardo Loredan, by Gentile Bellini, 1501, Dorotheum, Vienna

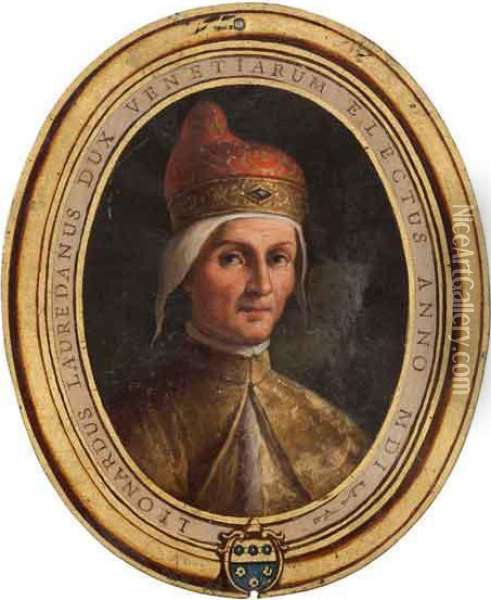
Portrait of Doge Leonardo Loredan, by Francesco Maggiotto, 18th century

Allegory of the Victory over the League of Cambrai, by Palma il Giovane, 1590, featuring Doge Leonardo Loredan, Doge's Palace, Venice

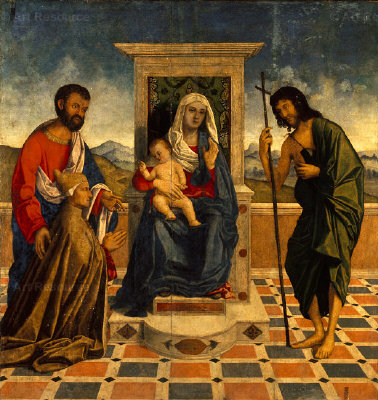
The Virgin with Child and Saints adored by Doge Leonardo Loredan, by Vincenzo Catena, 1506, Doge's Palace, Venice

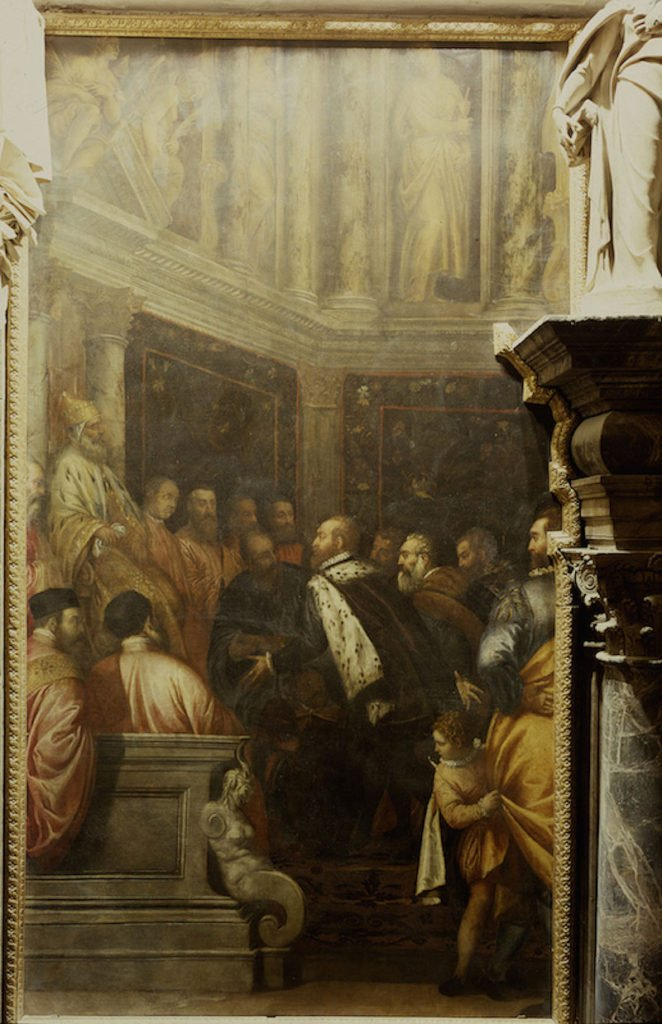
Doge Leonardo Loredan Giving Copies of the Laws of Venice to the Ambassadors from Nuremberg, by Carlo and Gabriele Caliari, 1588, Doge's Palace, Venice

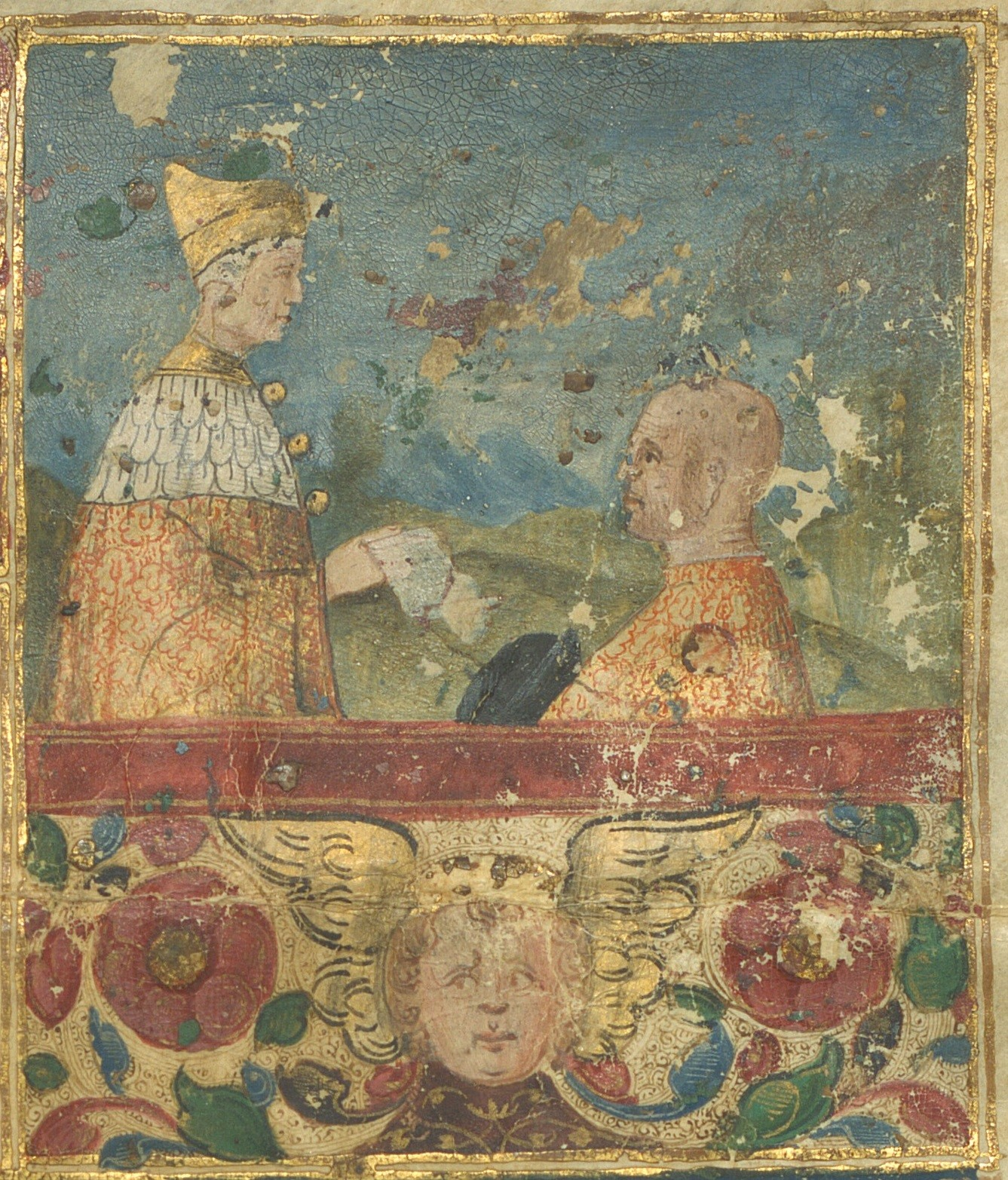
Doge Leonardo Loredan Handing a Parchment to Zauli Naldi, 1504, Manfrediana Library, Faenza

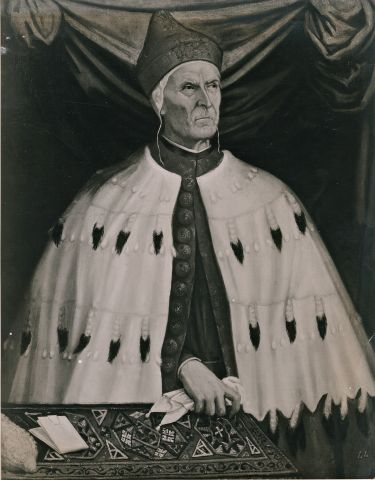
Portrait of Doge Leonardo Loredan, 16th century

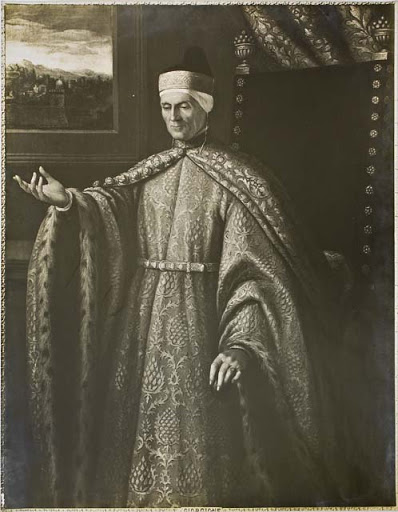
Portrait of Doge Leonardo Loredan, 16th century

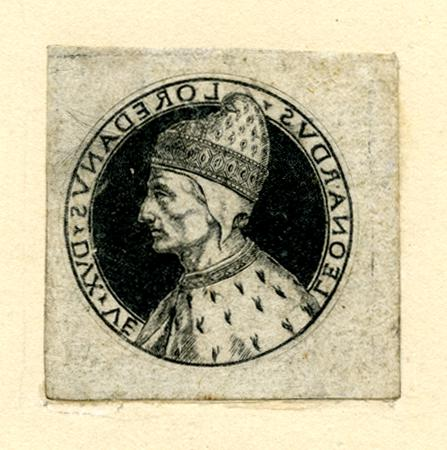
Print of Doge Leonardo Loredan, 18th century, British Museum, London

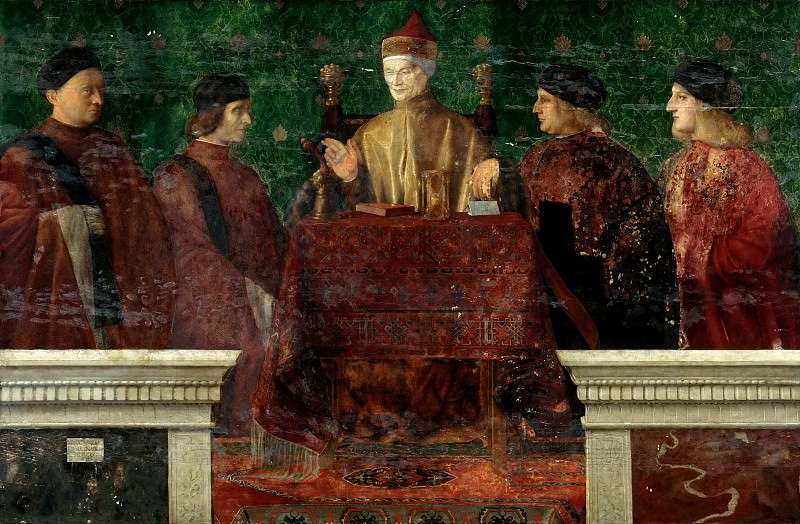
Doge Leonardo Loredan with Four Sons, by Giovanni Bellini, 1507, Gemäldegalerie, Berlin

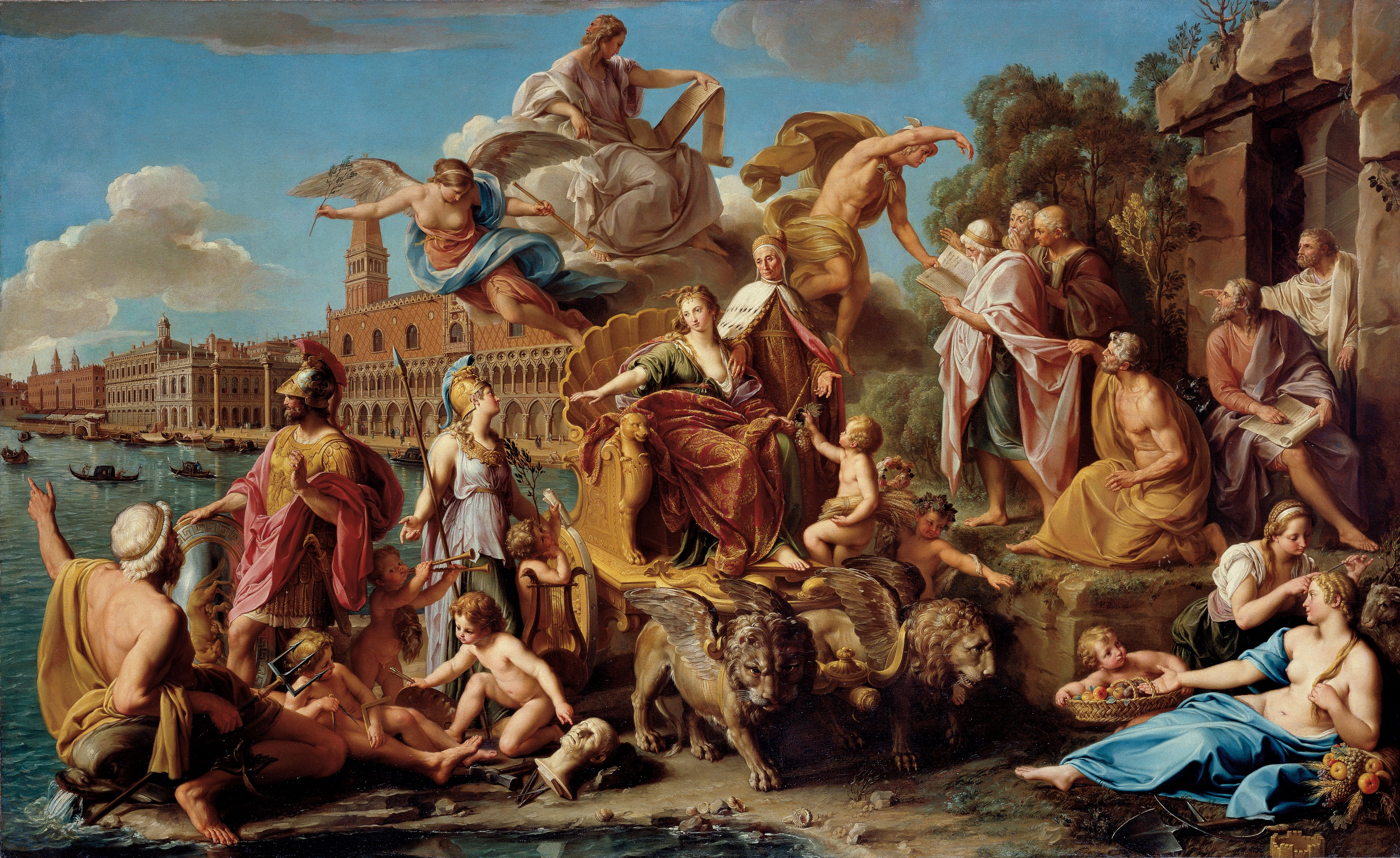
The Triumph of Venice, by Pompeo Batoni, 1737, featuring Doge Leonardo Loredan, North Carolina Museum of Art, Raleigh

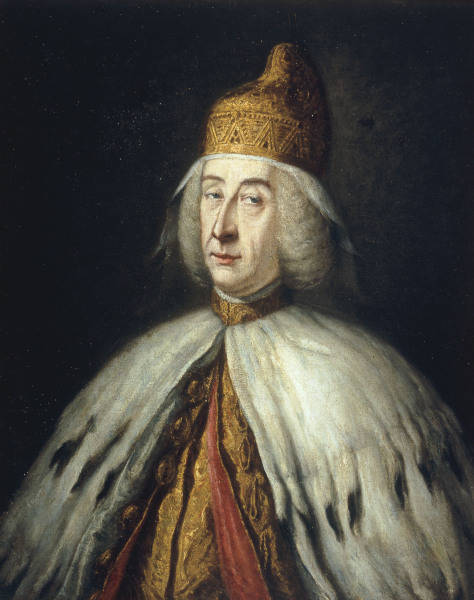
Portrait of Doge Francesco Loredan, by Fortunato Pasquetti

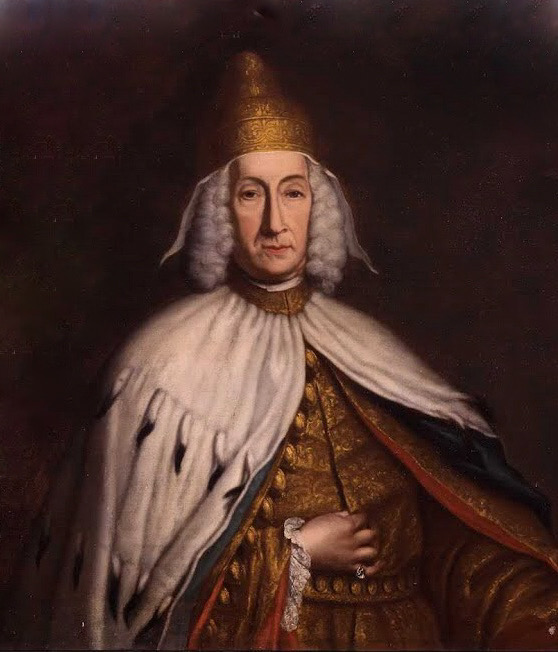
Portrait of Doge Francesco Loredan, by Jacopo Guarana

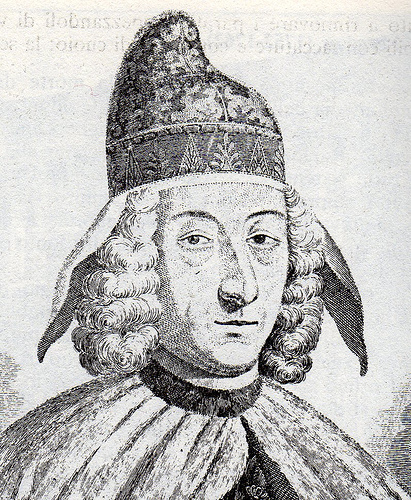
Portrait of Doge Francesco Loredan, by Antonio Nani

=== In sculpture ===
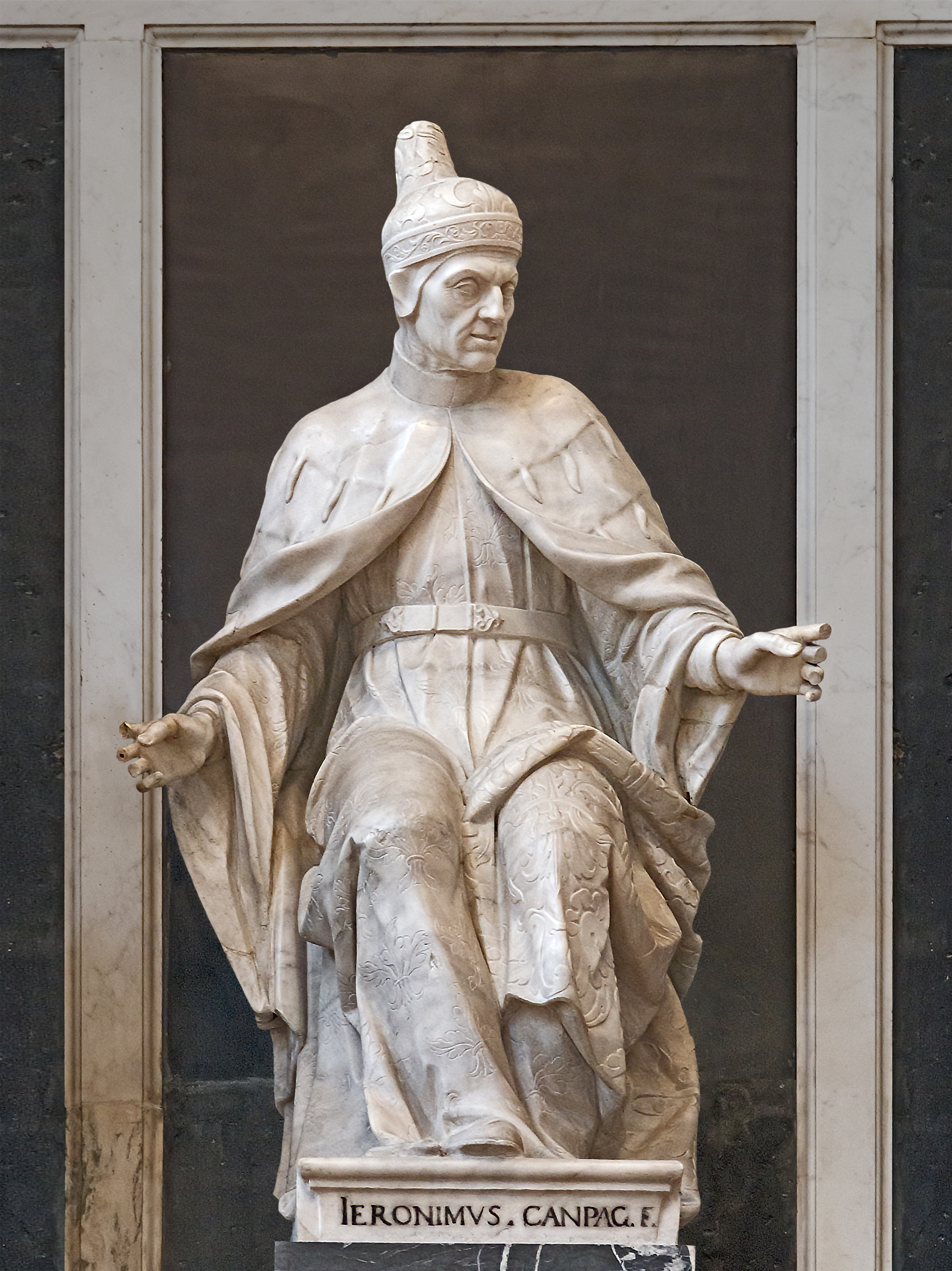
Statue of Doge Leonardo Loredan, by Girolamo Campagna, 1572, Basilica of Santi Giovanni e Paolo, Venice

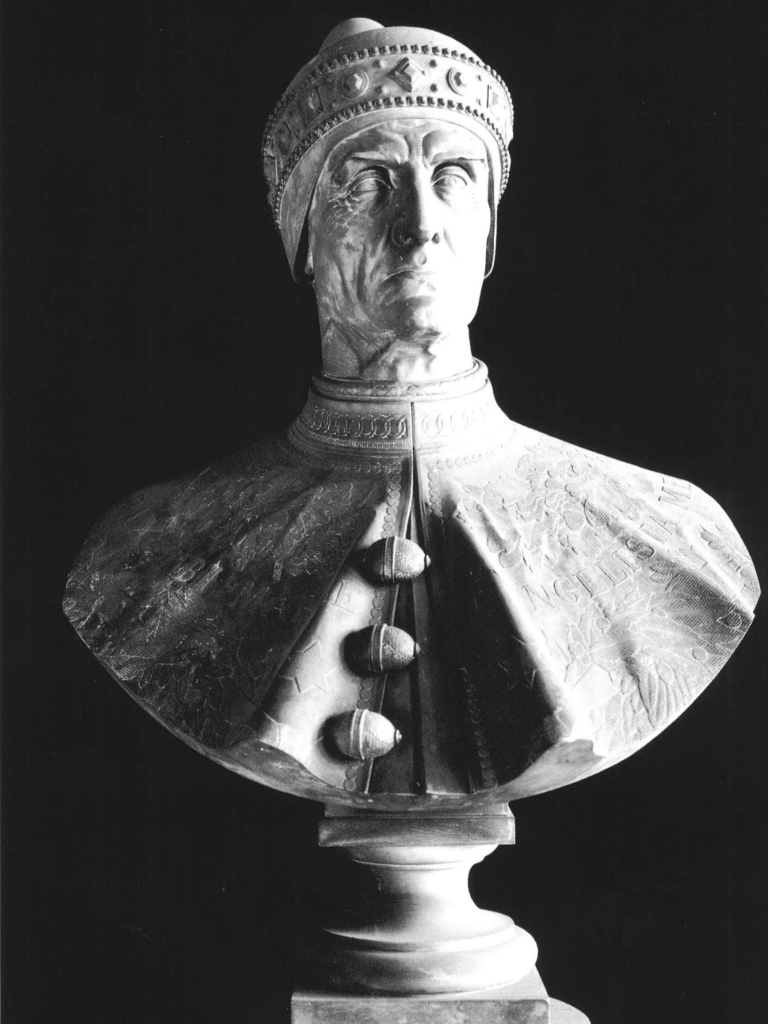
Bust of Doge Leonardo Loredan, Palazzo Loredan in Campo S. Stefano, Venice

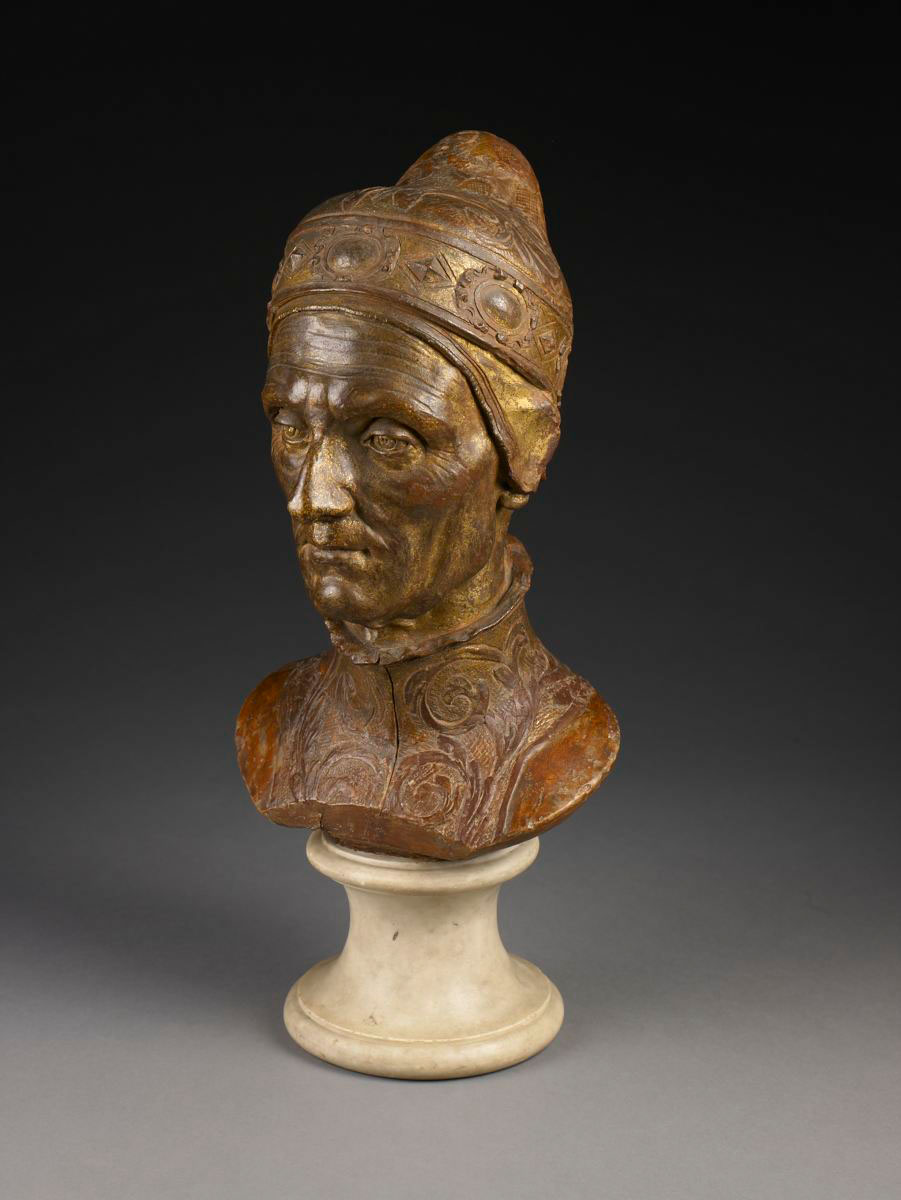
Bust of Doge Leonardo Loredan, by Danese Cattaneo, Birmingham Museum of Art, Birmingham

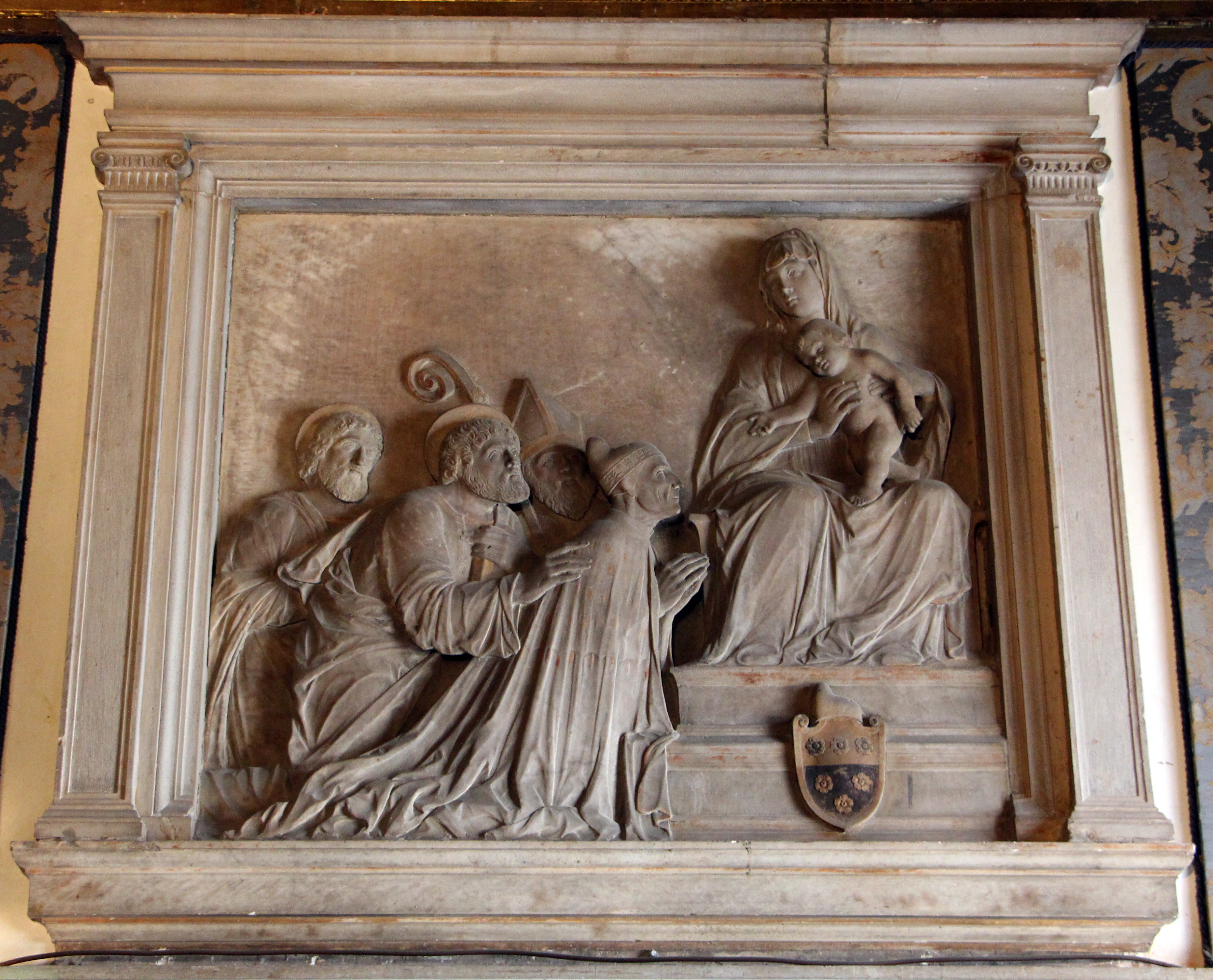
Doge Leonardo Loredan at the Feet of the Virgin with Saints, by Pietro Lombardo, Doge's Palace, Venice

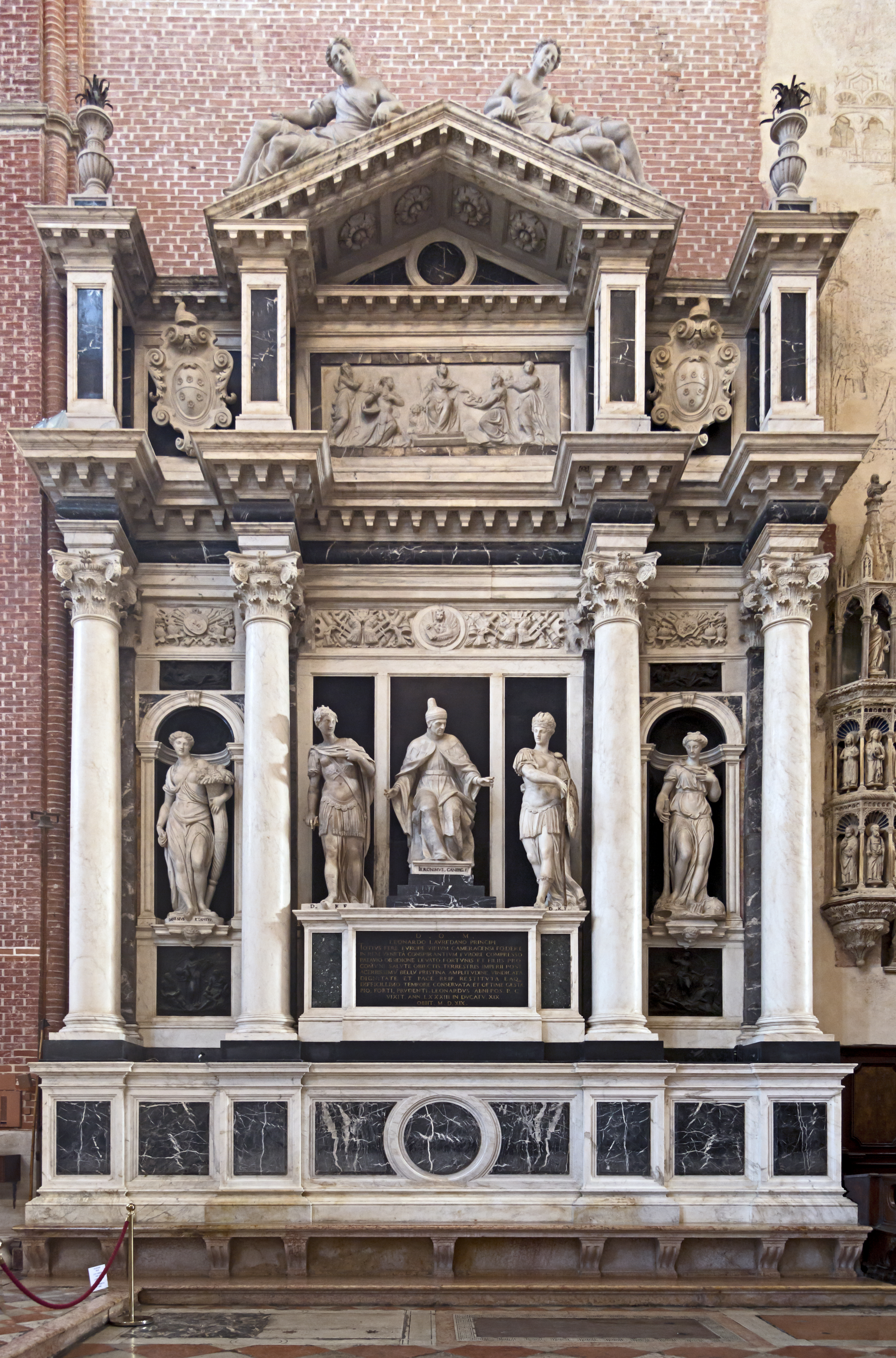
Tomb of Doge Leonardo Loredan, by Girolamo Grapiglia, 1572, Basilica of Santi Giovanni e Paolo, Venice

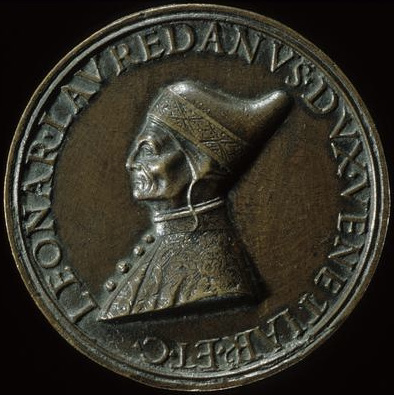
Medal featuring Doge Leonardo Loredan, by Vettor Gambello, 1508, British Museum, London
