= Francesco Loredan =

Doge of Venice from 1752 to 1762

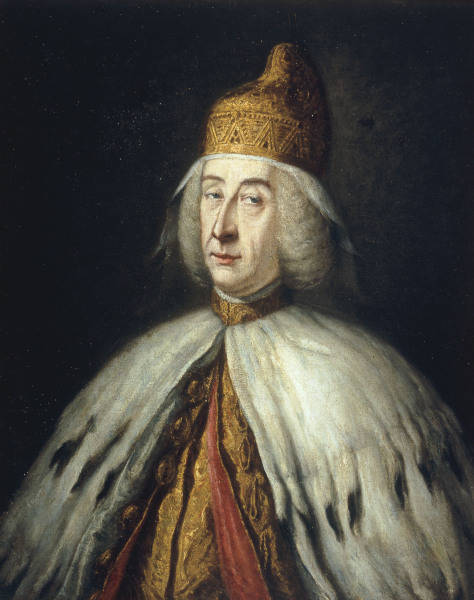
- Doge Francesco Loredan, by Fortunato Pasquetti

Doge of Venice
- Reign: 18 March 1752 – 19 May 1762
- Predecessor: Pietro Grimani
- Successor: Marco Foscarini
- Born: 9 February 1685; Venice
- Died: 19 May 1762 (aged 77); Venice
- Burial: 25 May 1762; Basilica of Saints John and Paul
- Dynasty: House of Loredan
- Father: Andrea Loredan
- Mother: Caterina Grimani
- Religion: Roman Catholicism

Francesco Loredan (Italian: [franˈtʃesko loreˈdan], Venetian: [fɾaŋˈtʃesko loɾeˈdaŋ]; 9 February 1685 – 19 May 1762) was a Venetian statesman and magnate who served as the 116th Doge of Venice from 18 March 1752 until his death in 1762. He was a member of the noble House of Loredan, head of its Santo Stefano branch, and the only Doge, as well as the last male, to be awarded the Golden Rose by the Papacy.

== Biography ==
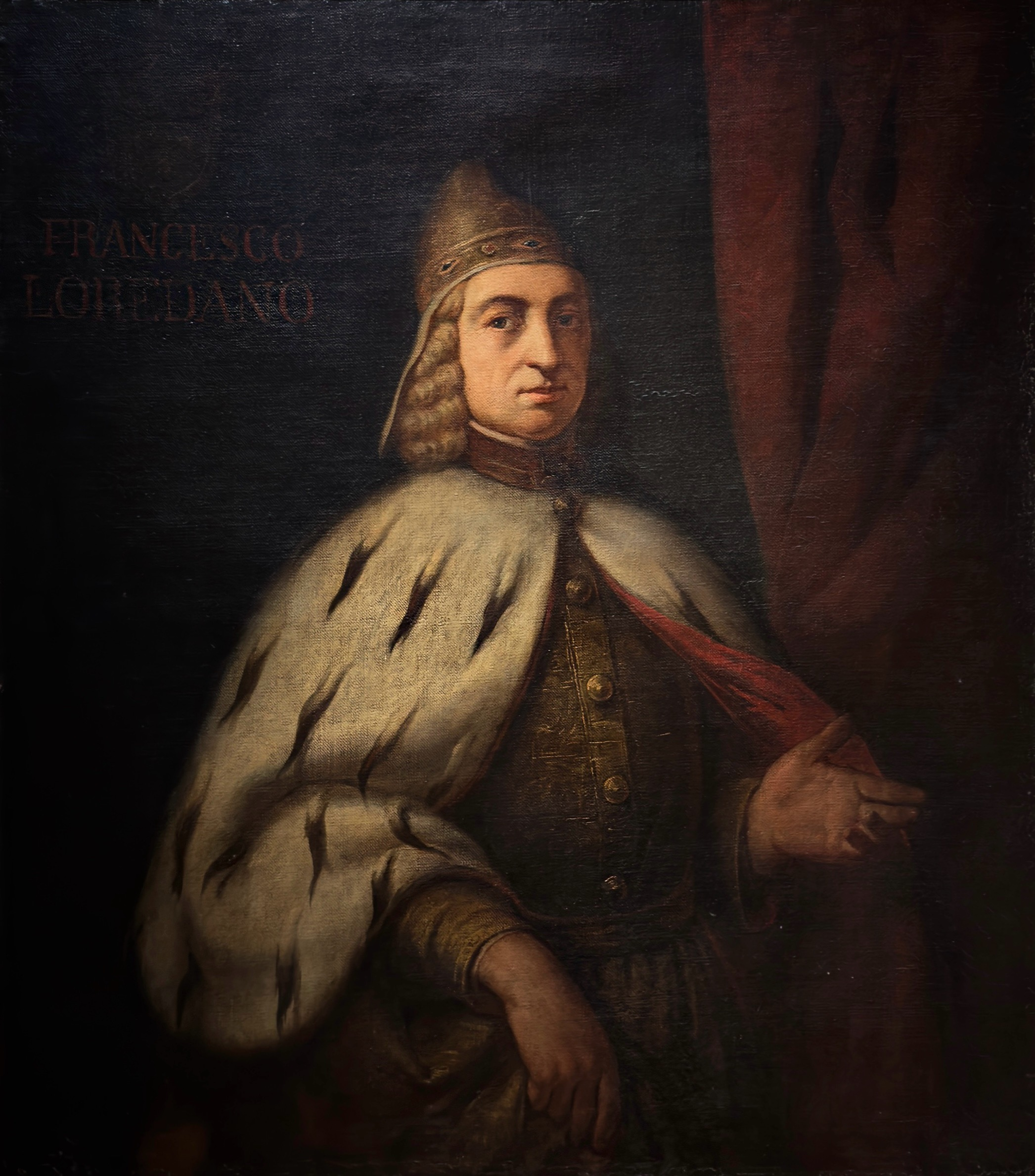
Portrait of Doge Francesco Loredan, Doge's Palace

=== Childhood ===
Francesco Loredan was born in Venice on 9 February 1687 to Andrea di Leonardo Loredan of the San Vidal branch and Caterina Grimani. He belonged to a rich, prestigious and large family: he had eight brothers and two sisters, a fact that almost certainly induced him not to marry.

=== Political career ===
Despite the family prestige, Francesco Loredan's cursus honorum was not remarkable: from 1711 to 1714 he was Savio agli Ordini, he held the role of Savio di Terraferma from 1721 to 1735 and from 1735 to 1751 he was Savio del Consiglio (except for the constraints of mandate). In the meantime, he was also the superintendent of the Chambers, of the Duties, of the Mint, of the Pumps, of the Feuds, cashier of the College, wise man of the Merchants, attorney of the Gold and Coins, deputy of the provision of funds, all secondary and not top positions.

From 1747 to 1749 he accepted the position of general superintendent in Palmanova, replacing his younger brother, Leonardo Loredan, who died in service. In the final report he underlined the need to increase the community of just 2,000 inhabitants and to improve local trade by introducing the freedom of movement and sale of grain and to encourage the local silk industry. In 1748 he refused the position of commissioner at the borders of the province of Friuli and Istria and returned to Venice where he resumed taking on ceremonial and medium-prestige roles and became close to the conservative faction within the Great Council.

In July 1750, as a wise man of the Council, he was the main spokesman for Pope Benedict XIV's initiative to send an apostolic vicar to the Patriarchate of Aquileia.

=== Dogeship ===
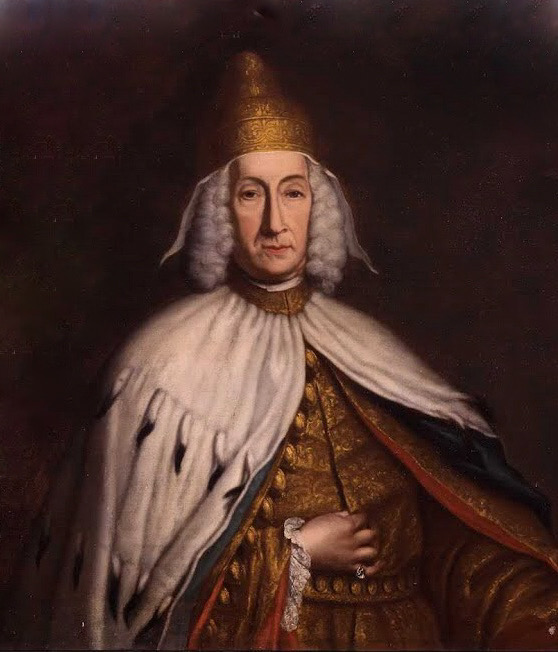
Portrait of Doge Francesco Loredan, by Jacopo Guarana

Francesco Loredan was elected doge on 18 March 1752 but the announcement was made on 6 April, postponed because of Easter. By this point, the dogal figure had lost nearly all his power and he quickly adapted to this new situation.

As Giacomo Nani wrote in 1756, Loredan was able to face the burdens of becoming doge and exercising the office because his family was one of those of the "first class", that is, "very rich" families. In 1741 he declared revenues of nearly 11,000 ducats; in 1758 alone he spent almost 43,000 for dogal endeavours and when he died, his income still exceeded 118,000 ducats. This was joined by the very extensive family landholdings. The costs of election feasts have often been incorrectly estimated, even by contemporaries (a 1772 writing in the Loredan files speaks of 90,000 ducats, while Samuele Romanin estimates them to be around 21,700). The surviving list of the individual items, however, allows us to estimate the cost at just over 38,600 ducats (of these, 2310 for the orchestra, 7635 for refreshments, 5800 donated to the people and 2140 to the arsenalotti). The figure for the celebrations seems incredibly high, with Romanin estimating it to be much higher than previous doges and unsurpassed by several successors. Despite this, one of the sonnets composed for the occasion complained of insufficient results, mocking the music and claiming that the "machine" of fireworks had funerary references. The expenses in the first year of his dogeship are also impressive, spending more than 117,000 ducats, including 6250 spent on furs.

Prodigal and generous, he was described "father of the poor" in two paintings by Pietro Longhi. He did not have a particular interest in culture and had a limited library showing only a certain activism in the artistic field; in addition to being portrayed by minor painters such as Bartolomeo Nazzari and Fortunato Pasquetti, he designed the reconstruction of the commercial maps of territories and countries in the Sala dello Scudo in the ducal palace and the portraits of the last forty-six doges in the Sala dello Scrutinio. He also had Giuseppe Angeli fresco part of the noble floor of the family palace in S. Stefano. But his more constant interest than himself was the management of the family estate. In addition to the famous palace, two buildings in S. Stefano and a house in San Basso, from the tithing census of 1739 and from other sources there were at least 76 houses and shops owned in various districts of Venice and Mazzorbo. There were also many buildings, agricultural lands and fields in the Venetian hinterland (Marghera, Meolo), in the Polesine (Canda, Anguillara Veneta, S. Martino di Venezze, Rovigo, Badia Polesine, Polesella) and in the Paduan area (Montagnana, Cittadella, Piove di Sacco, Altichiero), Trevigiano (Monastier, Conegliano, Asolo), Vicentino (Noventa Vicentina) and Verona, Friuli (Latisana) and Istria (Rovigno and Barban). Particularly important are the villas and land in Stra, Canda and Noventa Vicentina. It seems that these possessions, until 1755 in co-ownership with uncle Giovanni di Leonardo, brother of his father, largely dated back to the marriage, in the 1620s, of Francesca Barbarigo with Francesco Loredan, Loredan's great-grandfather. According to an estimate of 1755, the ex-Barbarigo lands yielded 11,000 ducats per year.

One of the biggest issues in domestic politics at the time was the clash between the conservatives and the reformers. The latter wanted to substantially reform the Republic and sought to build internal reforms. The conservative pressure groups were able to block these plans and imprisoned or exiled the reformist leaders, such as Angelo Querini, an important figure of the Venetian Enlightenment. The Doge did not want to show favour to one side or the other, so he remained totally passive and limited his support to making it easier for the winning side, thereby losing his chance to change the fate of the dying republic. By impeding the development of the reformist ideas, he possibly caused the small economic boom which started around 1756 with the outbreak of the Seven Years' War.

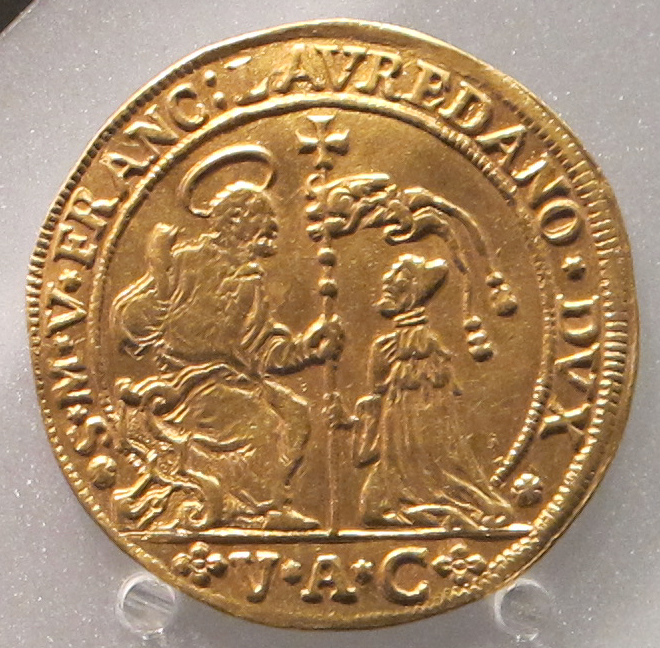
Coin featuring Francesco Loredan, 1754

The famed author and adventurer Giacomo Casanova was locked in the notorious lead chambers under Francesco Loredan's government in 1755 for suspicious activities, from which he managed his spectacular escape.

The neutrality of the Republic during this time allowed the merchants to trade in huge markets without competitors. The French defeat even allowed Venice to become the biggest market for eastern spices.

In 1752, Francesco offered the Palazzo Loredan dell'Ambasciatore as a residence for the ambassador of the Holy Roman Empire, and the first Imperial ambassador to live there was Count Philip Joseph Orsini-Rosenberg.

In 1759, Loredan was awarded the Golden Rose by Pope Clement XIII, becoming the first and only doge to obtain the award.

At one point the Doge, who was old and tired by then, seemed about to die but recovered and lived for another year, until his death on 19 May 1762. The funeral took place on 25 May, and he was buried in the Basilica of Santi Giovanni e Paolo, in Leonardo Loredan's dogal tomb. The funeral cost an impressive sum of around 18,700 ducats, and was paid for by Francesco's brother Giovanni.

== Ancestry ==
House of Loredan-Santo Stefano (Genealogy)

Nicolò Loredan
Gerolamo Loredan (d. 1474)	Donata Donà
Antonio Grimani (1434-1523)	Caterina Loredan	Leonardo Loredan (1436-1521)	Giustina Giustiniani (d. 1500)	Pietro Loredan (1466-1510)
Domenico Grimani (1461-1523)	Lorenzo Loredan (1462-1534)	Girolamo Loredan (1468-1532)	Alvise Loredan (1472-1521)	Bernardo Loredan (1481-1519)	Vincenzo Loredan (d. 1499)	Donata Loredan	Maria Loredan	Giovanni Venier	Paola Loredan	Elisabetta Loredan
Carlo Contarini (1580-1656)	Paolina Loredan	Francesco Venier (1489-1556)
Francesco Loredan	Francesca Barbarigo
Leonardo Loredan (d. 1675)	Alba Soranzo
Francesco Loredan (1656-1715)	Giovanni Loredan (1662-1725)	Andrea Loredan (1664-1704)	Caterina Grimani	Francesca Loredan	Elisabetta Loredan	Maria Loredan	Maddalena Loredan	Paolina Loredan
Francesco Loredan (1685-1762)	Girolamo Loredan	Caterina Cornaro	Giovanni Loredan (d. 1767)	Anna Maria Vendramin	Francesco Loredan	Antonio Loredan	Antonio Loredan	Leonardo Loredan	Leonardo Loredan	Girolamo Loredan	Contarina Loredan	Giovanni Tommaso Mocenigo	Alba Loredan
Andrea Loredan (d. 1750)	Caterina Loredan

Note: The branch of Santo Stefano is also known as the branch of San Vidal (San Vitale).

Note: There are some generations missing between Girolamo Loredan (1468-1532) and Francesco Loredan (17th century).

Note: Giustina Giustiniani (d. 1500), the wife of Doge Leonardo Loredan (1436-1521), is also known as Morosina Giustiniani.

Note: Caterina Loredan, Dogaressa of Venice, is featured in the family tree as the daughter of Gerolamo Loredan (d. 1474) and Donata Donà because, in some sources, she is mentioned as the sister of Doge Leonardo Loredan (1436-1521), although she may have been a daughter of Domenico Loredan.

Interestingly, near the Palazzo Contarini-Sceriman and the nearby bridge, Leonardo Loredan (d. 1675) was found dead in a boat. The unexplained death was the source of many rumors, claiming accidental death, murder by relatives, or murder by the Inquisitors of the Republic.

Andrea Loredan (d. 1750) died young, thus ending the male (agnatic) line of the branch of Santo Stefano.

== Awards ==
- Golden Rose - 1759

== In popular culture ==
Francesco Loredan was portrayed by Tim McInnerny in the 2005 romance film Casanova, loosely based on the life of the famous adventurer and author Giacomo Casanova, who was imprisoned in the Piombi under Loredan's government in 1755 for affront to religion and common decency.

Political offices
Preceded by Pietro Grimani	Doge of Venice; 1752–1762	Succeeded by Marco Foscarini
