= Francesco Loredan (ambassador) =

17th/18th-century Venetian nobleman and diplomat

- N.H.
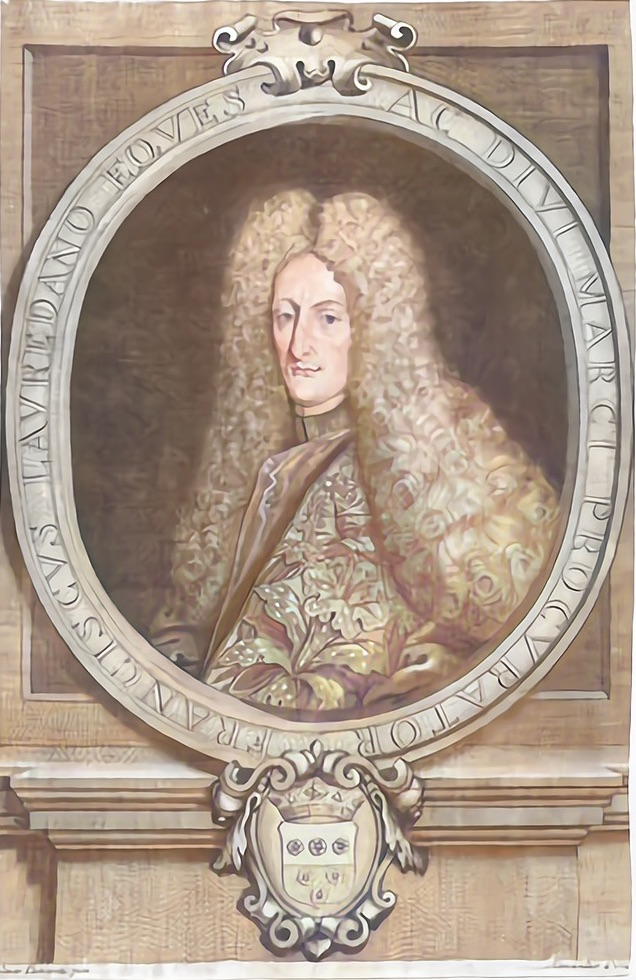

Ambassador to Vienna
- Predecessor: Carlo Ruzzini
- Years active: 1682 - 1715
- Born: 1656; Villa Loredan at Stra
- Died: 10 July 1715 (aged 58–59); Palazzo Loredan at Campo Santo Stefano
- Family: House of Loredan
- Father: Leonardo Loredan
- Mother: Alba Soranzo

Francesco Loredan (Italian: [franˈtʃesko loreˈdan], Venetian: [fɾaŋˈtʃesko loɾeˈdaŋ]; 1656 – 10 July 1715) was a Venetian magnate and nobleman of the Loredan family, and an ambassador of the Republic of Venice to Vienna (Holy Roman Empire) during the peace negotiations between the Ottoman Empire and the Holy League, which resulted in the Treaty of Karlowitz (1699).

== Early life and family ==
He was born, presumably at the family villa in Stra, near Venice, on 19 October 1656 into the Santo Stefano branch of the Loredan family as the eldest son of the patrician Leonardo di Francesco Loredan (d. 1675), and of Alba Soranzo di Andrea, of the prestigious branch called the Golden Touch.

From Leonardo and Alba, who celebrated their marriage, on 5 February 1655, in the monastery of Santa Maria delle Vergini, three other men and six women were born. Giovanni (1662-1725), Andrea (1664-1704), the only one who married, producing numerous children with Caterina Grimani, including Francesco Loredan, elected doge in 1752, and Girolamo. The daughters, except one who became a nun, married, richly married, with the offspring of some of the most prominent families: Francesca with Almorò Dolfin, Elisabetta with Antonio Da Mula, Maria with Marino Zorzi, Maddalena with Antonio Giustinian and Paolina with Domenico Zane.

His father, who had not had an exceptional political career, but had left a considerable fortune, died in 1675 when he was found dead in a boat near the Palazzo Contarini-Sceriman. The unexplained death was the source of many rumours, claiming accidental death by fall from a bridge, murder by relatives, or murder by the Inquisitors of the Republic. The widow, Alba, was responsible for the children, some of whom were very young.

== Career ==
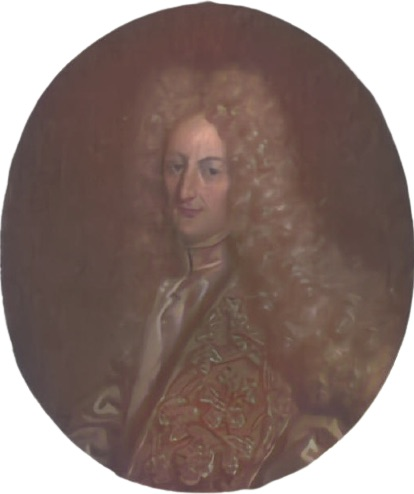
Portrait of Francesco Loredan

Francesco anticipated his entry into the Maggior Consiglio in 1677, at the age of 21. Favoured by family prestige, he made his debut in politics in 1682 with the election as Savio degli Ordini. After the election to the magistrate of the Twelve Offices in March 1685, his career made a qualitative leap, and in the same year he was in the shortlist of candidates for the French embassy, entering the College in November with the appointment as Wise Man of Terraferma, a position to which he was recalled ten times between 1685 and 1696. In 1698, he was appointed as ordinary ambassador to Vienna, replacing Carlo Ruzzini who was sent to lead the delegation of the Serenissima to the Carlowitz congress. Having received the commission on 30 August, on 15 September he was in Padua and on 18 October he sent the first dispatch from Vienna.

Responsible not only to vigorously resume the negotiations on the long-standing and unresolved issues of borders and the Istrian salt trade, but above all to strengthen the alliance with the Empire, while ensuring the Habsburg intentions on the anti-Turkish league and the peace negotiations are in course, Loredan, in the first phase of his mandate, primarily assumed a role of support to the diplomatic action of Ruzzini, a role that proved to be burdensome and fraught with difficulties. From the first audience with the Emperor Leopold I of Habsburg, beyond the conventional manifestations of praise of the sovereign, he felt the rigidity of the counterpart on bilateral issues and the scarce propensity to conduct negotiations with the Turks in common agreement, resumed in the November 1698 in Carlowitz. In human and political harmony with Ruzzini, in a distinct but complementary position, he worked assiduously both with the Habsburg rulers and with the ambassadors of the great powers, especially those of England and Holland, mediating countries in the Carlowitz negotiations, to keep his guard up against the delaying tactics of the Turks, quirky negotiators, ready to exploit the divisions between the states of the League. Overcoming frequent health failures, bound by the provisions of a government eager to obtain favorable peace conditions, but hampered by the irresolution and untimeliness of the Venetian government, already inclined to equidistant neutrality, Loredan carried out the difficult task of reconciling the urgent need to end a long and costly war with the will not to give in to Ottoman pretensions. The long, dense and frequent dispatches sent to Venice, as well as the correspondence with Ruzzini, document Loredan's lucid awareness of the difficult Venetian position and of the fact that the compactness of the allies was not at all in effect. He wrote to Ruzzini, who shared his perplexity towards his own government and who, like him, was an interpreter of the state of mind of those patricians who looked anxiously to the future because of the unreliability of the Turks. He concluded, on 21 February 1699, the negotiations with the signing of the agreements also by the Serenissima.

In the second part of his mandate, Loredan returned to routine, trying, with little success, to resolve bilateral issues and at the same time decipher the complex mechanisms of Habsburg power together with a careful reading of the international scenario. The last dispatch was sent on 13 April, and on 5 May 1703, Loredan obtained permission to repatriate, after the troubled events of Carlowitz and the intense and painful activity carried out at the imperial court.

On 5 June 1702, he was elevated to the prestigious position of Procurator of San Marco de Citra, to which he could add the title of Knight of the Golden Spur, conferred on him by the emperor on his leave. He repatriated to Venice, and on 30 June 1703 he became a Wise Man of the Council. In January of 1705, he was elected regulator of the Scriptures and in June again Wise Man of the Council. His career continued intensely and in prestigious roles: Wise Man of the Council (1705, 1706, 1709), reformer at the University of Padua (1705, 1709, 1713), Wise Man of Trade (1706) and deputy to the provision of money (June 1710).

At the end of his last assignment, as a reformer at the University of Padua, he fell ill and after twenty-two days he died, in the Palace of Santo Stefano, on 10 July 1715.

He remained unmarried, and left a very respectable inheritance, increased over the years, despite the huge expenses incurred for the embassy, and consisting of properties in Venice and vast land holdings, embellished with prestigious manor houses, in the Venetian area, around Treviso and Padua, in the Veronese area and in the territories of Rovigo and Polesine, to his brother, Giovanni, also unmarried, and to his nephews, children of his brother Andrea.

== Ancestry ==
House of Loredan-Santo Stefano (Genealogy)

Nicolò Loredan
Gerolamo Loredan (d. 1474)	Donata Donà
Antonio Grimani (1434-1523)	Caterina Loredan	Leonardo Loredan (1436-1521)	Giustina Giustiniani (d. 1500)	Pietro Loredan (1466-1510)
Domenico Grimani (1461-1523)	Lorenzo Loredan (1462-1534)	Girolamo Loredan (1468-1532)	Alvise Loredan (1472-1521)	Bernardo Loredan (1481-1519)	Vincenzo Loredan (d. 1499)	Donata Loredan	Maria Loredan	Giovanni Venier	Paola Loredan	Elisabetta Loredan
Carlo Contarini (1580-1656)	Paolina Loredan	Francesco Venier (1489-1556)
Francesco Loredan	Francesca Barbarigo
Leonardo Loredan (d. 1675)	Alba Soranzo
Francesco Loredan (1656-1715)	Giovanni Loredan (1662-1725)	Andrea Loredan (1664-1704)	Caterina Grimani	Francesca Loredan	Elisabetta Loredan	Maria Loredan	Maddalena Loredan	Paolina Loredan
Francesco Loredan (1685-1762)	Girolamo Loredan	Caterina Cornaro	Giovanni Loredan (d. 1767)	Anna Maria Vendramin	Francesco Loredan	Antonio Loredan	Antonio Loredan	Leonardo Loredan	Leonardo Loredan	Girolamo Loredan	Contarina Loredan	Giovanni Tommaso Mocenigo	Alba Loredan
Andrea Loredan (d. 1750)	Caterina Loredan

Note: The branch of Santo Stefano is also known as the branch of San Vidal (San Vitale).

Note: There are some generations missing between Girolamo Loredan (1468-1532) and Francesco Loredan (17th century).

Note: Giustina Giustiniani (d. 1500), the wife of Doge Leonardo Loredan (1436-1521), is also known as Morosina Giustiniani.

Note: Caterina Loredan, Dogaressa of Venice, is featured in the family tree as the daughter of Gerolamo Loredan (d. 1474) and Donata Donà because, in some sources, she is mentioned as the sister of Doge Leonardo Loredan (1436-1521), although she may have been a daughter of Domenico Loredan.

Interestingly, near the Palazzo Contarini-Sceriman and the nearby bridge, Leonardo Loredan (d. 1675) was found dead in a boat. The unexplained death was the source of many rumors, claiming accidental death, murder by relatives, or murder by the Inquisitors of the Republic.

Andrea Loredan (d. 1750) died young, thus ending the male (agnatic) line of the branch of Santo Stefano.
