= Istituto Veneto di Scienze, Lettere ed Arti =

Academy of sciences in Venice

Coordinates: 45.43277°N 12.32994°E

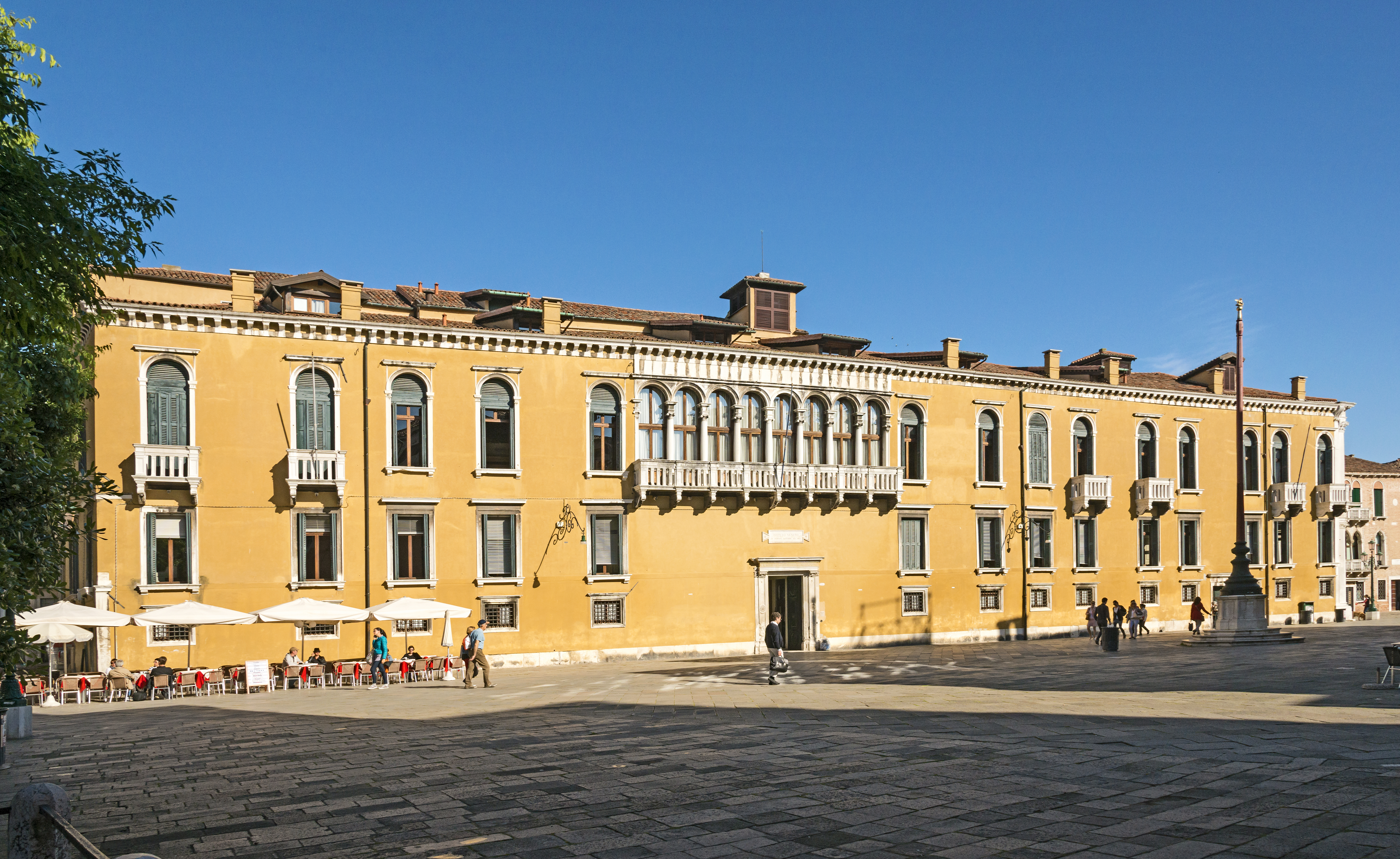
Palazzo Loredan in Campo Santo Stefano

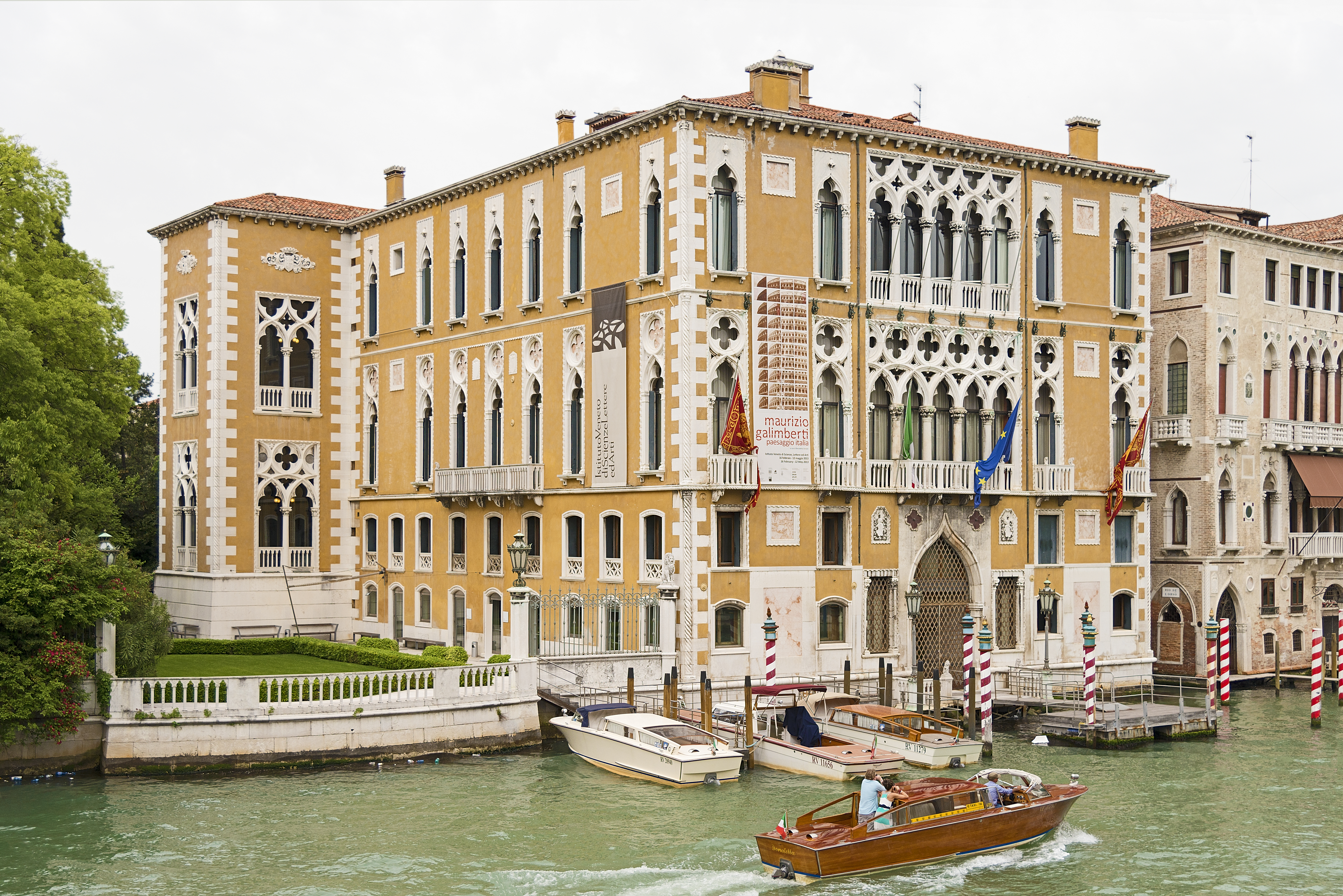
Palazzo Cavalli-Franchetti

The Istituto Veneto di Scienze, Lettere ed Arti (transl. "Venetian Institute of Sciences, Letters and Arts"; IVSLA) is an academy of sciences in Venice, Italy.

== History ==
The Istituto Veneto was created as the Reale Istituto Nazionale, created by Napoleon for the Kingdom of Italy in 1810. The current name was given in 1838 by Ferdinand I, Emperor of Austria, when the Venetia was under Austrian government. In 1866, after the annexation of the Venetia to the Kingdom of Italy, the Istituto Veneto di Scienze, Lettere ed Arti was recognized as one of the most prestigious Italian academies. Since 1838, the activity of Istituto Veneto di Scienze, Lettere ed Arti has run uninterruptedly.

The first seat of the IVSLA was Palazzo Ducale in Venice, then it transferred, in 1893, to Palazzo Loredan. In 1999, Palazzo Franchetti was bought, and the new seat was inaugurated in 2004.

== Structure ==
The institute accounts for 290 fellows, divided in two classes (Class of Sciences and Class of Humanities); each Class is made of fellows (soci effettivi), corresponding fellows (soci corrispondenti), foreign fellows (soci stranieri) and honorary fellows (soci onorari). Fellows are formally appointed by the Ministry of Cultural Affaires after being elected by the Assembly of the soci effettivi.

== Activity ==
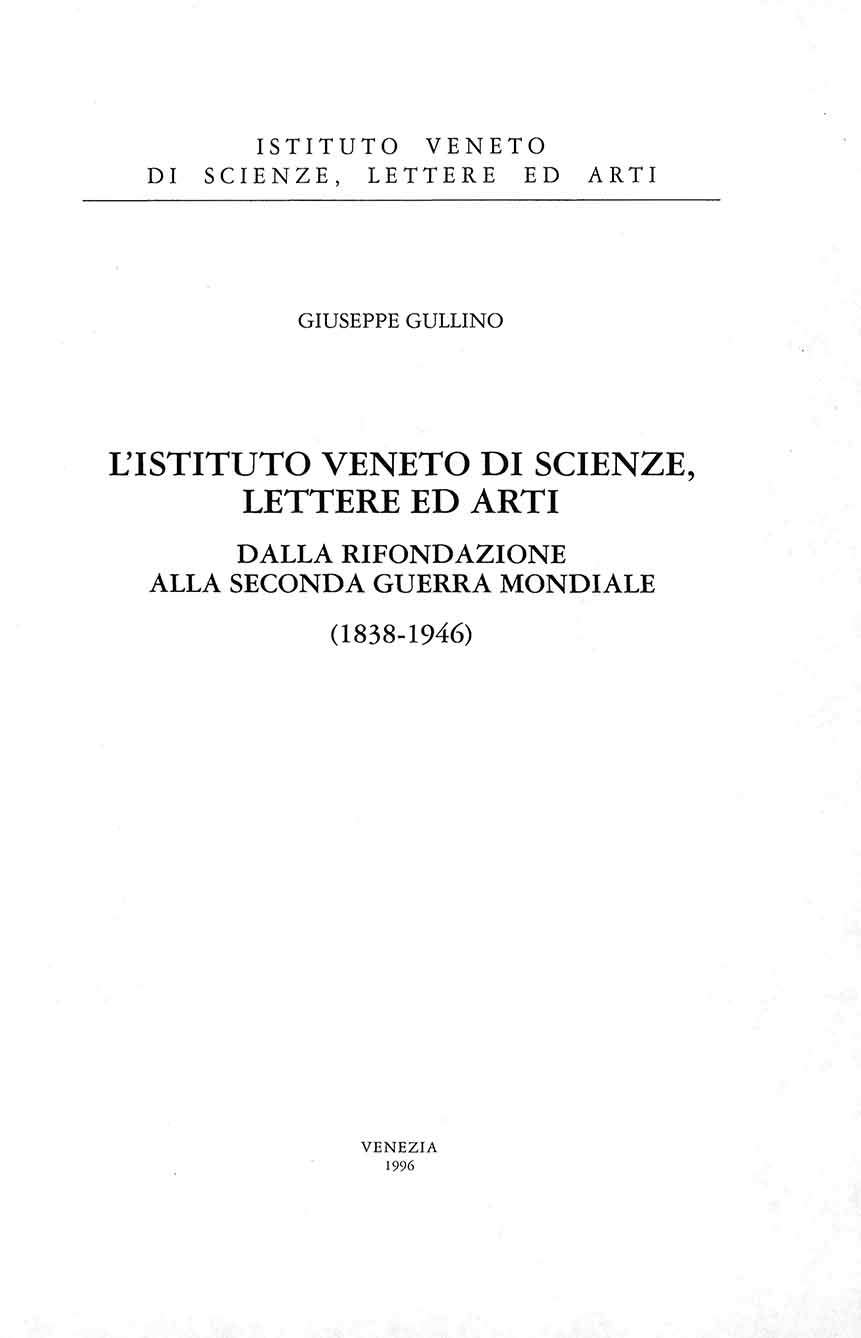
Istituto Veneto di Scienze, Lettere ed Arti, 1996

The institute's activities include monthly academic meetings (adunanze), where fellows present their studies to be published on the magazine «Atti dell’Istituto Veneto di Scienze, Lettere ed Arti». The institute also regularly promotes meetings, conferences and seminars on Sciences, Humanities and Art. The institute publishes and prints books (presently the catalogue accounts over 100 titles). Particular attention is devoted to diffusion of culture by audiovisual media, information technology and internet communications. The institute owns a rich library (over 300.000 volumes) and several archives, including that of Luigi Luzzatti, Italian prime minister in 1911.

== Partnership ==
=== Italians ===
- Accademia dei Lincei
- National Research Council (Italy)
- University of Padua
- Ca' Foscari University of Venice
- Istituto Nazionale di Fisica Nucleare
- Società Italiana di Biofisica Pura ed Applicata
- Fondazione Federico Zeri
- Museo Galileo
- Stazione Zoologica
- Archivi del Novecento - La memoria in rete (Roma)
- Istituto Ellenico di Studi Bizantini e Postbizantini di Venezia
- Unione Zoologica Italiana
- Istituto per la Ricerca Valutativa sulle Politiche Pubbliche - IRVAPP

=== Internationals ===
- All European Academies
- École Normale Supérieure
- École du Louvre (Paris)
- Institut national du patrimoine
- Oesterreichische Academie der Wissenschaften
- Konrad Lorenz Institute for Ethology
- Environmental Systems Science Centre
- International Risk Governance Council di Ginevra - IRGC
- Massachusetts Institute of Technology
- Duke University
- Princeton University
- The Italian Academy, Columbia University
- Vanderbilt University

== Notable members ==
=== Class of Sciences ===
Roberto Ardigò, Giovanni Canestrini, Giuseppe Colombo, Galileo Ferraris, Tullio Levi Civita, Guglielmo Marconi, Angelo Messedaglia, Umberto Nobile, Pietro Paleocapa, Louis Pasteur, Antonio Pacinotti, Gregorio Ricci Curbastro, Giuseppe Jappelli, Quintino Sella, Patrizia Caraveo, Susanna Terracini.

=== Class of Humanities ===
Carlo Anti, Bernard Berenson, Camillo Boito, Vittore Branca, Giosuè Carducci, Fernand Braudel, Antonio Canova, André Chastel, Carlo Cipolla, Benedetto Croce, Francesco De Sanctis, Giacomo Devoto, Francesco Ferrara, Antonio Fogazzaro, Giuseppe Gerola, Virgilio Guidi, Ferdinand Gregorovius, René Huyghe, Frederic C. Lane, Luigi Luzzatti, Francesco Malipiero, Terenzio Mamiani, Alessandro Manzoni, Concetto Marchesi, Luigi Meneghello, Jules Michelet, Marco Minghetti, Pompeo Molmenti, Theodor Mommsen, Costantino Nigra, Pierre de Nolhac, Aldo Palazzeschi, Gaston Palewski, Giovanni Pascoli, Ezra Pound, Leopold von Ranke, Alfred von Reumont, Antonio Rosmini, Luigi Settembrini, Diego Valeri, Pasquale Villari, Giacomo Zanella.
