= Palazzo Loredan in Campo Santo Stefano =

Palace in the San Marco district of Venice

Palazzo Loredan at Campo Santo Stefano
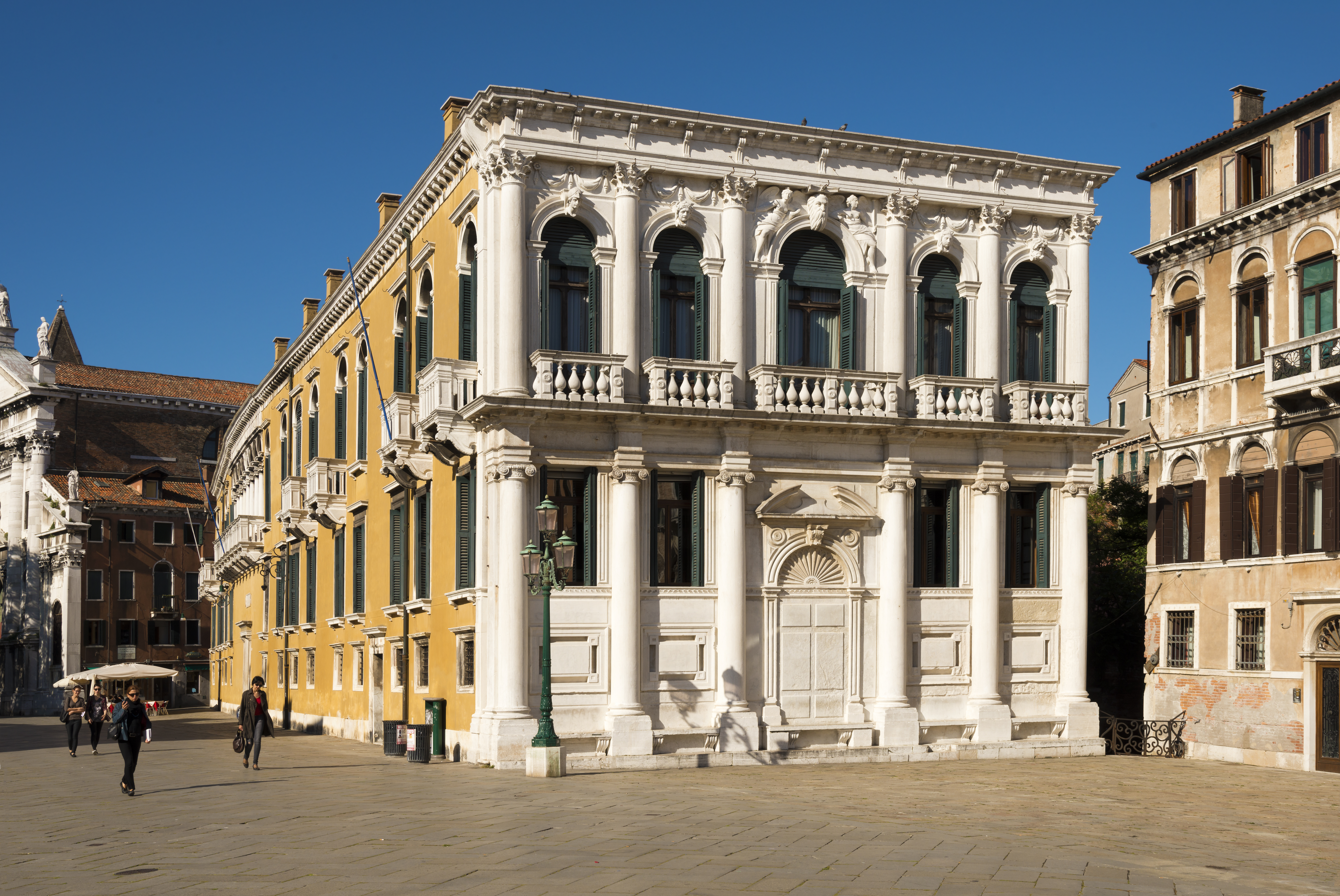
- Short side of the Palace
- Interactive map of the Palazzo Loredan at Campo Santo Stefano area
- Etymology: by Campo Santo Stefano and the Loredan family

General information
- Location: Campo Santo Stefano 2945, San Marco, Venice, Italy
- Affiliation: House of Loredan

Renovating team
- Architect: Antonio Abbondi

Website
- http://www.istitutoveneto.it

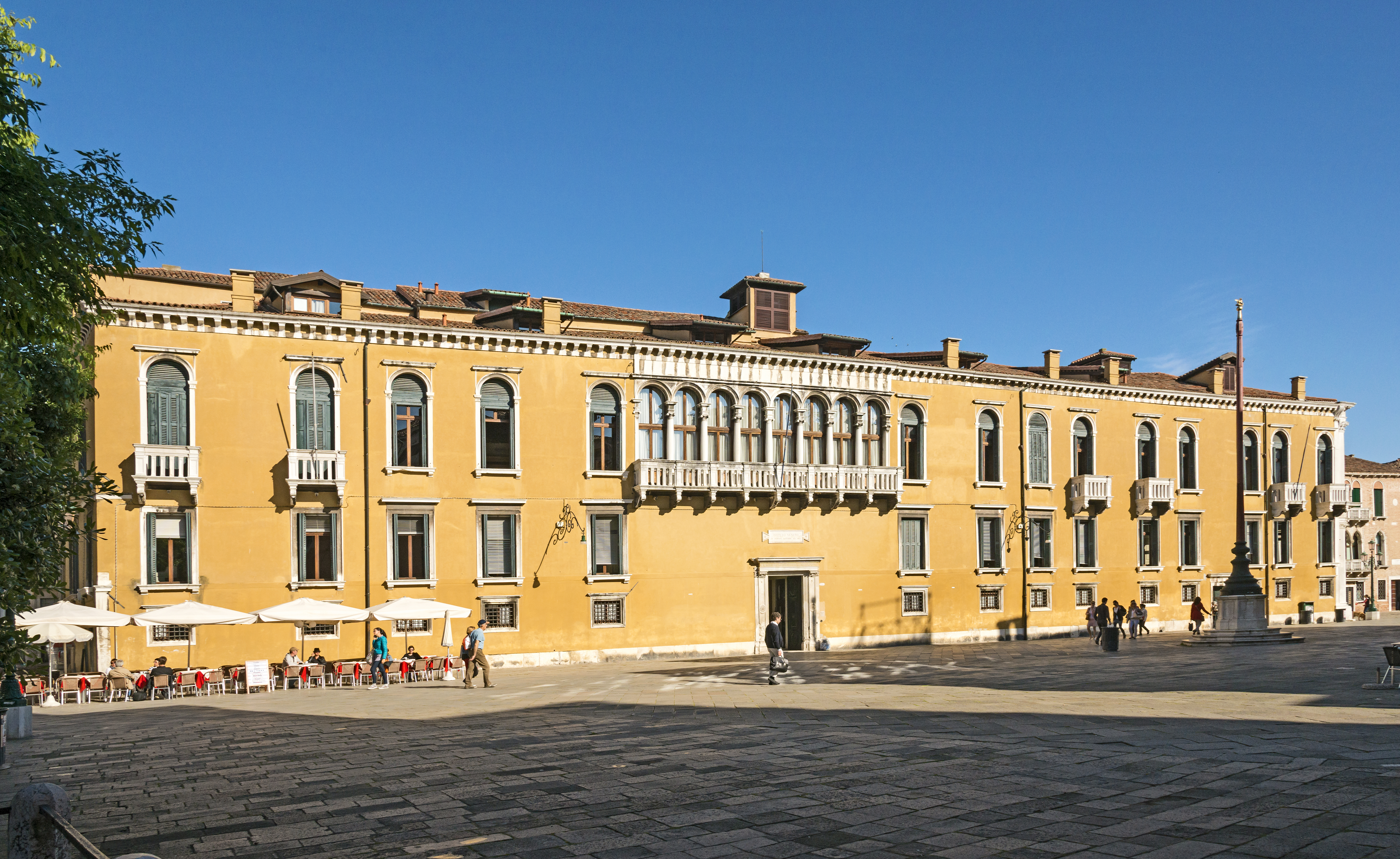
Palazzo Loredan in Campo S. Stefano (long side)

The Palazzo Loredan at Campo Santo Stefano is a palace in the San Marco district of Venice, overlooking Campo Santo Stefano. Before the acquisition by the Loredan family in 1536 and the restoration by the architect Antonio Abbondi, it was a group of adjacent buildings, in the Gothic style, belonging to the Mocenigo family. The purchased buildings were substantially restored and made into a single building for the residence of the wealthy noble family of Loredan. The palace has throughout history been home to at least seven Doges of Venice.

== History ==
After the fall of the Republic of Venice, an heir of the Loredan family sold the building to a businessman around 1802–1805.

In 1813, the building was purchased by the United Kingdom, and it became the seat of the Ministry of Defence with its military court and residence of the Governor.

Between 1855 and 1862, the building became the seat of the provincial public buildings office. On this occasion, radical works have been carried out to convert the south wing of the building to offices. For this, a mezzanine was built on the main floor.

In 1888, the building was assigned as the seat of the Venetian Institute of Science, Literature and Arts which was moved there in 1891. On this occasion, numerous restoration and furnishing works were carried out.

== Architecture ==
Originally in the Gothic style, it currently has a narrower front that occupies much of the length of Campo Santo Stefano and a smaller but richer facade. The mullioned front on the long side is made up of 8 windows and nine Corinthian columns. The side facing Campiello Loredan reveals the previous architectural style. The richest façade is the one that looks towards the church of Santo Stefano formed by a majestic stone front that recalls the style of the long side, by Giovanni Gerolamo Grapiglia. Inside, one can see the large entrance hall obtained by using many of the elements belonging to the houses that previously stood on site. The capitals of the columns are of Gothic origin and therefore have probably been reused. To create this entrance hall, with the double staircase leading to the main floor, the external portico between two buildings was closed with a wall, and one can still see the well with the Mocenigo coat of arms inside. The splendid monumental staircase, which recalls the Scala dei Giganti of Palazzo Ducale, was carried out by Antonio Abbondi. The exterior of the building in the version of the restoration of 1500 included the fresco in the long part of the building with motifs from the Tuscan-Roman mannerist style. The artist who painted them is Giuseppe Porta known as Salviati. The frescoes exalted the domestic civic and military virtues of characters from the Roman world such as: Lucrezia, Clelia, Porsenna and Muzio Scevola. The latter was boasted as the traditional progenitor of the Loredan family.

== Paintings ==
On the ceiling of a mezzanine room it is possible to see paintings by Palma il Giovane and Antonio Vassilacchi dating back to 1600. The four paintings depicting scenes from the Old Testament and were probably moved from other rooms of the palace in 1800.

In 1752, on the occasion of Francesco Loredan's election as Doge, a room on the piano nobile was frescoed. The fresco is attributed to Giuseppe Angeli and the squares to Francesco Zanchi. Still in the same room, the ornamental stuccos are attributed to Giuseppe Ferrari.

Of notable interest is also the fresco by Giovanni Carlo Bevilacqua entitled Napoleonic Allegory; this painting was recently restored after the attempt to destroy it by the Germans in 1814.

== Panteon Veneto ==
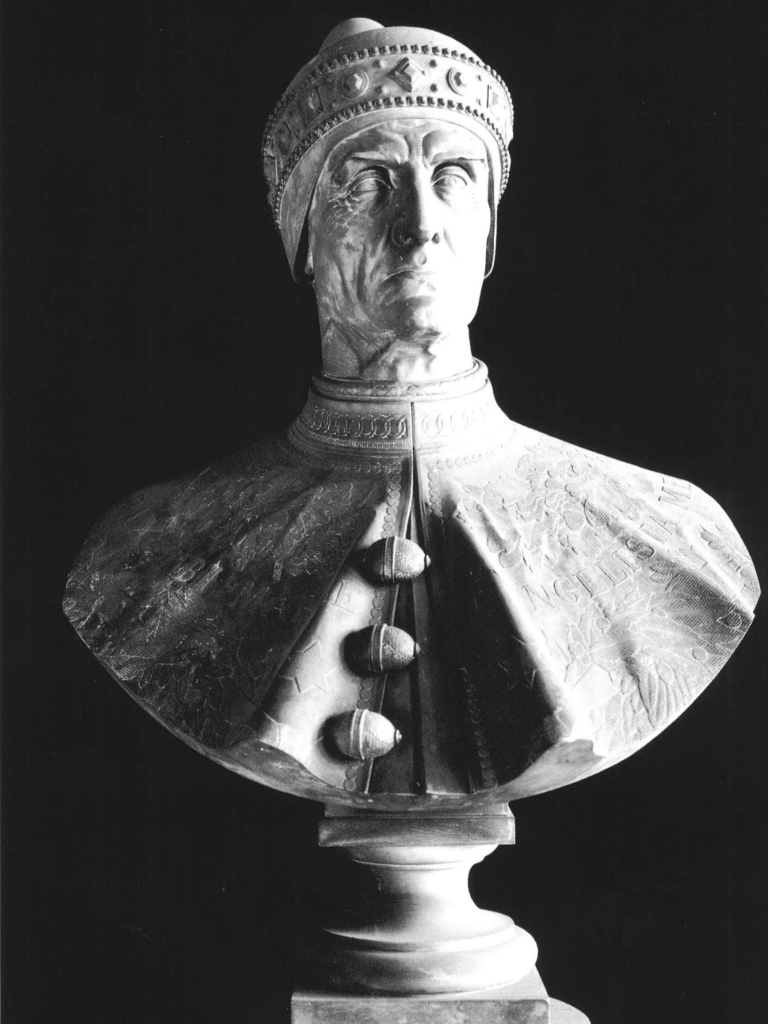
Bust of Doge Leonardo Loredan (r. 1501–1521) in the Venetian Pantheon

The Pantheon was created in 1847 when, on the occasion of the IX Congress of Italian Scientists, the Venetian Institute of Sciences, Literature and Arts asked to form a collection of images, in the form of busts or medallions, of the great Venetians, those who distinguished themselves in their profession (politicians, scientists, artists, soldiers, writers, etc.), and who lived for a long time in Veneto from ancient times to the eighteenth century. The busts and medallions that form the Panteon Veneto were removed from the Palazzo Ducale in 1955, deposited in Ca' Pesaro and finally received in 1989 at the Venetian Institute of Sciences, Letters and Arts in the Palazzo Loredan, where they can currently be seen on display in the hall. The project begun in 1847 ended in 1931: the last bust added to the collection was that of Carlo Gozzi.
