= Fortunato Pasquetti =

Italian painter

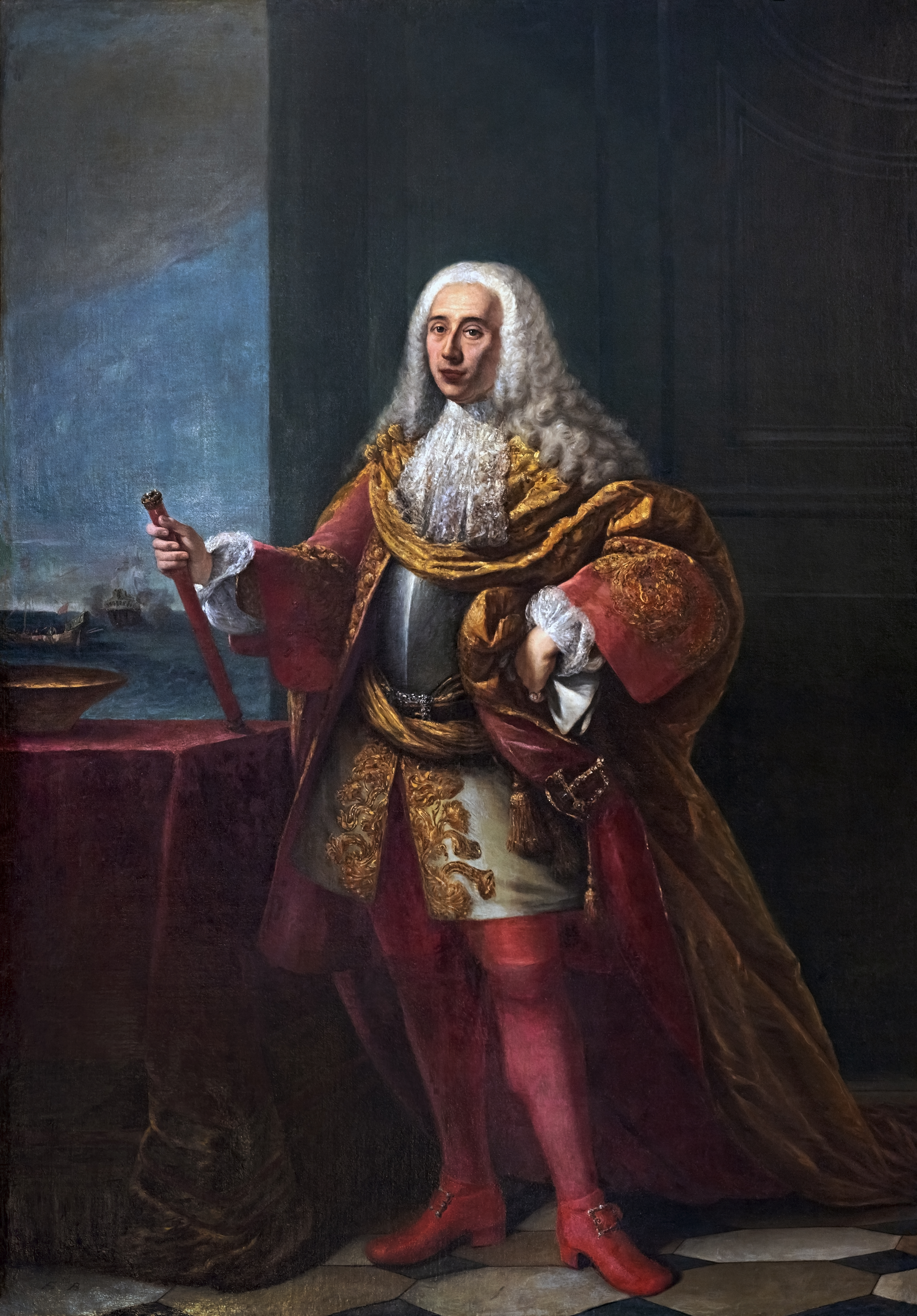
Portrait of the Gerolamo Maria Balbi

Gerolamo Querini, Pinacoteca Querini Stampalia

Fortunato Pasquetti (1690–1773) was a Venetian painter of the Rococo period. He is known for his formal portraits of royalty and Venetian Patriciate. He was born in Venice and died in Portogruaro. He trained under Niccolò Cassana. He painted a portrait of Charles VI, Holy Roman Emperor.
