= Campo Santo Stefano =

City square in San Marco, Venice, Italy

Coordinates: 45.43309°N 12.33021°E

- Campo (Square)
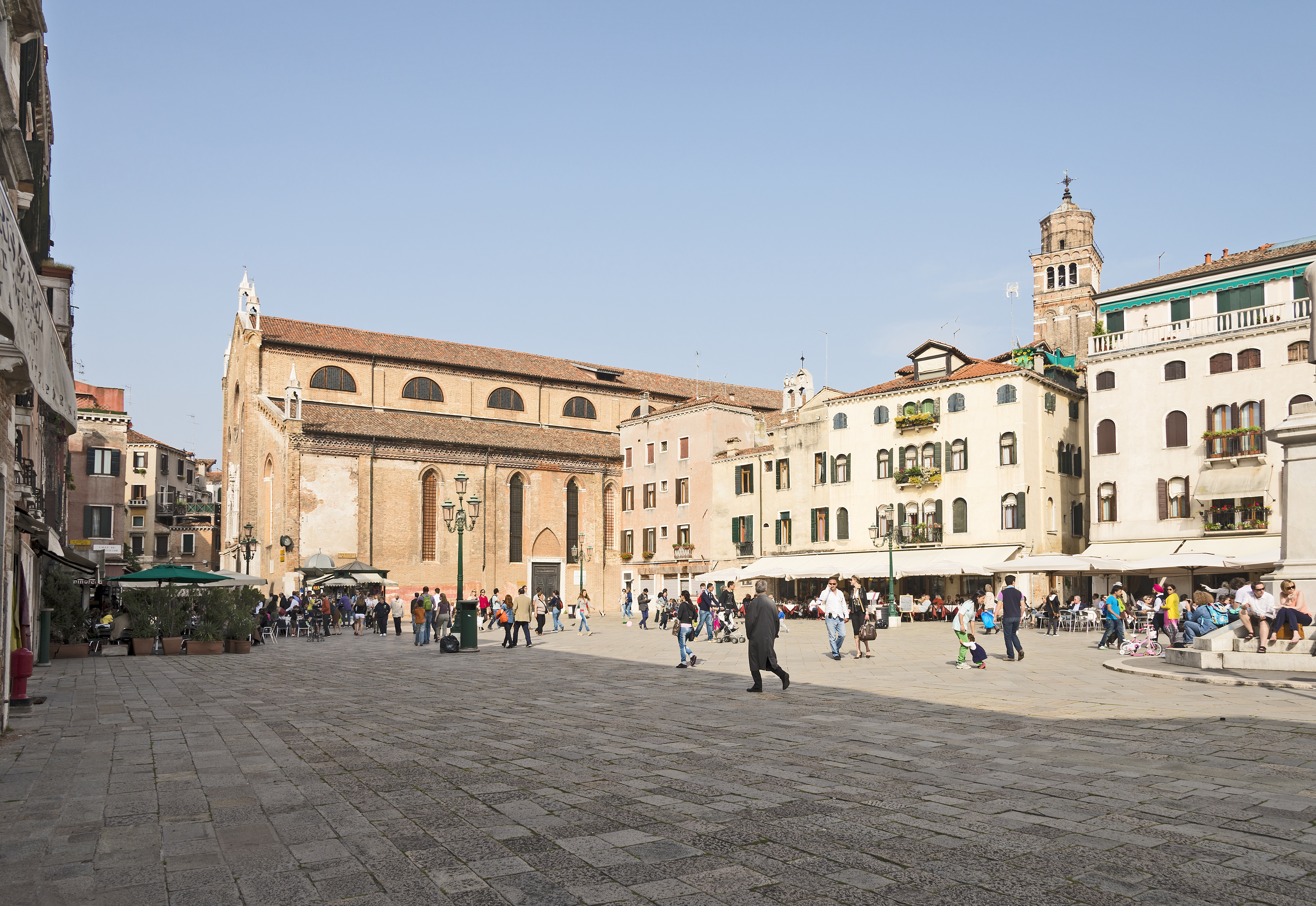
- Location: Venice, Italy
- Interactive map of Campo Santo Stefano

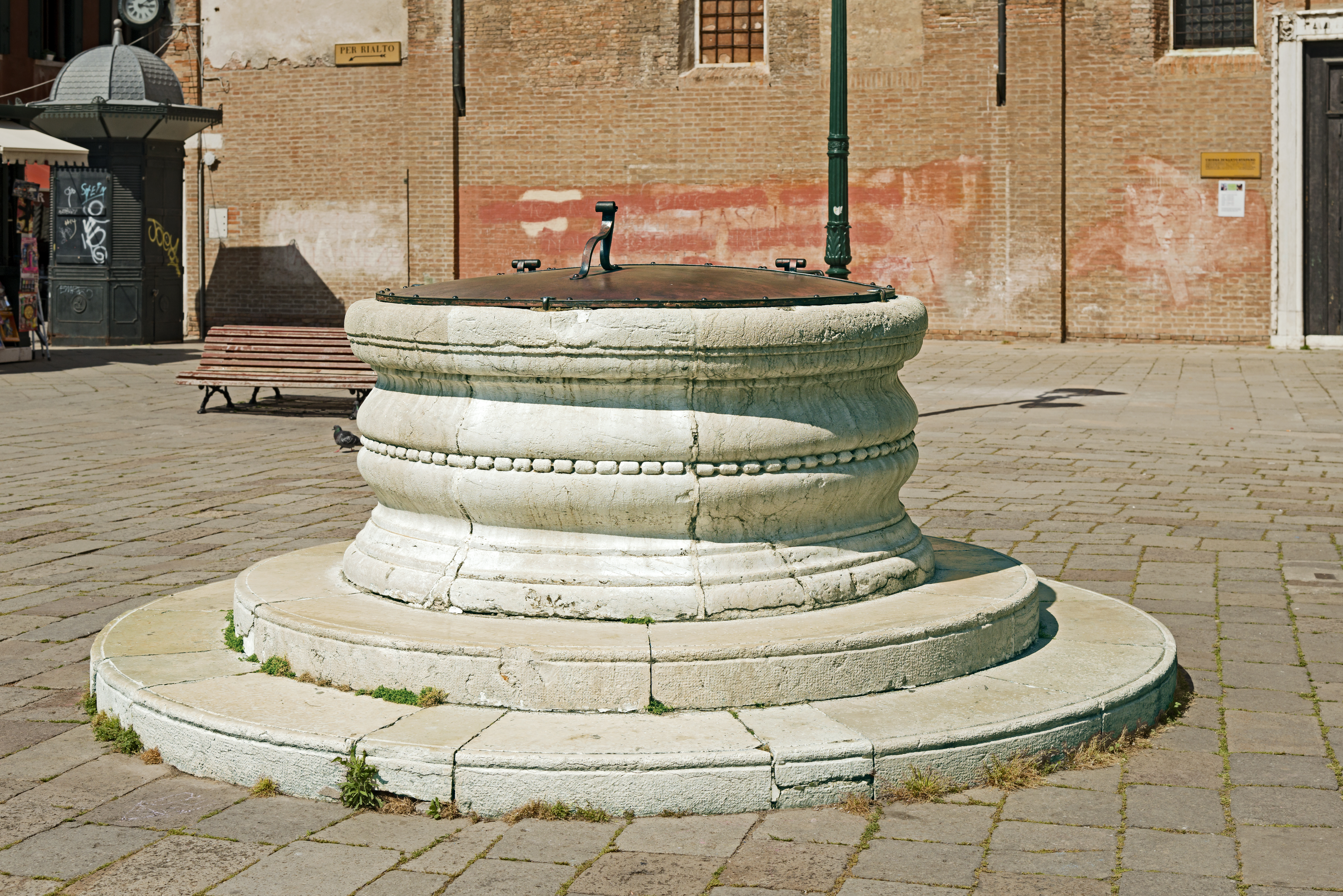
Well on Campo Santo Stefano

Campo Santo Stefano is a city square near the Ponte dell'Accademia, in the sestiere of San Marco, Venice, Italy.

== Buildings around the square ==
- Santo Stefano
- San Vidal, Venice
- Palazzo Morosini Gatterburg
- Palazzo Loredan
- Palazzo Pisani a Santo Stefano
