= Antonio Grimani =

Doge of Venice from 1521 to 1523

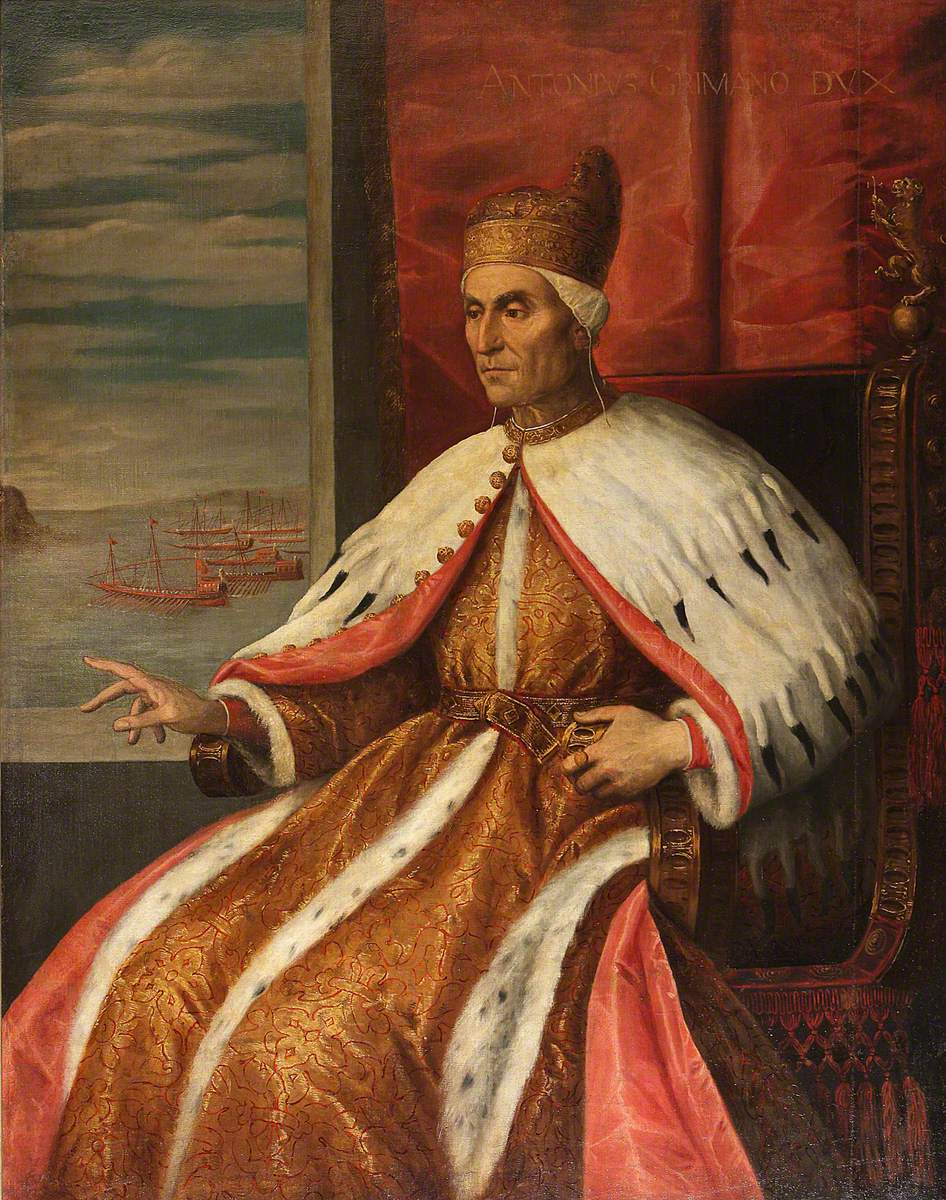
- Posthumous portrait of Grimani

76th Doge of the Most Serene Republic of Venice
- In office 6 June 1521 – 7 May 1523
- Preceded by: Leonardo Loredan
- Succeeded by: Andrea Gritti

Personal details
- Born: 28 December 1434 Venice
- Died: 7 May 1523 (aged 88) Venice
- Spouse: Caterina Loredan
- Children: Domenico Grimani

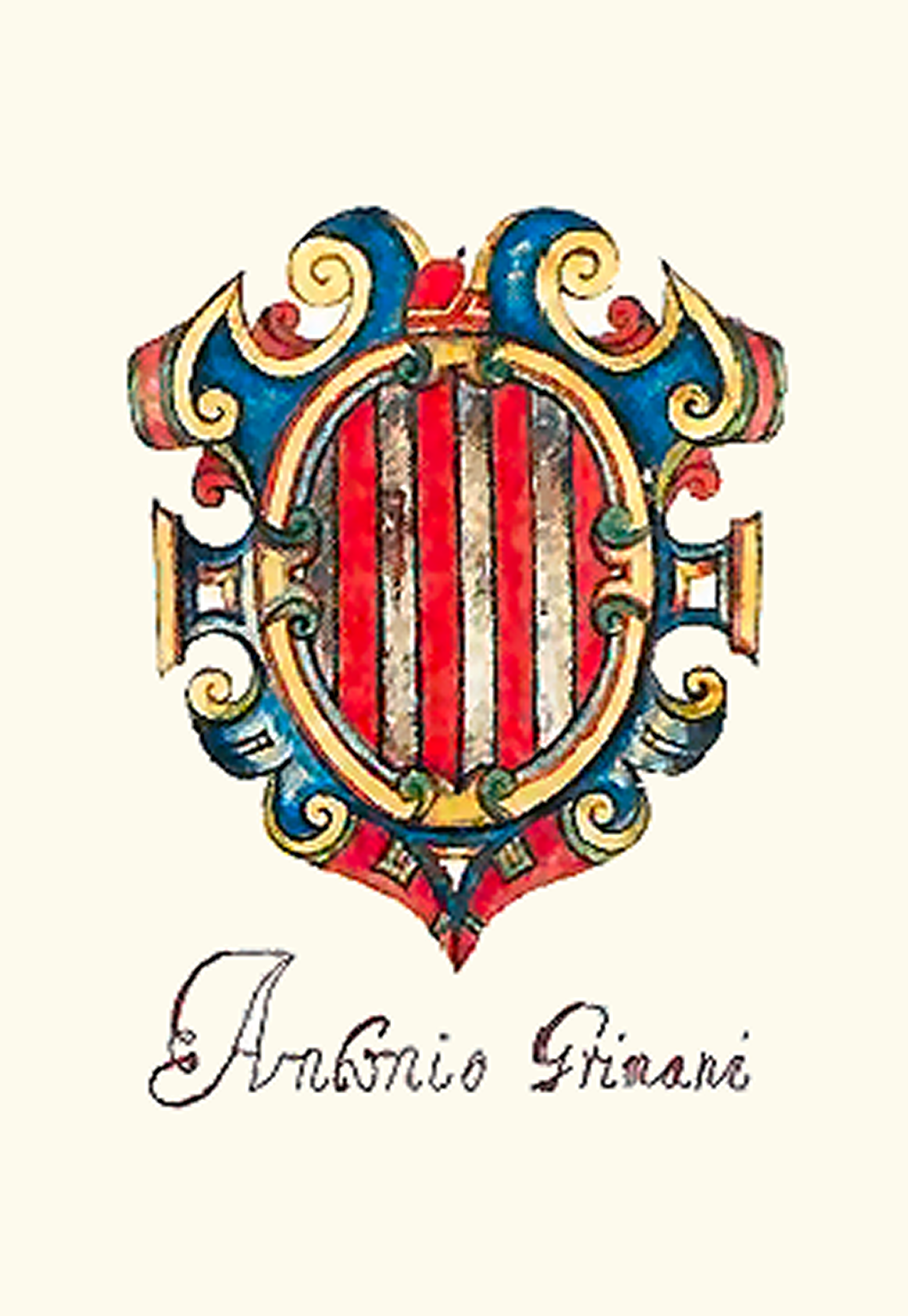
Coat of arms of Antonio Grimani.

Antonio Grimani (28 December 1434 – 7 May 1523) was the Doge of Venice from 1521 to 1523. He had previously served as commander of the Venetian navy. His election at the age of 87 made him one of the oldest people ever elected to head a state.

== Biography ==
He was born in Venice into a relatively poor, but noble Grimani family and in his early years he worked as a tradesman, soon becoming one of the most important ones in the city. In 1494 he was created capitano generale da mar (sea commander-in-chief), a relatively easy task as he had to lead the Venetian operations along the Adriatic coast in a peaceful period. But when in 1499 a new war between Venice and the Ottoman Empire broke out, his lack of experience led to the failure of the Zonchio.

Grimani was threatened with the death penalty, but this was turned into a mild exile on the island of Cherso. Soon, however, he fled taking refuge in Rome in 1509.

Thanks to the intercession of his sons, he could return in Venice in 1509. His political ties soon gained him important administrative charges and created the basis for his future election as doge (6 July 1521).

Aged by the time he assumed the throne, he led the Republic into the Italian War of 1521, the only ally of Francis I of France that did not abandon him. Following the French defeat at the Battle of Bicocca, however, he grew concerned about the course of the war; but he died in 1523, and it was left to his successor, Andrea Gritti, to achieve a settlement with Charles V, Holy Roman Emperor.

He was married to Caterina Loredan. The doge's son, Domenico Grimani, who'd become a cardinal in 1493, survived him by just three months.

== Sources ==
- Norwich, John Julius (1989). A History of Venice. New York: Vintage Books. ISBN 0-679-72197-5..

Political offices
Preceded by Leonardo Loredan	Doge of Venice; 1521–1523	Succeeded by Andrea Gritti
