= Grimani family =

Prominent Venetian patrician family

Grimani coat of arms

The House of Grimani was a prominent Venetian patrician family, including three Doges of Venice. They were active in trade, politics, and later the ownership of theatres and opera-houses.

== Notable members ==
Notable members included:

- Antonio Grimani (1434–1523), Doge 1521–1523
  - Domenico Grimani (1461–1523), son of Antonio; Cardinal and Patriarch of Aquileia; owner of the Grimani Breviary
    - Marino Grimani (c. 1489–1546), nephew of Domenico; Cardinal, bishop and Patriarch of Aquileia
    - Giovanni VI Grimani (1506–1593), nephew of Domenico; an Italian bishop and Patriarch of Aquileia
- Marino Grimani (1532–1605), Doge 1595–1605
- Morosina Morosini-Grimani (1545–1614), dogaressa of Venice by marriage to Doge Marino Grimani
- Antonio Grimani (1557–1628), bishop of Torcello 1587–1622, Apostolic Nuncio to Florence 1605–1616, Patriarch of Aquileia 1622–1628
- Vincenzo Grimani (1652–1710), Cardinal and opera librettist
- Pietro Grimani, Doge 1741–1752
- Giovanni Grimani: translator of Vitruvius
- Giorgio Grimani (fl. 1728), commander of the Venetian Fleet (Latin: Classis Praefectus) in 1728, as recorded on a mural monument on the defensive wall of Corfu Town built by him
- Elisabetta Grimani (d. 1792), dogaressa 1789–1792
- Edmund Grimani Hornby (1825–1896), Chief Judge of the British Supreme Consular Court at Constantinople and British Supreme Court for China and Japan; was descended from the Grimani family on his mother's side

== Structures ==
The following structures are associated with the family:

- Villa Gazzotti Grimani (Vicenza, by Palladio)
- Palazzo Grimani (Grand Canal of Venice)
- Palazzo Civran Grimani
- Grimani Chapel San Francesco della Vigna, Venice
- Teatro Malibran

== Art collectors ==
Cardinal Domenico Grimani was a noted art collector. Many ancient sculptures were found on land the family had purchased on the Quirinal Hill, once site of an ancient Roman bath and garden. He founded the Venice National Archaeological Museum in 1523.

Bishop Giovanni Grimani, nephew of Cardinal Domenico, expanded the Palazzo Grimani di Santa Maria Formosa, where he set up his refined collection of antiques, including sculptures, marbles, vases, bronzes and gems, some of which he inherited from his uncle.

=== The Grimani Breviary ===
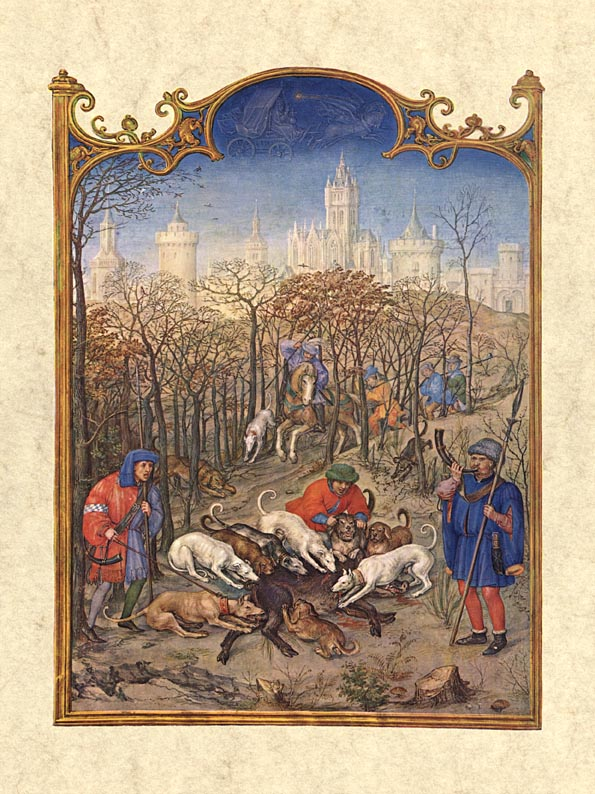
Miniature depicting the month December, from the Grimani Breviary, illuminated by Gerard Horenbout with Alexander and Simon Bening

Long in the library of San Marco and the Biblioteca Marciana, Venice, this breviary is a key work in the late history of Flemish illuminated manuscripts. It was produced in Ghent and Bruges ca. 1515–1520 and by 1520 owned, though possibly not originally commissioned, by Cardinal Domenico Grimani. Several leading artists, including Simon Bening, the Master of James IV of Scotland and Gerard David, contributed some of their finest work to it.

== Theatre entrepreneurs ==
All the main Venetian theatres were owned by important patrician families; combining business with pleasure in the Italian, if not European, city with the most crowded and competitive theatrical culture. When most opera in Europe was still being put on by courts, "economic prospects and a desire for exhibitionistic display", as well a decline in their traditional overseas trading, attracted the best Venetian families to invest in the theatre during the 17th century.

The Grimani were dominant, owning what is now called the Teatro Malibran, then called the Teatro San Giovanni Grisostomo, as well as the San Benedetto theatre, and other houses. The Veniers owned La Fenice, still the main opera house. The Vendramin owned the important Teatro di San Luca or Teatro Vendramin, founded in 1622, later renamed the Teatro Apollo, and since 1875 called the Teatro Goldoni, which still thrives as the city's main theatre for plays, now in a building of the 1720s. In the age of Carlo Goldoni, the greatest Venetian dramatist, only the San Luca and the Malibran still put on spoken drama, and his desertion of the Grimani for the Vendramins at San Luca in 1752 was a major event in the theatrical history of the period, ushering in perhaps his finest period, in which as well as his comedies, he played a significant role in the development of the opera buffa. The Vendramins, who had considerable direct involvement in the management of the theatre, however they did not take their involvement as far as Vincenzo Grimani, who was a cardinal and opera librettist.

== Notes ==
worldcat
