= Domenico Grimani =

Italian nobleman, theologian and cardinal (1461–1523)

His Eminence Domenico Grimani
- Cardinal-Bishop of Porto–Santa Rufina
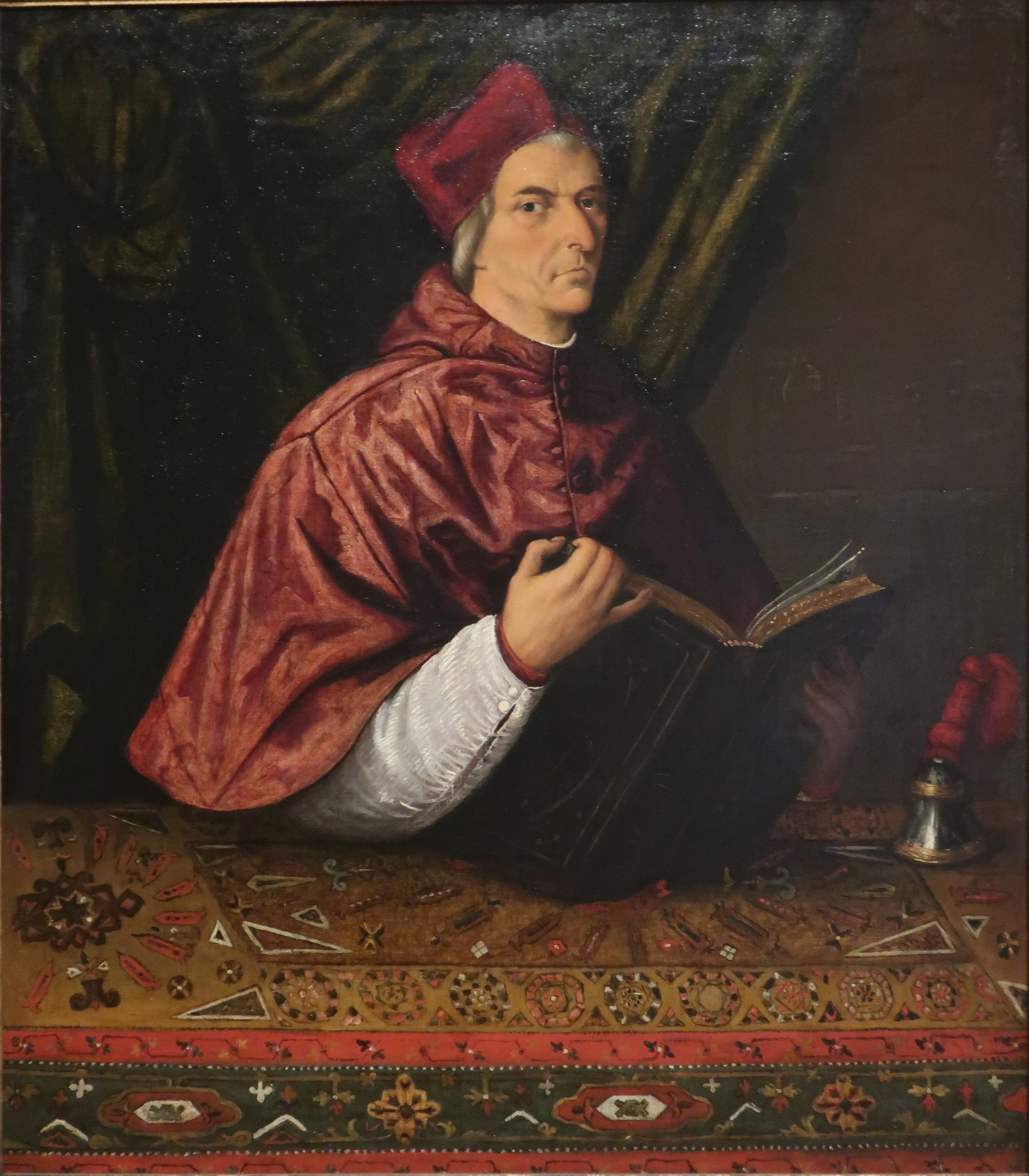
- Church: Catholic Church
- Diocese: Porto–Santa Rufina
- Appointed: 1511
- Term ended: 1523
- Predecessor: Raffaele Riario
- Successor: Francesco Soderini
- Other posts: Cardinal-Priest of San Marco Evangelista al Campidoglio (1503-1523)
- Previous posts: Patriarch of Aquileia (1498-1517); Cardinal-Bishop of Albano (1508-1509); Cardinal-Bishop of Frascati (1509-1511); Administrator of Urbino (1514-1523)

Orders
- Ordination: 1498
- Created cardinal: 20 September 1493 by Pope Alexander VI
- Rank: Cardinal-Bishop

Personal details
- Born: 22 February 1461 Venice, Republic of Venice
- Died: 27 August 1523 (aged 62) Rome, Papal States
- Buried: San Francesco della Vigna

Domenico Grimani (22 February 1461 – 27 August 1523) was an Italian nobleman, theologian and cardinal. Like most noble churchmen of his era, Grimani was an ecclesiastical pluralist, holding numerous posts and benefices.

== Biography ==
Born in Venice, he was the eldest of five sons of Antonio Grimani, Doge of Venice from 1521 to 1523, and Catarina Loredan.

He exhibited an early predilection for humanist studies, which was encouraged by teachers in Venice. Subsequently, in the ambit of the Medicean academy in Florence, he moved in the circle of Lorenzo de' Medici, among scholars like Pico della Mirandola and Poliziano. He obtained a doctorate in canon law at the University of Padua on 23 October 1487, and was elected a senator of Venice that same year.

In 1491 Pope Innocent VIII named him papal secretary and, later, protonotary apostolic. He became a cardinal in 1493, an appointment paid by his father with a sum of around 25,000/30,000 ducats. Grimani was ordained as a priest in 1498. In 1503, he became cardinal priest of San Marco Evangelista al Campidoglio, Rome.

After a period as apostolic administrator in Nicosia, he was Patriarch of Aquileia from 1497, he held the position until he relinquished it in favour of his nephew Marino (later also a cardinal) in 1517. In 1508 he was named cardinal bishop of Albano, and was also the administrator of the diocese of Urbino (from 1514) and bishop of Ceneda (1517–1520). Grimani was already ill in the 1521 conclave, and died a year and a half later; he was buried in the church of Santi Giovanni e Paolo, Rome, but his remains were later moved to San Francesco della Vigna.

== Legacy ==
Grimani was a noted art collector, owning works by artists such as Leonardo da Vinci, Giorgione, Titian, Hans Memling, Hieronymus Bosch, Raphael and others. His collection now forms part of the Museo d'Antichità in the Doge's Palace in Venice, while several of his codexes are in the Archbishop's Library at Udine. The Grimani Breviary, now in the Biblioteca Marciana of Venice, is a key work in the late history of Flemish illuminated manuscripts. It was produced in Ghent and Bruges c. 1515–1520 and by 1520 owned, though possibly not originally commissioned, by Domenico Grimani. Several leading artists, including Simon Bening and Gerard David contributed some of their finest work to it.

Grimani left his collection of Hebrew, Greek, and Latin manuscripts to the religious community at S. Antonio di Castello. Many ancient sculptures were found on land the family had purchased on the Quirinal Hill, once site of an ancient Roman bath and garden.

Grimani also wrote several theological treatises, and translated John Chrysostom's homilies.
