= Caterina Loredan =

- Dogaressa of Venice
- Reign: 1521 - 1523
- Predecessor: Elisabetta Soranzo
- Successor: Maria Pasqualigo
- Born: Venice
- Spouse: Doge Antonio Grimani
- Issue: Domenico Grimani, Piero Grimani, Marino Grimani, Vincenzo Grimani
- Dynasty: House of Loredan

Caterina Loredan of the noble Loredan family was the Dogaressa of Venice from 1521 to 1523 by marriage to Doge Antonio Grimani.

She was a daughter of one Domenico Loredan.

Caterina Loredan and Doge Antonio Grimani had five sons: Cardinal Domenico Grimani (1461–1523), Girolamo Grimani (1466–1515), Piero Grimani (1466–1517), Marino Grimani and Vincenzo Grimani (d. 1535).

Preceded by Elisabetta Soranzo	Dogaressa of Venice; 1521–1523	Maria Pasqualigo
