= Venier =

Venier (Venetian: [veˈnjɛɾ], Italian: [veˈnjɛr]) is a Venetian surname, derived from the Medieval name Venerius. Notable people with the surname include:

- Andrea Venier, castellan of Scutari
- Annibale Venier (born 1951), an Italian rower
- Anton Venier, Austrian luger
- Antonio Venier (c. 1330–1400), Doge of Venice
- Cecilia Venier-Baffo (1525–1583), principal consort and later legal wife of Sultan Selim II
- Francesco Venier, Doge of Venice
- Giacopo Antonio Venier (died 1400), Doge of Venice, called the Cardinal of Cuenca
- Giacopo Venier (1422–1479), Italian cardinal
- Glauco Venier (born 1963), Italian jazz pianist and composer
- Jean-Baptiste Venier (18th-century), French violinist and music publisher
- Mara Venier (born 1950), Italian actress and television presenter
- Marco Venier, Lord of Cerigo (died 1311), Lord of Cerigo
- Marco Venier, Marquess of Cerigo
- Marie Dorion Venier Toupin (ca. 1786–1850), explorer, the only female member of the Pacific Fur Company to the Pacific Northwest in 1810
- Marie Venier (c.1590–1627), French actress
- Maurizio Venier (born 1994), South African
- Nicolò Venier (ca. 1483–1530), Lord of Paros
- Pietro Venier, Governor of Cerigo (died 1372), Governor of Cerigo
- Sebastiano Venier (c. 1496–1578), Doge of Venice
- Simone Venier (born 1984), Italian rower
- Stephanie Venier (born 1993), Austrian World Cup alpine ski racer
- Zuan Francesco Venier (died 1518), Co-Lord of Cerigo

== Other uses ==
- House of Venier, a prominent family in the Republic of Venice
- Casa Venier, a small Gothic-style palace in Campo Santa Maria Formosa, in the Sestiere of Castello, Venice, Italy
- Palazzo Venier-Manfrin, a Baroque-style palace located facing the Cannaregio Canal in the sestiere of Cannaregio of Venice, Italy
- Teatro Venier, prominent in the operatic life of Venice in the 18th and early 19th centuries.
