= Palazzo Donà =

Palazzo Donà may refer to:

- Palazzo Donà Brusa, palaces in Venice, Italy
- Palazzo Donà Balbi, palaces in Venice, Italy
- Palazzo Donà Giovannelli, palaces in Venice, Italy
- Palazzo Donà-Ottobon, palaces in Venice, Italy
- Palazzo Donà della Madoneta, palaces in Venice, Italy
- Palazzo Donà a Sant'Aponal, palaces in Venice, Italy

== See also ==
- Donà
