= Venieri =

Venieri is a surname. Notable people with the surname include:

- House of Venier
- Marco Venieri (disambiguation), multiple people
- Lydia Venieri (born 1964), Greek artist

== See also ==
- VF Venieri, Italian manufacturer of heavy equipment
