= Palazzo Donà Balbi =

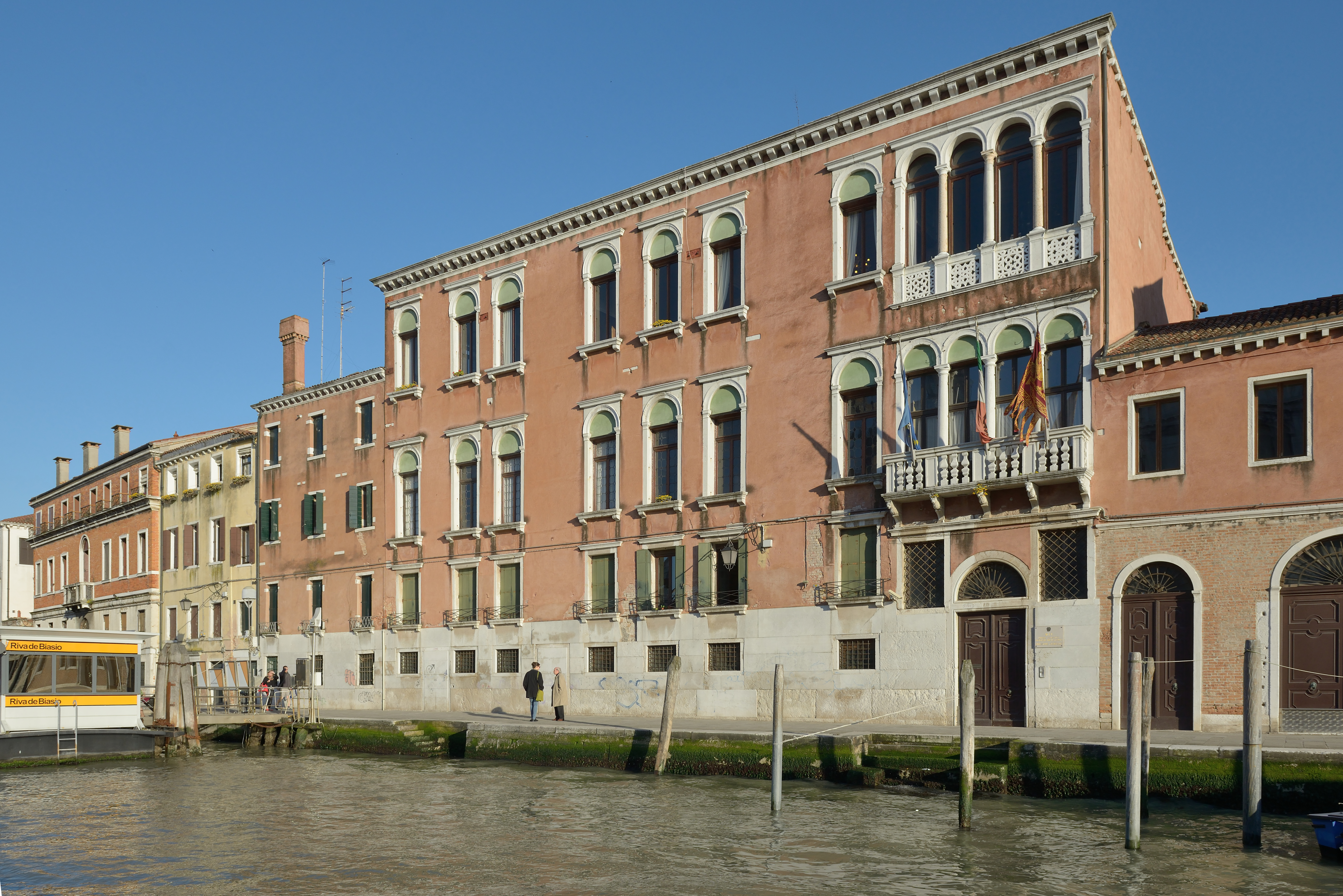
- Palazzo Donà Balbi; facade on Grand Canal.
- Interactive map of the Palazzo Donà Balbi area

General information
- Type: Residential
- Architectural style: Renaissance
- Location: Santa Croce district, Venice, Italy
- Coordinates: 45°26′30.52″N 12°19′31.98″E
- Construction stopped: 17th century

Technical details
- Floor count: 3

Palazzo Donà Balbi is a palace in Venice, Italy, located in the Santa Croce district, overlooking the right side of the Grand Canal on the Riva di Biasio foundation opposite Palazzo Flangini and the church of San Geremia.

== History ==
The building was built in the 17th century—most likely by joining three adjacent buildings. Owned by the Province of Venice, the building is the seat of the regional school office.

== Architecture ==
The simple plastered façade is divided into three vertical parts, the rightmost being the main one and offering the only access door. The noble floors on the right are decorated with quadriforas supported by balconies and flanked by a single-light windows on their left side. The other two parts of the palace feature rows of triplets of single-light window, with those on the left not homogeneously positioned. All the openings are with round arches surmounted by frames. The stone-clad ground floor has signs of two secondary access gates closed over time.

== See also ==
- Palazzo Donà
- Palazzo Donà a Sant'Aponal
- Palazzo Donà Giovannelli
- Palazzo Donà della Madoneta
- Palazzo Donà-Ottobon
