= Palazzo Giovanelli =

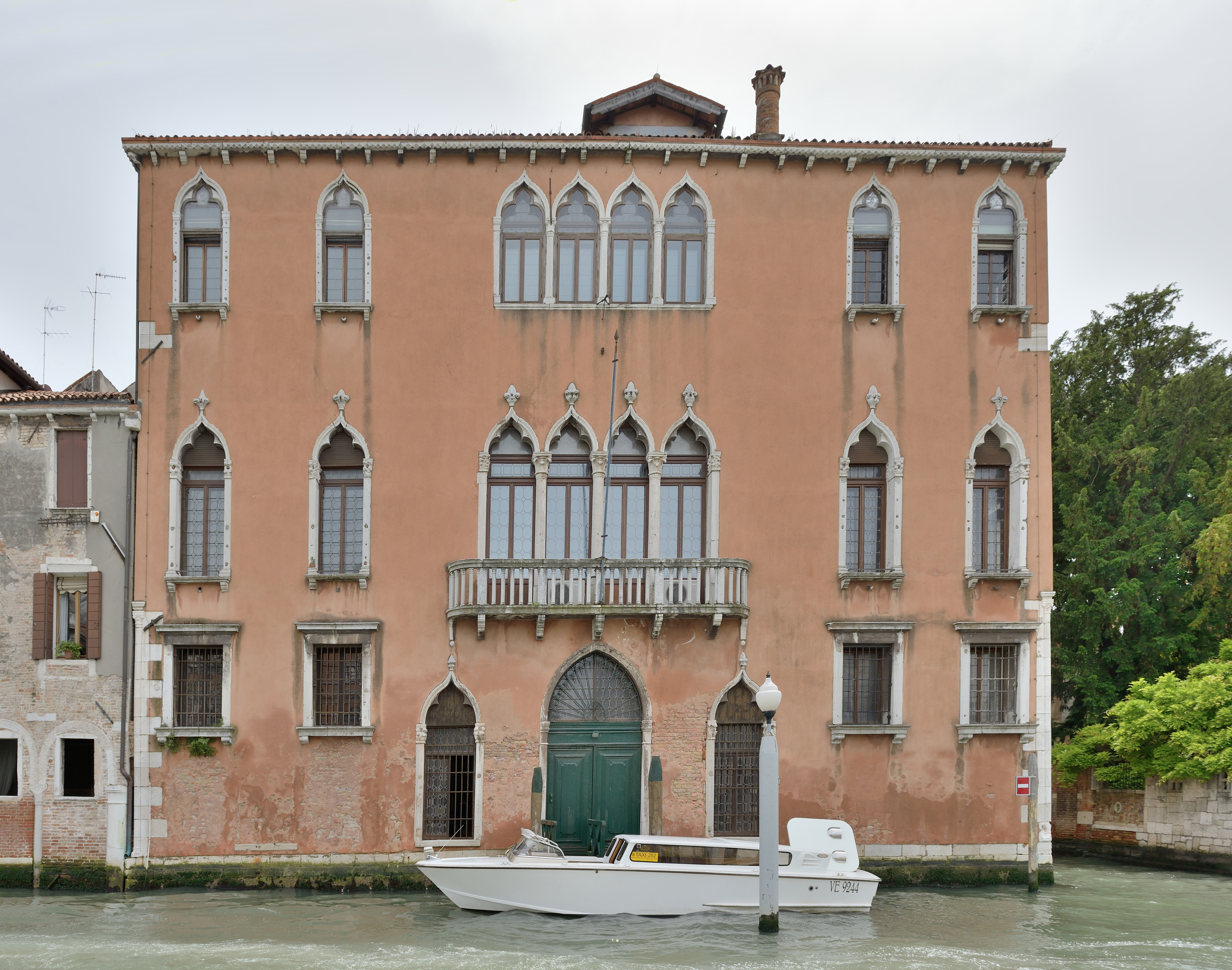
- Palazzo Giovanelli; facade on Grand Canal.
- Interactive map of the Palazzo Giovanelli area
- Alternative names: Palazzo Foscarini Giovanelli

General information
- Type: Residential
- Architectural style: Gothic
- Location: Santa Croce district, Venice, Italy
- Coordinates: 45°26′31.55″N 12°19′39.3″E
- Construction stopped: 15th century

Technical details
- Floor count: 3

Palazzo Giovanelli (also known as Palazzo Foscarini Giovanelli) is a palace in Venice, located in the Santa Croce district, overlooking the right side of the Grand Canal and the Rio di San Giovanni Decollato, before the Fondaco dei Turchi.

== History ==
The palace dates back probably to the mid-15th century. The design is attributed to the architect Filippo Calendario, the designer of Palazzo Ducale. The palazzo has, nevertheless, undergone many renovations over the past centuries; it was almost completely rebuilt in 1847-48 by the architect Giovanni Battista Meduna. These interventions are visible on the side of the building facing the Rio Fosca river; they resulted in the mix of Gothic, late Renaissance, neo-Gothic style openings.

Giovanni Battista Donà, a member of one of the most important Venetian families, was an initial owner. Then the building was donated by the Republic to Francesco Maria della Rovere, Duke of Urbino in 1538, who passed the ownership to the Giovannelli family as a debt payment. The Giovanellis were originally from Bergamasco and became wealthy via investing in mines in Hungary. They bought the noble title in 1668, paying the enormous sum of 100,000 ducats to the Serenissima.

== Architecture ==
The palazzo has three levels, including the ground floor. The noble floors are decorated with quadriforas flanked by pairs of single-light windows. The lower quadrifora is supported by a balustrade. The interiors were created by Meduna in the same period as the restoration of the Ca' d'Oro took place and were inspired by the neo-Gothic style. The interior rooms have coffered ceilings, stuccos, and marble chimneys. Also a very rich collection of art objects including La tempesta by Giorgione and Ritratto dell'Inglese by Titian was kept in the palace.

== See also ==
- Palazzo Donà Giovannelli
