= Marco Venieri =

Marco Venieri or Venier may refer to:

- Marco Venier, Marquess of Cerigo
- Marco Venier, Lord of Cerigo (died 1311)
