= Palazzo Donà Brusa =

Coordinates: 45.4366°N 12.3316°E

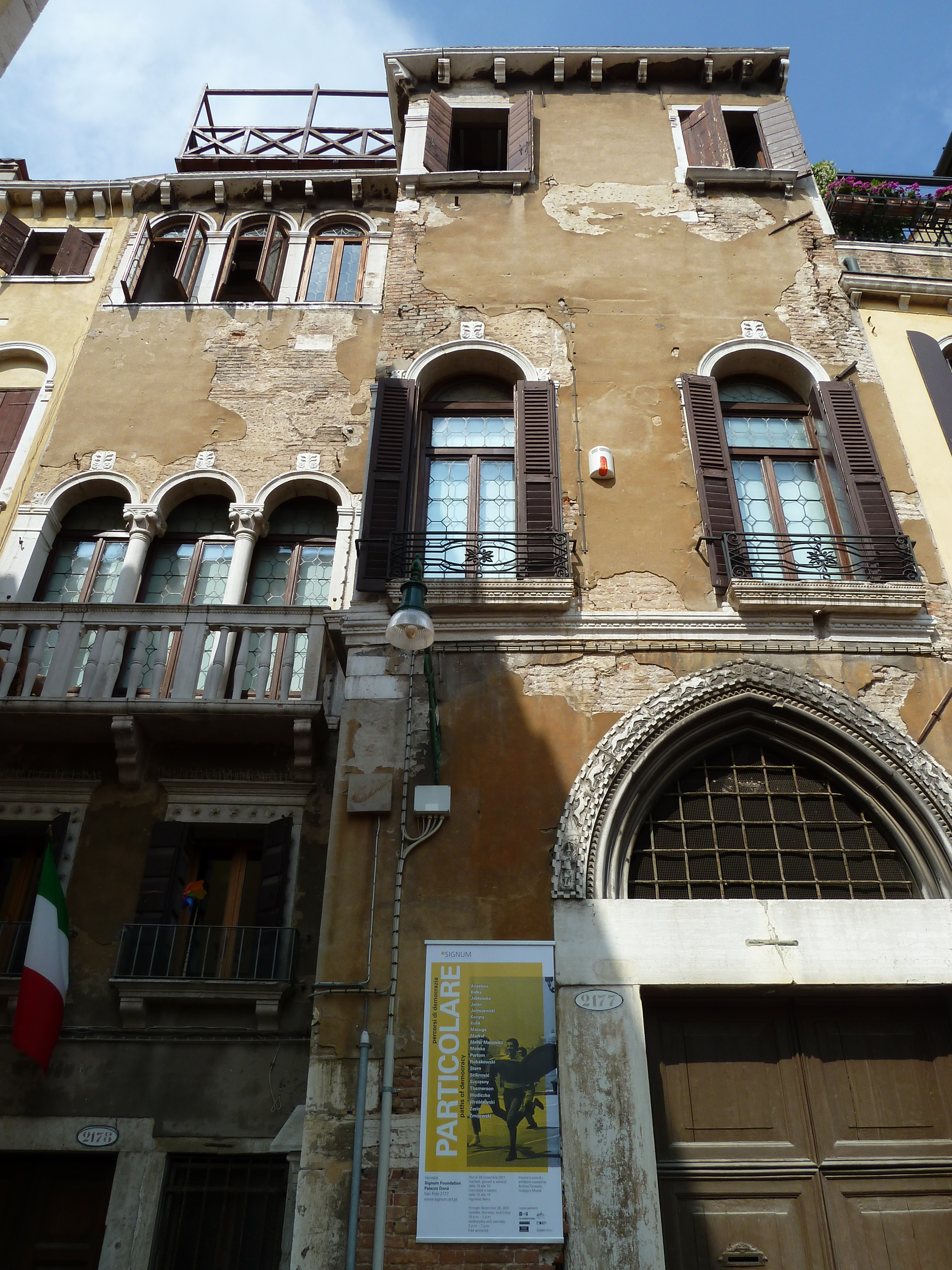
Palazzo Donà a San Polo in 2011

The Palazzo Donà or Donà Brusa is a Venetian Gothic style palace located in Campo San Polo in the Sestiere of San Polo in Venice, Italy.

The palace was originally built by the old aristocratic Donà family, originally from Aquileia. Three members of the family, Francesco, Leonardo, and Nicolo became Doges.

The composer Giovanni Francesco Brusa, a collaborator with Carlo Goldoni, lived in the palace.

The palace is now owned by the Signum Foundation, which sponsors exhibitions from Polish and foreign contemporary artists.

There are four other Dona palaces in Venice: the Palazzo Donà della Madoneta on the Grand Canal; the Palazzo Donà-Ottobon in Fondamenta San Severo in Castello; Palazzo Donà Balbi in Santa Croce; and the Palazzo Donà dalle Rose in Cannaregio.
