= Palazzo Donà Giovannelli =

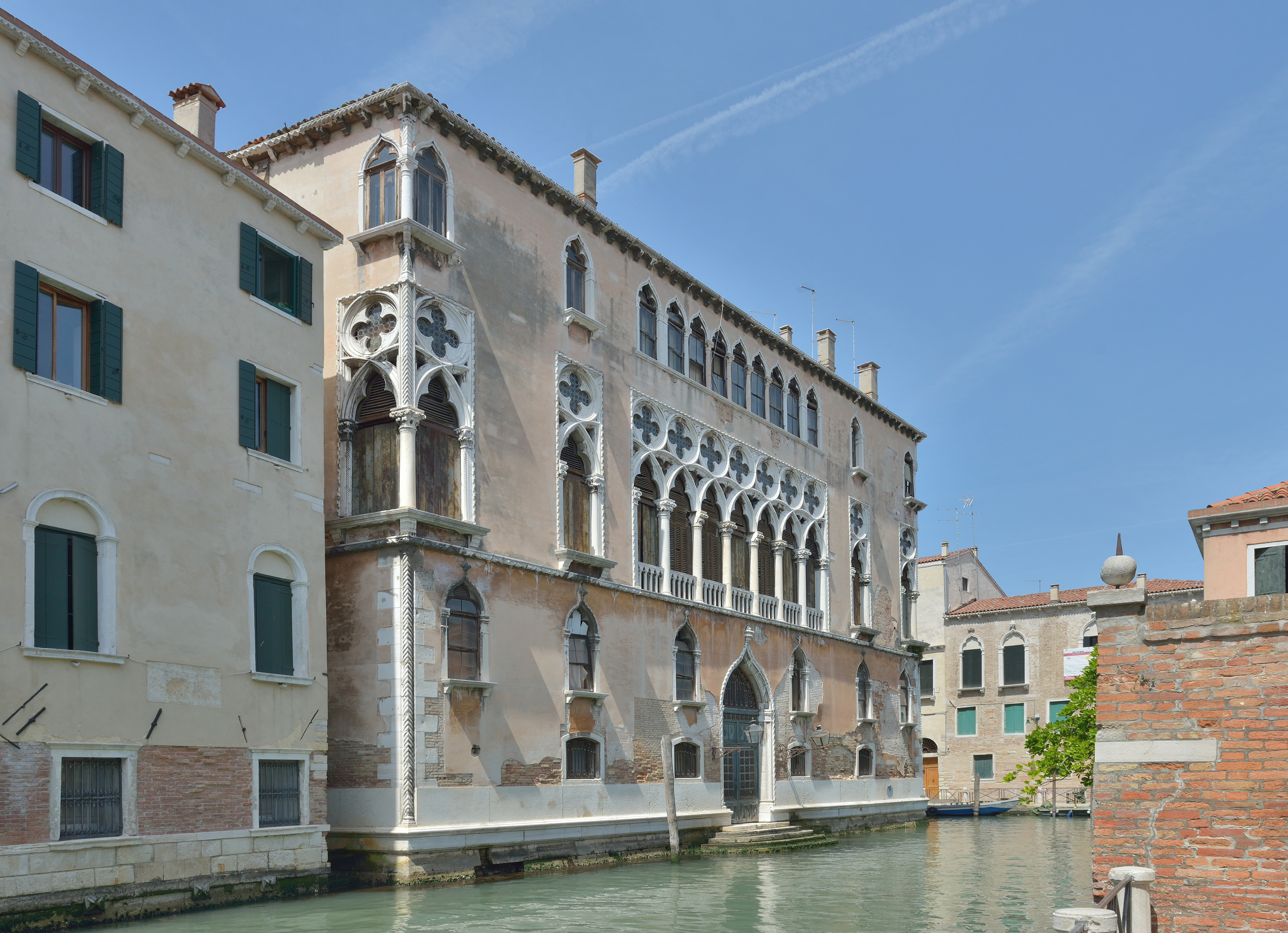
- Palazzo Donà Giovannelli; facade on Rio di Noale.
- Interactive map of the Palazzo Donà Giovannelli area

General information
- Type: Residential
- Architectural style: Gothic
- Location: Cannaregio district, Venice, Italy
- Coordinates: 45°26′33.11″N 12°19′58.94″E
- Construction stopped: 15th century
- Renovated: 1847–1848

Technical details
- Floor count: 3

Design and construction
- Architect: attributed to Filippo Calendario

Palazzo Donà Giovannelli is a civil building located in the city of Venice, Italy in the Cannaregio district. The palace neighbors Palazzo Pasqualigo Giovannelli and overlooks the Rio di Noale and the Rio di Santa Fosca. In 2026, the palace was converted to the Orient Express Venezia hotel.

== History ==
The designer of the palazzo is unknown but may be attributed to Filippo Calendario, the architect of Doge's Palace. In 1538 the palace was owned by Francesco Maria I Della Rovere, Duke of Urbino, then it became the property of Giovanni Battista Donà, who was, however, forced sell it to the Giovannelli family to cover his debts. The building has been substantially renovated and altered several times: initially by Giovanni Battista Meduna between 1847 and 1848 and then in the middle of the 20th century.

== Exteriors ==
The building locates at the confluence of two canals and has two facades. The side on the Rio di Noale or Noal has a monumental façade of the late-Gothic style. The ground floor has an impressive water portal and is decorated by small arched lancet windows, while the two noble floors offer heptaforas and numerous other openings. The most valuable and visible elements of this façade are the balustraded polifora of the first noble floor and the angular mullioned windows at the both edges of the structure.

The façade on the Rio di Santa Fosca, despite being about 40 meters long and facing an important waterway, is simpler than the previous one. Renovated several times, this façade appears to be a mix of several styles: Gothic, late Renaissance, and neo-Gothic. The only element of importance is the polifora of the main hall. There is a garden on the back side of the palazzo.

== Interiors ==
The palace is planned around a large central courtyard, which is accessed through a monumental portal. An octagonal staircase leads to the noble floor. The building also has two other staircases, also leading from the courtyard, but of a more traditional style. The noble floor is characterized by the absence of the central portego, a typical feature of many Venetian palaces. The floor is instead subdivided into a multitude of smaller rooms, decorated with stuccos, chests of drawers, and fireplaces. The interiors have been completely redesigned by Giovanni Battista Meduna. Once the palace housed important artworks—such as The Tempest by Giorgione.

== See also ==
- Palazzo Donà
- Palazzo Donà-Ottobon
- Palazzo Giovanelli
