= Palazzo Papadopoli =

16th Century palace in Venice

Coordinates: 45°26′12″N 12°19′55″E

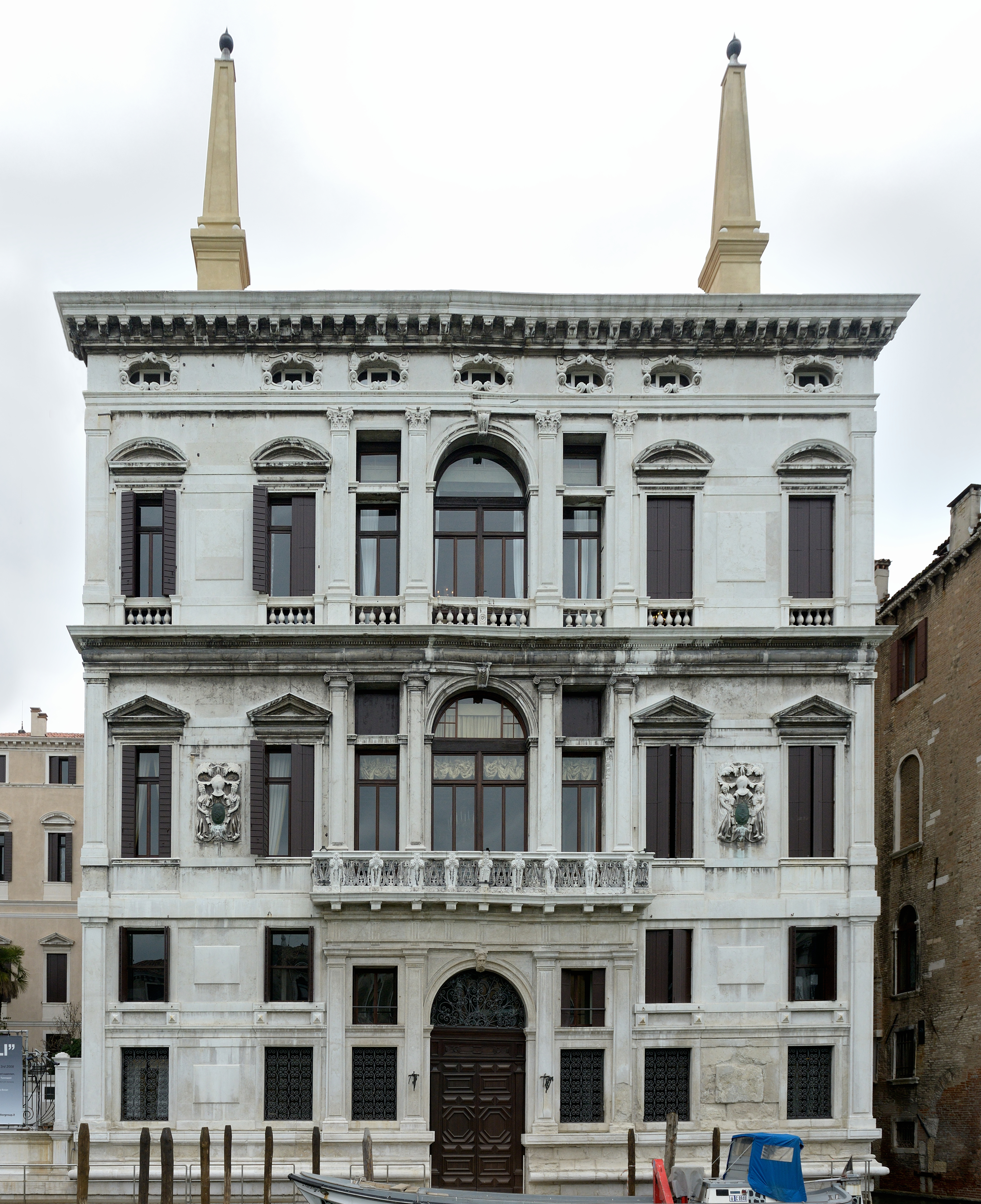
Palazzo Papadopoli

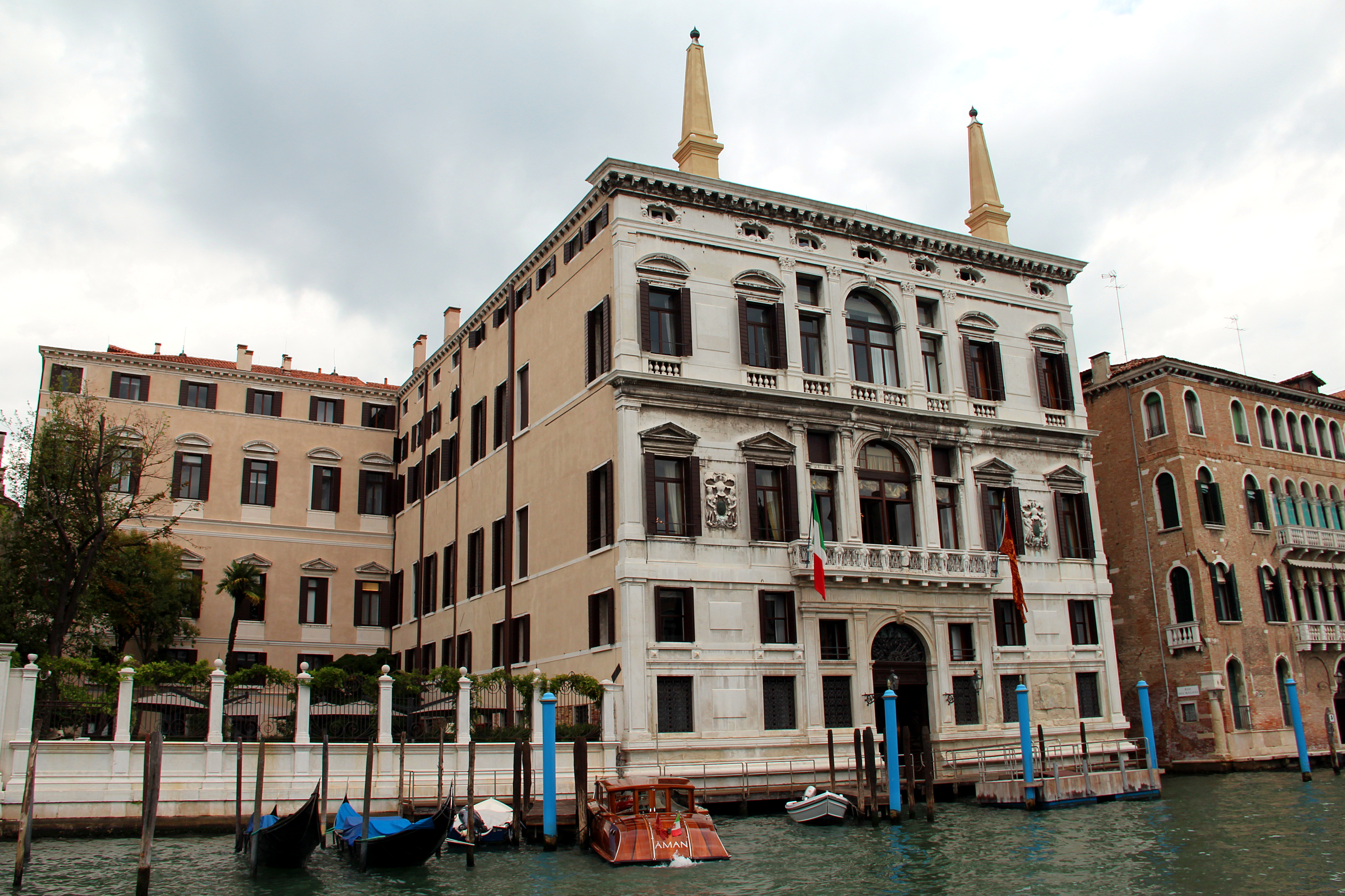
Papadopoli Palace seen from Canal Grande.

The Palazzo Papadopoli, also known as the Palazzo Coccina or Palazzo Coccina Tiepolo Papadopoli, is a Baroque-style palace located on the Canal Grande of Venice, between Palazzo Giustinian Businello and Palazzo Donà a Sant'Aponal in the Sestiere of San Polo, Venice, Italy. The opposite building is the Palazzo Corner Contarini dei Cavalli.

== History ==
The palace was commissioned in the middle of the 16th century by the Coccina family from the architect Giangiacomo dei Grigi, son of Guglielmo dei Grigi. This family from Bergamo had recently joined the Venetian patriciate. The palace was complete by 1570.

In 1748, the palace came to hands of the Tiepolo family. In 1745, the palace and remaining painting collection was sold to the elector of Saxony for 100,000 zecchini. The paintings were moved to the Gemäldegalerie Alte Meister of Dresden. In the 1700s, the piano nobile was decorated by Giandomenico Tiepolo with frescoes of The charlatan and The Minuette . His father, Giambattista Tiepolo circa 1750, also putatively painted one ceiling.

The palace changed hands during 19th century from Valentino Comello in 1837, whose wife Maddalena Montalban was jailed by the Austrians for a year; to Bartholomäus von Stürmer, Austrian general and diplomat; in 1864 to rich bankers and counts of Greek origin Niccolò and Angelo Papadopoli. The later bought a lot of adjacent buildings to create the large garden with a wing behind it. The family hailed from Corfu and had entered the patriciate in 1791. Between 1874-1875, it housed Girolamo Levi, who along with Michelangelo Guggenheim and Cesare Rotta completed a Neoclassical refurbishment with gardens. Rotta frescoed the ballroom. In 1922, it was inherited by the family of Arrivabene Valenti Gonzaga. The palace was converted into a luxury hotel run by Aman Resorts, named Aman Venice. It opened in 2013 and was the first Aman resort in Italy.

== Sources ==
- Guida d'Italia – Venezia ed. Milano, Touring Editore, 2007. ISBN 978-88-365-4347-2.
- Brusegan, Marcello (2007). Newton & Compton (ed.). I palazzi di Venezia. Roma. pp. 62–64. ISBN 978-88-541-0820-2. Brusegan.
- Fasolo, Andrea (2003). Arsenale editrice (ed.). Palazzi di Venezia. pp. 76–77. ISBN 978-88-7743-295-7. Fasolo.
- Boulton, Susie; Catling, Christopher (1997). Mondadori (ed.). Venezia e il Veneto. p. 64. ISBN 978-88-04-43092-6. Boulton e Catling.
