= Albanian–Venetian War =

Part of the Albanian–Turkish Wars; 1447 to 1448

Albanian-Venetian War of 1447–48 Lufta Shqiptaro-Veneciane
- Part of the Albanian–Ottoman Wars (1432–1479)
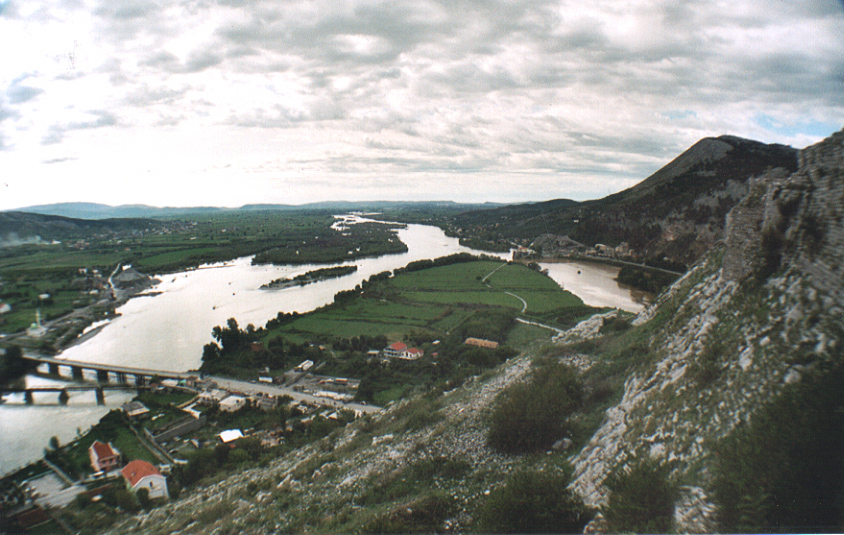
- Rivers Drin and Buna in Shkodër as seen from Rozafa Castle, the former Venetian fortress.
Date	December 1447 – 4 October 1448
Location	Albania
Result	See aftermath
Territorial changes	Venetian forces are defeated outside of Shkodër and are forced to make a truce. Dagnum stays under Venetian control. All lands on the Albanian side of the Drin river are relinquished to the League of Lezhë.

Belligerents
League of Lezhë	Republic of Venice; Ottoman Empire

Commanders and leaders
Skanderbeg; Vrana Konti; Hamza Kastrioti	(Republic of Venice) Daniele Jurichi (Republic of Venice) Andrea Venier (Ottoman Empire) Mustafa Pasha (POW)

Strength
9,000 concentrated against the Venetians under Skanderbeg. 6,000 fought against the Turks, 3,000–4,000 of which were placed beforehand in Dibra under Vrana Konti to hold off a possible Ottoman incursion.	15,000 Venetian soldiers and local mercenaries stationed in the area of Shkodër; small numbers of soldiers stationed in Durrës and Lezha. 15,000 Ottoman soldiers were sent to Dibra.

Casualties and losses
400 killed	Venetian: 2,500 killed; 1,000 captured; Ottoman : 5,000 killed or wounded; 300 prisoners

The Albanian–Venetian War of 1447–48 (Albanian: Lufta Shqiptaro-Veneciane) was waged between Venetian and Ottoman forces against the Albanians under George Kastrioti Skanderbeg. The war was the result of a dispute between the Republic of Venice and the Dukagjini family over the possession of the Dagnum fortress. Skanderbeg, then ally of the Dukagjini family, moved against several Venetian held towns along the Albanian coastline, in order to pressure the Venetians into restoring Dagnum. In response, the Republic sent a local force to relieve the besieged fortress of Dagnum, and urged the Ottoman Empire to send an expeditionary force into Albania. At that time the Ottomans were already besieging the fortress of Svetigrad, stretching Skanderbeg's efforts thin.

However, the League of Lezhë defeated both the Venetian forces and the Ottoman expedition. The League won over the Venetian forces on 23 July 1448 at the gates of Scutari, and over the Ottomans three weeks later, on 14 August 1448, at the Battle of Oronichea. The Republic was, thereafter, left with few soldiers to defend Venetian Albania. As a result, the League soon signed peace with the Republic of Venice, while continuing the war against the Ottoman Empire. After the Albanian–Venetian War of 1447–1448, Venice did not seriously challenge Skanderbeg or the League, allowing Skanderbeg to focus his campaigns against the Ottoman Empire.

== Background ==
In 1444, Skanderbeg had managed to unite the major Albanian princes under his leadership at the League of Lezhë, where a confederation of all the Albanian Principalities was created. Stresses within the alliance were felt, when Nicholas Dukagjini, a member of the Dukagjini family, a powerful family in northern Albania, ambushed and killed Lekë Zaharia Altisferi, prince of Dagnum and also League member. Since Zaharia had no children, he organised the killing to more easily gain Dagnum. The year in which Zaharia was killed is not recorded. A Venetian document dated to 4 January 1445, mentions Zaharia as the former lord of Dagnum which was given to Boxia, Zaharia's mother. The Venetian chronicler Stefano Magno says that Zaharia was killed close to the advent of the year 1445.

The two princes had been in dispute over who should marry Irene Dushmani, the only daughter of Lekë Dushmani, prince of Zadrima. In 1445, the Albanian princes had been invited to the wedding of Skanderbeg's younger sister, Mamica, who was being married to Muzaka Thopia. Irene entered the wedding and hostilities began. Dukagjini asked Irene to marry him, but Zaharia, who was drunk, saw this, and assaulted Dukagjini. Some princes attempted to stop the fight, but only more people became involved. Several people died or got injured before peace was established. Neither of the two antagonists had suffered any physical harm, but after the event Dukagjini was morally humiliated.

The death of Zaharia left his princedom with no successor. As a result, his mother handed the fortress over to Venetian Albania, a stretch of possessions of the Republic of Venice. Skanderbeg urged the Venetian legates that Dagnum (along with Sati, Gladri and Dushmani which had been taken by Venice) should be restored to the League since it guarded an important trade route, but Venice refused and, consequently, Skanderbeg prepared for war against the Republic itself.

The League soon sent envoys to its neighbours, Stefan I Crnojević and Đurađ Branković. Branković, a lord of Serbian Despotate, who was also in dispute with Venice over the Principality of Zeta, expressed his willingness to help Skanderbeg against the Republic but not against the Ottoman Empire. The Venetians sent an ambassador to Skanderbeg offering him 1,000 ducats to lay aside all claims to Dagnum in return for whicht the Albanians would protect the country and keep the roads free from violence. Skanderbeg, however, refused to accept the offer and hostilities continued. Alongside the Spani family, the Dushmani family was against the war with Venice and did not participate in it.

== Initial campaigns ==
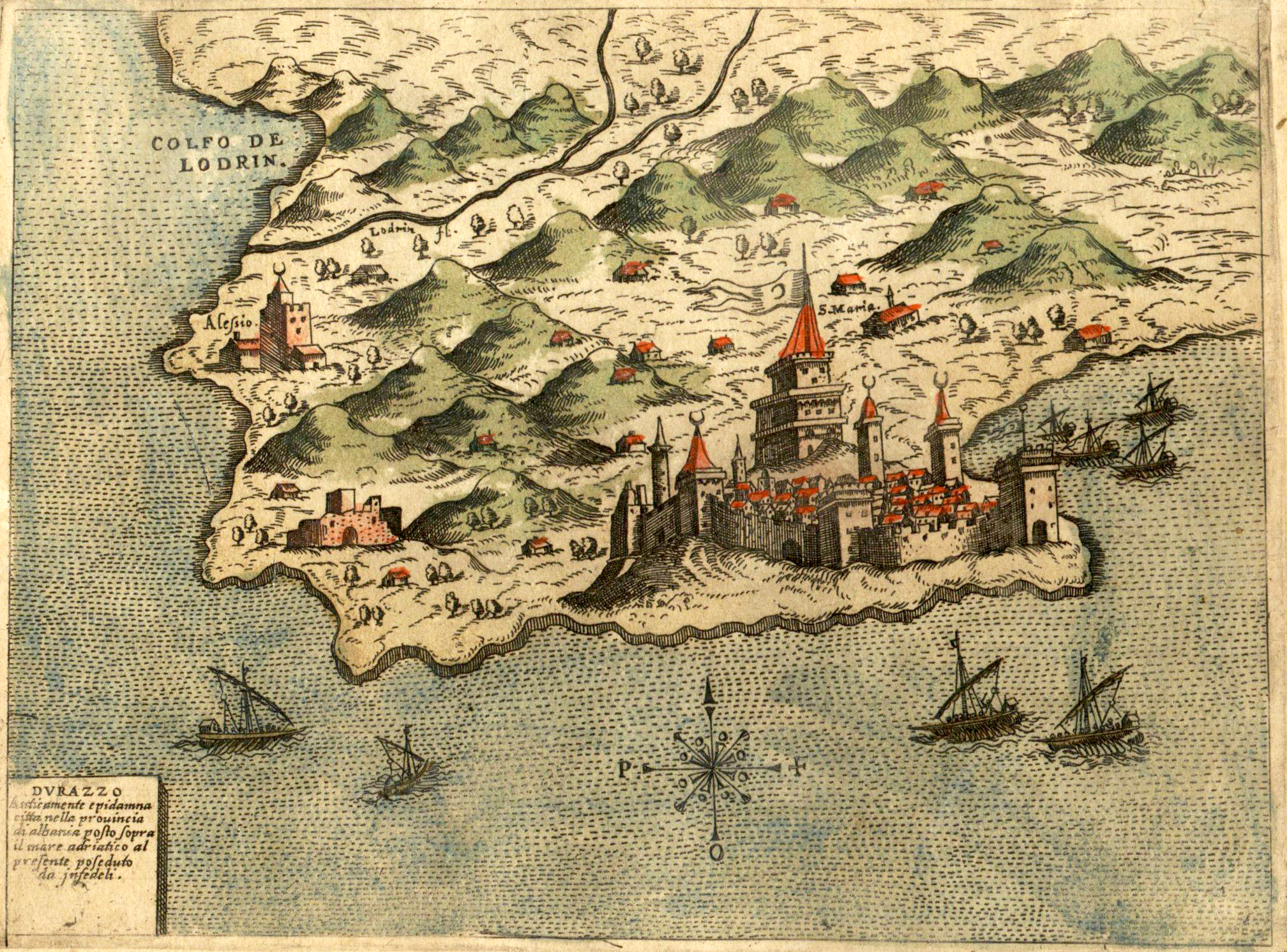
Durrës in 1573.

In December 1447, after leaving a protective force of three to four thousand men under Vrana Konti to guard the frontier in the event of an Ottoman incursion, Skanderbeg turned towards Dagnum with a force of 14,000 men. Initially offering the garrison at Dagnum the opportunity to surrender, he promptly besieged the fortress upon rejection. In order to put pressure on the Venetians, Skanderbeg also turned towards Durazzo, then another possession of Venetian Albania, and cut off the city off from its local resources and trade. This move forced Venice to redirect to Durazzo two galleys, which initially were bound for Crete, in order to watch over the events there.

By then Venice treated Skanderbeg as a rebellious Ottoman vassal, so on 4 March 1448 a life pension of 100 gold ducats per month was offered to anyone who would assassinate Skanderbeg. In May, Ottoman forces besieged Svetigrad, putting great strain on Skanderbeg's campaigns. On 27 June 1448 Venice sent Andrea Venier, then provveditore at Scutari's Rozafa Castle, to attempt to persuade the Ottomans to invade Albania. After, Venice also sent Venier to meet with Skanderbeg in order to convince him to break off hostilities, and also attempted to push the Dukagjini clan away from their alliance with Skanderbeg. Despite measures taken by the Venetians, Skanderbeg marched towards Scutari unabated. He also dared the Venetians to send out a force to defeat him. The siege of Dagnum continued, however, with a force of 4,000 that Skanderbeg had left behind.

== Battle of the River Drin ==
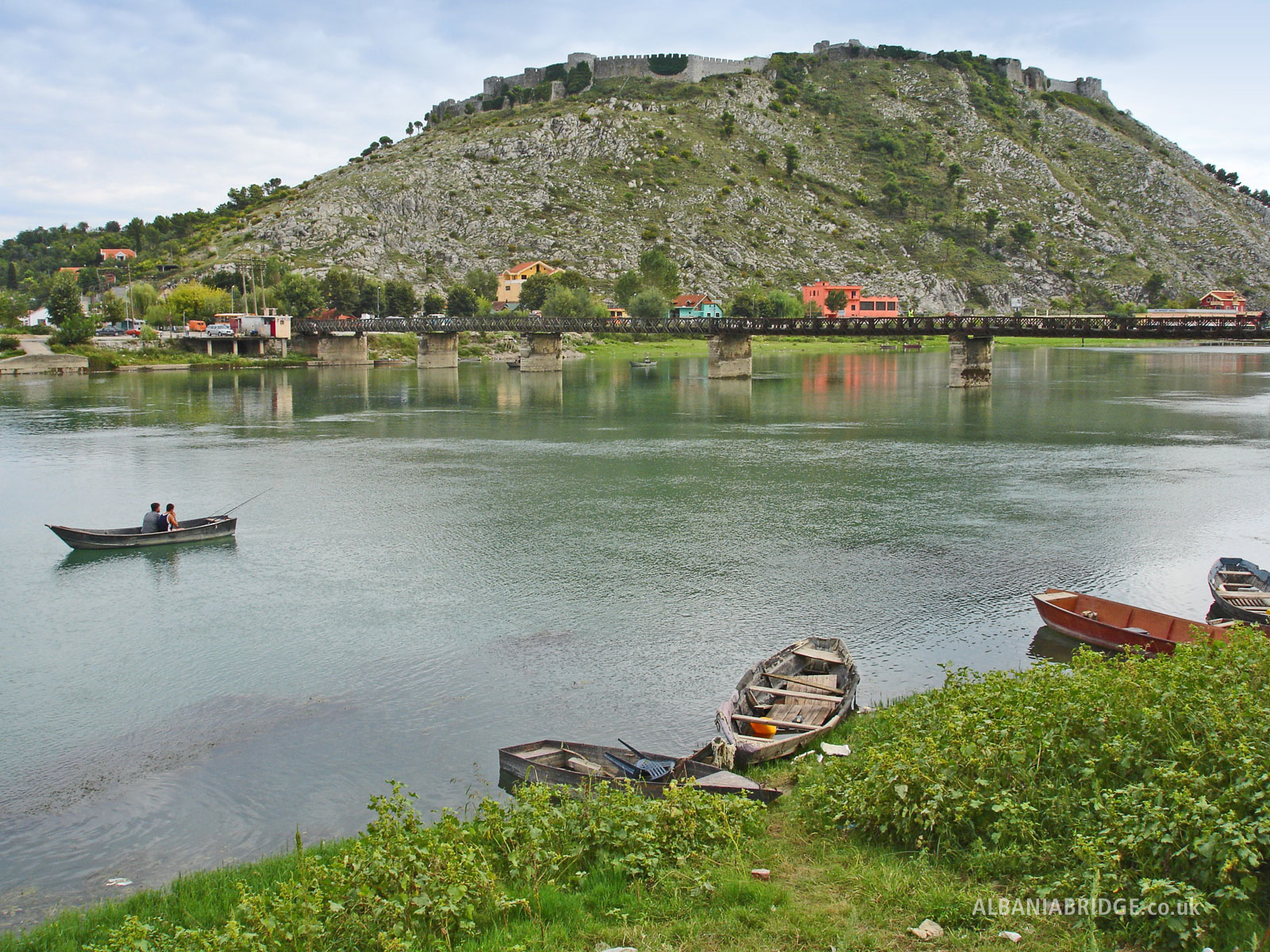
Rozafa Castle in 2006.

On 23 July 1448 Skanderbeg crossed the Drin River with 10,000 men, meeting a Venetian force of 15,000 men under the command of Daniele Iurichi, governor of Scutari. Venetian forces were composed largely of local mercenaries, forming the center of Iurichi's line. They included forces under Koja and Andreas Humoj, Simeon Vulkata, Vasilije Ugrin, Zapa family (Jovan and his brother), Pedantari family (seven Pedantari brothers and many other), Moneta family (three sons of Rajko Moneta), Malonši family (Petar with his two sons), and Buša Sornja who were pronoiars. Iurichi positioned himself on the left wing with his Dalmatian forces, while the right was composed of Italian natives. Skanderbeg positioned himself and his personal bodyguard on the right wing, opposite Iurichi. The center of Skanderbeg's army was commanded by Tanush Thopia, and the right by Moses of Dibra.

Skanderbeg instructed his troops on what to expect and opened battle by ordering a force of archers to open fire on the Venetian line. Soon, the Albanian right wing advanced to engage first and managed to push the Venetian left wing back, while the centre and the right engaged the Venetian center and left. The breakthrough was soon accomplished by attacking the gaps in the Venetian lines, causing disorder among their ranks. The battle continued for hours until large groups of Venetian troops began to flee. Skanderbeg, seeing his fleeing adversaries, ordered a full-scale offensive, routing the entire Venetian army. The Republic's soldiers were chased right to the gates of Scutari, and Venetian prisoners were thereafter paraded outside the fortress.

The Albanians managed to inflict 2,500 casualties on the Venetian force, capturing 1,000. Skanderbeg's army suffered 400 casualties, most on the right wing. The Venetian presence in Albania was weakened and the garrisons in the cities were stretched thin.

Skanderbeg retreated from the area to fight off an Ottoman invasion. Before leaving, he garrisoned the fort of Baleci (Balsha) near Dagnum, under the command of Marin Spani. Andrea Venier ordered the capture of Baleci after Skanderbeg had left, forcing Marin Spani to evacuate it. Venier then burned it to the ground. In retaliation, Hamza Kastrioti, one of Spani's colleagues, attacked a nearby Venetian fortress with what little men he had, but was defeated.

== Battle of Oranik ==
Despite the setbacks while he was away, Skanderbeg continued to focus on campaigning against the Venetian-requested Ottoman incursion at the Battle of Oranik in August 1448. The Ottoman expeditionary force was crushed on 14 August, with Ottoman commander Mustafa Pasha captured. The loss of Balsha to the Venetians, however, forced Skanderbeg to continue raiding Venetian territory.

== Aftermath ==
With Durazzo, Scutari, and Dagnum on the point of surrender and seeing a victorious Albanian army after the Battle of Oronichea, the Venetians sent Andrea Venier to open peace negotiations with the Albanians. The conference was held in Alessio and peace was signed by Skanderbeg and George Arianiti who represented the other princes on 4 October 1448. The signatories agreed that Venice would keep Dagnum. In return, the Venetians agreed that Skanderbeg would receive an annual pension of 1,400 ducats and an annual tax exemption for 200 horse loads of salt from Durazzo. An agreement was also made to establish trading privileges between Arianiti, Skanderbeg's ally, and Venice. Furthermore, a refuge in Venice would be offered in case Skanderbeg was driven out of Albania and two scarlet garments would be given to Skanderbeg in exchange for two altered falcons from the Albanian. However, threats were still exchanged between both sides and unofficial skirmishing continued.

Wary of Skanderbeg, Venice no longer openly challenged him. Another treaty was signed in 1463, when Venice went to war with the Turks. However, no peace was made between the Ottomans and Skanderbeg until 1463, before the Ottoman-Venetian war was of the same year, who retreated to Macedonia and prepared for another invasion of Albania after their defeat at Oronichea. During the Albanian-Venetian war, they had taken Svetigrad after several months of siege. Thence, they could cross into Albania uninhibited.

== Sources ==
- Fine, John Van Antwerp (1994), The Late Medieval Balkans: A Critical Survey from the Late Twelfth Century to the Ottoman Conquest, University of Michigan Press, ISBN 978-0-472-08260-5
- Francione, Gennaro (2003), Skenderbeu: Një hero modern (in Albanian), Shtëpia botuese "Naim Frashëri", ISBN 99927-38-75-8
- Franco, Demetrio (1539), Comentario de le cose de' Turchi, et del S. Georgio Scanderbeg, principe d' Epyr, Altobello Salkato, ISBN 99943-1-042-9
- Frashëri, Kristo (2002), Gjergj Kastrioti Skënderbeu: jeta dhe vepra, 1405–1468 (in Albanian), Botimet Toena, ISBN 99927-1-627-4
- Hodgkinson, Harry (1999), Scanderbeg: From Ottoman Captive to Albanian Hero, Centre for Albanian Studies, ISBN 978-1-873928-13-4
- Myrdal, Jan (1976), Albania defiant, Monthly Review Press, ISBN 978-0-85345-356-7
- Nicol, MacGillivray Nicol (1993), The last centuries of Byzantium, 1261–1453, Cambridge University Press, ISBN 0-521-43991-4
- Noli, Fan Stilian (1947), George Castroiti Scanderbeg (1405–1468), International Universities Press, OCLC 732882
- O'Connell, Monique (2009), Men of empire: power and negotiation in Venice's maritime state, JHU Press, ISBN 978-0-8018-9145-8
- Schmitt, Oliver Jens (2001), Das venezianische Albanien (1392–1479), München: R. Oldenbourg Verlag GmbH München, ISBN 3-486-56569-9
- Schmitt, Oliver Jens (2009), Skënderbeu (in Albanian), K&B Tiranë, ISBN 978-99956-667-5-0
