= Palazzo Corner Contarini dei Cavalli =

Building in Venice, Italy

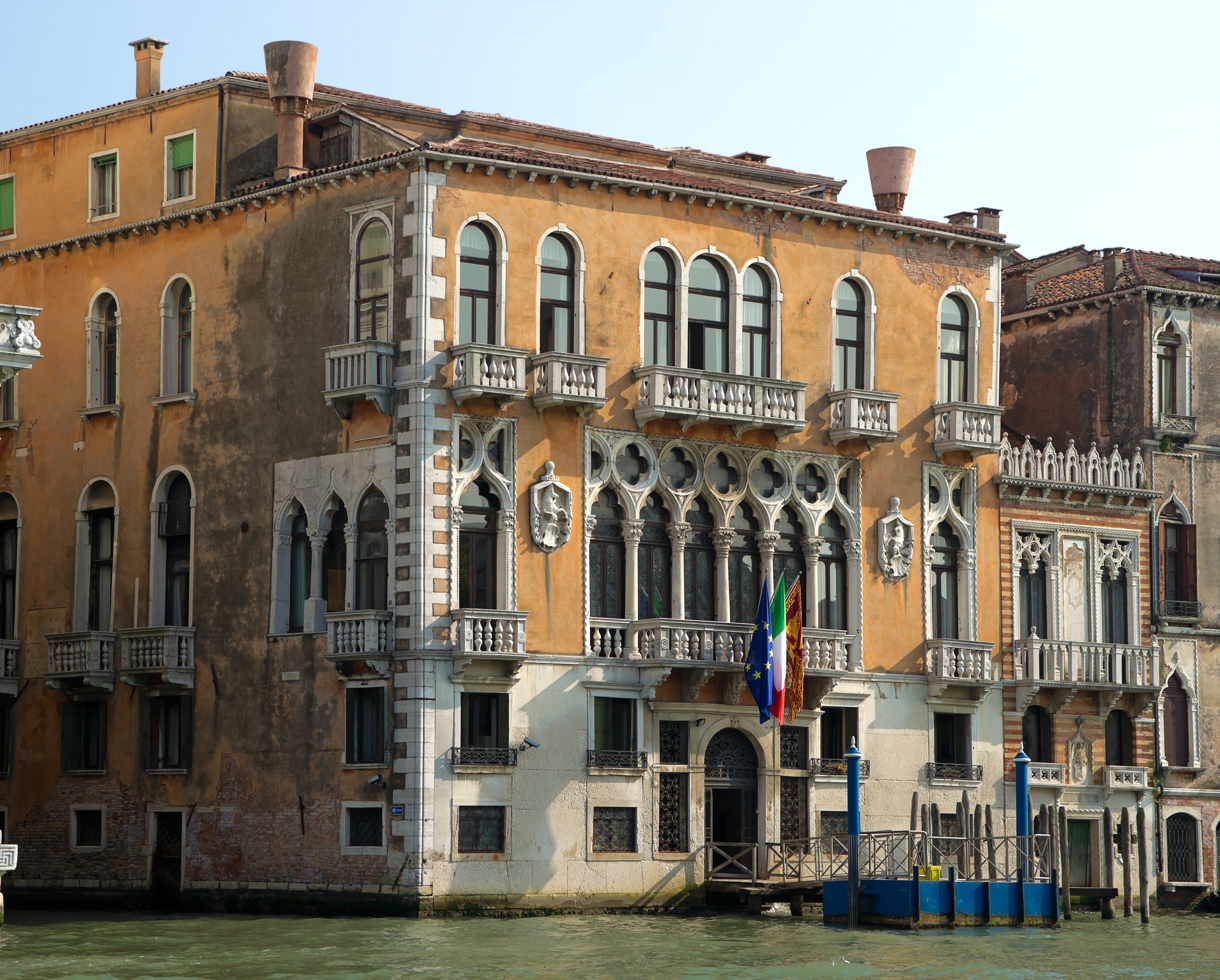
- Palazzo Corner Contarini dei Cavalli, a view from Grand Canal
- Interactive map of the Palazzo Corner Contarini dei Cavalli area

General information
- Type: Residential
- Architectural style: Venetian Gothic
- Location: San Marco district, Venice, Italy
- Coordinates: 45°26′09.98″N 12°19′57.26″E
- Construction started: 15th century

Technical details
- Floor count: 3

Palazzo Corner Contarini dei Cavalli is a palace in Venice, located in the San Marco district, overlooking the left side of the Grand Canal, between the Rio di San Luca and Palazzo Grimani di San Luca on one side and Palazzo Tron and Palazzetto Tron Memmo on the other. The opposite structure is the Palazzo Papadopoli.

== History ==
The construction of the current building presumably dates back to the mid-15th century. In 1310, the previous building was branded with the so-called "stigma", reserved for traitors of the state because their owners took part in the failed conspiracy of Bajamonte Tiepolo against the Republic of Venice.

Among the illustrious men who stayed in the palazzo was mercenary commander Bartolomeo d'Alviano in the beginning of the 16th century.

The ownership of the building passed by a marriage to the prominent Contarini family in 1521, and they kept it until 1830 when it was sold to the Mocenigo family; after them it passed successively to the Ulbrichts, the Knights and the Ravenna. Currently, the building houses some offices of the Ministry of Justice.

== Architecture ==
The building is designed in the Venetian flowery gothic style but has different architectural motives on the various floors as it was subject to various renovations over the centuries. The ground floor has a 17th-century rustication with a central water door made in a form of serliana. The main floor maintains its original appearance with a hexafora with trefoil arches surmounted by quadrilobes and lateral single lancet windows that recall the style of the façade of Palazzo Ducale while the second floor, which is a 19th-century addition, develops with seven semicircular windows. All the facade openings have protruding balconies, except for the two side windows of the hexafora on the main floor.

The additional name "dei Cavalli" is because two large 15th-century shields depicting sea-horses decorate the facade.

== Gallery ==
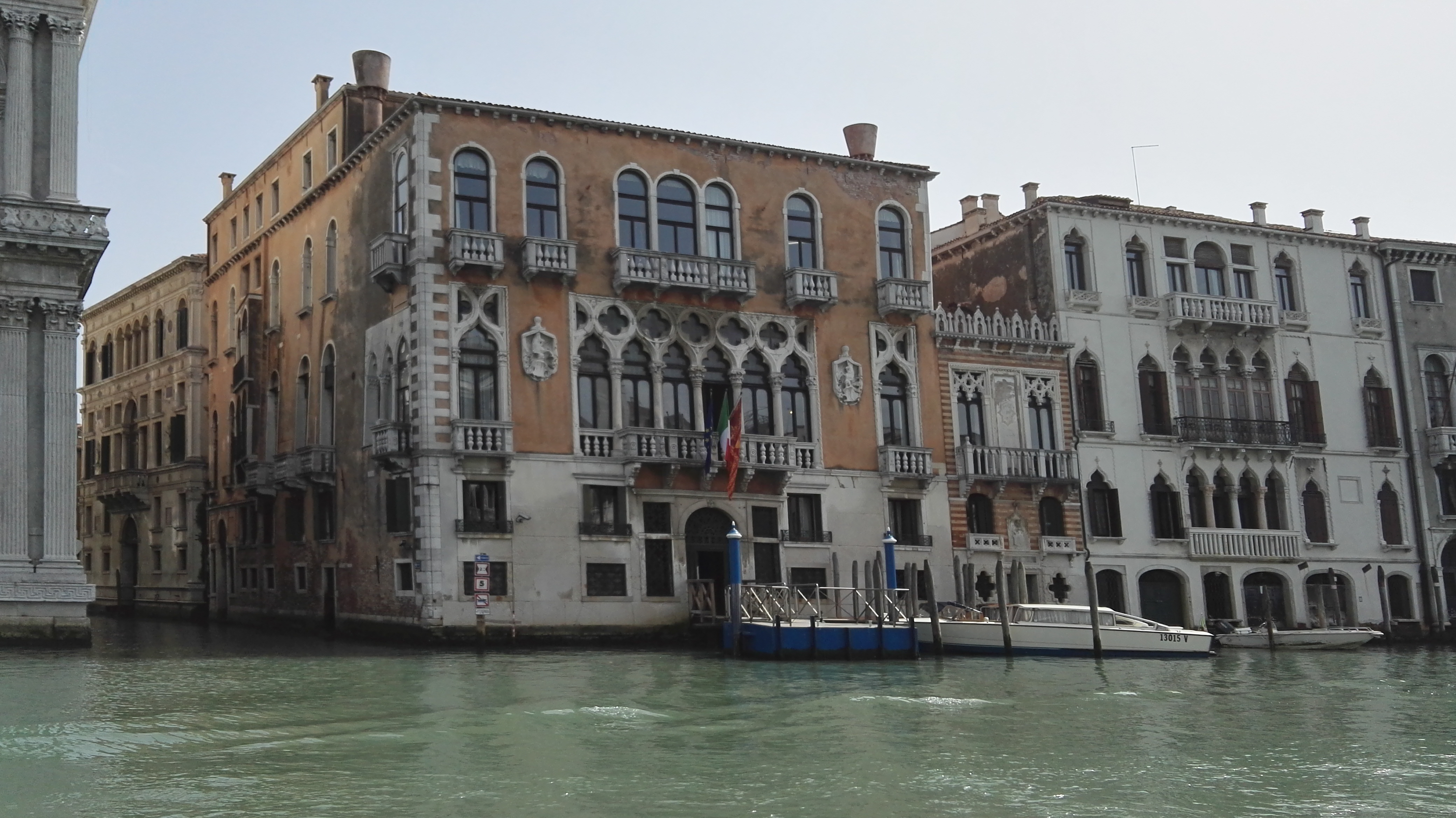
A side view from Grand Canal

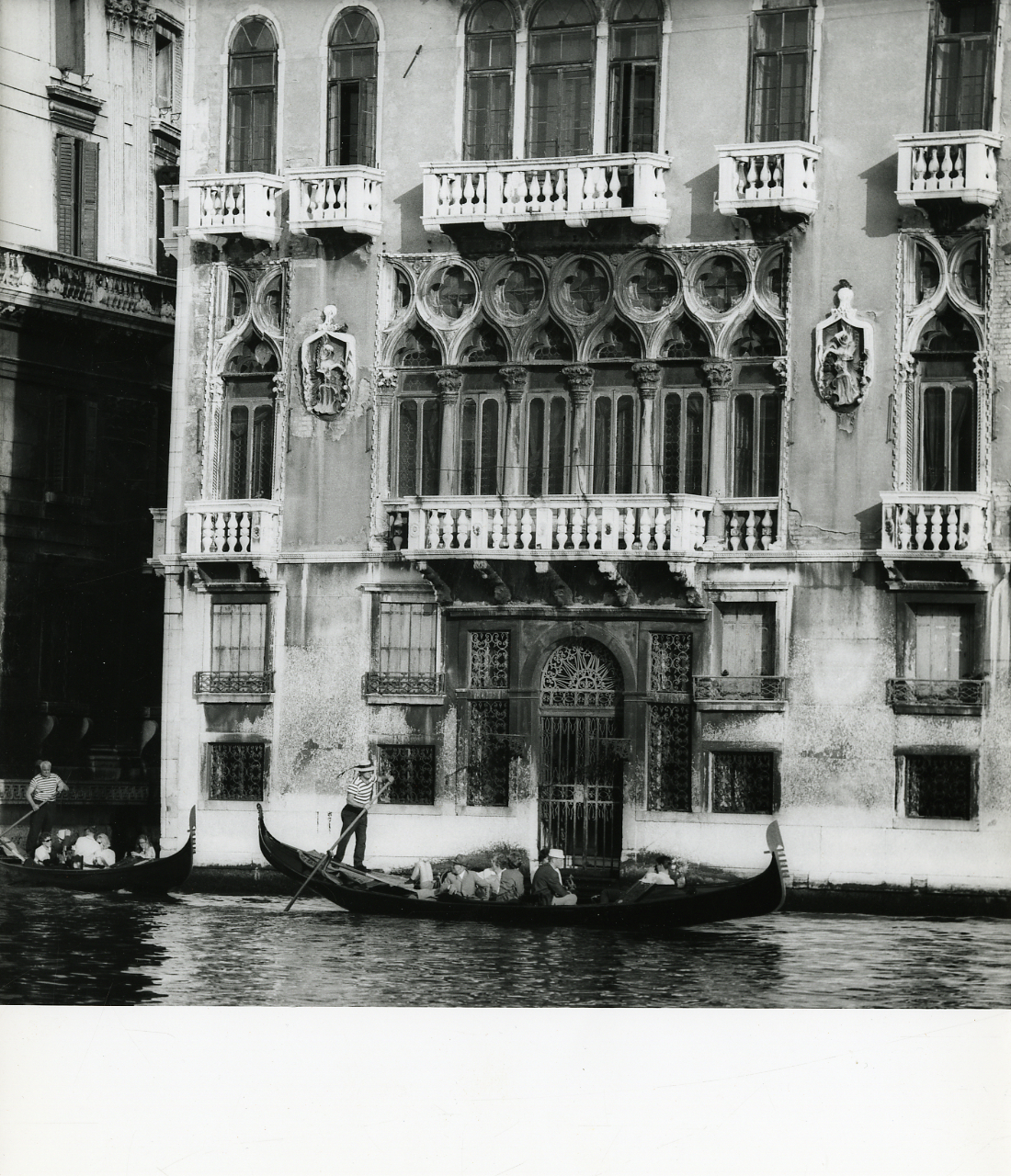
A 1969 photo by Paolo Monti

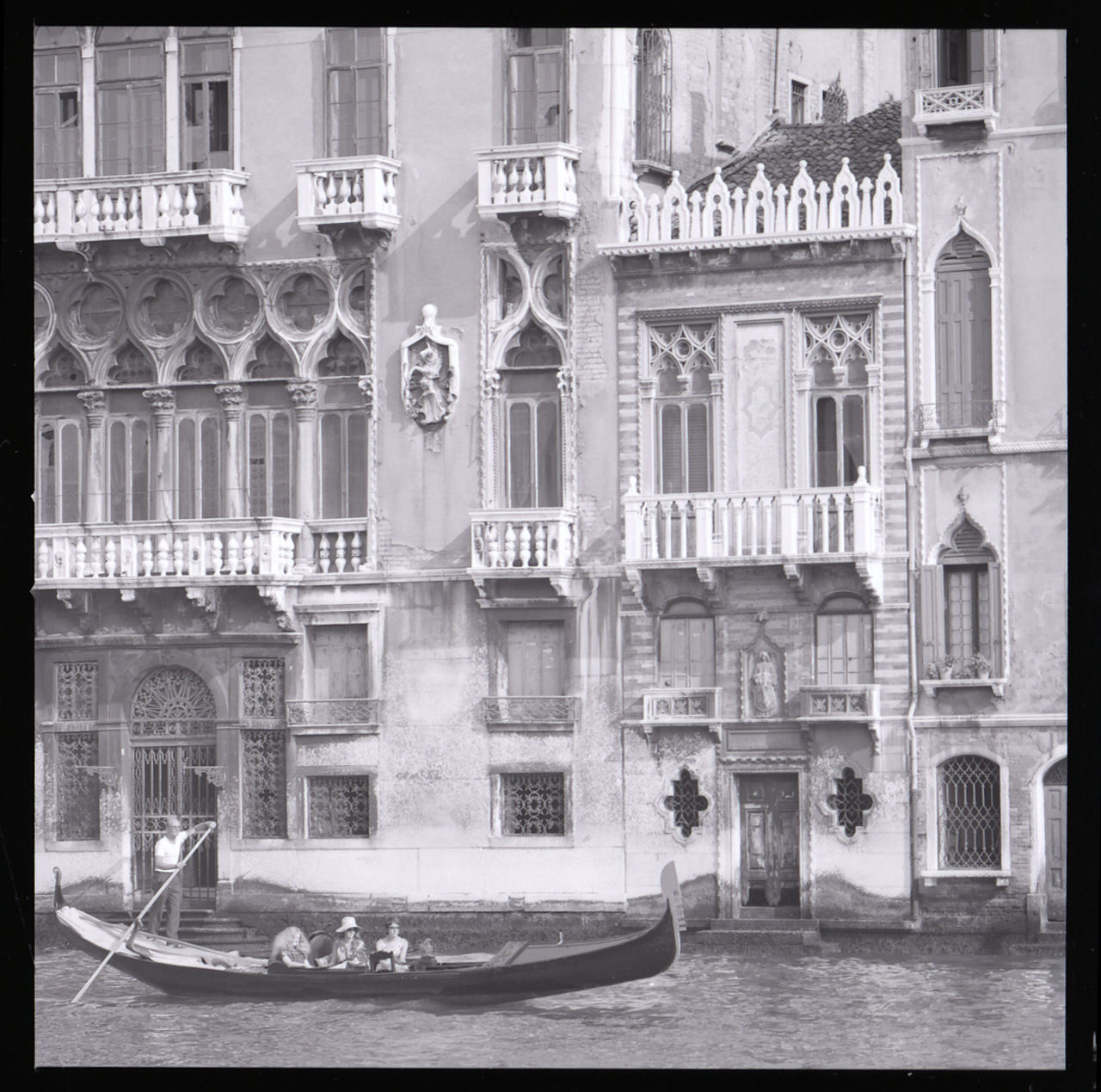
Facade detais, a 1969 foto by Paolo Monti
