= Marcantonio Trivisan =

Doge of Venice from 1553 to 1554

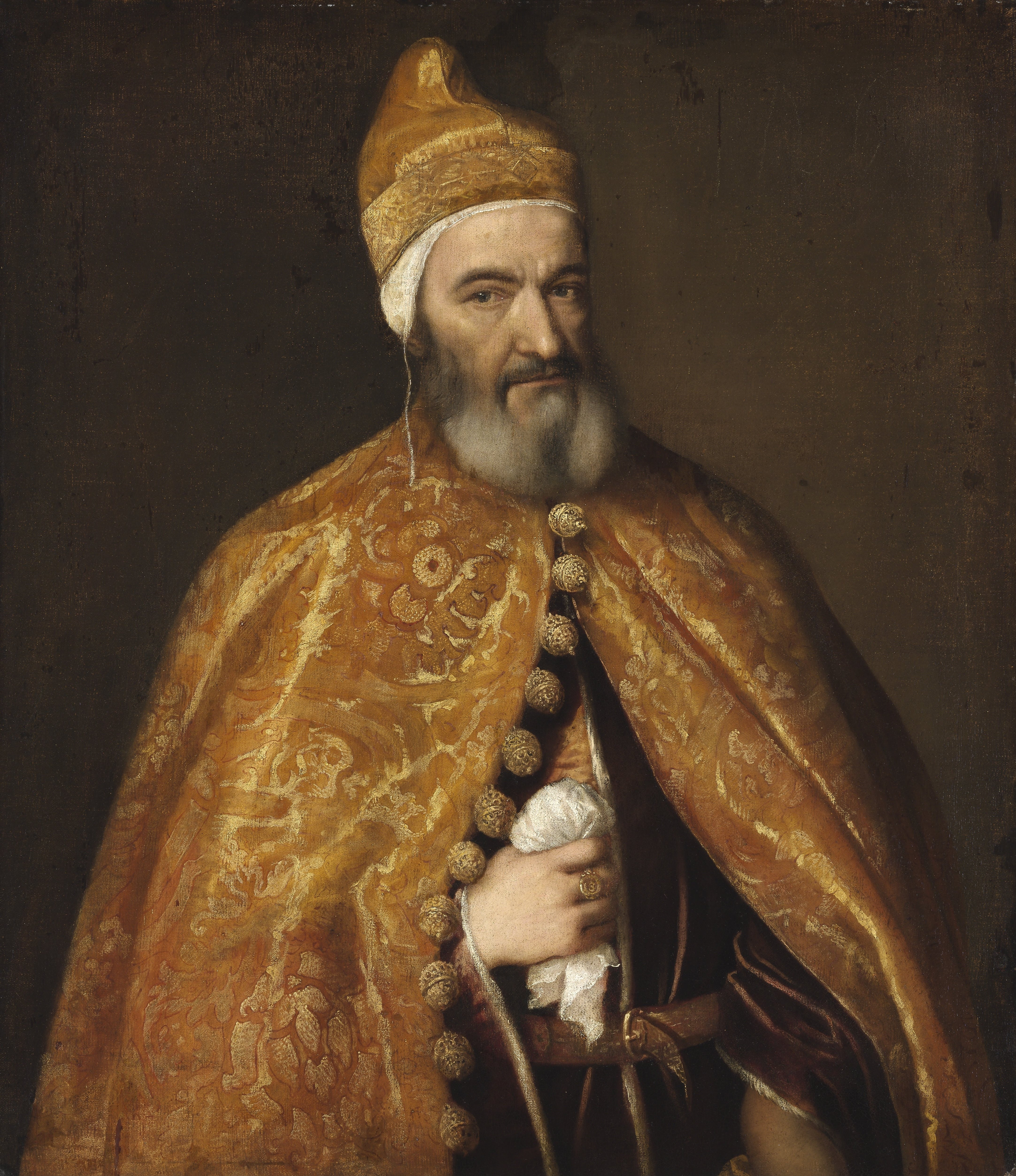
- Portrait by Titian (c. 1553)

Doge of Venice
- In office 1553–1554
- Preceded by: Francesco Donato
- Succeeded by: Francesco Venier

Personal details
- Born: c. 1475
- Died: 31 May 1554

Marcantonio Trevisan (c. 1475 - 31 May 1554), was the 80th Doge of Venice from 1553 to 1554.

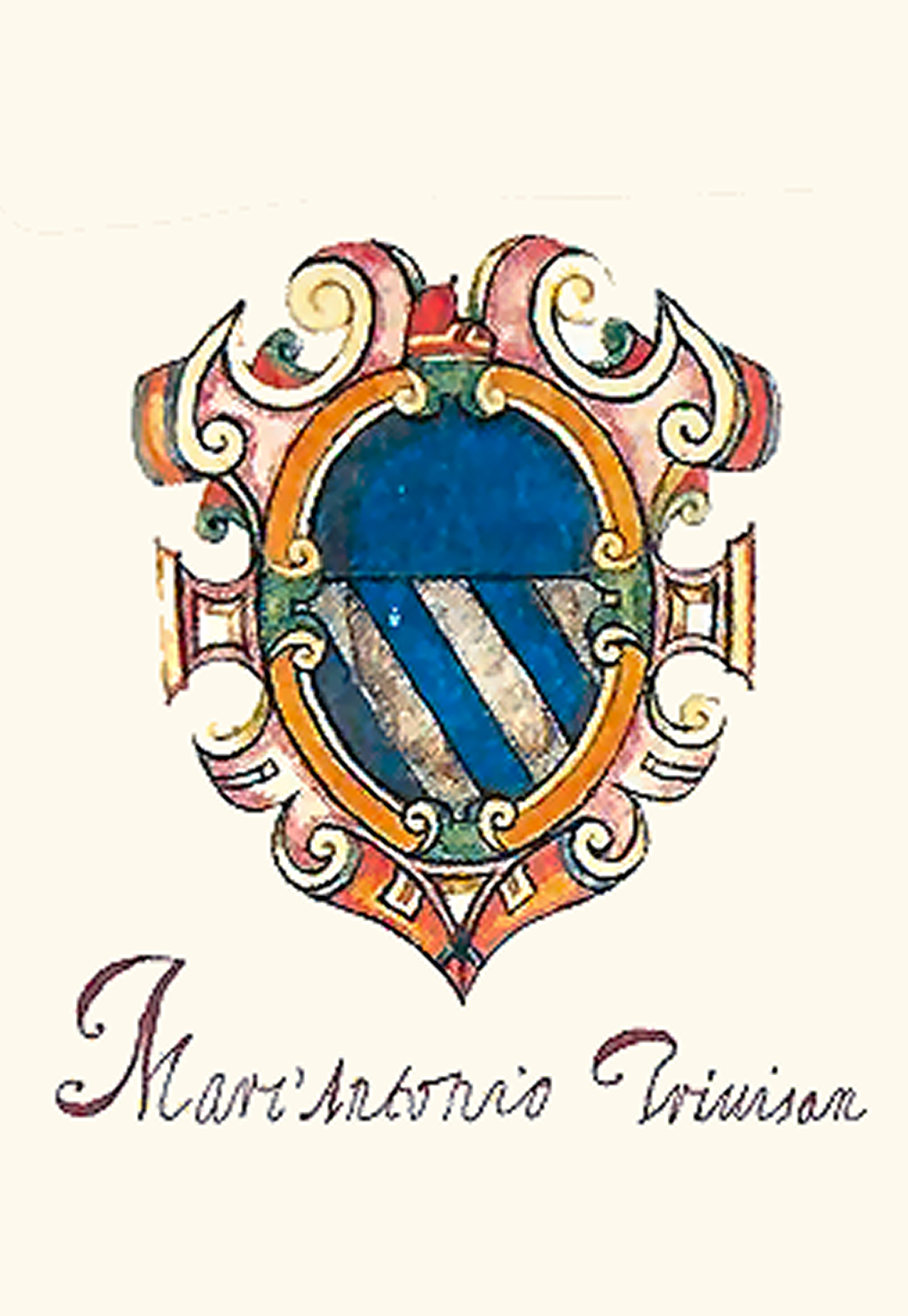
Coat of arms of Marcantonio Trivisan

Political offices
Preceded by Francesco Donato	Doge of Venice; 1553–1554	Succeeded by Francesco Venier
