= Pietro Lando =

Doge of Venice from 1539 to 1545

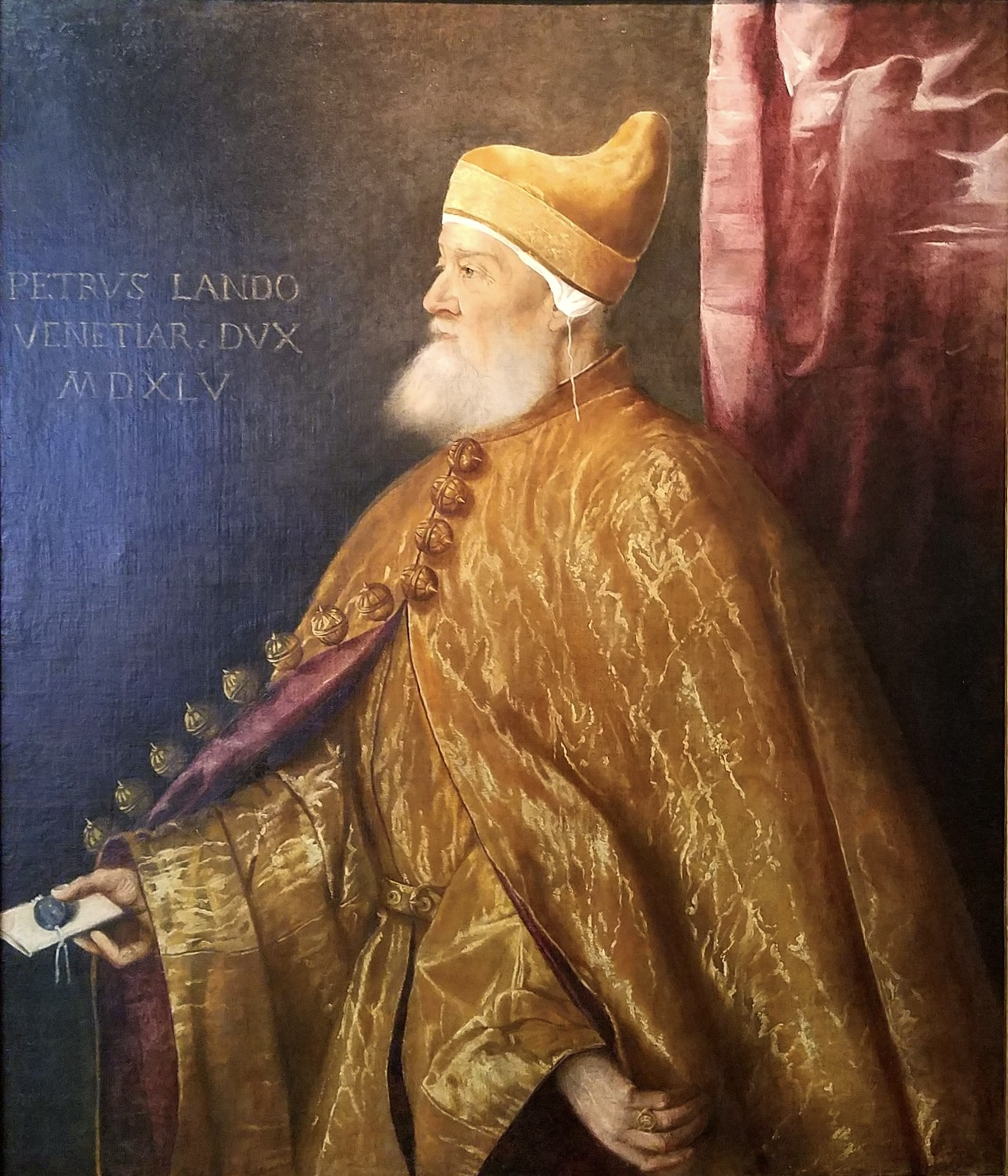
- Portrait of Pietro Lando by Jacopo Sansovino

Doge of Venice
- Reign: 1539–1545
- Predecessor: Andrea Gritti
- Successor: Francesco Donà
- Born: 1462; Venice, Republic of Venice
- Died: 9 November 1545 (aged 82–83); Venice
- Spouses: Maria Pasqualigo

Pietro Lando was the Doge of Venice from 1539 to 1545.

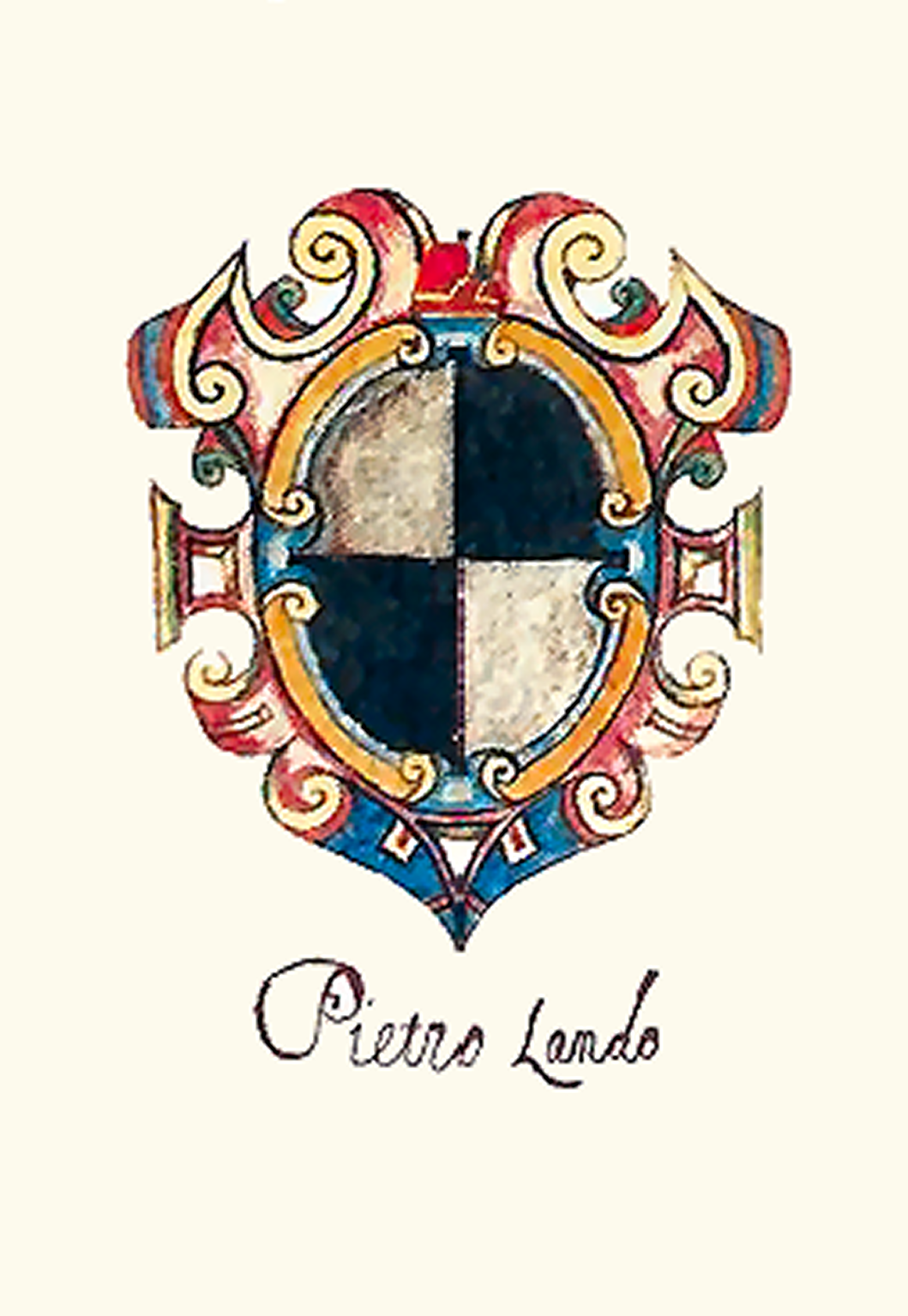
Coat of arms of Pietro Lando

He had a distinguished career as Captain General of the Sea, but was forced to sign a humiliating peace treaty with Suleiman I in 1540, ceding Venice's last possessions in the Peloponnese to the Ottoman Empire. He was married to Maria Pasqualigo.

== Biography ==
=== Youth ===
Pietro Lando, son of Giovanni and Stella Foscari, devoted himself in his youth first to the study of Plato but then, like almost all the young Venetian nobles of his time, to trade in the East, without however getting rich. Back in Venice he devoted himself to forensic art and then traveled a lot, excelling in the art of government and administration since he was repeatedly called to hold city rectories and became several times ambassador of his homeland. He married Maria Pasqualigo, he had two children. Pietro Lando was a descendant of Skurra Bua Shpata.

=== Prison ===
Having obtained numerous administrative assignments, Pietro Lando was sent in 1509, the year of the League of Cambrai that saw the unification of the forces of France, Spain, the Papacy, Austria and other minor kingdoms against the overpowering power of Venice, near Romagna (Faenza) where, despite his expertise, he was captured in the same year. After three hard years of imprisonment he was freed following peace agreements and was able to return to Venice. Perhaps affected in the soul by the detention, he withdrew for some time from his public career even if in 1534 he managed to become Prosecutor of Saint Mark, a sign that, after all, his ascent to positions of greater responsibility had not stopped. He was a collaborator of the doge Andrea Gritti and, at his death (December 28, 1538), became one of the favorites for his succession.

=== Doge ===
His election took place on Sunday, January 19, 1539. The great celebrations for his election were disturbed by the news of a quadruple murder at the hands of a certain Pietro Ramberti who, for money, killed his maternal aunt, his servant and the little children of the first. In 1542, when Venice wanted to reach an accommodation against its Turkish enemies, it was discovered that some secretaries of the most important public bodies had sold news to the enemy causing the loss of precious strongholds. Moreover, the peace obtained was only a brief truce. It should be borne in mind that, precisely following this fact, it was decided to establish and then strengthen the office of the "State Inquisitors", known above all in the 18th century for the selective and almost manic control of Venetian society. The secret agents affiliated with this institution were called "babau". During 1539 and 1543, a famine raged in Venice that killed many inhabitants and unleashed popular anger against the government.

=== Last years and death ===
1544 instead opened with a dispute between the Roman Inquisition, which wished to extend its influence on the territory of the Republic, and Venice which refused external interference. The Lando, old and sick, and according to everyone, without a great personality, in recent times limited himself to vivacizing, refusing to take part in councils and government meetings. It was thought to make him abdicate for incapacity but, finally, nature took its course. On November 9, 1545, he died and was buried in the church of Sant'Antonio di Castello; his ashes were lost.

Political offices
Preceded by Andrea Gritti	Doge of Venice; 1539–1545	Succeeded by Francesco Donato
