= Battle of Oranik (1448) =

Part of the Albanian-Venetian War of 1447–1448

First Battle of Oranik Beteja e Parë e Oranikut
- Part of the Albanian–Venetian War (1447–1448)
Date	August 14, 1448
Location	Oranik (Debar in modern day Macedonia) 41°31′N 20°32′E
Result	Albanian victory

Belligerents
League of Lezhë	Ottoman Empire

Commanders and leaders
Skanderbeg	(Ottoman Empire) Mustafa Pasha (POW)

Strength
6,000	15,000

Casualties and losses
Unknown	3,000 casualties 15 standards 12 major officers
- Location within modern North Macedonia

The First Battle of Oranik (Albanian: Beteja e Parë e Oranikut) took place during the Albanian-Venetian War of (1447–1448), when the Republic of Venice allied with the Ottoman Empire against the League of Lezhë. The Albanian forces under Skanderbeg defeated the Ottoman army led by Mustafa Pasha during a battle that took place near Oranik of Upper Dibra, and two months later, peace was established between Albania and Venice.

== Background ==
In 1447, war broke out between Skanderbeg's League of Lezhë and the Venetians over the town of Dagnum in northern Albania. Skanderbeg defeated the Venetians at the Battle of the River Drin, and this was followed by a pause in conflict over the harsh winter season. After failed negotiations over the winter regarding Dagnum, Skanderbeg resumed hostilities against the Venetians and besieged Dagnum and Drisht. However, upon the request of Vrana Konti, Skanderbeg turned his attention towards an Ottoman force under Mustafa Pasha that had crossed into Albania near Oranik of Upper Dibra. This Ottoman incursion was encouraged and instigated by the Venetians, as both the Venetians and Ottomans had agreed to launch simultaneous offensives against Skanderbeg. Skanderbeg left 5,000 men under the command of Marin Spani and his nephew Hamza Kastrioti to continue the aforementioned sieges and to garrison Balec whilst Skanderbeg himself took the main part of the army to do battle with the Ottomans.

== Battle ==
With an army of 15,000 Ottoman soldiers, Mustafa Pasha penetrated Upper Dibra, and believing that Skanderbeg was still occupied at Dagnum, he marched quickly towards inner Albania. On the 14th of August, 1448, Skanderbeg and his army of 6,000 men surprised the Ottomans by deploying near Oranik. The Albanians proceeded to deliver a severe defeat upon the Ottoman Turks.

== Aftermath ==
The Ottomans lost 3,000 men, and a large number of Turks were taken prisoner, including Mustafa Pasha and twelve high officers. Skanderbeg pursued the fleeing Ottoman forces in order to avenge the massacres and pillages committed by Mustafa Pasha in Albania. Skanderbeg then once again headed northwards to resume his siege on Dagnum, where his absence had proved detrimental. Skanderbeg's nephew Hamza had acted recklessly by initiating a failed assault on Drisht, and in reaction to this failure, he burnt much of Drisht's surroundings. Additionally, whilst Skanderbeg was fighting the Ottomans in Oranik, the Venetians attacked Balec, which was at this time defended by Marin Spani. Because the fortress was half-rebuilt and would have therefore been impossible to defend against a heavily numerically-superior army, Spani withdrew his troops south of the Drin river, resulting in the Venetians razing the abandoned castle.

Skanderbeg learned about the loss of Balec from the captured Ottoman officers and that it was the Venetians who pushed the Ottomans to invade Albania in order to break the siege of Dagnum. The Venetians, upon hearing of the defeat of the Ottomans at Oranik, urgently wished to establish peace. Mustafa Pasha was soon ransomed for 25,000 ducats to the Ottomans.

After months of inconclusive campaigning against the Venetians around Dagnum and Shkodër, Skanderbeg realized that he would need to reach an agreement with Venice if he wished to carry on his resistance against the Ottomans. On the 4th of October, a peace treaty was concluded between the two parties in which Dagnum and Drisht were abandoned to the Republic of Venice in exchange for a strip of territory along the Drin river and an annual payment of 1,400 ducats. Skanderbeg was also given a loan of 1,500 ducats to help John Hunyadi against the Ottoman Turks in Kosovo, as well as an annual tribute of two hundred horses loaded with salt among other commodities.

== External sources ==
- Francione, Gennaro (2006) [2003]. Aliaj, Donika (ed.). Skënderbeu, një hero modern : (Hero multimedial) [Skanderbeg, a modern hero (Hero multimedia)] (in Albanian). Translated by Tasim Aliaj. Tiranë, Albania: Shtëpia botuese "Naim Frashëri". ISBN 99927-38-75-8.
