= House of Venier =

Coat of arms of Venier family. Blazon: Barry of six Gules and Argent

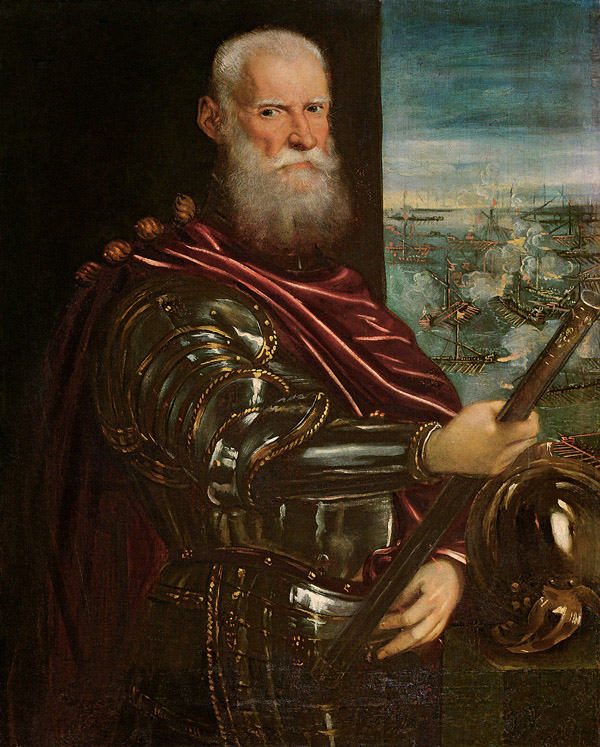
Sebastiano Venier in a portrait by Tintoretto

The House of Venier was a prominent family in the Republic of Venice that entered the Venetian patriciate in the 14th century.

== History ==
First appearing in historical records during the 11th century, the Venier family is of unclear origin; an ancestry from Vicenza, claimed by genealogists, is disputed. Various members of the family are recorded in the earliest documents as residing in Chioggia, suggesting that the clan's main seat was originally there, before it relocated to Rialto. Following the Fourth Crusade, one branch of the family held lordship over the Greek islands of Cerigo (Kythira) and Paros; the family also exercised feudal jurisdiction over the Dalmatian castle of Zemonico (Zemunik) and the castle of Sanguinetto (near Verona), jointly with the Martinengo and Leoni families. A branch of the family also settled in Candia (Crete) and played a significant role in the island's uprisings against Venetian rule.

The Venier family actively participated in the political life of the Republic, producing three doges: Antonio (r. 1382–1400), Francesco (r. 1554–1556) and Sebastiano (r. 1577–1578), and was renowned for its distinguished jurists, ambassadors, and men of letters. Notable among the latter were Domenico (born 1517), a prolific rhymer acclaimed in his day; his brother Lorenzo, author of obscene poems that nonetheless effectively depicted the customs of the era; and Maffio, Lorenzo's son, a playwright and talented vernacular verse-writer whose works include La Strazzosa, one of the finest examples of 16th-century poetry in Venetian.

== Notable members ==
- Pietro Venier (died 8 May 1372) who was the Governor of Cerigo
- Antonio Venier (circa 1330 - 23 November 1400) who was Doge of Venice from October 1382 until his death.
- Andrea Venier (fl. 15th century) a provveditore of Venetian Albania
- Lorenzo Venier, a Dominican friar, was appointed Archbishop of Zadar, Croatia, on 19 Jan 1428 and was succeeded in 1449. He had previously been in the bishopric of Modon.
- Alvise Venier was elected to the lifetime position of Procuratore di San Marco de Citra Canale on 12 Jan. 1444 and replaced 15 Jan. 1452
- Michiel Venier was elected to the lifetime position of Procuratore di San Marco de Supra Canale on 2 Jan. 1450 and replaced 2 April 1463
- Deodato Venier was a canon at the cathedral of Zadar, now Croatia, and became Abbot of San Crisogono (a Benedictine abbey belonging to the reformed congregation of Santa Giustina), in Zadar, 1459-1488 (according to M. Pelc). He was convicted of a number of crimes but soon absolved of them. He commissioned four liturgical books for the abbey, decorated probably in Venice, that still survive.
- Francesco Venier, appointed podestà (city ruler, or minister of justice) of Padua for a term of one year by Doge Christoforo Moro, Venice, 1 Oct. 1470 Francesco Venier, presumably the same person, was elected to the lifetime position of Procuratore di San Marco de Ultra Canale on 27 Dec. 1475 and was replaced 20 Jan. 1486
- Antonio Venier was elected to the lifetime position of Procuratore di San Marco de Supra Canale on 13 Jan 1472 and was replaced on 13 Nov. 1474
- Benedetto Venier was elected Procuratore di San Marco de Citra Canale on 31 Dec. 1475 and was replaced March 14, 1487.
- Bernardo Venier "fu de ser Giacomo" was podestà of Padua in 1476
- Antonio Venier fu de ser Dolfin was podestà of Padua in 1485 Antonio Venier, presumably the same person, was elected to the lifetime position of Procuratore di San Marco de Supra Canale 1 March 1489 and replaced 27 March 1492
- Marin Venier fu de ser Alvise Procurator was podestà of Padua in 1492 Marin Venier, presumably the same person, was elected to the lifetime position of Procuratore di San Marco de Supra Canale on 23 Dec. 1501 and resigned 20 Jan. 1502
- Andrea Venier was elected Procuratore di San Marco de Supra Canale on 28 July 1509 and was replaced on June 17, 1513
- Marcantonio Venier was elected to the lifetime position of Procuratore di San Marco de Citra Canale on March 17, 1554 and replaced April 6, 1556
- Francesco Venier was Doge of Venice from 1554 to 1556.
- Bernardò Venier was elected to the lifetime position of Procuratore di San Marco de Citra Canale on Aug. 9, 1557, and replaced on 23 Oct. 1559
- Nurbanu Sultan (Cecilia Venier-Baffo) was the Haseki sultan of the Ottoman Empire from 1566 to 1574 and wife of Selim II and the Mother of Murad III and Valide sultan of the Ottoman Empire from 1574 to until her death in 1583. She was also the daughter of Nicolò Venier, Lord of Paros and the paternal great great great granddaughter of Antonio Venier, Doge of Venice. She was the Valide Sultan of the Ottoman Empire when her father's first cousin Sebastiano Venier was the Doge of Venice. Through her son Murad III who himself was half Venier by blood, she is the ancestor of most of the Ottoman Sultans until the Empire's dissolution in 1922.
- Sebastiano Venier (c. 1496 – March 3, 1578) was Doge of Venice from June 11, 1577 to March 3, 1578. He had been an admiral of the Venetian fleet and was one of the protagonists in the 1571 Battle of Lepanto
- Nicolò Venier was elected to the lifetime position of Procuratore di San Marco de Citra Canale on 24 Feb. 1579 and replaced 20 Oct. 1587

The Peggy Guggenheim Collection in Venice is housed in the Palazzo Venier dei Leoni, and the Croatian town of Vinjerac (once Castel Venier) takes its name from the family.

== Sources ==
- Lane, Frederic Chapin (1973). Venice, a Maritime Republic. Johns Hopkins University Press. ISBN 978-0-8018-1460-0.
- Setton, Kenneth Meyer (1978). The Papacy and the Levant, 1204-1571. DIANE Publishing. p. 20. ISBN 978-0-87169-127-9. "Venier."
