= Andrea Venier =

Andrea Venier (fl. 15th century) was a 15th-century notable member of the Venier family.

In 1422 he was Venetian chamberlain in Scutari (modern Shkodër) and after some time he was appointed as chief magistrate of Antivari (modern Bar, Montenegro). In 1441 Venier became castellan of Scutari and by July 1448, during the Albanian-Venetian War (1447-1448), he was the provveditore of the entire Venetian Albania. He played an important role in relations between Skanderbeg and the Venetian Republic.

In August 1457 Venetians recaptured Dagnum from the Dukagjini after fierce battle and significant casualties. Venetian forces led by Venier were supported by Skanderbeg. In 1458, together with Francesco Venier and Malchiore Da Imola, Andrea prepared plans for the reinforcement of the castle in Scutari. The Venetian Senate consulted Venier regarding its politics in Albania.

== Sources ==
- Božić, Ivan (1979), Nemirno pomorje XV veka (in Serbian), Beograd: Srpska književna zadruga, OCLC 5845972
