= Francesco Donato =

Doge of Venice from 1545 to 1553

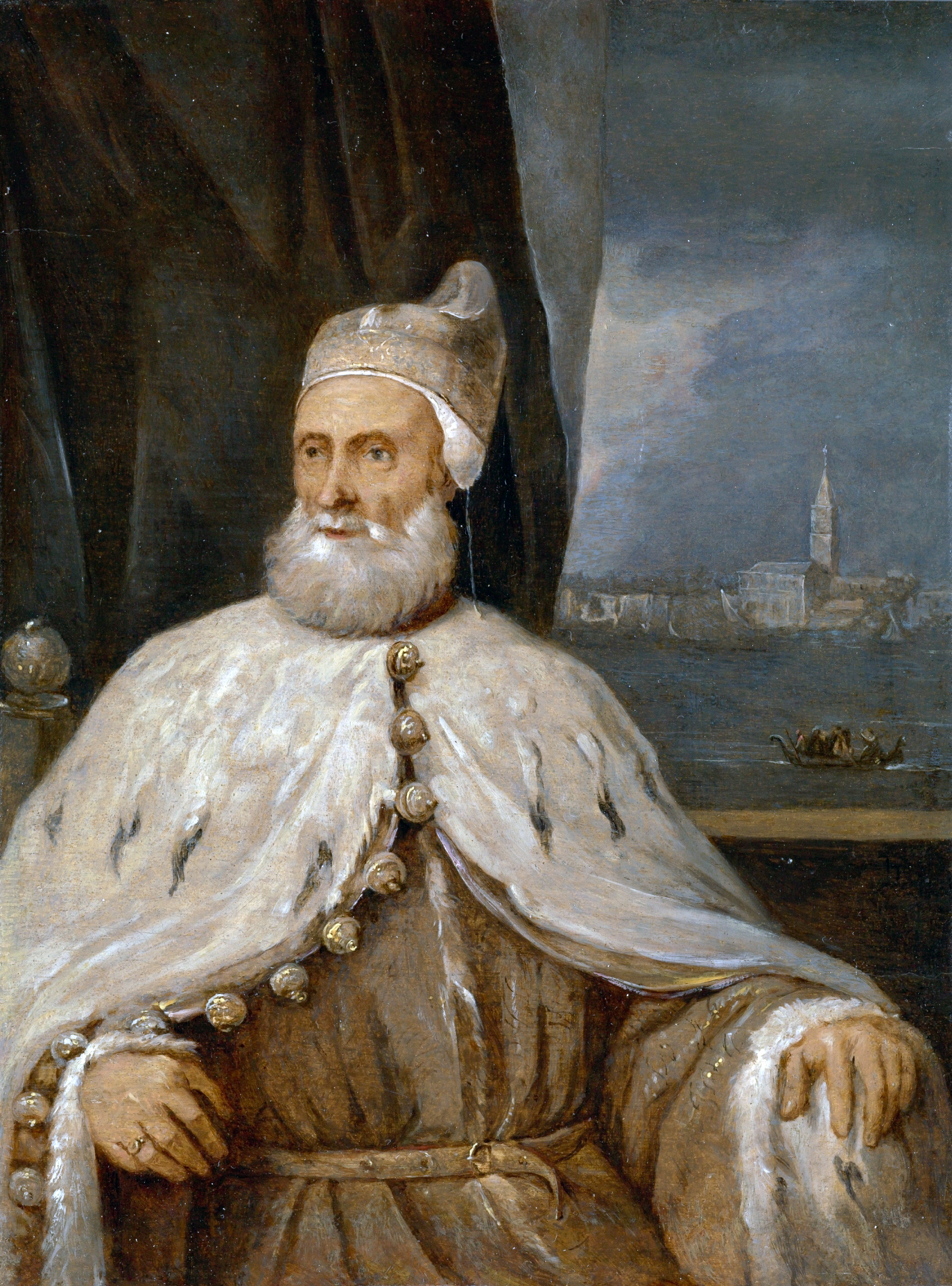
- Portrait of Francesco Donato by David Teniers the Younger

Doge of Venice
- In office 1545–1553
- Preceded by: Pietro Lando
- Succeeded by: Marcantonio Trivisan

Personal details
- Born: c. 1468
- Died: 23 May 1553

Francesco Donato (c. 1468 – 23 May 1553) was a member of the Donato family of Venice. He was the 79th Doge of Venice from 1545 to 1553. He was married to Giovanna Da Mula and Alicia Giustiniani.

Donato served as ambassador to Spain in 1504, to England in 1509, and to Florence in 1512. He maintained Venice's neutrality in the war between Charles V and Francis I of France, and contributed to the peace treaty with Suleiman. Elected Doge at the age of 77, he remained in office until his death in 1553.

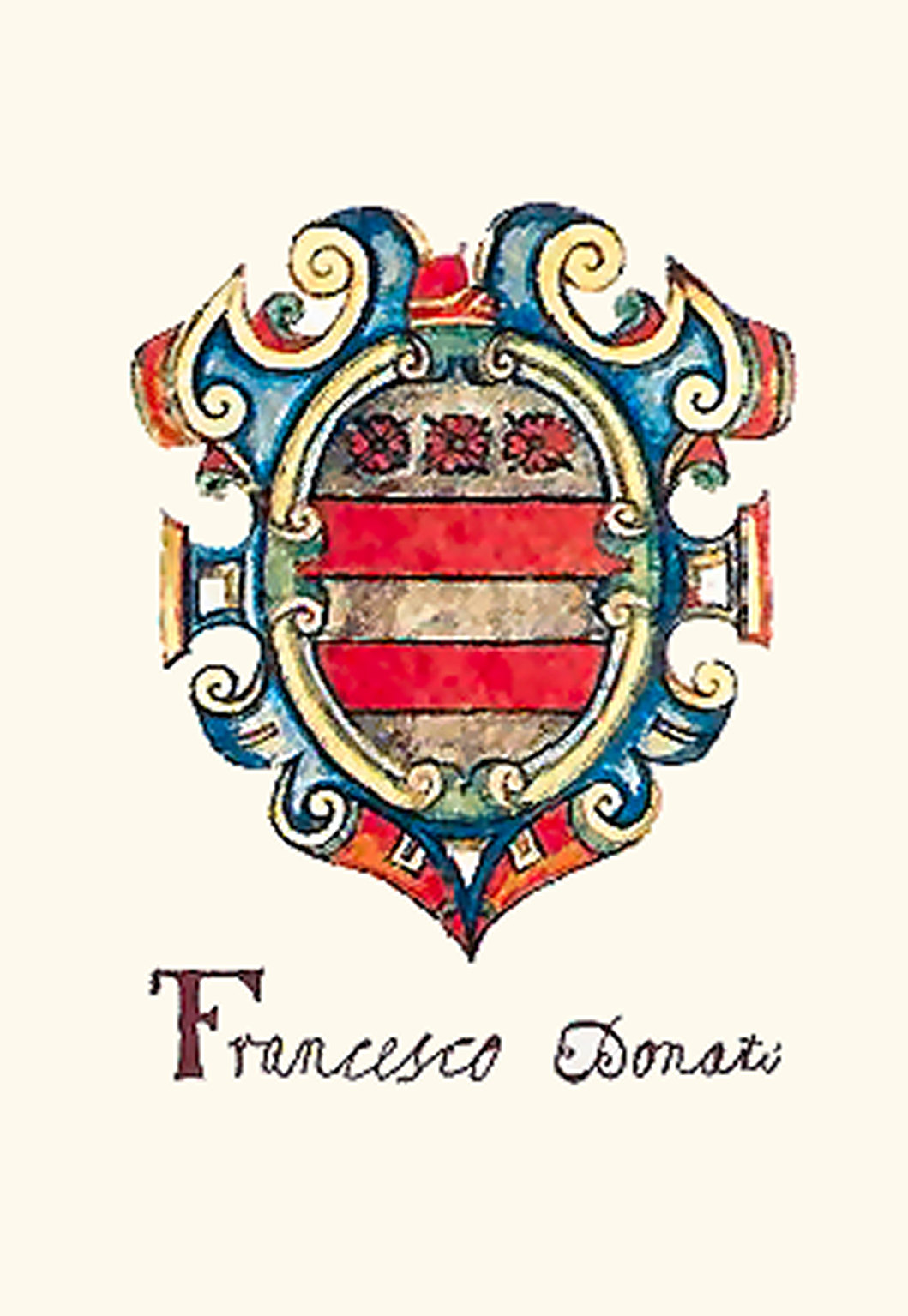
Coat of arms of Francesco Donato

Political offices
Preceded by Pietro Lando	Doge of Venice; 1545–1553	Succeeded by Marcantonio Trivisan
