= Venerius =

Venerius is the name of two Christian saints:

- Venerius of Milan (d. 408), bishop of Milan
- Venerius the Hermit (ca. 560 - 630), monk and hermit, patron saint of lighthouse keepers and of the Italian town of La Spezia
