= Francesco Venier =

Doge of Venice from 1554 to 1556

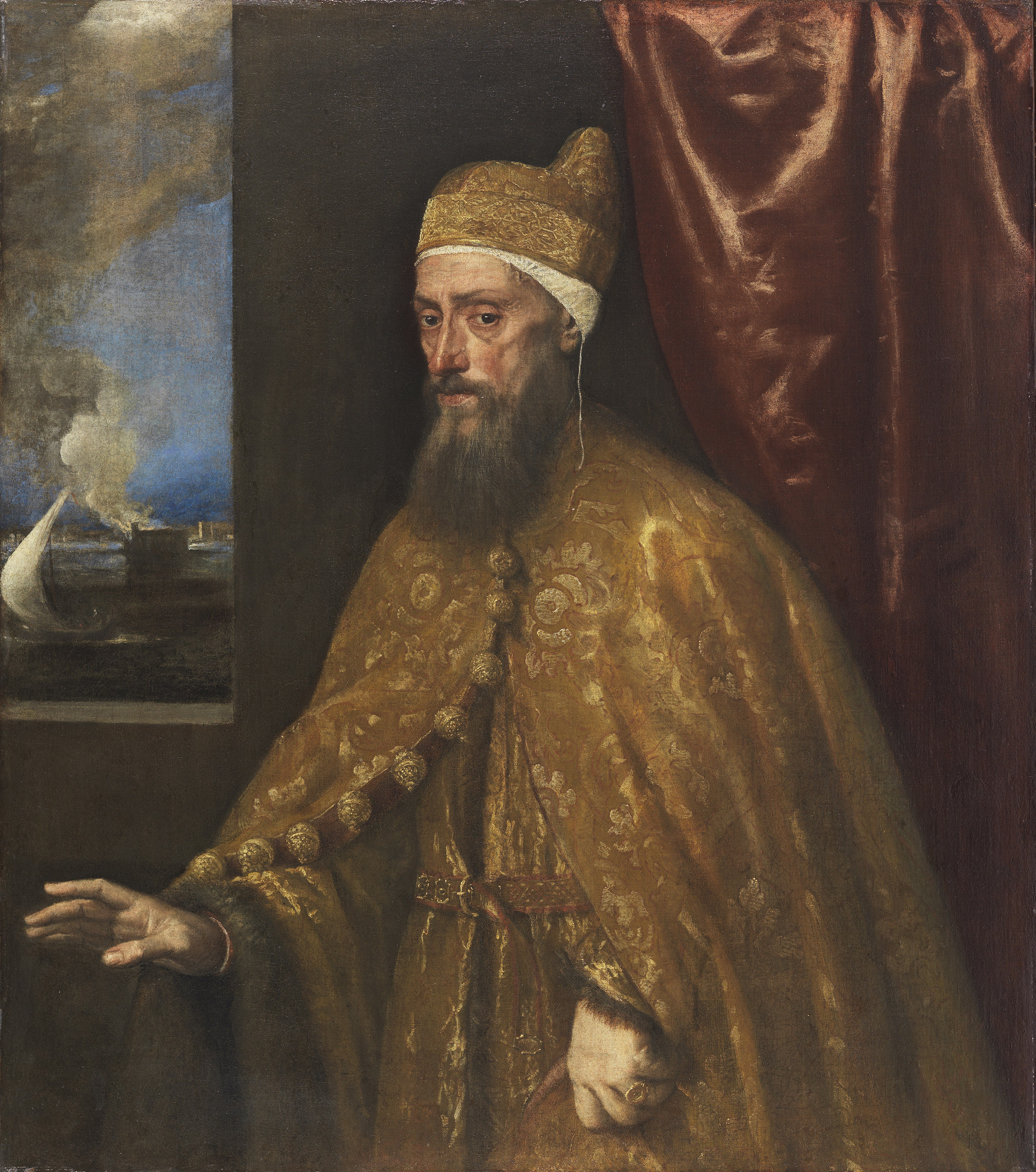
- Portrait by Titian

Doge of Venice
- In office 1554–1556
- Preceded by: Marcantonio Trivisan
- Succeeded by: Lorenzo Priuli

Personal details
- Born: 1489
- Died: 2 June 1556 (aged 66–67)

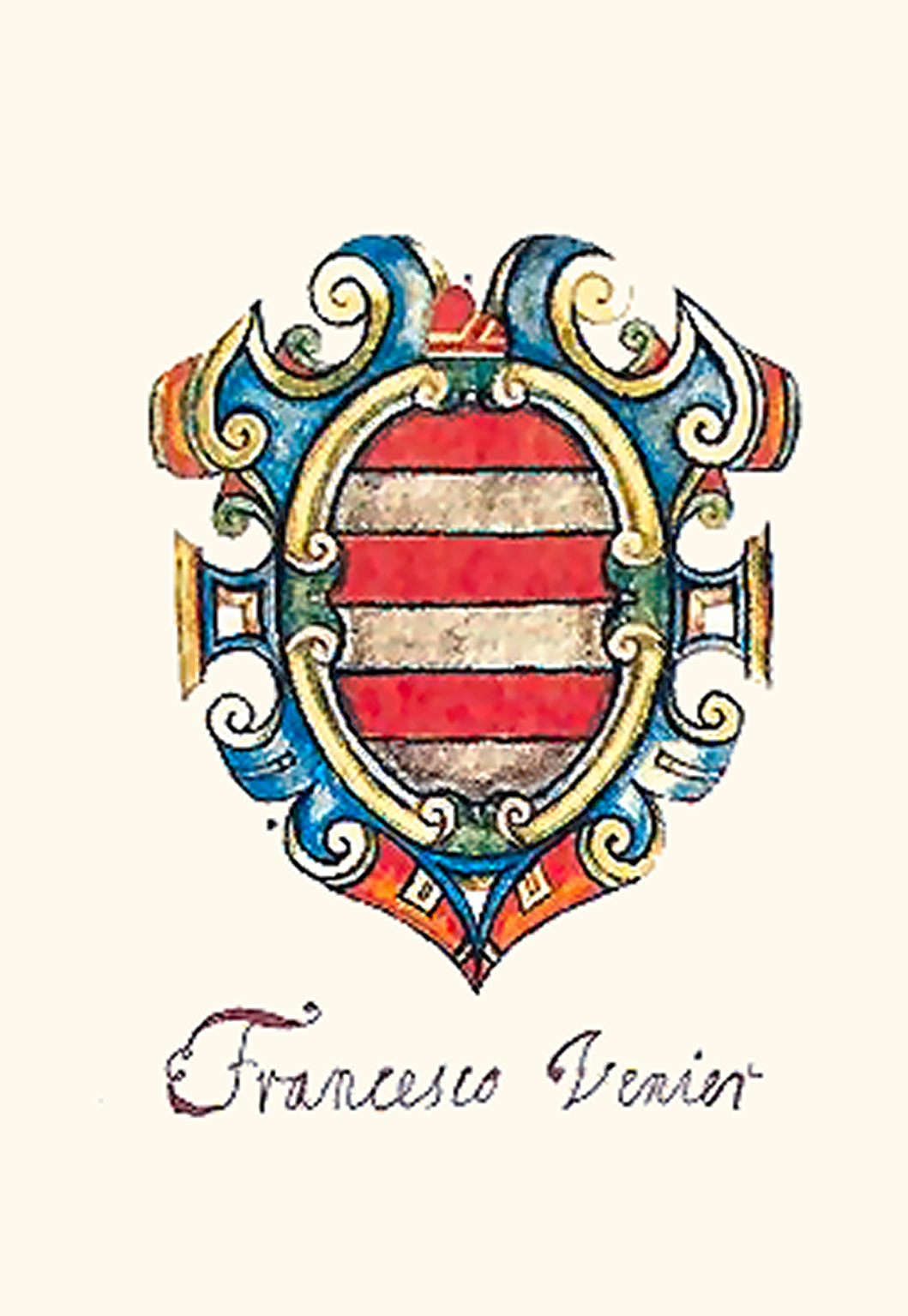
Coat of arms of Francesco Venier

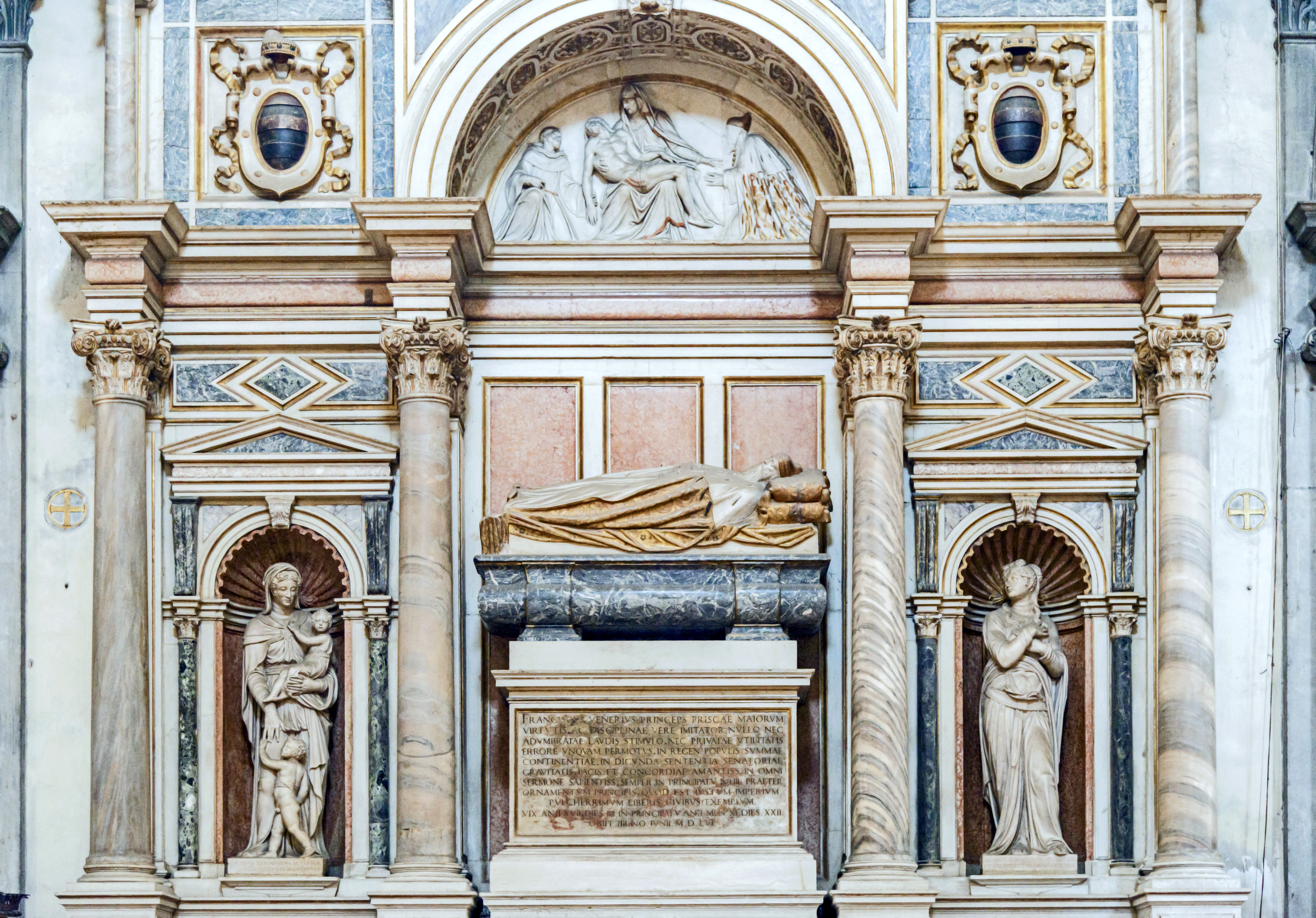
Francesco Venier's monument in San Salvador (Venice)

Francesco Venier (1489 – 2 June 1556) was the Doge of Venice from 1554 to his death in 1556.

Venier was the son of Giovanni Venier and Maria Loredan. His maternal grandfather was Doge Leonardo Loredan.

== See also ==
- House of Venier

Political offices
Preceded by Marcantonio Trivisan	Doge of Venice; 1554–1556	Succeeded by Lorenzo Priuli
