= House of Donà =

Venetian noble family

Donà
- Italian noble family
- Arms of the Donà dalle Rose; Blazon: Argent, two bars Gules, in chief three roses barbed and seeded of the Second
- Country: Republic of Venice
- Earlier spellings: Donato; Donatus; Donati
- Etymology: from the diminutive of the masculine given name Donatus
- Origin: Romagna, Emilia-Romagna; Altinum, Veneto
- Founded: 12th century
- Titles: Doge of Venice; Procurator of Saint Mark; Patrician of Venice (hereditary); Archbishop of Crete; various other bishoprics; Ambassador of the Republic of Venice in Constantinople; various other ambassadorships; Podestà of Venice; Governor (respectively) of Ravenna, Brescia, Cremona, and Crete
- Style: Serene Highness
- Traditions: Roman Catholicism
- Motto: Candore ("Candour")
- Cadet branches: dalle Rose; dalle Trezze (extinct); many other minor now-extinct branches

The House of Donà is an old patrician family of Venice which produced three doges of Venice. The family has existed since at least the late twelfth century. Until the sixteenth century, the family were merchants. During that period, they bought land, which supported the family through the seventeenth and eighteenth centuries. Around and throughout the nineteenth century, the family's wealth was significantly diminished due to the influences of the French Revolution and industrialisation.

The dalle Rose branch (the main branch) of the family, which produced two of the Donà doges of Venice, survives to this day. In the second half of the twentieth century, the Donà dalle Rose included a number of businesspeople, most notably the founders of the Costa Smeralda’s Porto Rotondo, brothers Luigi and Nicolò Donà dalle Rose.

== Members ==
Notable members of the dalle Rose branch of the family have included:

- Pietro Donà: archbishop, humanist, and patron of art (c. 1390–1447)
- Girolamo Donà: diplomat, historian, and humanist (c. 1456–1511)
- Francesco Donà: 79th Doge of Venice (1545–1553)
- Leonardo Donà: 90th Doge of Venice; also Venetian Ambassador both in the Vatican and in Constantinople, as well as a supporter of Galileo Galilei (1606–1612)
- Pierdonato Donà dalle Rose: World War II aviator decorated with the Gold Medal of Military Valor (1914–1941)

Notable members of the dalle Trezze branch of the family have included:

- Nicolò Donà: 93rd Doge of Venice (1539–1618)

Arms of the dalle Trezze branch of the House of Donà: Per party fess Argent and barry of four Azure and Or

== Seats ==
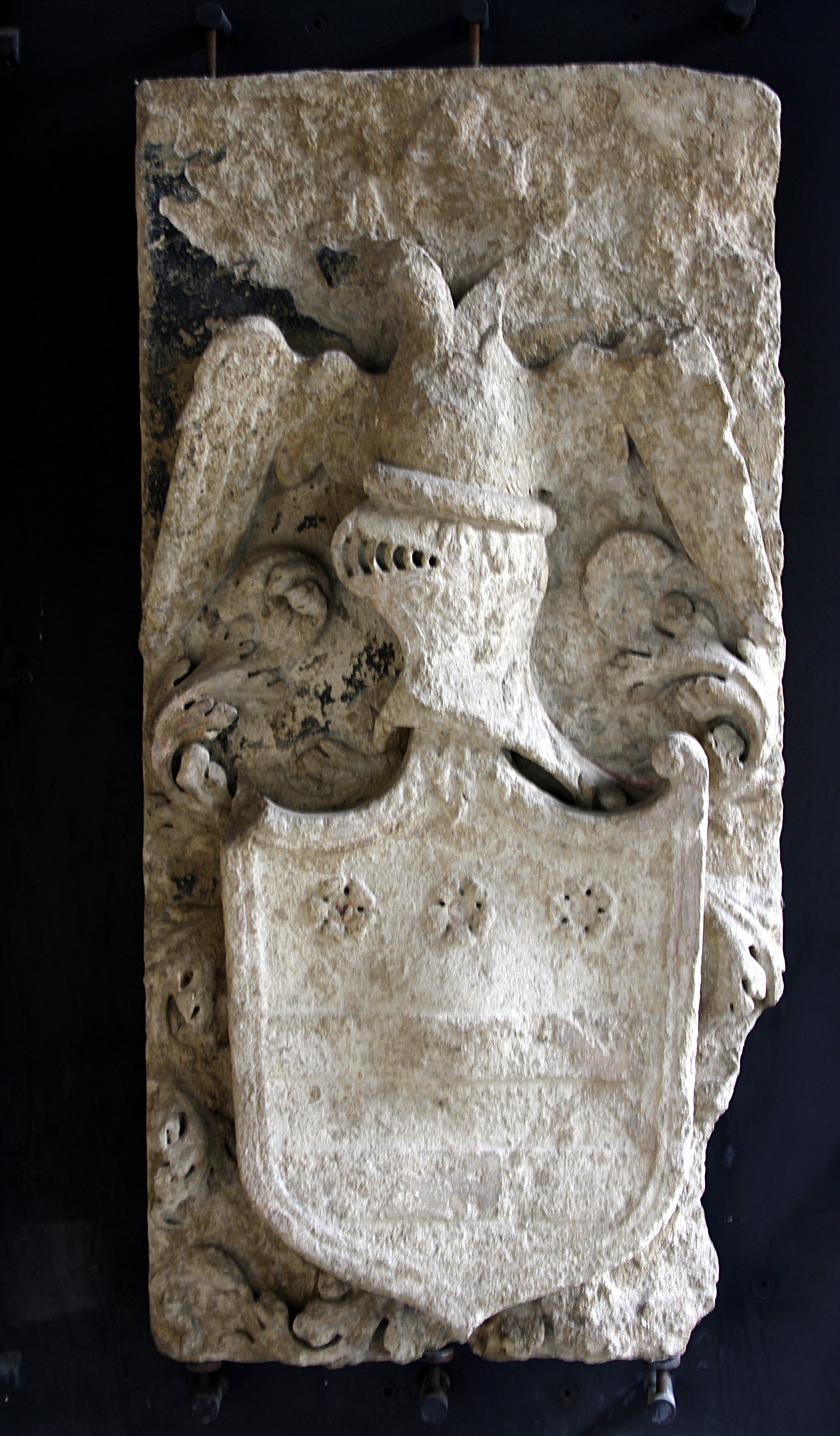
A medieval stone rendering of the arms of the Donà dalle Rose, held at the Musei civici di Padova

The family has had a number of seats, including:

- Palazzo Donà dalle Rose (present, primary)
- Palazzo Donà Brusa
- Palazzo Donà Balbi
- Palazzo Donà Giovannelli
- Palazzo Donà-Ottobon

== Bibliography ==
- Davis, James C. (1975). A Venetian Family And Its Fortune: 1500 – 1900. American Philosophical Society. pp. xi. ISBN 0-87169-106-X.
