= Palazzo Donà della Madoneta =

Coordinates: 45°26′11″N 12°19′53″E

The Palazzo Donà della Madoneta is a Gothic-style palace located on the Canal Grande of Venice, between Casa Sicher and Palazzo Donà a Sant'Aponal in the Sestiere of San Polo, Venice, Italy.

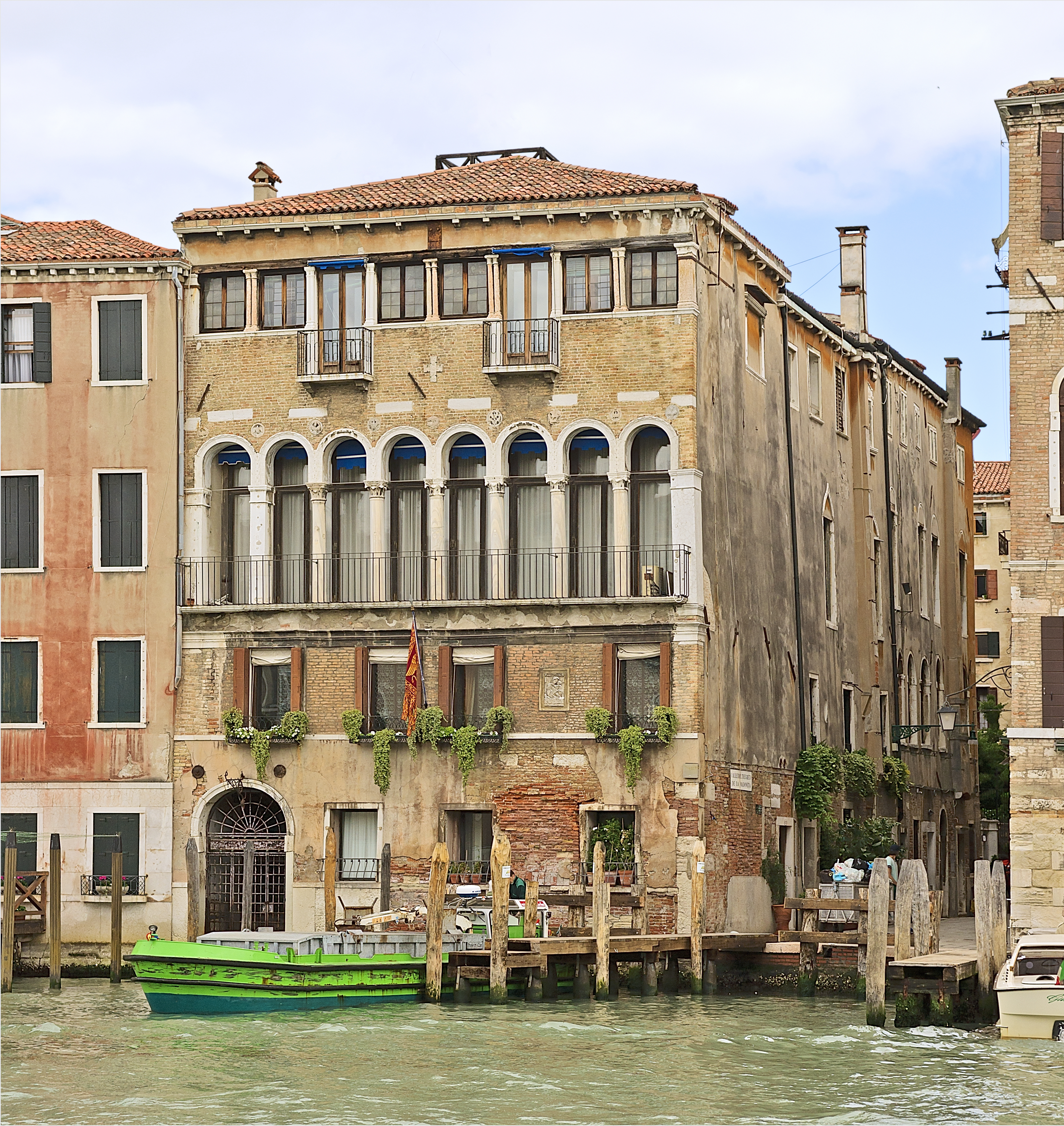
Palazzo Donà della Madoneta

== History ==
The palace was erected in the 13th century by the Signoli family. Subsequent owners include the Donà family and the Dolcetti. In the 19th century, the name della Madoneta was added, when a bas-relief of the Madonna and Angels was added to the façade. The palace has undergone refurbishments over the centuries.

== Bibliography ==
- Brusegan, Marcello (2007). Newton & Compton (ed.). I Palazzi di Venezia. Roma. ISBN 978-88-541-0820-2. Brusegan.
