= Pietro Venier, Governor of Cerigo =

Pietro Venier (died 8 May 1372) was a Governor of Cerigo.

== Ancestry ==
He was a son of Marco Venier, fl. in 1347 and 1363, and wife Caterina ..., paternal grandson of Pietro Venier (died bef. 1360) and wife Bonafemena Quirini, and great-grandson of Marco Venier, Lord of Cerigo, and wife.

== Marriage and issue ==
He married ... and had Francesco Venier (died 1424), who married his cousin Fantina Venier, daughter of Pietro Venier and wife, but died childless.
