= Marco Venier, Marquess of Cerigo =

Marco Venier was a Marquess of Cerigo.

He was Venetian and won his Marquisate as a result of the Fourth Crusade.

== Marriage and issue ==
He married ... and had Bartolommeo Venier, fl. between 1252 and 1275, who married ... and had Marco Venier, Lord of Cerigo.
