= Palazzo Donà a Sant'Aponal =

Building in Venice, Italy

Coordinates: 45°26′12″N 12°19′54″E

The Palazzo Donà a Sant'Aponal, also known as the Palazzo Donà or Palazzo Donà dalle Trezze, is a Gothic-style palace located on the Canal Grande of Venice, between Palazzo Papadopoli and Palazzo Donà della Madoneta in the Sestiere of San Polo, Venice, Italy.

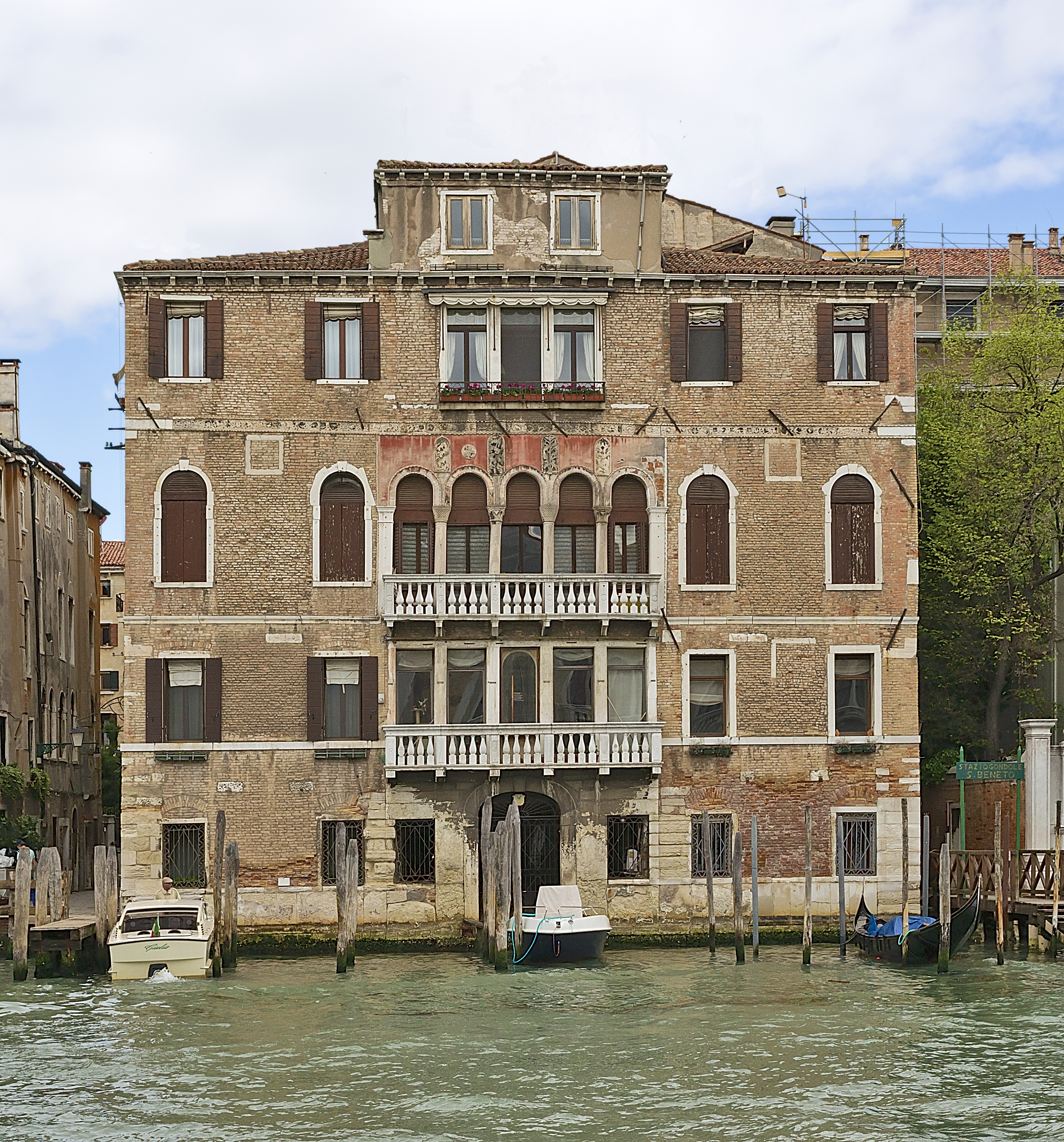
Palazzo Donà a Sant'Aponal

== History ==
The palace was erected in the 14th century by the Zancani family; documents link it to this family in 1314. It was reconstructed in the 15th century, and refurbished in the 17th century.

== Bibliography ==
- Brusegan, Marcello (2007). Newton & Compton (ed.). I Palazzi di Venezia. Roma. ISBN 978-88-541-0820-2. Brusegan.
