= Marco Venier, Lord of Cerigo =

Lord of Cerigo

Marco Venier
- Died: 1311
- Issue: Pietro Venier
- Father: Bartolommeo Venier

Marco Venier (died 1311) was a Lord of Cerigo.

== Ancestry ==
He was a son of Bartolommeo Venier (fl. between 1252 and 1275), and paternal grandson of Marco Venier, Marquess of Cerigo.

== Marriage and issue ==
He married an unknown woman and had Pietro Venier (- bef. 1360), who married Bonafemena Quirini and had Marco Venier, fl. in 1347 and 1363, who married Caterina ... and had Pietro Venier, Governor of Cerigo.
