= Palazzo Donà-Ottobon =

Coordinates: 45.43723°N 12.34255°E

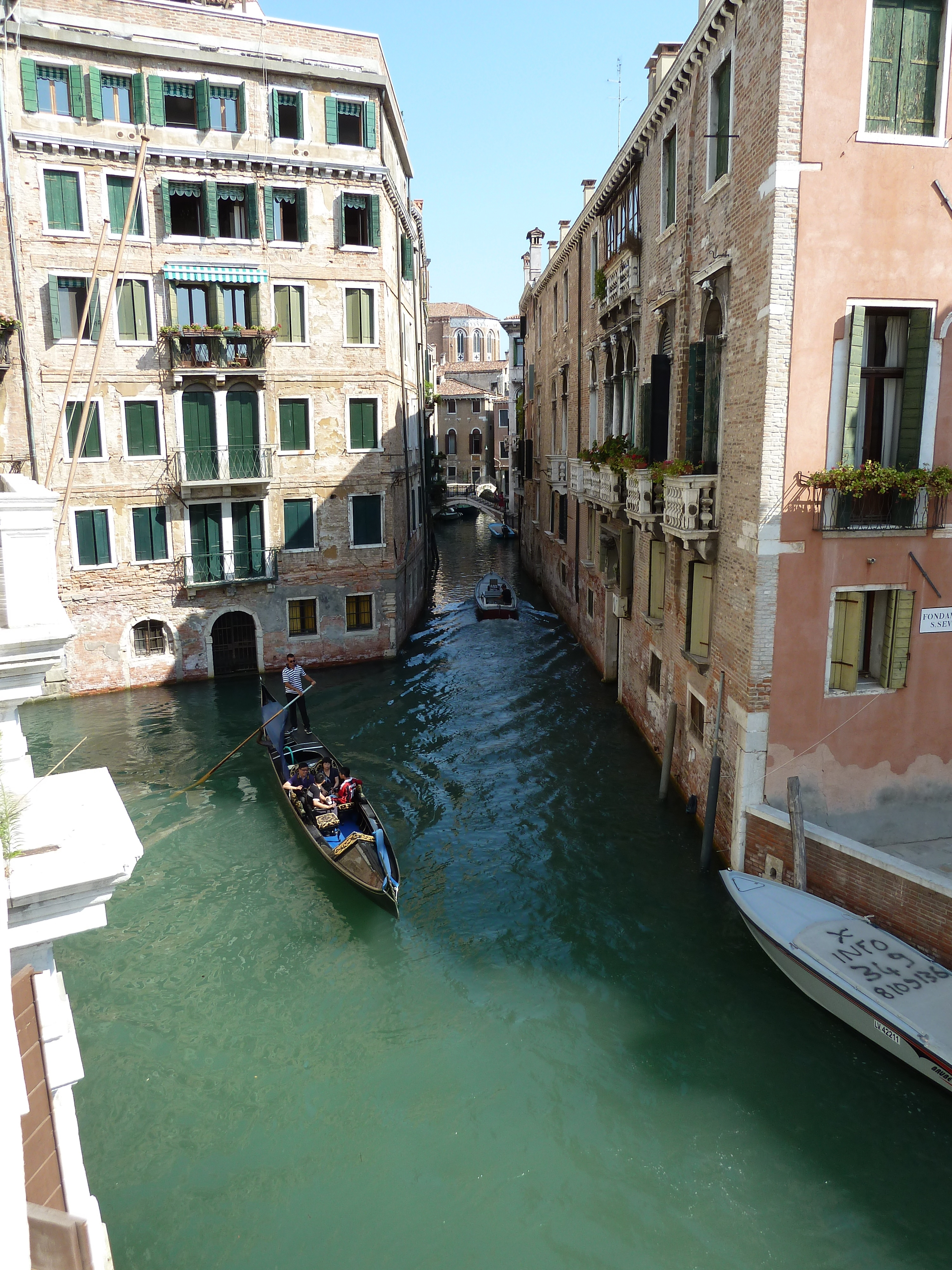
Palace on Right along Rio San Severo

The Palazzo Donà-Ottobon is a palace located at Calle della Madonna on the Fondamenta di San Severo, corner with Calle Larga San Lorenzo, in the Sestiere of Castello in Venice, Italy. The remains of this Venetian Gothic palace are a small corner facade, alongside a canal, with two and a half walled-up gothic arcades in the piano nobile. The portal has an equally awkward marble relief of the Virgin with St Francis, St Claire de Montefalco, and a donor of reduced size. Earlier authors do not mention this portal.

== History ==
By 1514, the palace was documented to belong to a Marco Donà, and two carved stones at the entrance sported the family shield. There is another Palazzo Donà della Madoneta on the Grand Canal shore of the Sestiere of San Polo. The palace at San Severo remained in this family till 1582 when it appears to have been sold to two brothers Troilo and Sertorio Altan, who were cloth merchants in Venice and the mainland. The Altàn had built tombs in the church of Sant'Anna and had lent to Donà a sum of money, to obtain the palace at San Severo.

However, the Altàn family fell was to soon extinguish when the brothers were jailed for fraud, and in 1592, Girolamo, son of Troilo was banned while in exile for the murder of Michele Stropelli, who had been an accomplice in the family fraud.

However, by 1597, it was sold again to the brothers Pietro, Marco, and Antonio Ottoboni. Zuanne Francesco Ottoboni had been Grand Chancellor (1559-1575). Marco in 1639 was elected Grand Chancellor, and died in 1646. One of his sons, Pietro, born in 1610 to Vittoria Tornielli, became cardinal in 1651, and Pope Alexander VIII in 1689. In a room of this palace, later converted to oratory, there is an epigraph in black stone recalling the birth here of the future pope.

A great-nephew of the pope, returned to Venice in 1726 as a cardinal, Pietro Ottoboni, lived in the palace. This Ottoboni was famous as a patron of musicians and composers. From the Ottoboni, through a maternal line, it passed to the Boncompagni, and Marco Boncompagni Ottoboni, Duke of Fiano, and sold it in 1802 to the cavaliere Alberto Manuch. It passed through a few hands and was willed to the church of San Zaccaria in 1840.
