= San Canciano, Venice =

Church in Venice, Italy

Church of San Canciano
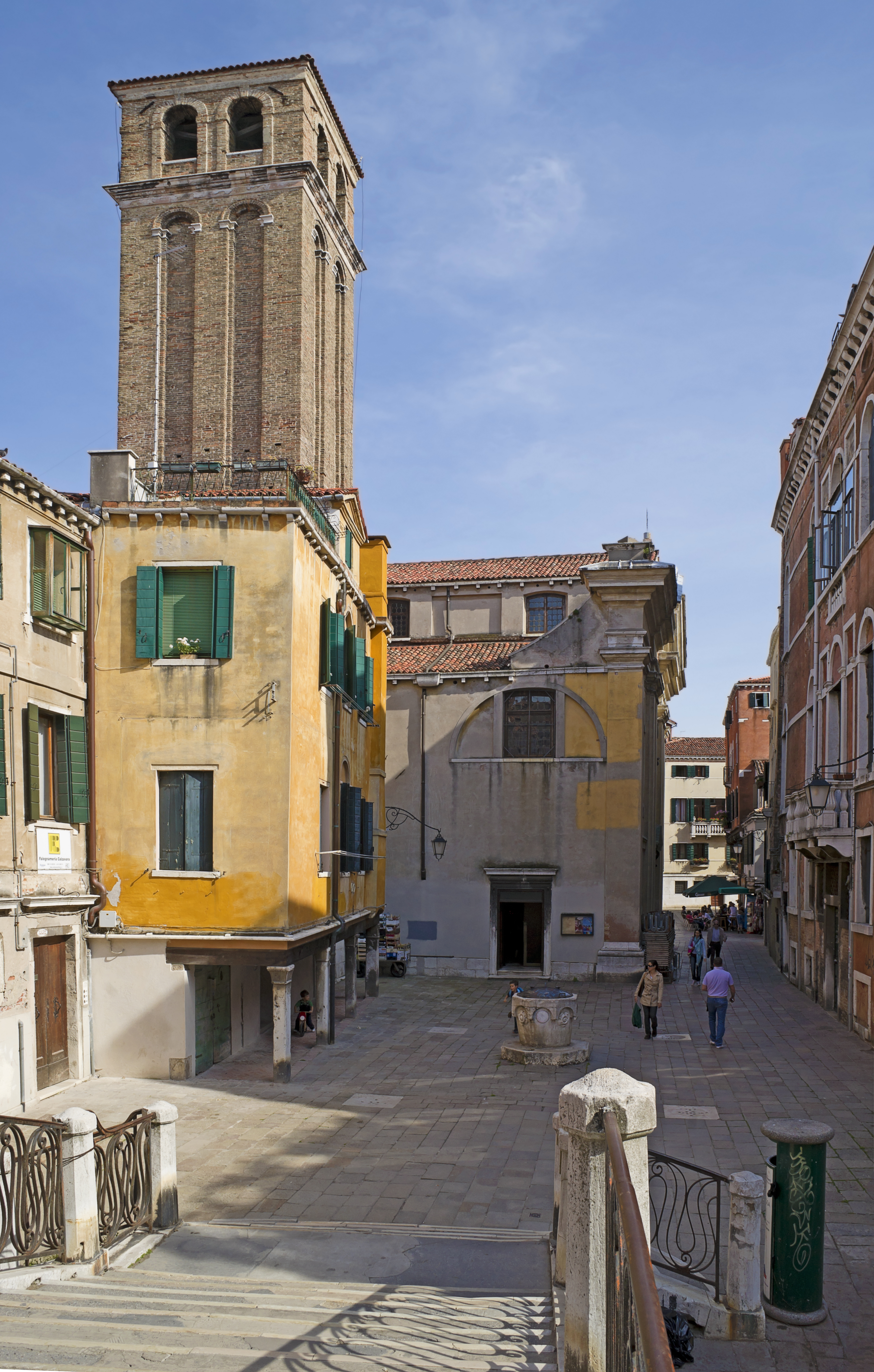
- Church of San Canciano

- Location within Venice

Religion
- Affiliation: Roman Catholic

Location
- Municipality: Venice
- Country: Italy
- Coordinates: 45°26′24″N 12°20′19″E

Architecture
- Architect: Antonio Gaspari
- Type: Church
- Style: Baroque
- Completed: 18th century

The church of San Canciano or San Canziano is a small church in the sestiere (district) of Cannaregio in Venice.

The church was supposedly founded in 864 when citizens from the mainland town of Aquileia fled to the lagoon islands of Venice to avoid the barbarian hordes. It was one of the churches under the jurisdiction of the patriarch of Grado who lived in Venice. It is dedicated to Canzio, Canziano, and Canzianilla, two brothers and a sister who were martyred for their faith at Aquileia. The church at the site was renovated in 1330, consecrated in 1351, and restored in 1550, and again finally reshaped in the early 18th century to a design by Antonio Gaspari. The facade was reconstructed in 1706 using a bequest from Michele Tommasi. The campanile dates from 1532. The nave ceiling was raised during the rebuilding in the mid-18th century using designs of Giorgio Massari.

The four side altars dedicated to the Madonna have canvases by Giuseppe Angeli and Bartolomeo Letterini. The rich sculptural and stucco decoration was contributed by the Widmann family. Clemente Molli sculpted the statue of San Maximus, first bishop of Cittanova in Istria. The chancel altarpiece depicts The Glory of the martyred Saints Canzio, Canziano, and Canzianilla attributed to Paolo Zoppo.It is flanked by a painting of the Probatic Pond and Multiplication of the loaves by Domenico Zanchi.

The chapel on the left dedicated to St Venerando contains an altarpiece of the Madonna and St Filippo Neri by Nicola Ranieri. The Altar of the Immaculate Virgin, second to left, was financed by Flaminio Corner in 1735.

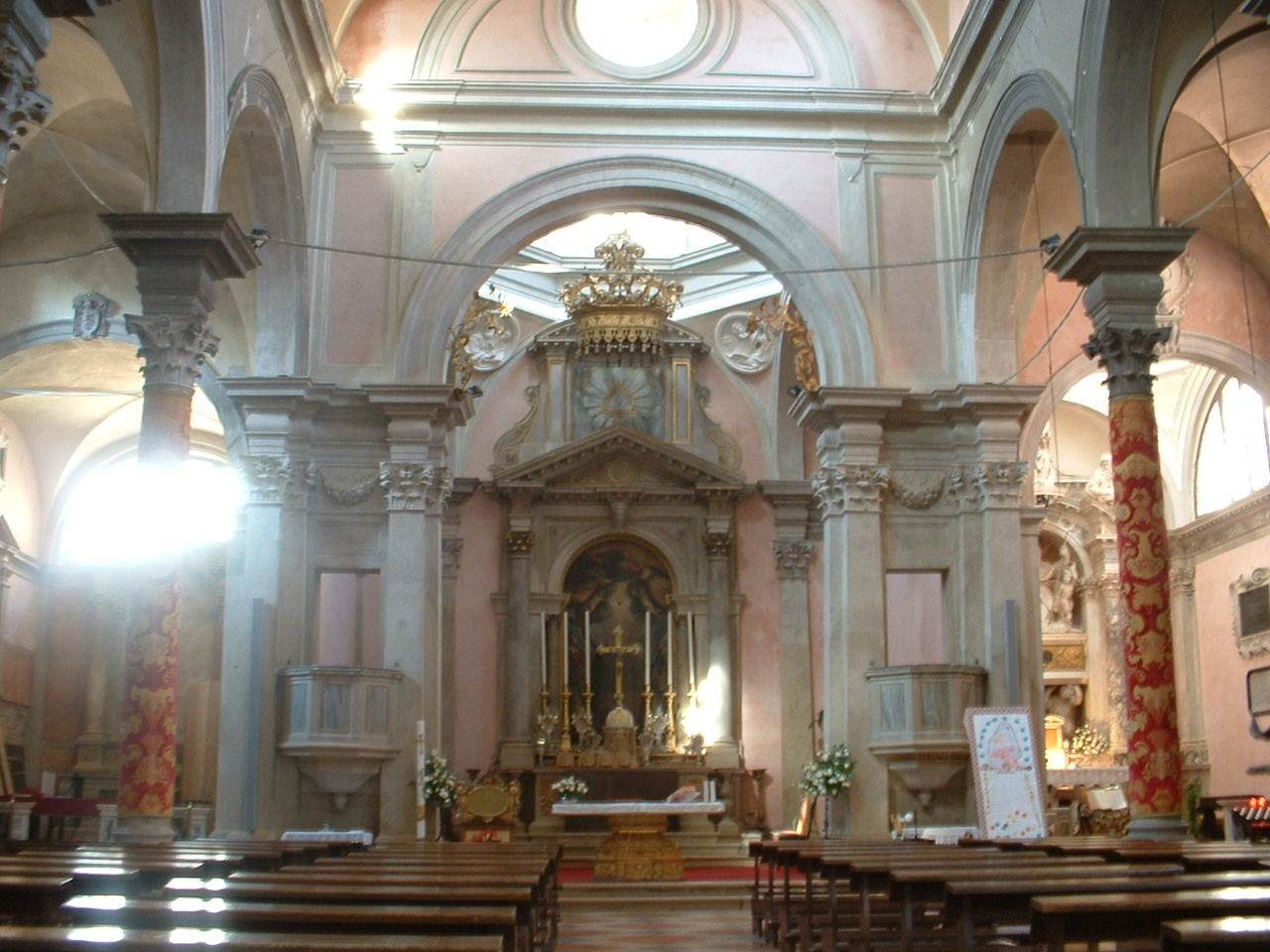
Interior of San Canciano

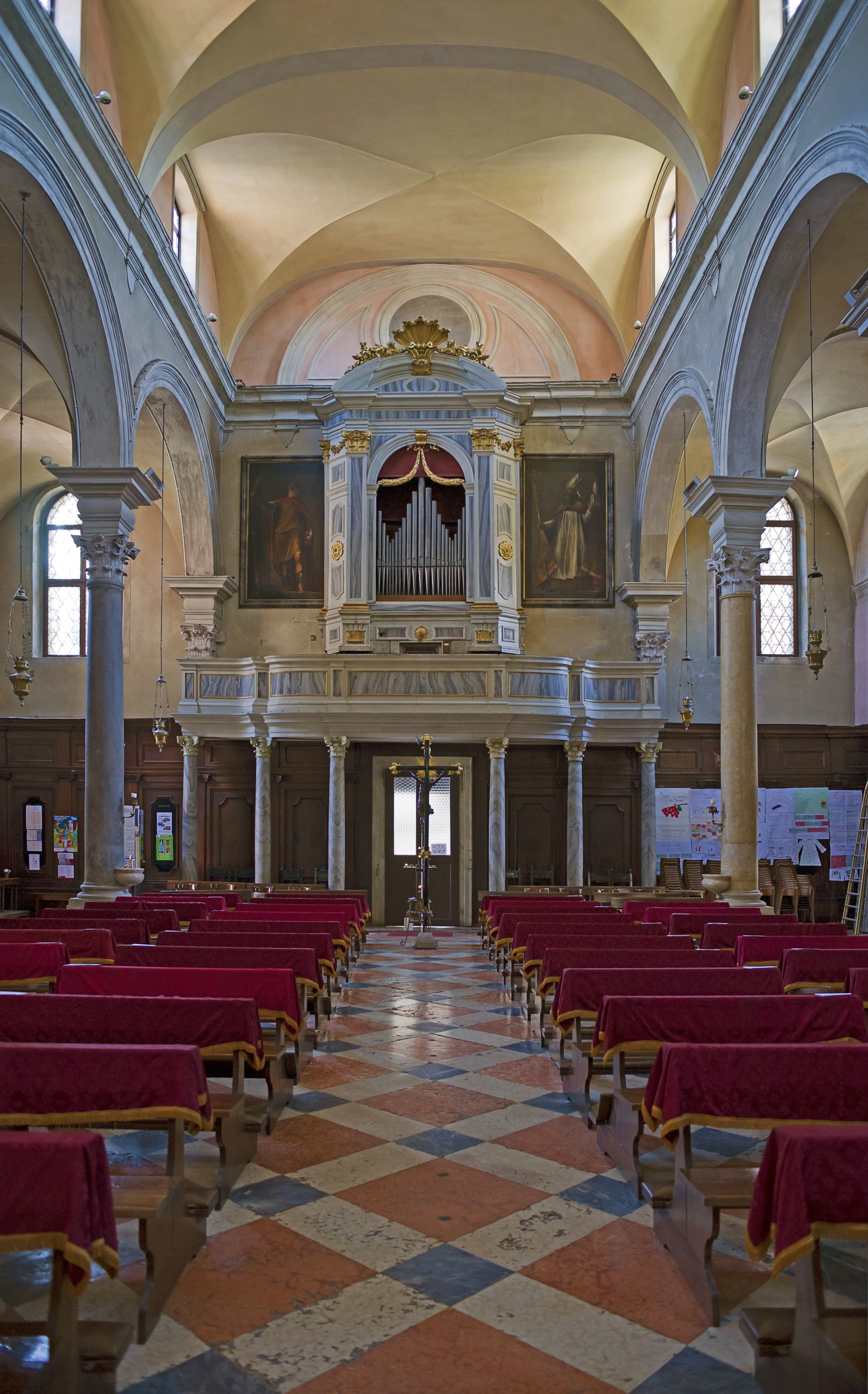
Organ of San Canciano

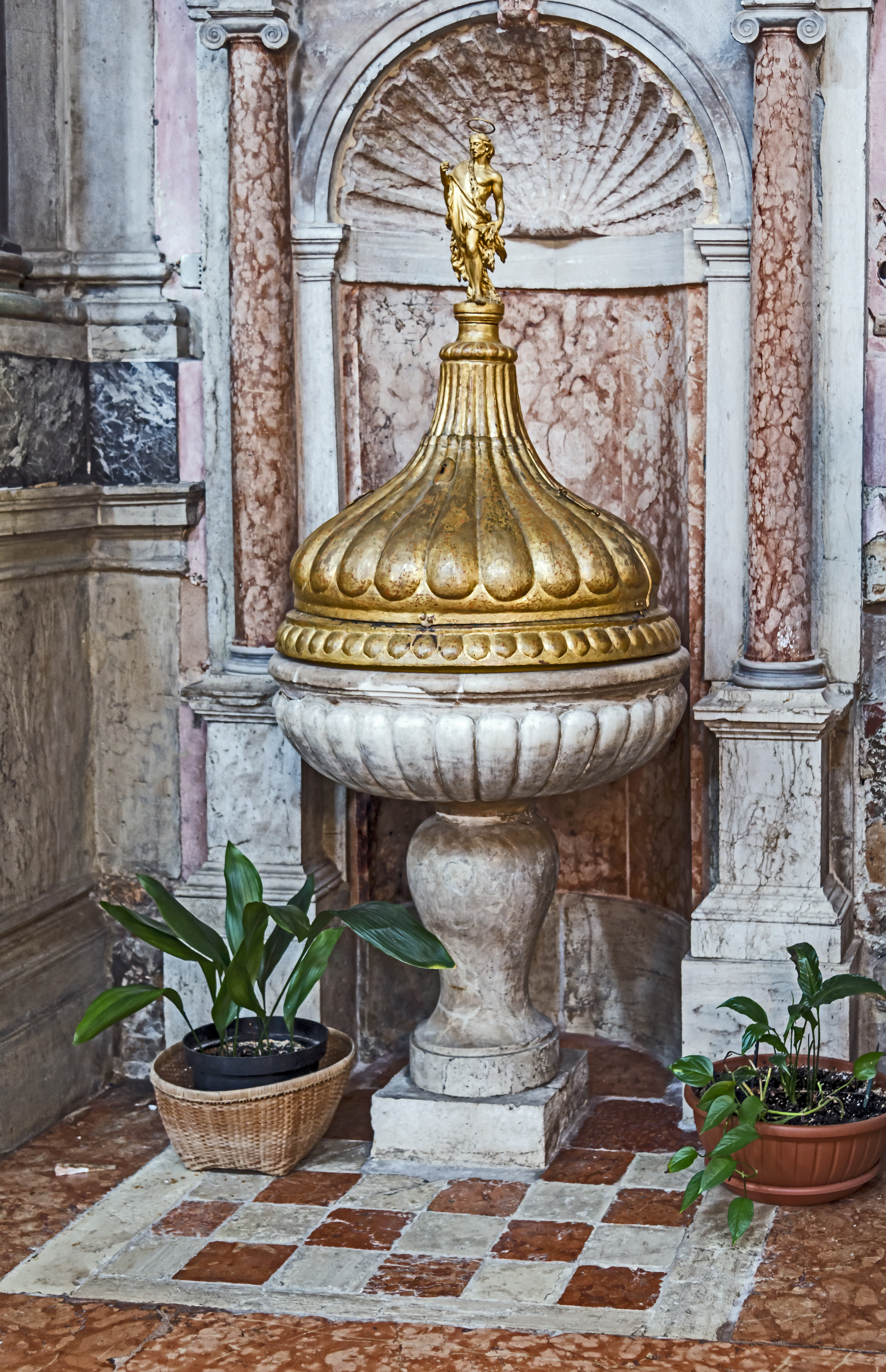
Font of San Canciano
