= Villa Giovanelli Colonna =

Coordinates: 45°24′29″N 11°56′35″E

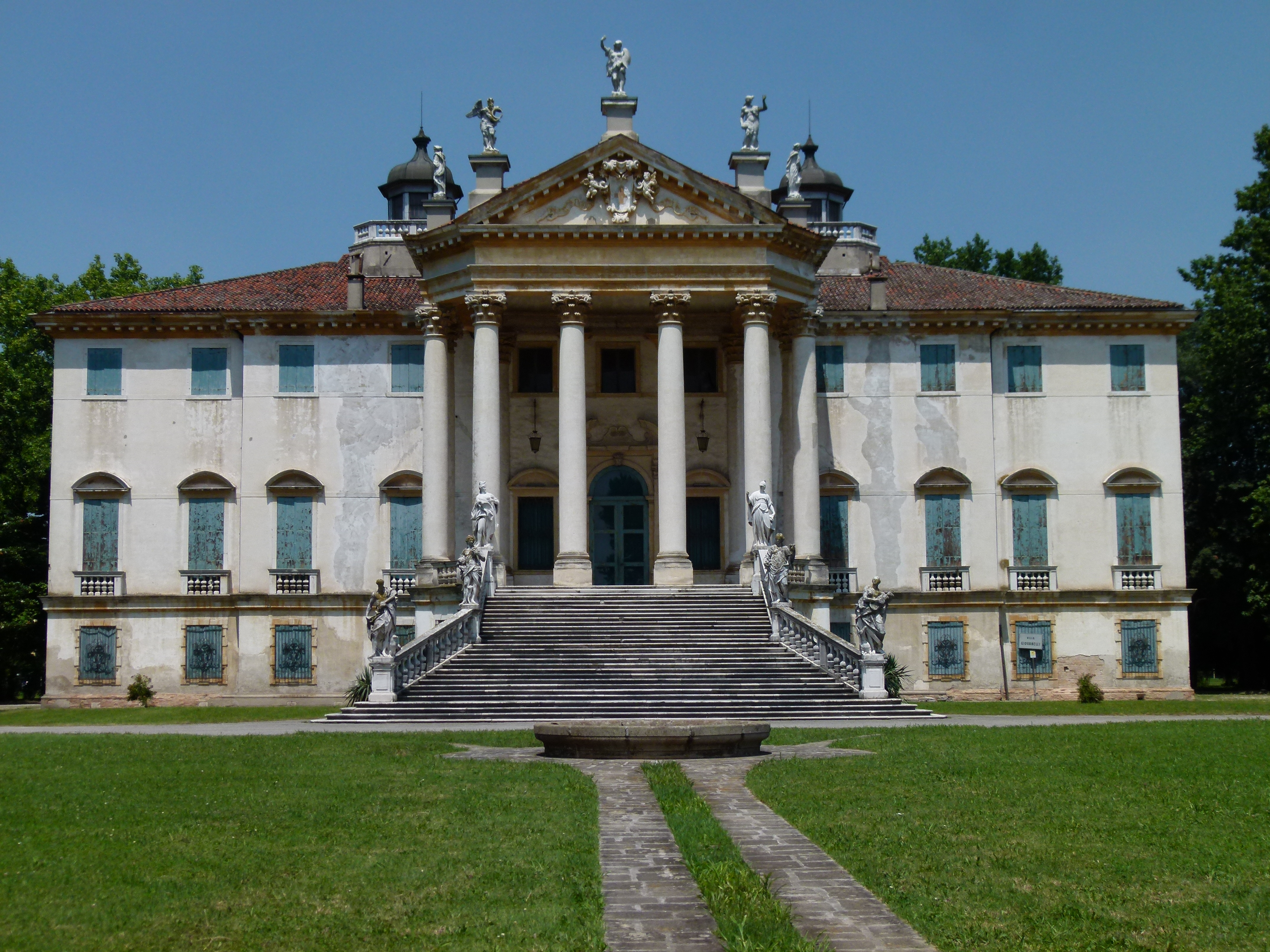

The Villa Giovannelli Colonna is a rural palace located in Noventa Padovana, in the region of the Veneto near Padua, northern Italy, which once was famous for its splendid decorations.

The villa was commissioned in the late 17th century by the Giovanelli family to the architect Antonio Gaspari.

In 1738, on the occasion of Maria Amalia of Saxony, the daughter of the Polish king Augustus II the Strong visiting the villa, who had been married to King Charles of Naples and Sicily, the future Charles III of Spain, Andrea Giovanelli and his brother Benedetto decorated the facade of the Villa with the festive portico and a precious entrance stairway by Giorgio Massari. On the balustrades are six allegorical statues representing the five senses: the Belvedere (sight/male), Il Odorato (smell/male), Il Tatto (touch/female), L'Udire (hearing/female), Il Gusto (taste/female) which are observed by La Ragione (top right). They were executed by Antonio Tarsia, Antonio Gai and by the brothers Paolo and Giuseppe Groppelli.

The interior is frescoed by Sebastiano Ricci and Giuseppe Angeli, who also did the frescos in Villa Widmann-Foscari. The frescos were changed when Federico Maria Giovanelli, Patriarch of Venice, took over the villa. His brothers Giovanni Benedetto and Giovanni Paolo Giovannelli commissioned two large canvases by Luca Carlevarijs. The gardens consist of labyrinths and designs.
