= Palazzo Contarini-Sceriman, Venice =

Medieval palace in Venice, Italy

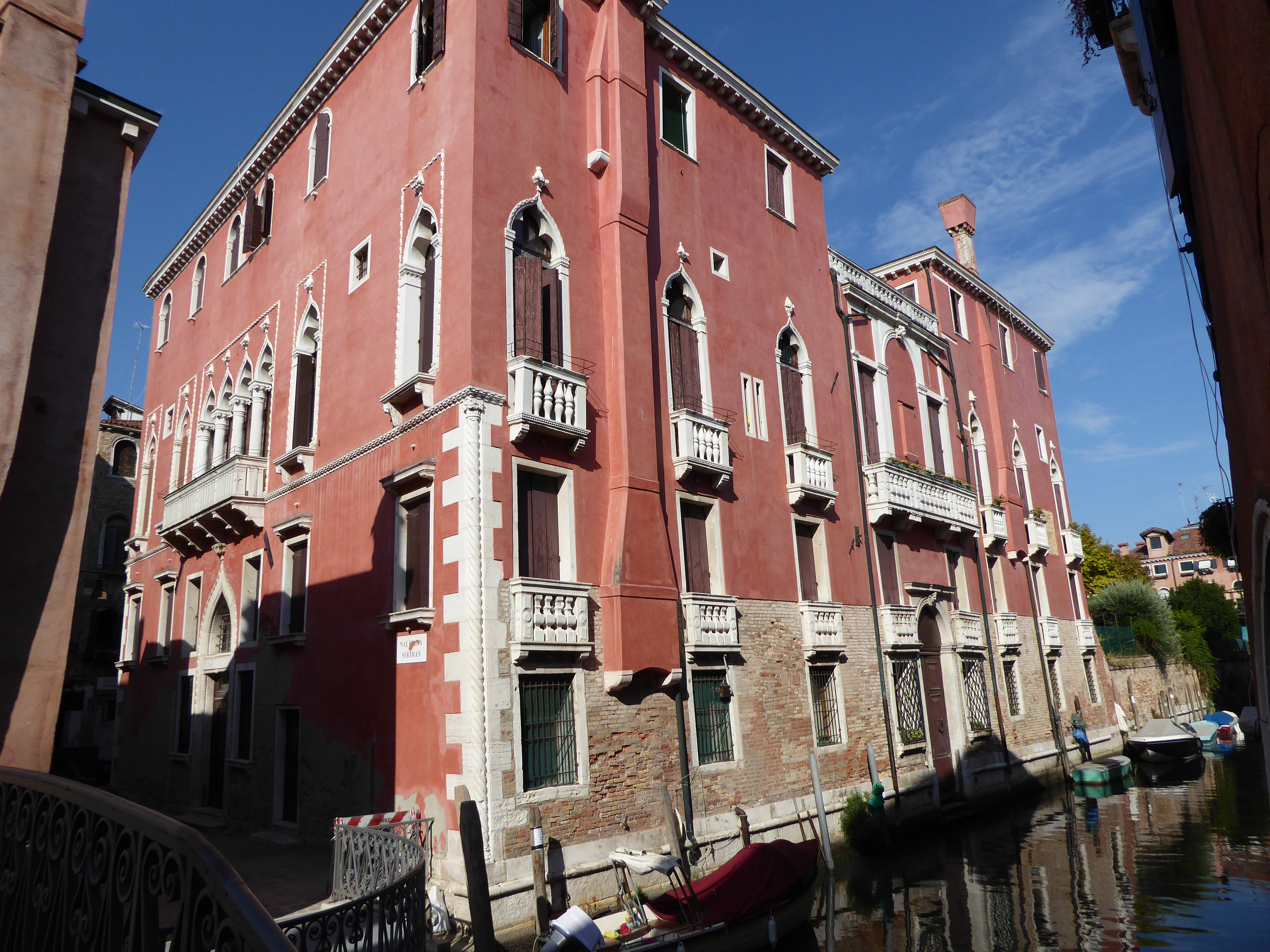
Palazzo Contarini Sceriman (Venice)

The Palazzo Contarini-Sceriman, also called Palazzo Seriman ai Gesuiti, is a 14th-century palace in the Sestiere of Cannaregio of Venice, Italy. It is located near the church of the Gesuiti.

== History ==
The palace was originally erected by the Dolce family in the 14th century, but by the next century it belonged to the Contarini family. In 1628, Contarina Contarini, married to Piero Priuli, sold the palace to Alberto Gozzi, a silk merchant. Gozzi gained access to the aristocracy in 1646 after helping fund the expensive but unsuccessful defense during the Siege of Candia. Gozzi's patronage had also helped erect the Camalodolese convent in San Clemente near Murano, and funded an altar in the church of San Moise.

It was near this palace and the nearby bridge that, around 1675, the aristocrat Leonardo Loredan, descendant of a Doge, was found dead in a boat. The unexplained death was the source of many rumors, claiming accidental death, murder by relatives, or murder by the Inquisitors of the Republic.

The palace housed for a time the Accademia degli Industriosi, a salon of literature and debate, until it moved to the academy of industrious, before conveyed in Cà Morosini in San Canciano. In 1698 another Alberto Gozzi, descendant of the Gozzi above, endowed the property to the four charitable hospitals in the city, the Incurabili, Pietà, Mendicanti, and the Ospedaletto, in addition to the Monastery of the Convertite. His wife Adriana Dona was allowed to remain in the palace until 1725. The next year, the palace was then auctioned and purchased by Stefano Sceriman. The Sceriman family was originally an Armenian merchant family from Isfahan. Stefano had been awarded Roman citizenship by Pope Innocent XII, and was named Count of Hungary by Emperor Leopold I. The family had gained importance in Venice during the 17th century. In 1850, Giovanni Battista Sceriman willed the palace to the Institute Manin. In 1884, it became the home of the Casa generalizia dell'Istituto delle Ancelle di Gesù Bambino.

The palace has undergone a number of reconstructions, leading to an eclectic combination of various styles, including Venetian Gothic. Another facade on Rio dei Sartori has similar windows. The main entrance stairwell was painted with the Apotheosis of the Sceriman Family by the school of Tiepolo.
