= Sceriman family =

Wealthy Safavid merchant family of Armenian ethnicity

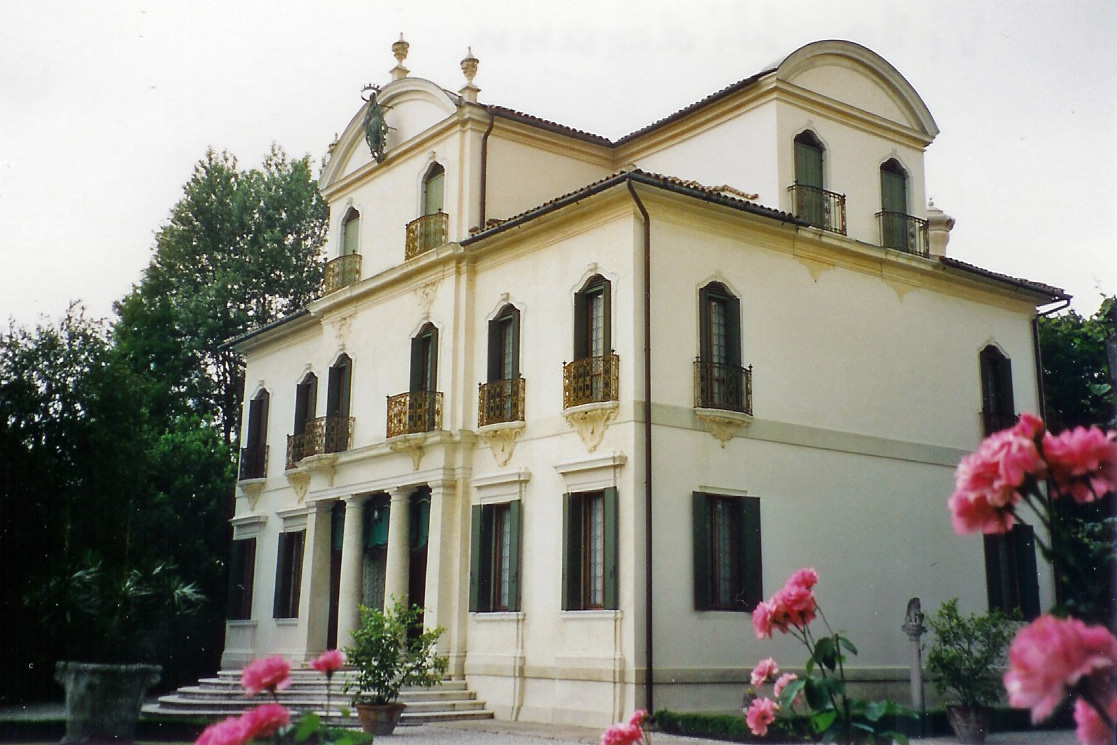
The Villa Sceriman Widmann Rezzonico Foscari, owned by the Scerimans in the 18th century

The Sceriman family, also referred to as the Shahremanian, Shahremanean, Shahrimanian, Shehrimanian, Shariman, or Seriman (Note: "Venetianized spelling".) family, were a wealthy Safavid merchant family of Armenian ethnicity. A Catholic family, they had their roots in early 17th-century New Julfa (the Armenian quarter of Isfahan, Iran), and relatively quickly came to preside over branches all over the world, stretching from Italy (mostly Venice) in the west, to Pegu (Burma) in the east. Apart from being renowned as a trader's family, some Scerimans were high-ranking individuals in the Safavid state, including in its military, religious, and bureaucratic systems. Later, similar positions were obtained abroad, such as in the various Italian city-states and the Austro-Hungarian Empire. They especially became renowned in the Republic of Venice, where they were well integrated into its ruling class. Nevertheless, until their decline in the late 1790s and eventual inactivity in the 19th century, they remained bound to their original base in Iran.

Despite their success, the Scerimans helped create a rift in the Armenian community of Iran. Due to their prominent position in society, their support of the Catholic faith created a strong sense of hostility between the majority Gregorian Armenians and minority Catholic Armenians.

== History ==
=== Early years ===
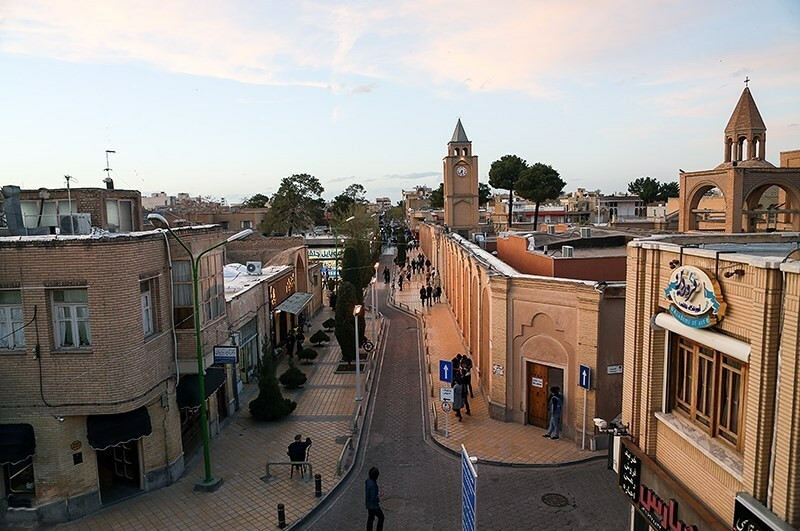
Picture of New Julfa, Isfahan

The ancestors of the Scerimans were from the Armenian-populated territories of the Safavid Empire, specifically from the town of Jugha ("Old Julfa"), and were amongst those that were deported during Shah Abbas I's (r. 1588–1629) mass relocation of his empire's ethnic Armenian inhabitants in 1604. Historian Sebouh Aslanian says that some Armenian sources from the post-deportation period claim a noble status for the family, stating that the family belonged to an ancient clan of nobles (nakharars), with possible roots in the historical Armenian city of Ani. After they were settled in the early 17th century in the new Armenian quarter of New Julfa within the boundaries of the city of Isfahan in central Iran, they started to be a pivotal factor in the internal and external commerce of the Safavid Empire. They accomplished this by making extensive use of their contacts both inside and outside the Safavid realm.

The Scerimans were reputedly both the most influential and the richest amongst all Catholic Armenian families in New Julfa. The first patriarch of the family, Agha Morad, was from Jugha. Nothing is known about his life in Old Julfa, or about his career in New Julfa. One of his sons, Shahriman, carried on the line. The family is named after him. It was in the mid-17th century under Shahriman's son, Khvajeh Sarhat, that the family's wealth, prestige, and influence grew. Unlike other Armenian merchants from Julfa, the Scerimans by origin and specialisation focused primarily on diamonds and gems, whereas most other Armenians from Julfa specialized in the silk trade with Europe. As a family firm, the Scerimans followed the principle of the oldest man being in charge of the business and ventures, as well as having "patriarchial and managerial authority" over his siblings and their own families. In 1646, Sarhat, who functioned as the main patriarch of the family, abjured from the Armenian Apostolic Church (i.e. Gregorianism) and converted to Catholicism. Other members would formally follow later. Over the years, the Scerimans played an important role in the creation of a rift in the Armenian community of Iran. Due to their prominent position in society, they, as heralds of the Catholic faith, created a strong sense of hostility between the majority Gregorian Armenians and minority Catholic Armenians.

=== Consolidation ===
The eldest son of Sarhat, Zachariah, functioned as a royal merchant on behalf of Shah Suleiman I (r. 1666–1694) and grand vizier Shaykh Ali Khan Zanganeh (1669–1689). Zachariah played a pivotal role in the ratification of Tsar Alexis's (r. 1645–1676) decree which granted merchants from New Julfa special trade privileges for using the Russian route for the Safavid silk export to Europe. In the same period, the Scerimans started to search for ways to expand their influence. As early as 1613, the Scerimans owned property (a house) in Venice. They used it for their family members and agents whenever needed. After the 1650s, other sons of Sarhat increased the family's holdings in Italy. In the 1650s and 1660s, Sarhat's fourth son, Gaspar, spent long periods of time in various Italian cities, including Venice, Livorno, and Rome. In the 1690s, Nazar and Shahriman, sons of Morad di Sceriman, (Note: Also spelled "Murat di Sceriman". He was another son of Khvajeh Sarhat.) invested roughly 720,000 ducats into various banks in Venice. The deed was done by establishing numerous "interest-bearing accounts" and by offering "substantial" loans to the Venetian Republic, which needed them for its wars against the Ottoman Empire. These investments would yield a significant profit later on. At about the same time, a certain "cultural component" is noted as well in the Scerimans' fixation on the Italian city-states.

In 1684, an additional eleven members of the family in New Julfa converted to Catholicism. Following this, the Scerimans became heralds of the Catholic faith in New Julfa, and were known as "great supporters" of the Vatican. Conversion was certainly not without interests; as the Vatican profited from the Scerimans in the course of the 1680s (with the family still stationed in New Julfa), a papal bull was issued in 1696 which granted the Scerimans full Roman citizenship and trade-related privileges in numerous Italian cities, including Rome. Shortly after 1684, then grand vizier Shaykh Ali Khan Zanganeh employed a son of Zachariah as his own private merchant. In 1691, a chapel that had been built by the Jesuits in Isfahan in 1662 was enlarged with financial assistance from the Sceriman family.

=== Further success ===
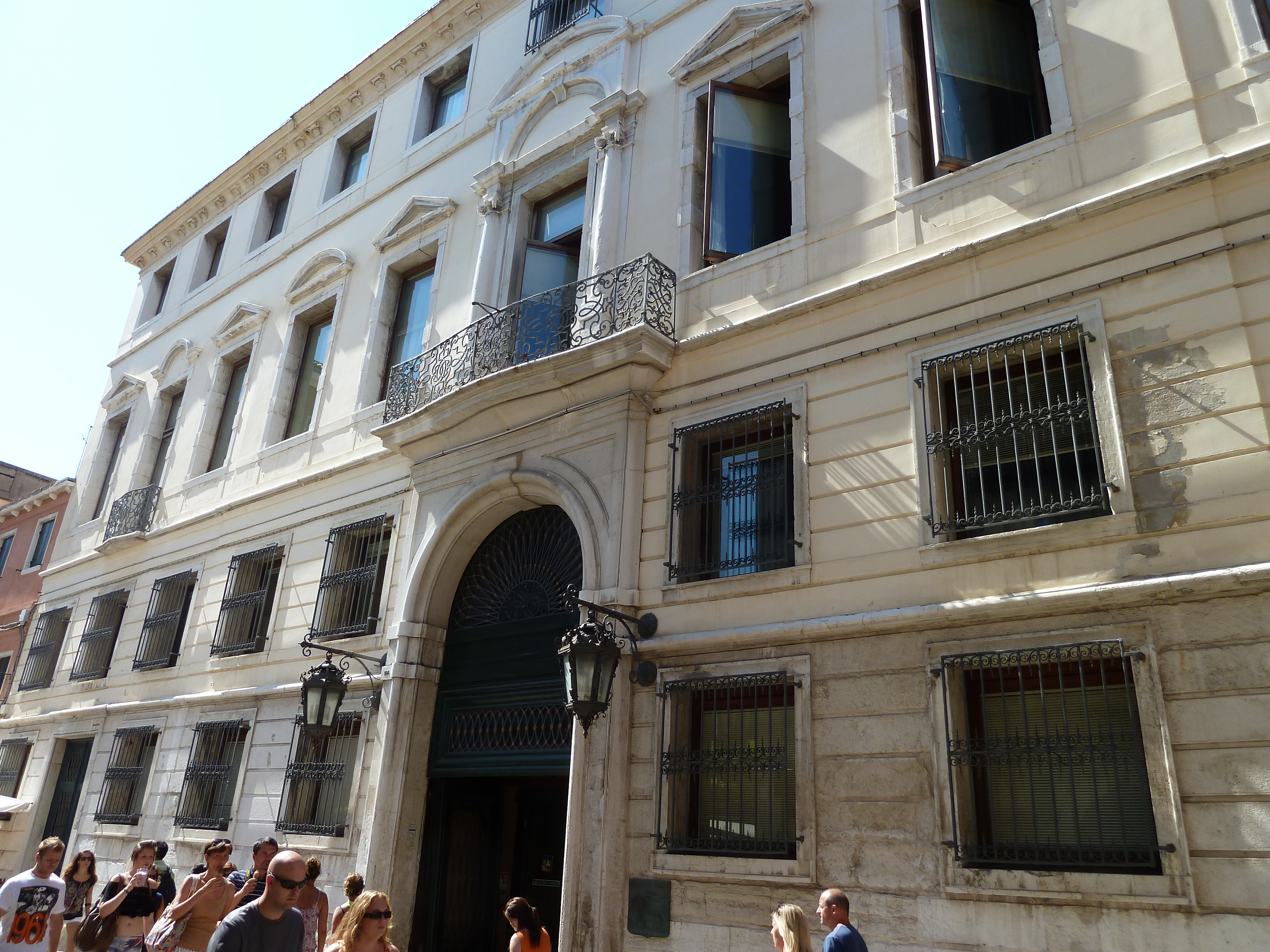
The Palazzo Zeno Manin Sceriman in Venice

Further success came with the turn of the 18th century. In 1699, on the recommendation of the Papacy, Leopold I (r. 1658–1705), then ruler of the Austro-Hungarian Empire, granted the Scerimans titles of Counts in Hungary. In the same year, based on a report sent to the Congregation for the Propagation of the Faith (Propaganda Fide) in Rome, it was evident that the Scerimans had some 50 servants and up to a 100 agents in the royal capital of Isfahan alone. Around the same time, as a result of the loan given several years earlier, the Scerimans were given numerous privileges by the Senate of the Republic of Venice. A climactic point was reached in the mid-18th century, as members of the family were raised to the class of nobility in numerous Italian city-states. Even though their efforts to join the Venetian Patriciate, which they had started in the early 18th century, did not succeed, they were well integrated in the ruling class of the Venetian Republic via marriage alliances with several noble Venetian families. Their prestige as foreigners in the Venetian state was also increased by being well-integrated into the hierarchy of the Catholic Church. For example, Basilio, son of Gaspar Sceriman, was, according to D. Maxwell White, given the position of a monsignor and later even became governor of several administrative regions. Another family member, Domenico Sceriman, became a bishop after being elected. Around that time, family member David Sceriman was likely the richest Armenian in Livorno. In the 1760s, another Sceriman in Venice, Zaccaria di Sceriman (whose mother was a Venetian noblewoman), would become a renowned writer and satirist.

=== Decline, inactivity and assessment ===
The Sceriman headquarters continued to function until the late 1790s in Venice and Livorno. Subsequently, their business fortunes diminished. In the first few years after moving the headquarters to Venice, the office was often in contact with its branch in New Julfa, as the latter was an integral part of the family's ventures.

Even though the Scerimans enjoyed success abroad, it came at a costly price. Their close alignment with the Catholics had alienated the family from the Armenian Church hierarchy at New Julfa. Catholic Armenians were considered outsiders by Gregorian Armenians, and were dubbed Frangs (i.e. "Franks"). Continued spending on matters related to the Catholic faith raised doubts among Safavid officials about the loyalty of the Armenian Catholics in the empire. At the same time, the Gregorian Armenians lobbied inside and outside the court to incite measures against the Catholic Armenians. In 1694, when anti-Catholic sentiments in New Julfa were at a high point, fueled by Shah Sultan Husayn (r. 1694–1722), the family received most of the impact. In 1698, burdened by fellow Armenians and increasing taxes, Khvajeh Gaspar and his family decided to settle in Venice. His older brother, Khvajeh Marcara, followed shortly after with his family. Nevertheless, the Scerimans maintained a continuous presence in their ancestral New Julfa, as other Sceriman branches continued to live there. The headquarters, however, were moved to Venice and Livorno, where several Sceriman members had settled.

Even though the Scerimans are mostly known for their tight relations with the Safavids and later the Italian city-states and Austro-Hungary, they were also represented (especially through junior members), when needed, in Russia, India, the Netherlands, Burma, Spain, and Malacca.

Sebouh Aslanian cites two reasons why maintaining the Julfa branch following the relocation was of extreme importance to the family. The first reason was that, traditionally, the most lucrative capital-generating markets for the family were in Southeastern Asia and India. Hence, a well-located regional office in New Julfa was pivotal in connecting the Mediterranean ventures of the family with those of the gem market around the Indian Ocean. The second reason was that, even though the Scerimans were eager to integrate and assimilate in Italy, they still were Julfan Armenians by origin, "at least as far as their trading habits were concerned". The Scerimans were a calculating and strategizing group of individuals, who not only thought about their future enterprises, but were equally concerned about their situation in foreign lands. Even though they travelled far and wide, they remained bound to their original home in New Julfa through "language, personal relationships, or otherwise".

== See also ==
- List of Iranian Armenians
- Armenians in Italy
- Palazzo Contarini-Sceriman, Venice
- Villa Widmann-Rezzonico-Foscari
- Safavid–Venetian relations

== Sources ==
- Aslanian, Sebouh; Berberian, Houri (2009). "SCERIMAN FAMILY". In Yarshater, Ehsan (ed.). Encyclopædia Iranica (Online ed.). Encyclopædia Iranica Foundation.
- Aslanian, Sebouh (2011). From the Indian Ocean to the Mediterranean: The Global Trade Networks of Armenian Merchants from New Julfa. University of California Press. pp. 149–154. ISBN 978-0520947573.
- Kostikyan, Kristine (2012). "European Catholic Missionary Propaganda among the Armenian Population of Safavid Iran". In Floor, Willem; Herzig, Edmund (eds.). Iran and the World in the Safavid Age. I.B.Tauris. ISBN 978-1780769905.
- Matthee, Rudi (2008). "JESUITS IN SAFAVID PERSIA". In Yarshater, Ehsan (ed.). Encyclopædia Iranica. Vol. XIV/6: Japan IV. Iranians in Japan–Jobbāʾi. London and New York: Routledge & Kegan Paul. pp. 634–638. ISBN 978-1-934283-07-3.
- Matthee, Rudi (2012). Persia in Crisis: Safavid Decline and the Fall of Isfahan. I.B.Tauris. ISBN 978-1845117450.
- Matthee, Rudi (2015). "ŠAYḴ-ʿALI KHAN ZANGANA". In Yarshater, Ehsan (ed.). Encyclopædia Iranica (Online ed.). Encyclopædia Iranica Foundation.
- Trivellato, Francesca (2011). "Marriage, Commercial Capital, and Business Agency: Transregional Sephardic (and Armenian) Families in the Seventeenth- and Eighteenth-Century Mediterranean". In Johnson, Christopher H.; Sabean, David Warren; Teuscher, Simon; Trivellato, Francesca (eds.). Transregional and Transnational Families in Europe and Beyond: Experiences Since the Middle Ages. Berghahn Books. ISBN 978-0857451842.
