= Noventa =

Noventa may refer to one of the following Italian communes:

- Noventa di Piave, in the province of Venice
- Noventa Padovana, in the province of Padua
- Noventa Vicentina, in the province of Vicenza
