= San Vidal, Venice =

Former church, and now an event and concert hall in Venice

San Vidal
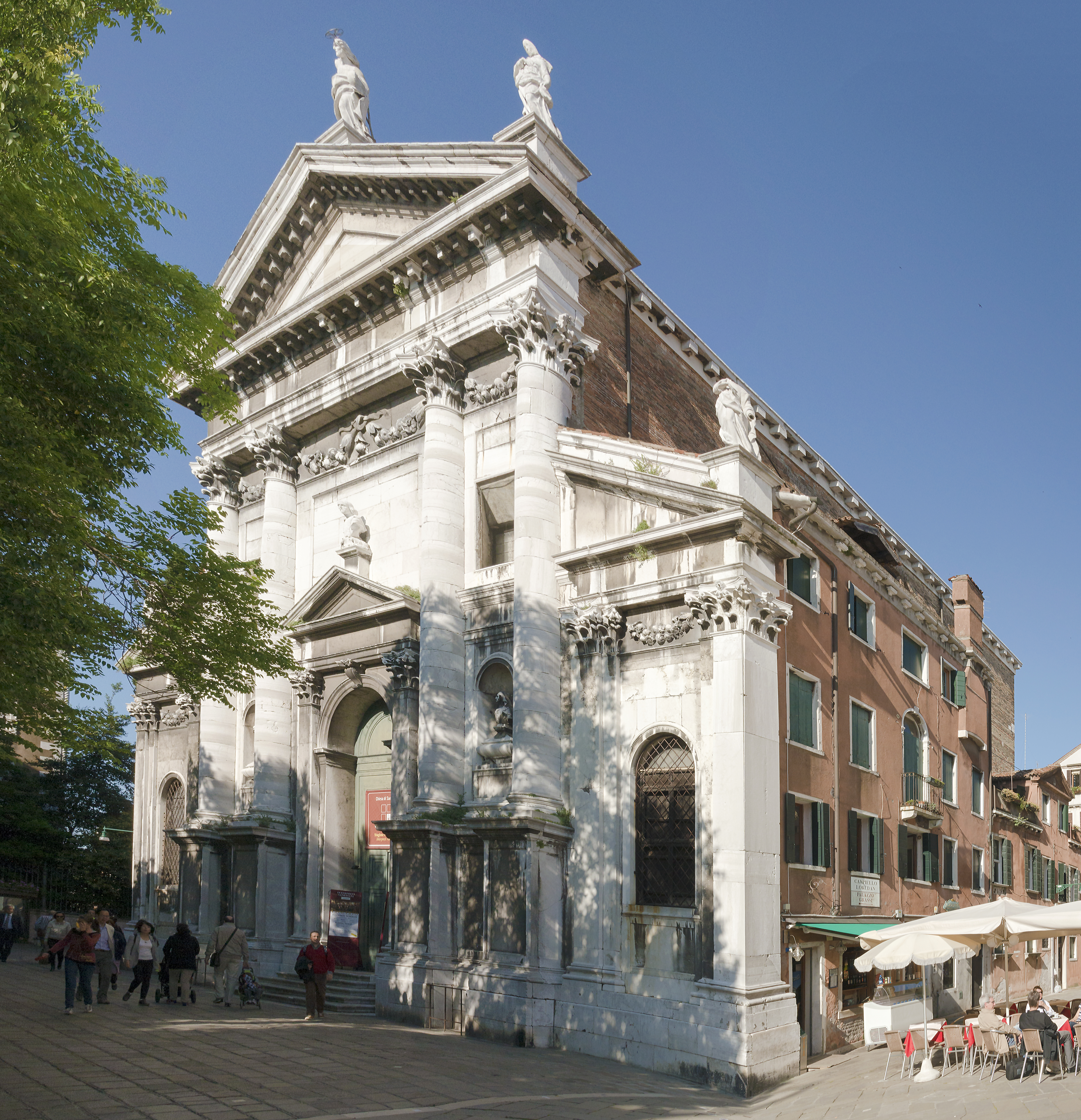
- Facade by Andrea Tirali

- Location within Venice Location within Italy

Religion
- Affiliation: Roman Catholic
- Province: Venice

Location
- Location: Venice, Italy
- Interactive map of San Vidal
- Coordinates: 45°25′57″N 12°19′46″E

Architecture
- Completed: 1084
- Spire height: 29 metres (95 ft)

San Vidal (San Vitale) is a former church, and now an event and concert hall located at one end of the Campo Santo Stefano in the Sestiere of San Marco, where it leads into the campiello San Vidal, and from there to the Ponte dell'Accademia that spans the Grand Canal and connects to the Sestiere of Dorsoduro, Venice, Italy.

== History ==
A church at the site was erected in the year 1084 by Doge Vitale Falier. This church was destroyed in 1105 by a major city fire. Reconstruction continued for centuries and was finished by the 16th century. But poor foundations led to a renewed reconstruction in the 17th century, using designs Antonio Gaspari. It was rebuilt in 1696 to honor the former Doge Francesco Morosini. On the facade (1734–37), designed by Andrea Tirali, are sculpted portraits of the Doge Carlo Contarini and his wife Paolina.

At present in 2022, the church is deconsecrated, and the chamber music group Interpreti Veneziani performs concerts at the church.

== Interior ==
The main altarpiece is a San Vidal on Horseback with eight saints (1514) by Vittore Carpaccio; in the painting, four of the saints flank the saint on a white horse, while four are in the balconies above. The altar is flanked by two marble statues of the allegories of Faith (veiled) and Fortitude by Antonio Gai. The interior also houses an Immaculate Conception by Sebastiano Ricci, a Crucifixion and Apostles by Giulia Lama, a Trinity with Saints Peter and Francesco di Paola by Giovanni Antonio Pellegrini, and a Guardian Angel with St Anthony of Padua and St Cajetan of Thiene by Giovanni Battista Piazzetta.

Although there is no gravestone, the famous composer Baldassarre Galuppi is buried here. His funeral was held in the nearby church of Santo Stefano.

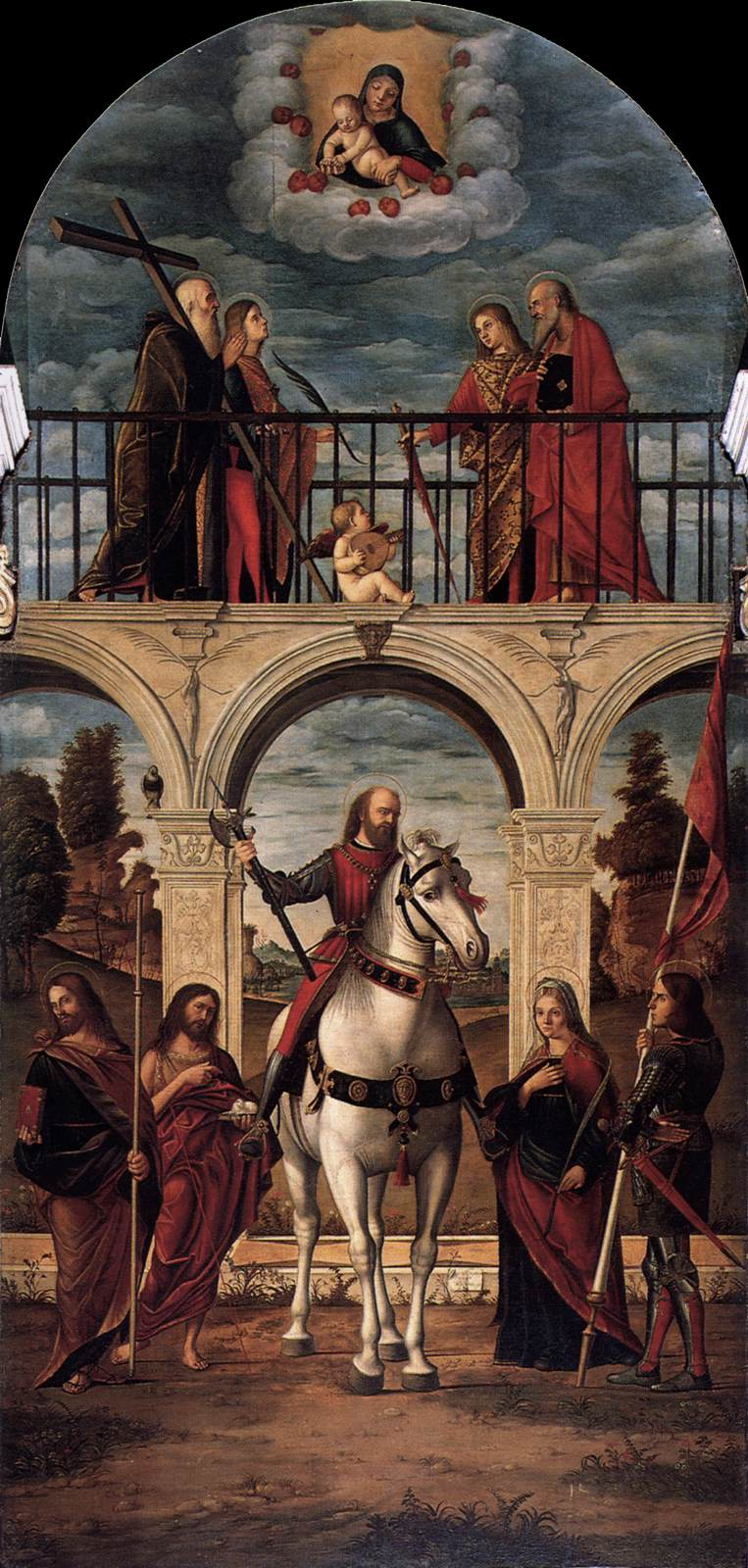
San Vidal on Horseback, main altarpiece by Carpaccio

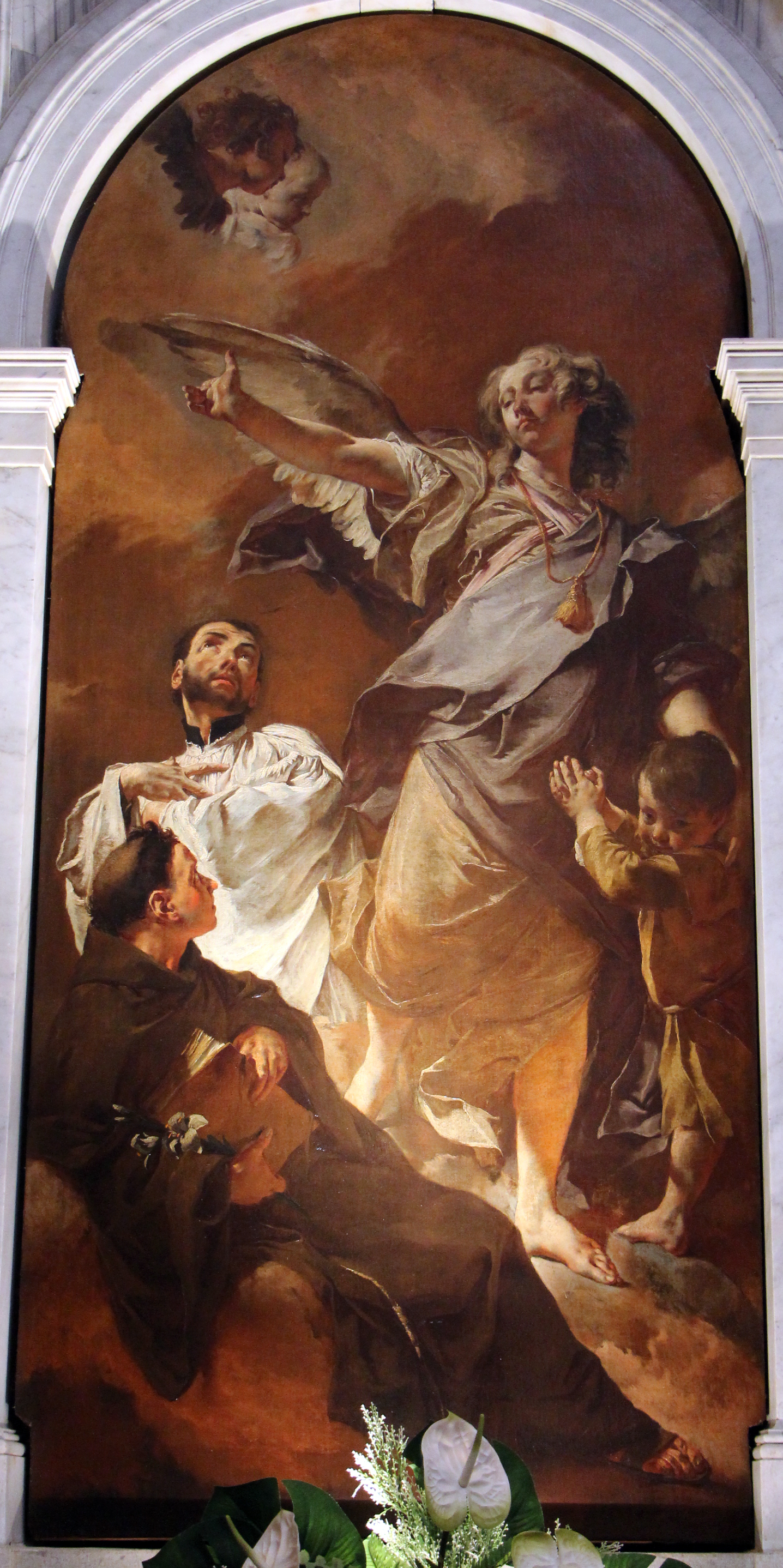
Guardian Angel and Saints Anthony and Cajetan by Piazzetta

== Restoration ==
San Vidal has a 29 m (94 ft) church bell tower, or campanile. It was a part of the original 1084 design and was rebuilt, as was the entire church, after a fire in 1105. It was restored again in 1347 and again in 1680. Evidence of these redesigns can be seen in the inclusion of a 12th Century cornice piece and a stone relief of St Gregory installed above a side door. Additional restoration work was done in 1902 and 2000.

== Sources ==
- Churches of Venice entry
