= Giuseppe Angeli =

Italian painter

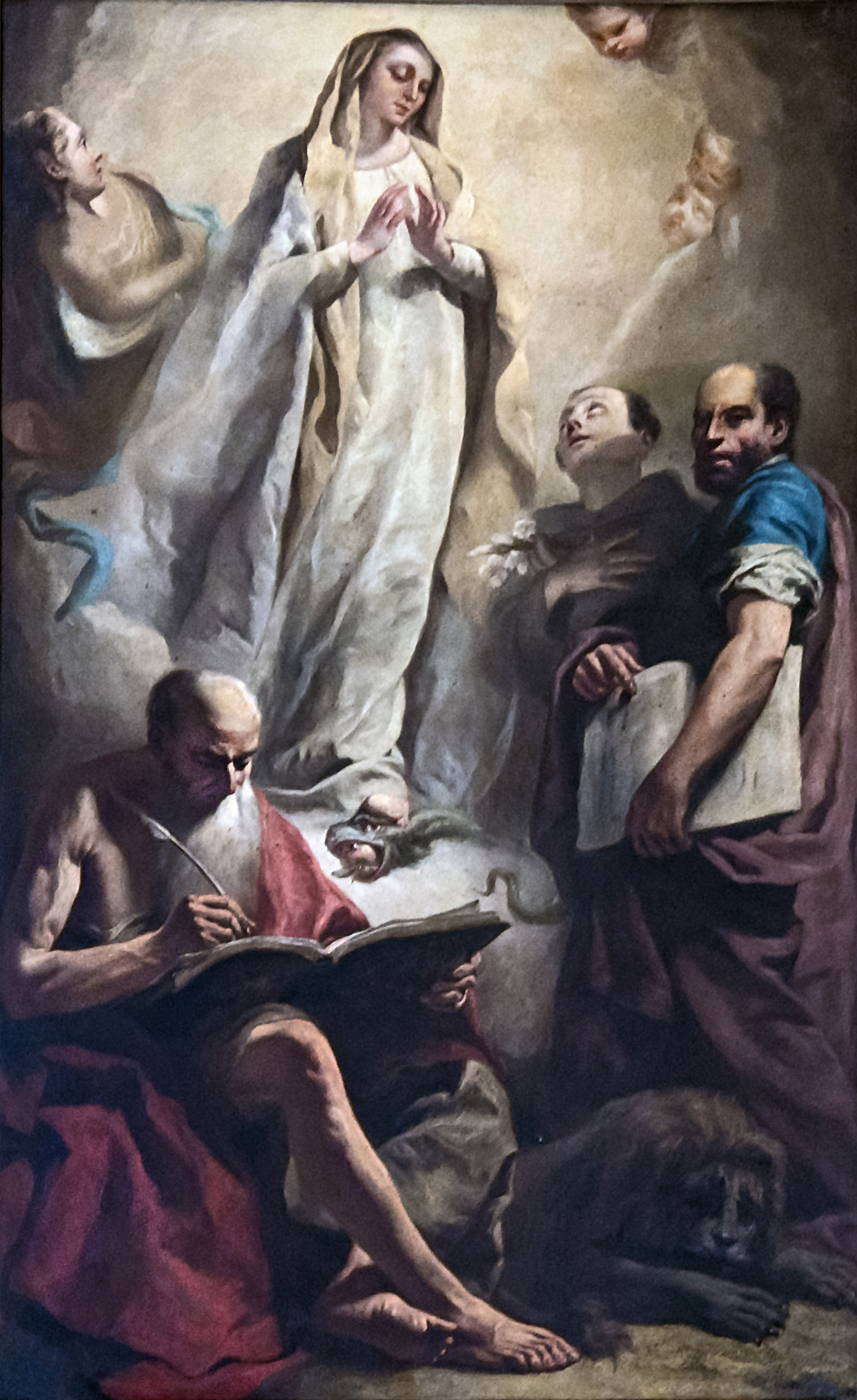
Immaculate Conception with Saints (ca 1760)

Giuseppe Angeli (Venice 1709- Venice, 1798) was an Italian painter of the late Baroque, known for depicting both genre and religious subjects.

== Biography ==
He trained in the studio of Giambattista Piazzetta. By 1741, he was enrolled in the guild of painters. In 1756, he began as an instructor at the Academy of Fine Arts of Venice; in 1772, he became president of the academy.

He is known for two canvases in the church of San Stae and for fresco murals at the Villa Widmann-Foscari at Mira, near Padua. His other works include an Immaculate Conception with Saints (ca. 1760) moved to sacristy of San Francesco della Vigna; two scenes of the Via Crucis for the church of Santa Maria Zobenigo; the altarpiece of St Pietro I Orseolo receives the monk's habit from St Romuald in the church of Santa Maria della Pietà; an Immaculate Conception with Saints in the basilica of Santa Maria Gloriosa dei Frari; an Ecstasy of St Francis in the Sanctuary of the Madonna del Pilastrello at Lendinara; an Apparition of the Virgin to St Simon Stock at the church of Santa Maria Maddalena; the frescoes in the salone of Villa Giovanelli Colonna at Noventa Padovana, a ceiling in the Scuola Grande di San Giovanni Evangelista, and in the Palazzo Barbaro-Curtis in Venice; and a painting of a Soldato con tamburo in the Louvre. The Museum Cerralbo in Madrid owns a portrait of Federico Maria Giovannelli, Patriarch of Venice. The National Gallery of Art in Washington has an oil painting made for San Giorgio in Alga, Venice, of Elijah Taken Up in a Chariot of Fire among its Samuel H. Kress Collection pictures.
