= Villa Cordellina Molin, Montecchio Maggiore =

18th-century Italian villa in Veneto

Villa Cordellina Molin is a rural palace, built in Baroque style in the town of Montecchio Maggiore in region of Veneto, Italy

== History ==
Carlo Cordellina Molin was a well known Venetian architect himself, and inherited from his uncle Molin a farm house at the site around 1735. He engaged Giorgio Massari to design the present villa, with work lasting until 1760. Francesco Muttoni also worked on the villa. Some of the rooms were frescoed (1743) by Giovanni Battista Tiepolo. The son of Carlo, Lodovico Cordellina, owned the villa until the first decade of the 1800s, when it was converted into a boarding school.

In 1943, it passed to Count Gaetano Marzotto, and in 1954 Dr. Vittorio Lombardi restored some of the buildings and the gardens. Anna Maria Lombardi, widow of Dr. Vittorio, ceded the Villa and the adjoining Pizzocaro Chapel to the Province of Vicenza, present owner, and funding the restoration of the frescoes by Tiepolo and the stables.
