= Santa Tecla, Este =

Roman Catholic church in Este, Italy

Santa Tecla is the Baroque-style, Roman Catholic duomo or main church in the town of Este, province of Padua, region of Veneto, Italy.

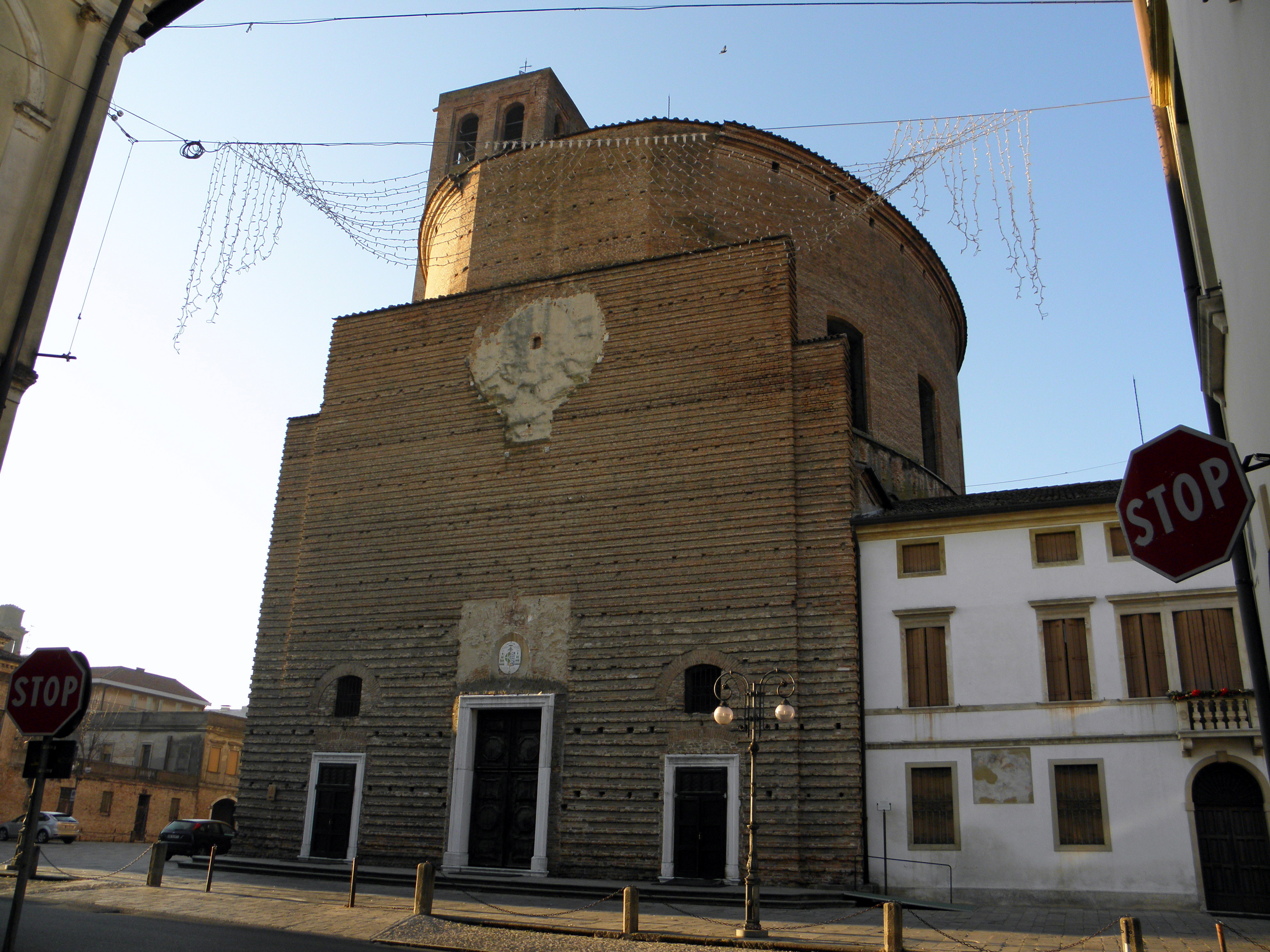
Facade with bell-tower in rear

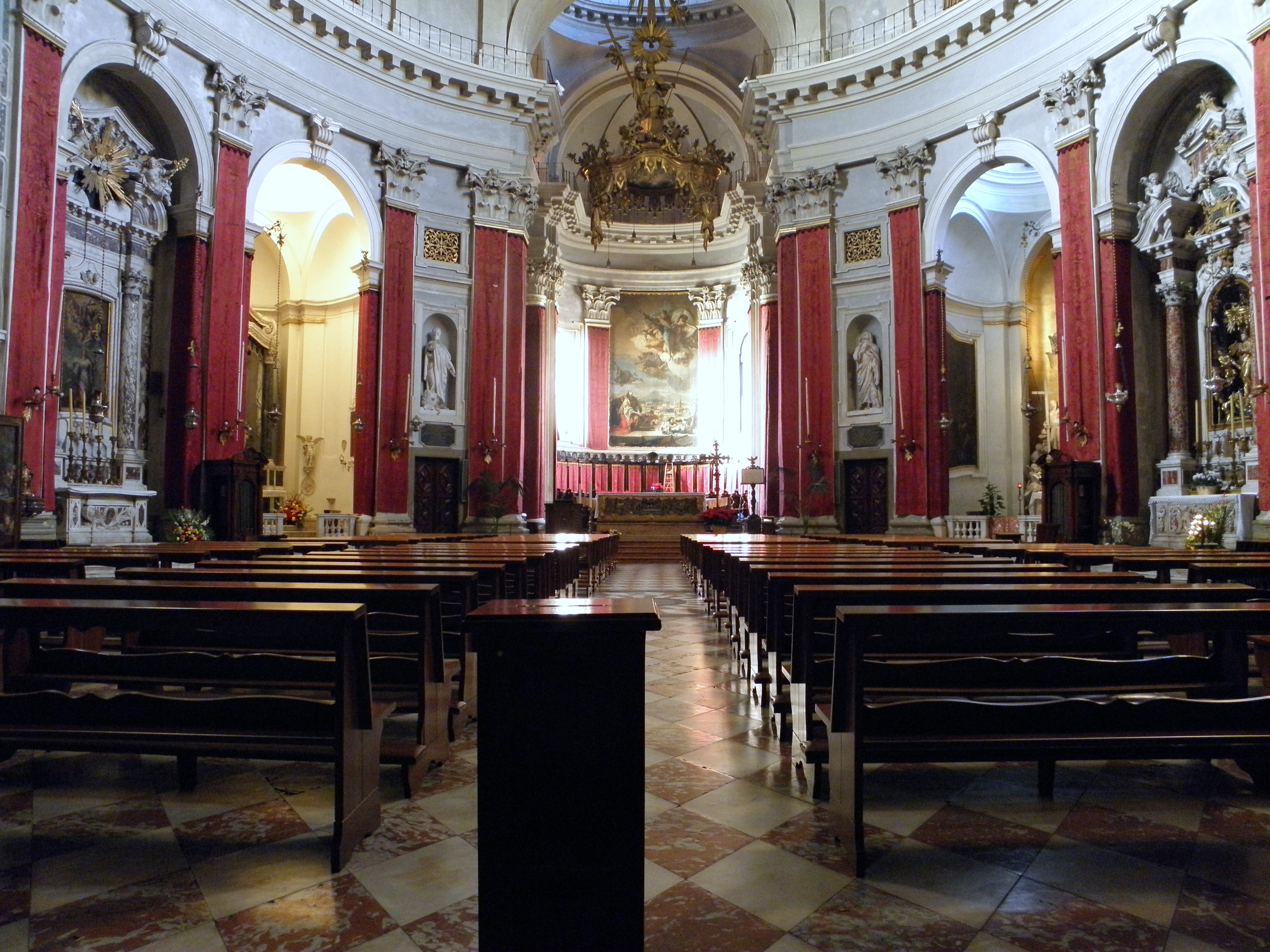
Interior facing apse

== History ==
A church at the site dates likely to the 4th or 5th centuries, when a church was erected upon the ruins of a former pagan temple, and dedicated to Saint Thecla, a virgin and martyr from Anatolia. The cathedral has been refurbished over the centuries. It was rebuilt in the 8th century till possessing five naves. The church was reconsecrated by Pope Leo IX in 1052. Until the 16th century, the layout continued to have the apse in the east. During a refurbishment during 1583 to 1592, designed by Vincenzo Scamozzi, the facade was re-oriented.

After an earthquake in 1688 damaged the church, and a complete reconstruction was promoted by the town archpriest Marco Marchetti, using designs for an elliptical nave with a tall cupola, by the Venetian architect Antonio Gaspari. Work begun in 1690 with the blessing of the bishop Gregorio Barbarigo, and was completed in 1720 with consecration by Cardinal Rezzonico, the future Pope Clement XIII. The facade was never completed, and remains in rough brick. The lower part of the bell-tower dates to the 8th century, but it was raised to its present height in 1724 by the architect Rossi.

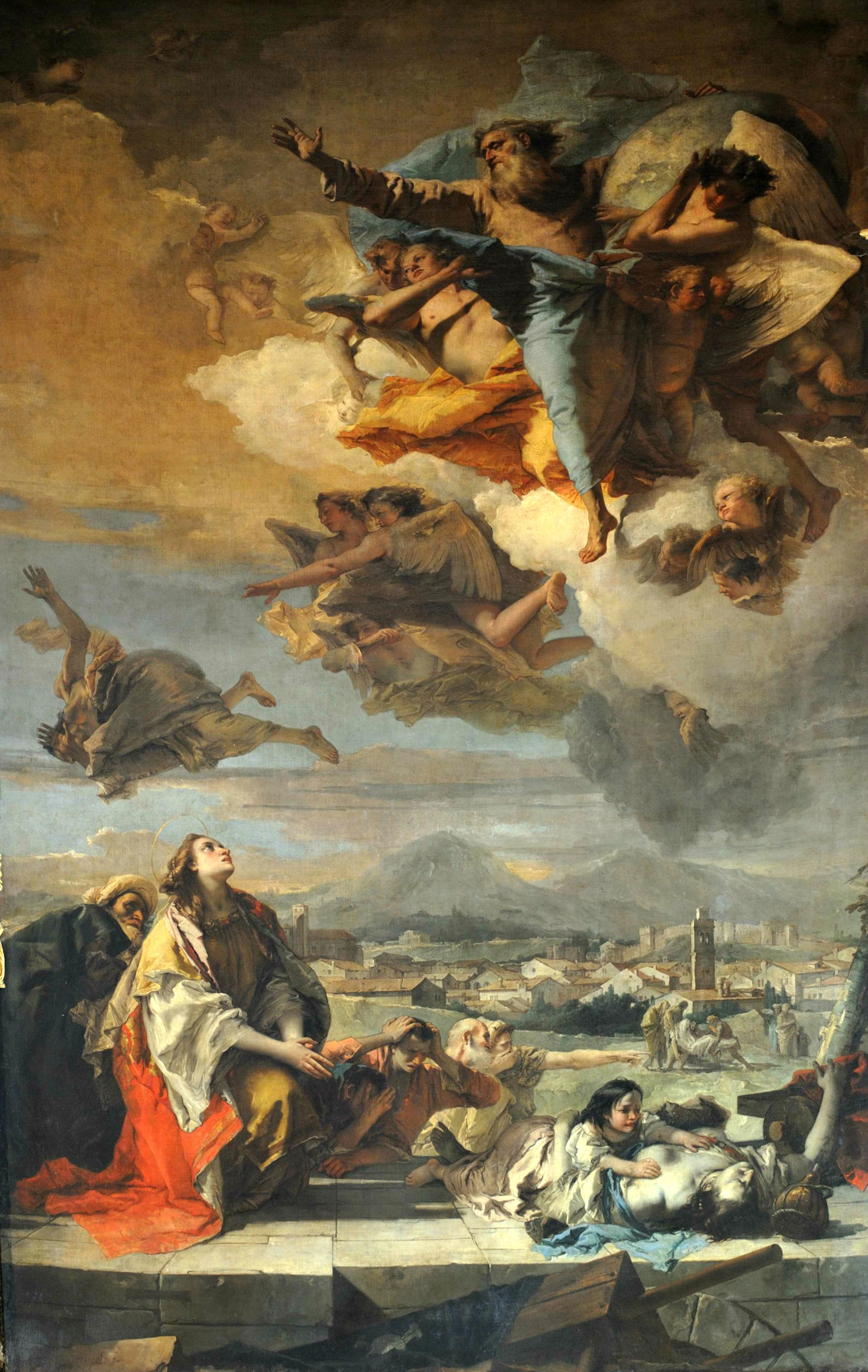
St Thecla Liberating the City of Este from the Plague, altarpiece (1758–59) by Tiepolo in the church of Santa Tecla

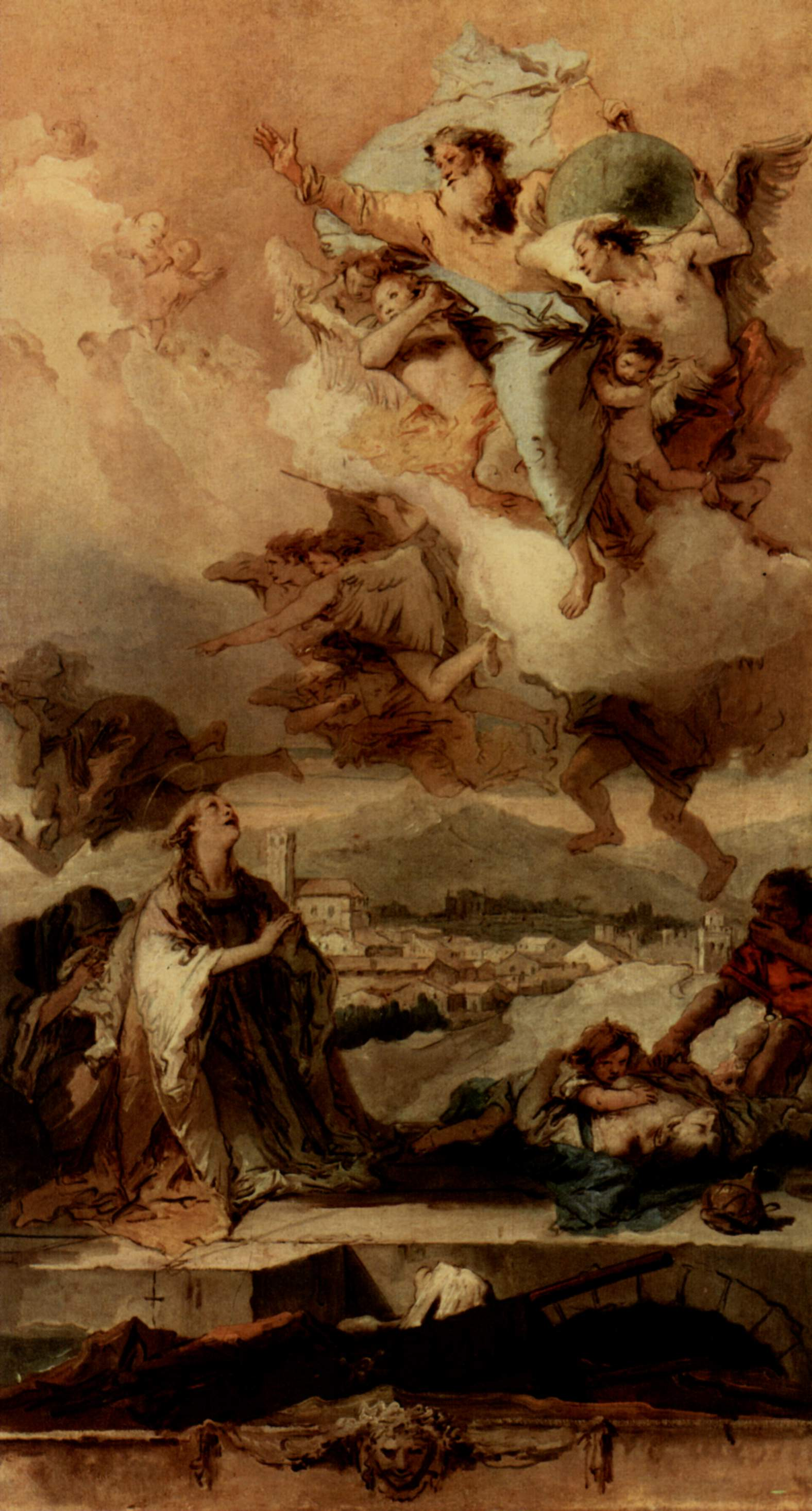
Oil sketch by Tiepolo, including a figure collecting corpses (Metropolitan Museum of Art)

The main altarpiece is a masterwork by Giovanni Battista Tiepolo, depicting Santa Tecla prays for the Liberation of Este from the Plague (1759). In the right of the presbytery, in the Chapel of the Holiest Sacrament, is a marble sculptural group depicting the Triumph of the Eucharist by Antonio Corradini, including a veiled female representing Faith. In the left chapel, is a 17th-century wooden crucifix by Francesco Terilli. The marble statues at the base, depicting Mary Magdalen hugging the cross with the Madonna upheld by Maria Salome, were sculpted about a century later by Bernardo Falconi. The nave ceiling has a depiction of the Martyrdom of Santa Tecla by Jacopo Amigoni.

In the second altar to the right of the entrance is a glass urn with the body of the blessed Beatrice I d'Este (1191-1226). Upon the altar, is a 19th-century canvas depicting the Virgin, St John the Baptist and the Blessed Beatrice d'Este, by Michelangelo Grigoletti.

Other paintings are housed in the Sacristy and in the Oratory of San Valentino, which is connected by a formal stairs and vestibule, and include a Madonna by Andrea del Sarto; Flagellation of Christ attributed to Durer; and other paintings by Giovanni Battista Zelotti, Antonio Zanchi, Luca da Reggio, and Tiepolo.
