= Paolo Zoppo =

Italian painter

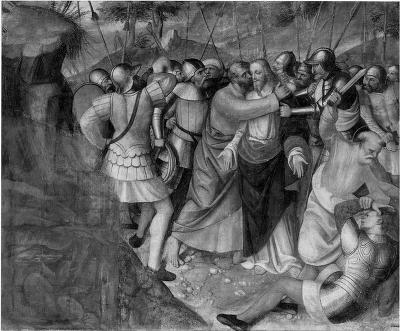
Judas Betraying Christ, c. 1505-1530, Fresco transferred to canvas

Paolo Zoppo (early 16th century) was an Italian painter of the Renaissance period, mainly active in Brescia.

He died suddenly in the town of Desenzano. He is known to have depicted in paint the sack of Brescia in 1512 by Gaston of Foix, Duke of Nemours.
