= Villa Widmann =

Building in Mira, Italy

Coordinates: 45°26′31″N 12°08′48″E

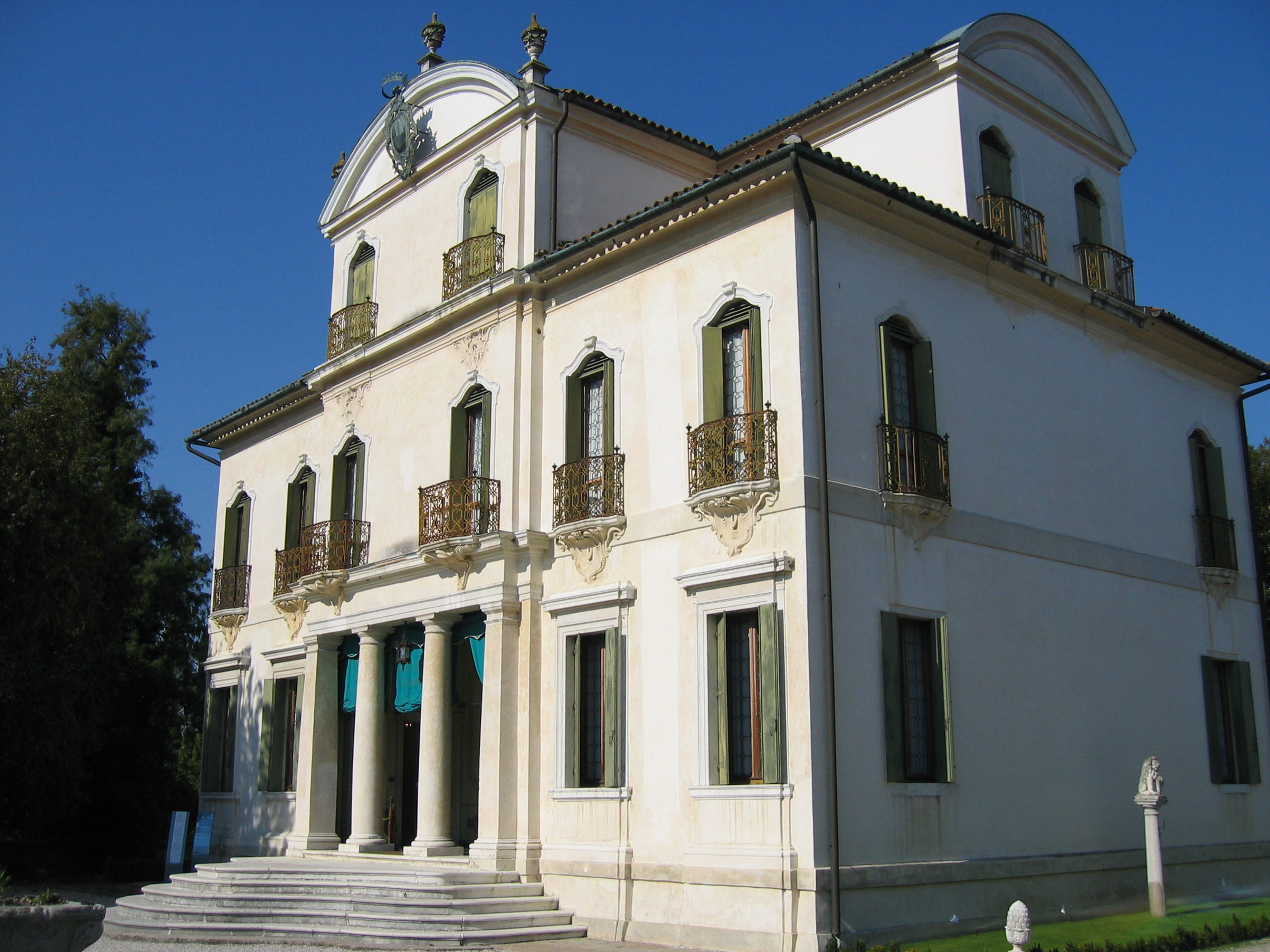

The Villa Widmann, also called Widmann-Rezzonico-Foscari, is a villa at the shores of the river Brenta located in the small town of Mira, between Venice and Padua.

The present palace was built in the 18th century. A succession of families including the Sceriman, Donà, Foscari, had previously owned the site. The present palace was apparently designed and built in 1719 by Alessandro (?...Andrea) Tirali, a Venetian architect. The Widmanns commissioned the internal frescoes mainly by Giuseppe Angeli, a pupil of Giambattista Piazzetta, and Gerolamo Mengozzi Colonna, who worked with Tiepolo. The Villa is surrounded by cypress and horse-chestnut trees, and gardens interspersed by several stone statues of gods, nymphs and cupids. A barchessa (a protruding arcade wing usually functioning as storage sheds or stables) and a small church, where Elisabetta and Arianna Widmann are buried, are also part of the Villa's buildings.

== Virtual tour ==
In 2011, it became the first of a series of digital heritage virtual tours that covers the most beautiful Venetian villas. The project was designed by Fotografia Virtuale™, a company specialized in high-tech photography and new media based in Venice with several branches in major Italian cities.

== See also ==
- Palladian villas of the Veneto
- Riviera del Brenta

== Sources ==
Fotografia Virtuale ™

- province of Venezia.
