= Giorgio Massari =

Italian architect (1687–1766)

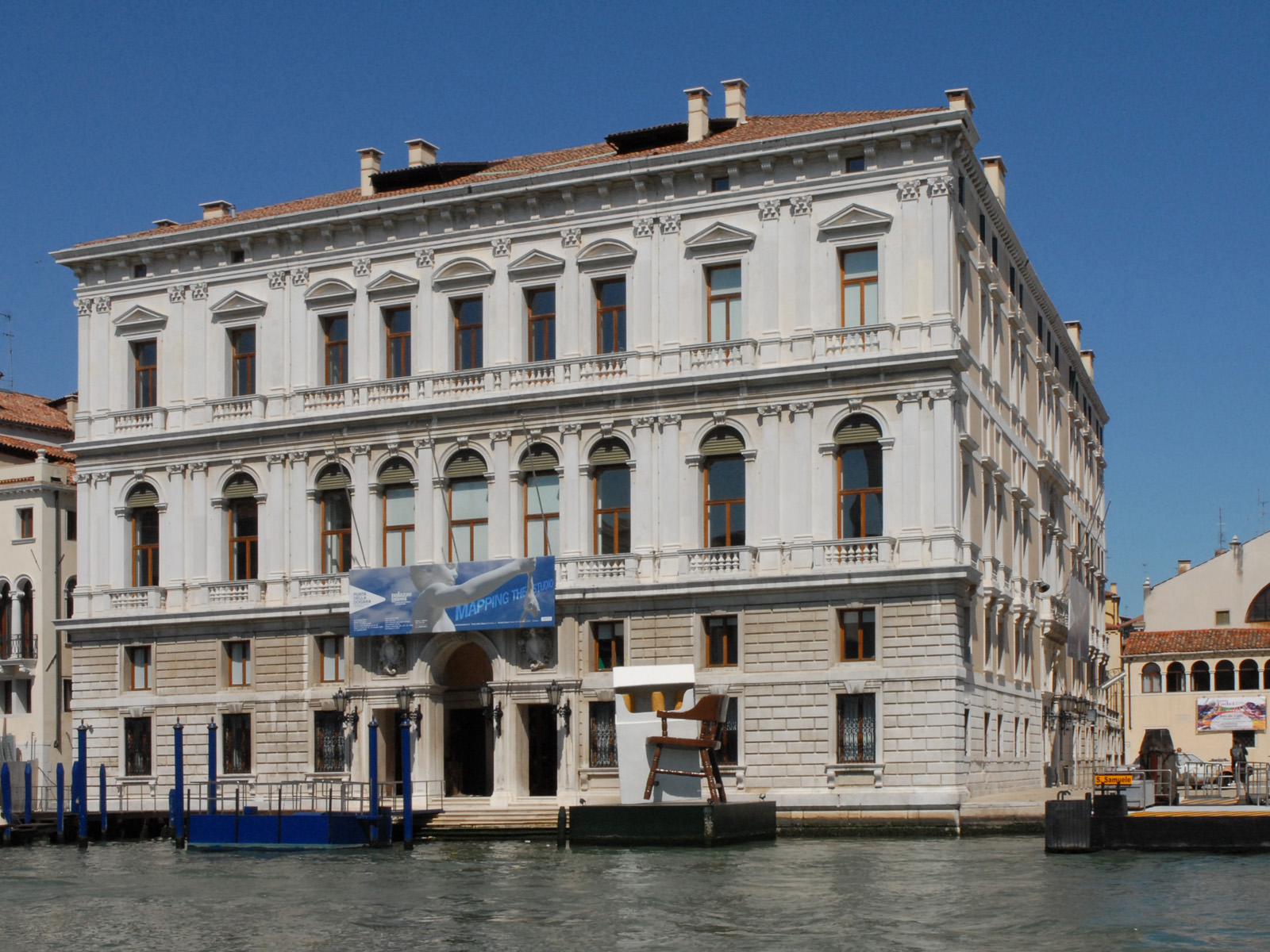
- Palazzo Grassi
- Born: 13 October 1687; Venice, Republic of Venice
- Died: 20 December 1766 (aged 79); Venice, Republic of Venice
- Occupation: Architect
- Movement: Late-Baroque; Neoclassicism
- Buildings: Chiesa dei Gesuati; Palazzo Grassi

Giorgio Massari (13 October 1687 – 20 December 1766) was an Italian late-Baroque architect from Venice. In Venice, he often worked closely with Tiepolo in planning interior decoration of palaces. Among his masterpieces are the Chiesa dei Gesuati (1726–43) located in Dorsoduro, Venice and the Palazzo Grassi (1749).

== Biography ==
Giorgio Massari was born in Venice on 13 October 1687. His father, Stefano Massari, was a joiner or carpenter, and Massari’s first patron was a friend of the family, Paolo Tamagnini, a rich Venetian merchant who commissioned him to build a villa (1712) at Istrana in the region of Treviso. The influence of Palladio, which characterized Massari’s work, was already apparent in this early building, particularly in the triple Palladian window in the central section. Massari went on to produce a large number of works for a variety of patrons, especially ecclesiastical ones, and he became one of the most important Venetian architects of the first half of the 18th century.

Most of his buildings were executed in the Veneto region, but an early exception was the church of Santa Maria della Pace (1719), Brescia, for the Philippine Fathers. Built in two storeys, it has a five-bay façade with four large columns, and it served throughout the 18th century as a model for church architecture in the Veneto. Massari’s best-known church is Santa Maria del Rosario (1725–36), the church of the Gesuati, built on the Giudecca canal, Venice, to a rectangular plan with cut-off corners. Its pedimented façade, with four giant engaged Corinthian columns and a minor order for the portal, has many Palladian echoes, although the clustered pilasters at the angles exhibit an undulating Rococo quality. The aisleless nave has three interconnected chapels on each side, articulated with a triumphal arch motif, while the choir features free-standing columns as in Palladio’s Il Redentore. Rococo effects are particularly notable in the ceiling treatment at the Gesuati, particularly in the frames surrounding Giambattista Tiepolo’s fresco decorations (1739). Lighting is exclusively from clerestory windows, leaving the chapels in shadow.

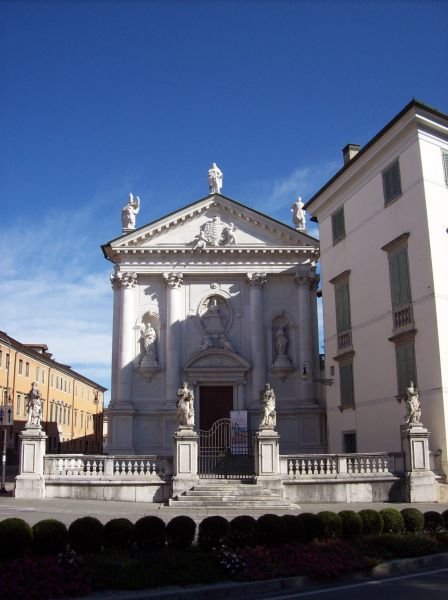
Church of Sant'Antonio, Udine (1731–2)

From 1727, Massari was also involved in the church and hospital of the Catecumeni and the Scuola di San Giovanni Evangelista, Venice, where he raised the ceiling of the Gran Salone and introduced Rococo decoration. The church of Sant'Antonio (1731–2), Udine, however, is one of his most purely Neoclassical works; like that of the Gesuati, the façade has four Corinthian columns on high pedestals supporting an entablature and pediment.

In 1735, Massari won a competition for the design of the new church and hospital of Santa Maria della Pietà, Venice. The hospital was never built, although the drawings survive (Venice, Correr), but work on the church continued from 1745 to 1760. The church is a simplified version of the Gesuati, planned as an aisleless rectangle with curved corners, against which the four chapels are set. The nave was used as a concert auditorium, and a vestibule was provided at the front to insulate against noise from the street.

Massari produced numerous villas, including the Villa Cordellina (1735), Montecchio Maggiore, Vicenza, the elevation of which echoed the central block of Palladio’s Villa Badoer, Fratta Polesine; the service blocks, however, were grouped as free-standing units around their own courts instead of being linked to the house in the manner of Palladio’s barchesse.

Massari’s most important secular work is the Palazzo Grassi (1748), on the Grand Canal, Venice, which has a traditional Venetian façade made more restrained by the use of pilasters instead of columns. The internal courtyard, however, is surrounded by Tuscan columns supporting a straight entablature, with a first-floor arcade on narrow coupled pilasters. Massari also completed the Ca' Rezzonico (formerly the Palazzo Bon), opposite the Palazzo Grassi, begun in 1649 by Baldassare Longhena, who completed only the ground floor. Massari continued the work from 1748, adding a second atrium at the far end of the courtyard, with a grand staircase beyond; the second storey added by Massari is probably based on Longhena’s design, but the attic storey, with oval windows, reveals Massari’s own hand.

Among many smaller works, Massari can also be credited with the design of Sant'Eufemia, Brescia, built in the last years of Venetian rule. This building was formerly attributed to Abbot Pietro Faita, the patron and administrator of the project, but, according to a document by the Abbot, recently discovered, a scheme by Massari was accepted after Massari had rejected three designs submitted to him for judgment.

Massari also designed the scenographic staircase entry to Villa Giovanelli, Noventa Padovana. He died in Venice on 20 December 1766. Some of Massari's designs were completed by his pupil Bernardino Maccarucci.

=== Legacy ===
Massari’s work has been variously described as ‘Baroque’, ‘Rococo’ and ‘Neoclassicist’, but a comprehensive study of his oeuvre shows that it reflects all three characteristics. He can best be characterized as an heir to the Venetian classicist tradition that began with Palladio, continued with Longhena and ended by interpreting in a particularly Venetian manner the first stimuli of the Enlightenment.

== Gallery ==
Works in Venice by Giorgio Massari

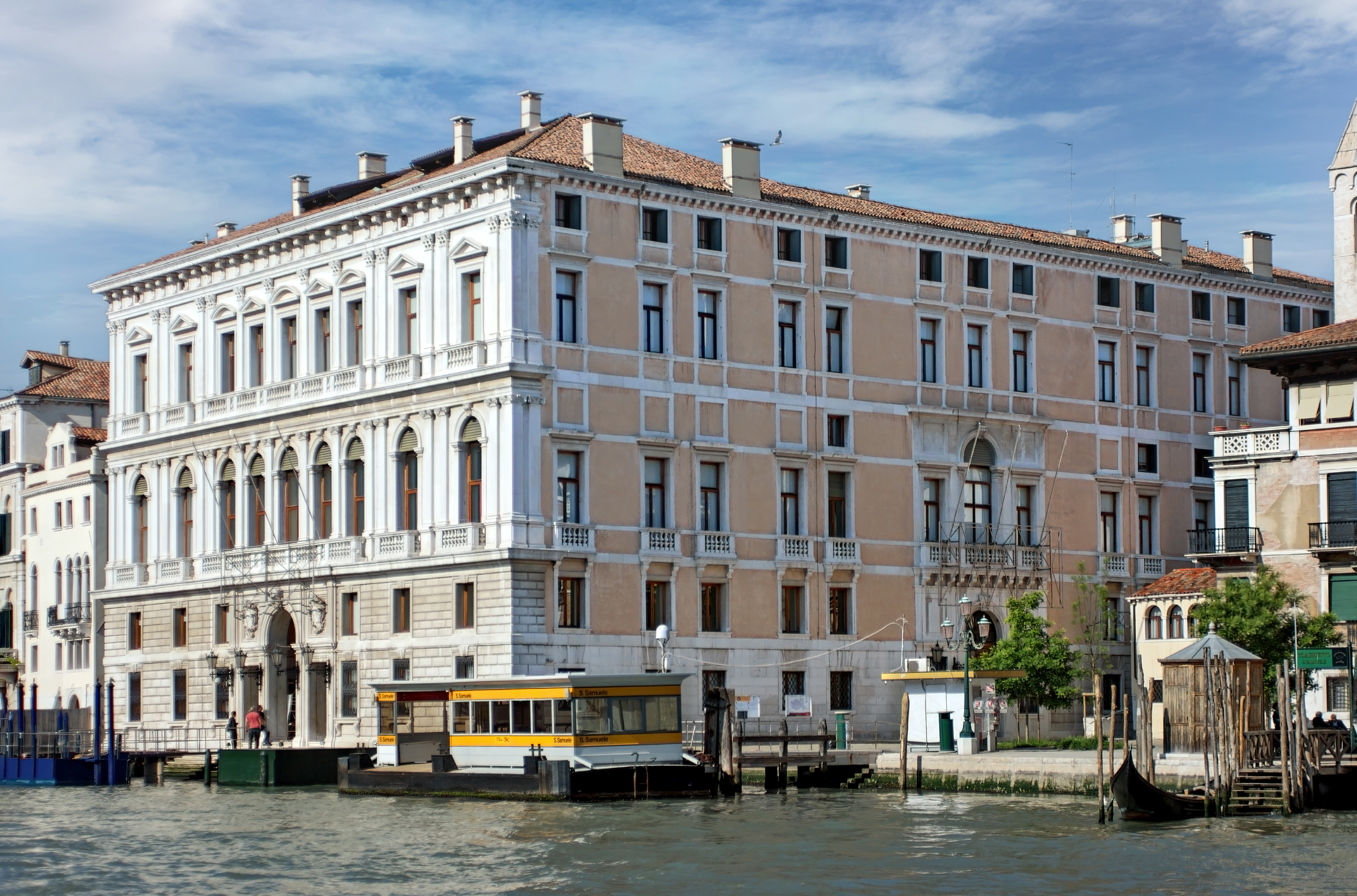
Palazzo Grassi

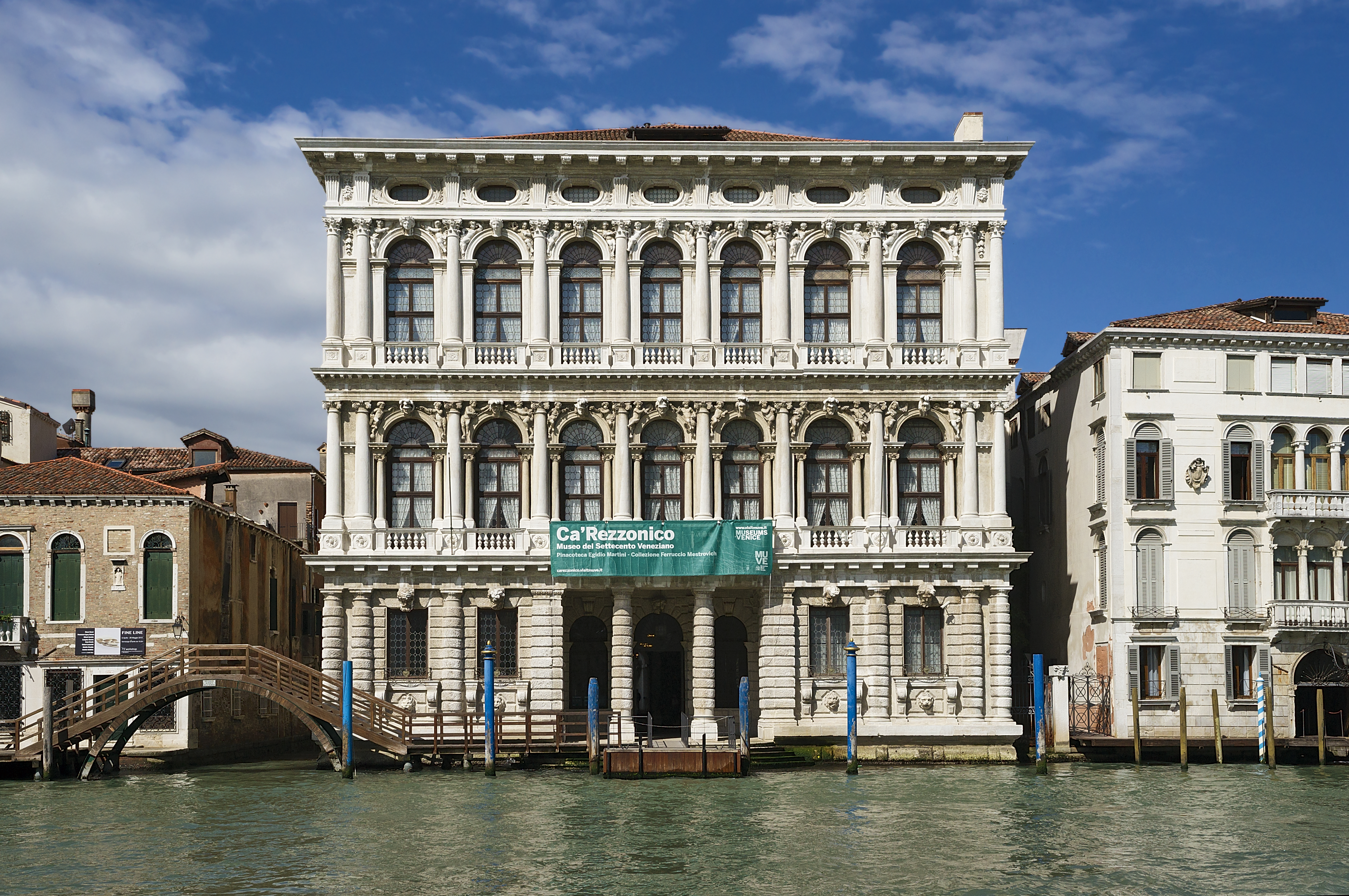
Ca' Rezzonico

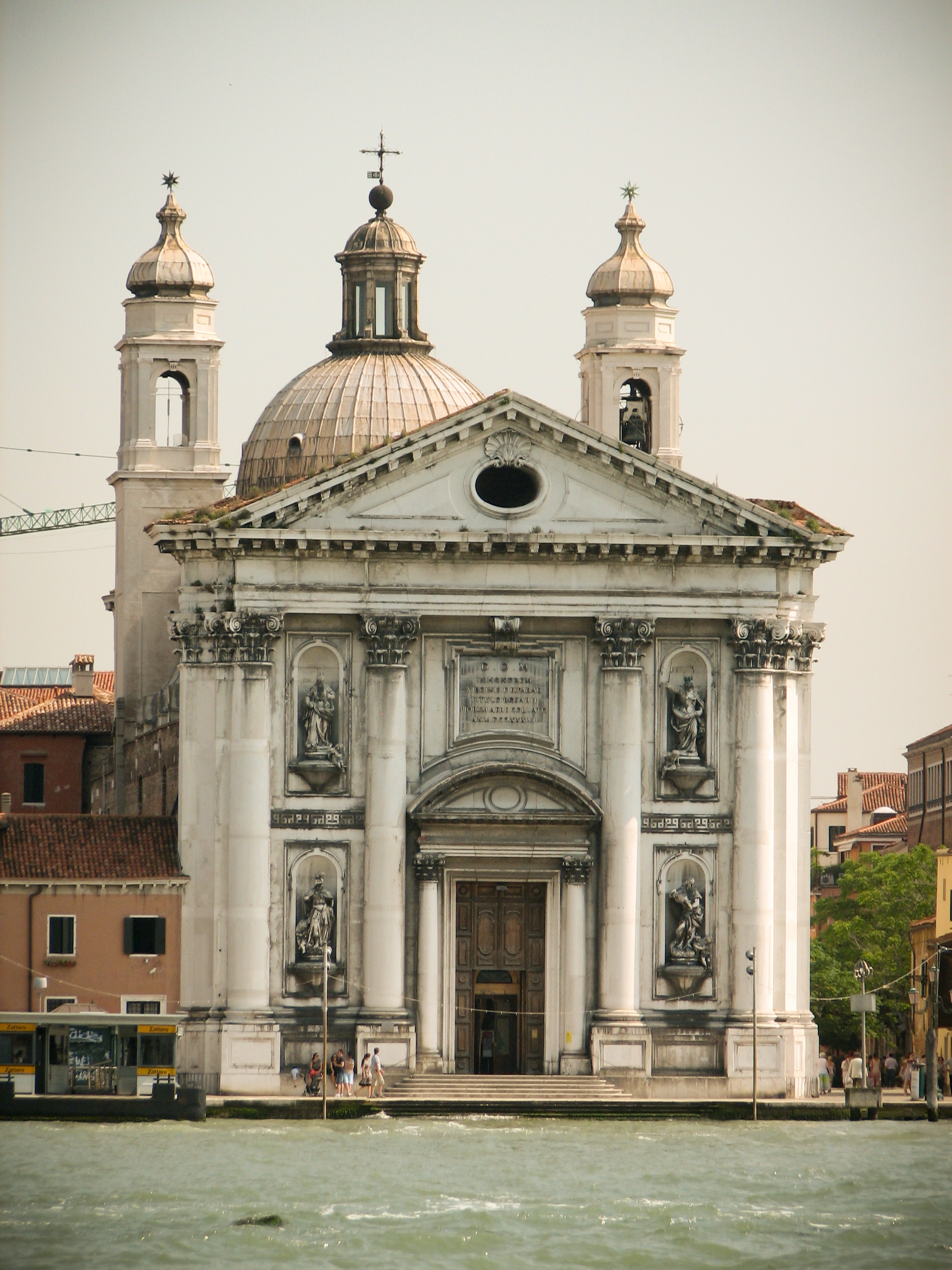
Church of the Gesuati

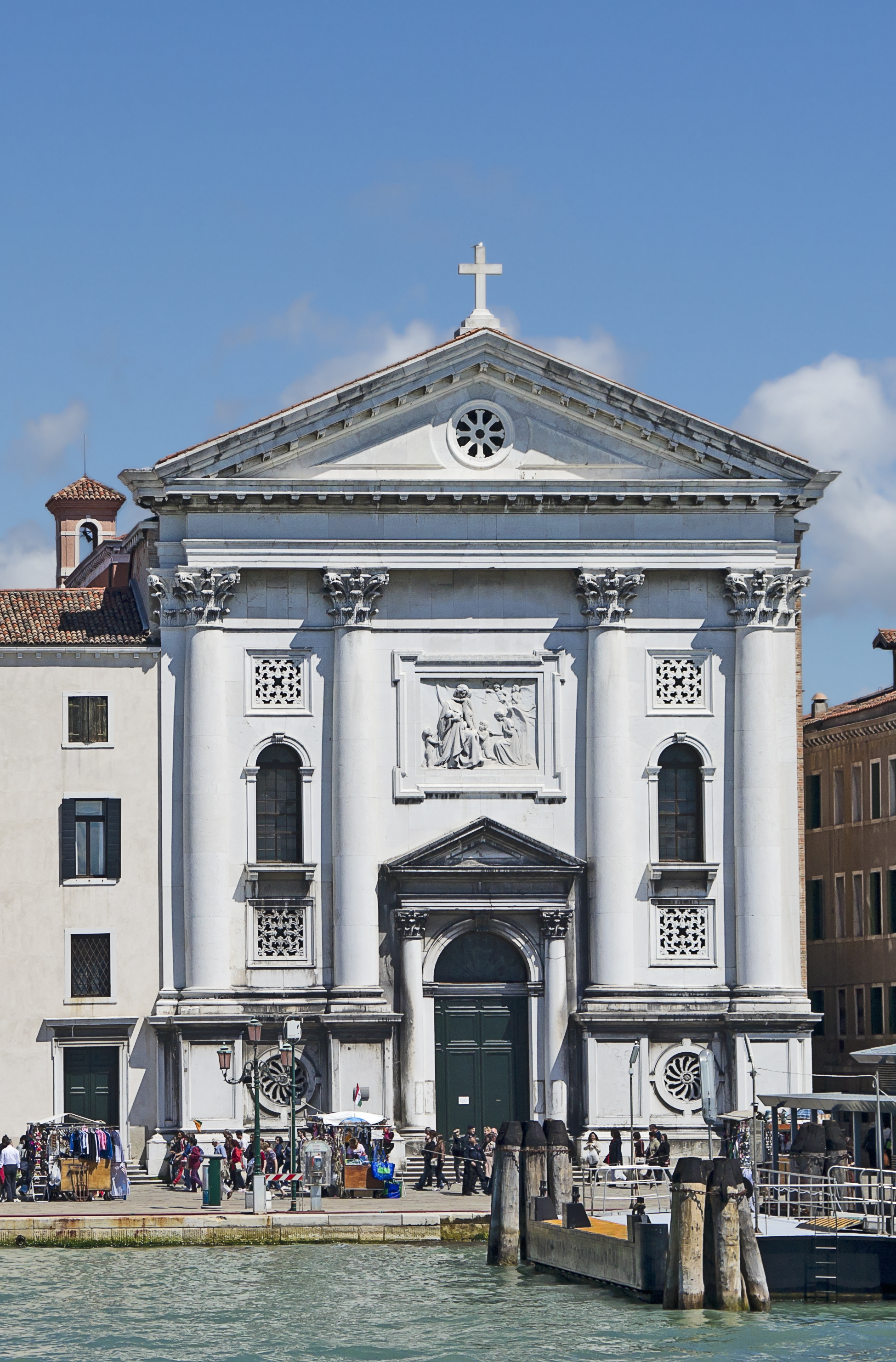
Church of the Pietà

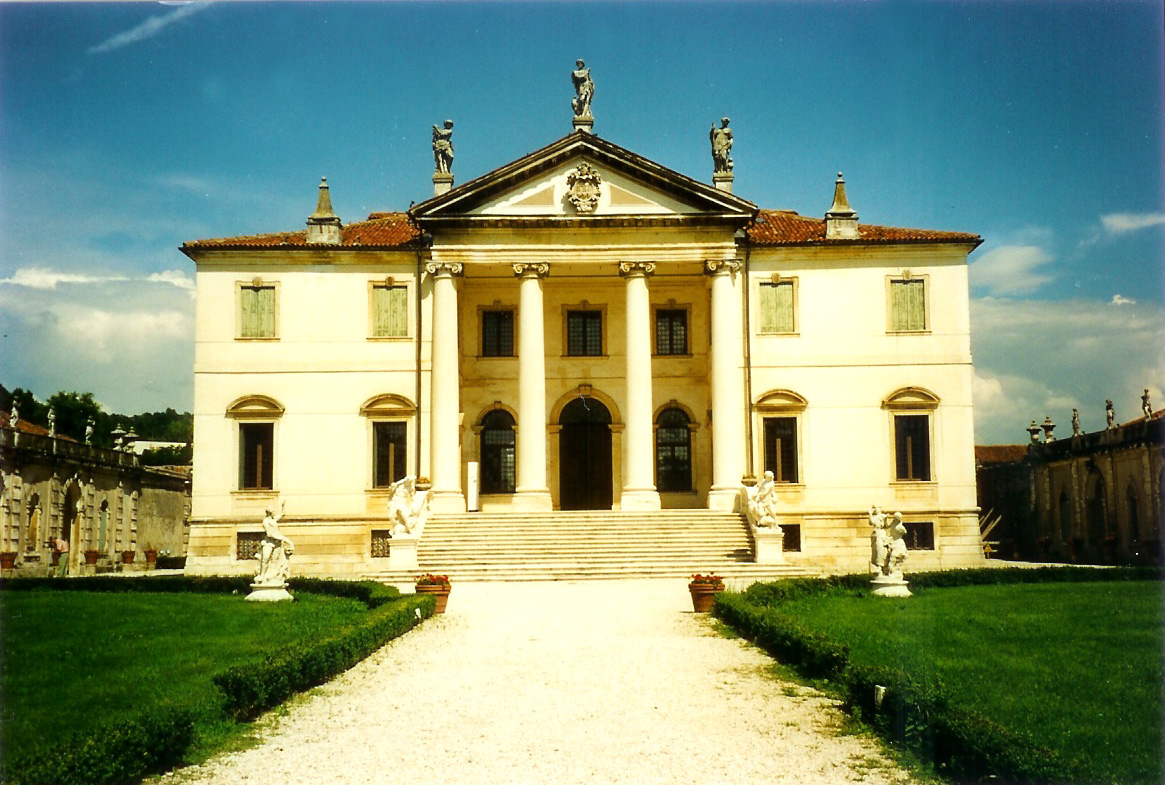
Massari's Villa Cordellina Lombardi, built for Carlo Cordellina, Montecchio Maggiore, c 1735-60
