= Sebouh David Aslanian =

Armenian-American historian

Sebouh David Aslanian is a historian of the early modern world and Armenian history. He is Professor & Richard Hovannisian Endowed Chair in Modern Armenian History at UCLA.

Born in Ethiopia to Armenian parents whose ancestors fled the Ottoman Empire during the Hamidian massacres in the 1890s, Aslanian grew up in Dubai. His maternal grandfather, Georges Djerrahian, opened Ethiopia's first commercial printing press in 1931. He obtained BA from McGill University, MA from New School for Social Research and a Ph.D. with Distinction from Columbia University.

== Publications ==
- From the Indian Ocean to the Mediterranean: The Global Trade Networks of Armenian Merchants from New Julfa (2011, University of California Press)
- Early Modernity and Mobility: Port Cities and Printers across the Armenian Diaspora, 1512-1800 (2023, Yale University Press) — winner of the Society for the History of Authorship, Reading and Publishing Book History Book Prize
