= Antonio Gaspari =

Italian architect

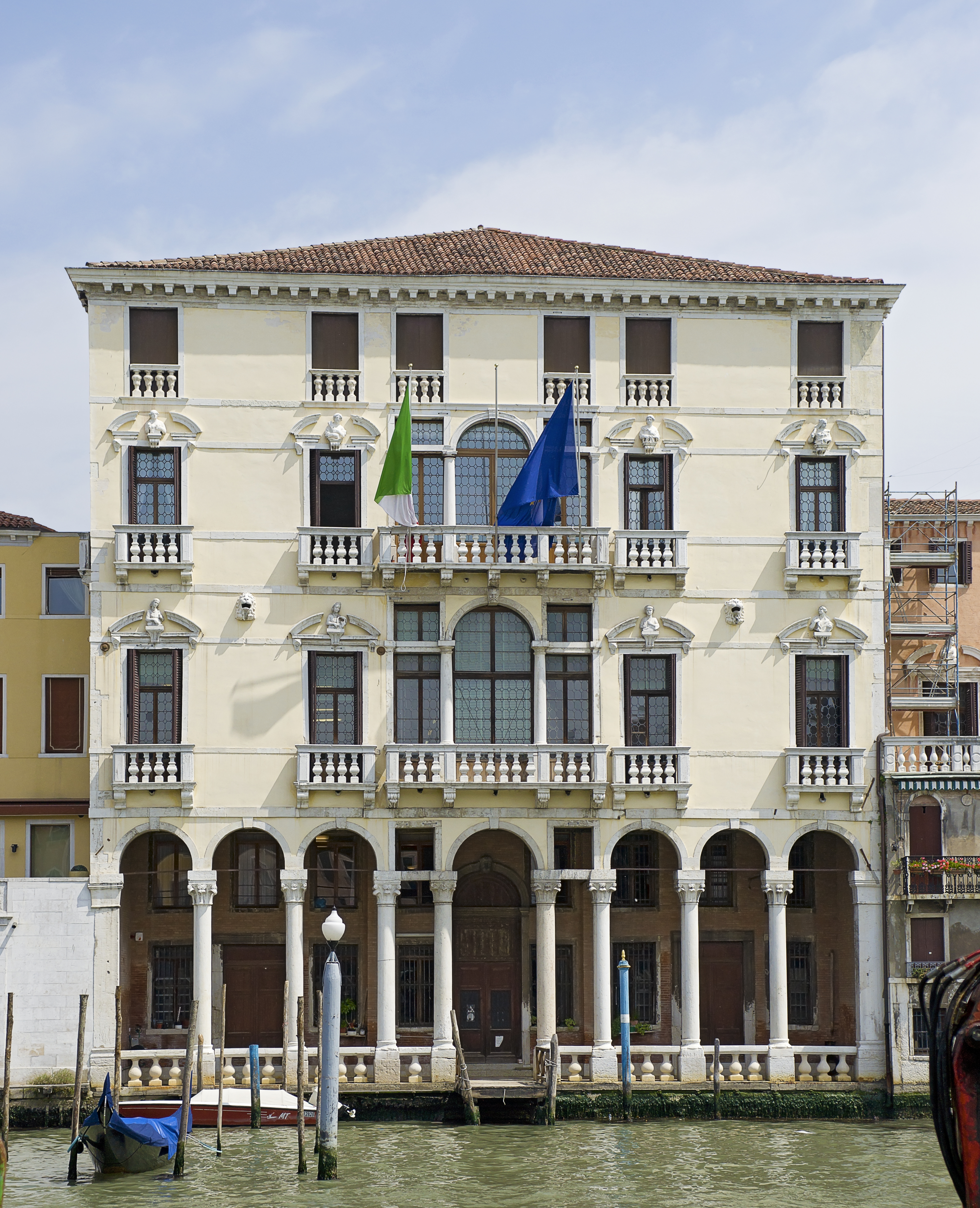
- Palazzo Michiel dalle Colonne, Venice
- Born: Antonio Domenico Gaspari; 10 April 1656; Venice, Republic of Venice
- Died: 23 April 1723 (aged 67); Venice, Republic of Venice
- Burial place: Santa Fosca, Venice
- Occupation: Architect
- Movement: Baroque

Antonio Gaspari (10 April 1656 – 23 April 1723) was an Italian architect of the late-Baroque, active in both Venice and the terraferma of the Veneto.

== Biography ==
Antonio Gaspari was born in Contrada Santa Fosca, Venice, the fifth of eleven children. His father, Giacomo, came from Colle Santa Lucia in the Dolomites and moved to Venice in 1631, when he was fourteen years old. Like many others, he migrated from the Terraferma to capital, helping to replenish a population that had been decimated by the plague. Like his uncle, who was already living in Venice, Antonio’s father worked as a baker. Antonio’s mother, Cipriana Radose, who came from Mogliano, had moved to Venice during the plague epidemic that ravaged northern Italy between 1629 and 1631. His brother Giovanni, eight years his senior, studied theology and went on to become a canon of San Marco and Vicar General of the Patriarchate of Venice.

Due to a lack of documentation, it is difficult to ascertain the nature of his training. He was a pupil of Baldassarre Longhena, and upon his master's death in 1682, he completed some of his projects, including Longhena's most famous work, the imposing church of Santa Maria della Salute. It is also likely that he attended the Accademia di San Luca in Rome in the late 1670s, as he collaborated closely with the painter Ludovico Dorigny, who attended the Academy in the same period and worked with Gaspari on several projects in Venice, including Ca' Zenobio degli Armeni and Ca' Tron.

Throughout his life, he was renowned for his attempts to blend the styles of Gian Lorenzo Bernini and Francesco Borromini. His first documented work as an architect was the project to rebuild the Cathedral of Santa Tecla, Este, which he undertook in the late 1680s. The three-aisled Romanesque basilica had to be demolished following the 1688 earthquake, and it was rebuilt based on Gaspari's designs as a centrally planned structure with an oval layout. It was consecrated in 1690. Even at this early stage, Gaspari continued the stylistic renewal of architecture that had been initiated by Baldassare Longhena.

In 1683, he married Elisabetta Rapuzzo. However, she passed away in 1687 after a brief illness, just months after the death of their third child. Gaspari did not remarry and was left to raise his two surviving children alone. He died on 23 April 1723, aged 67, in a modest house in Contrada San Marcuola, Venice, and was buried in his family tomb in Santa Fosca. One of his sons, Giovanni Paolo Gaspari (1712-1775), was a painter active mainly in Germany.

== Works ==
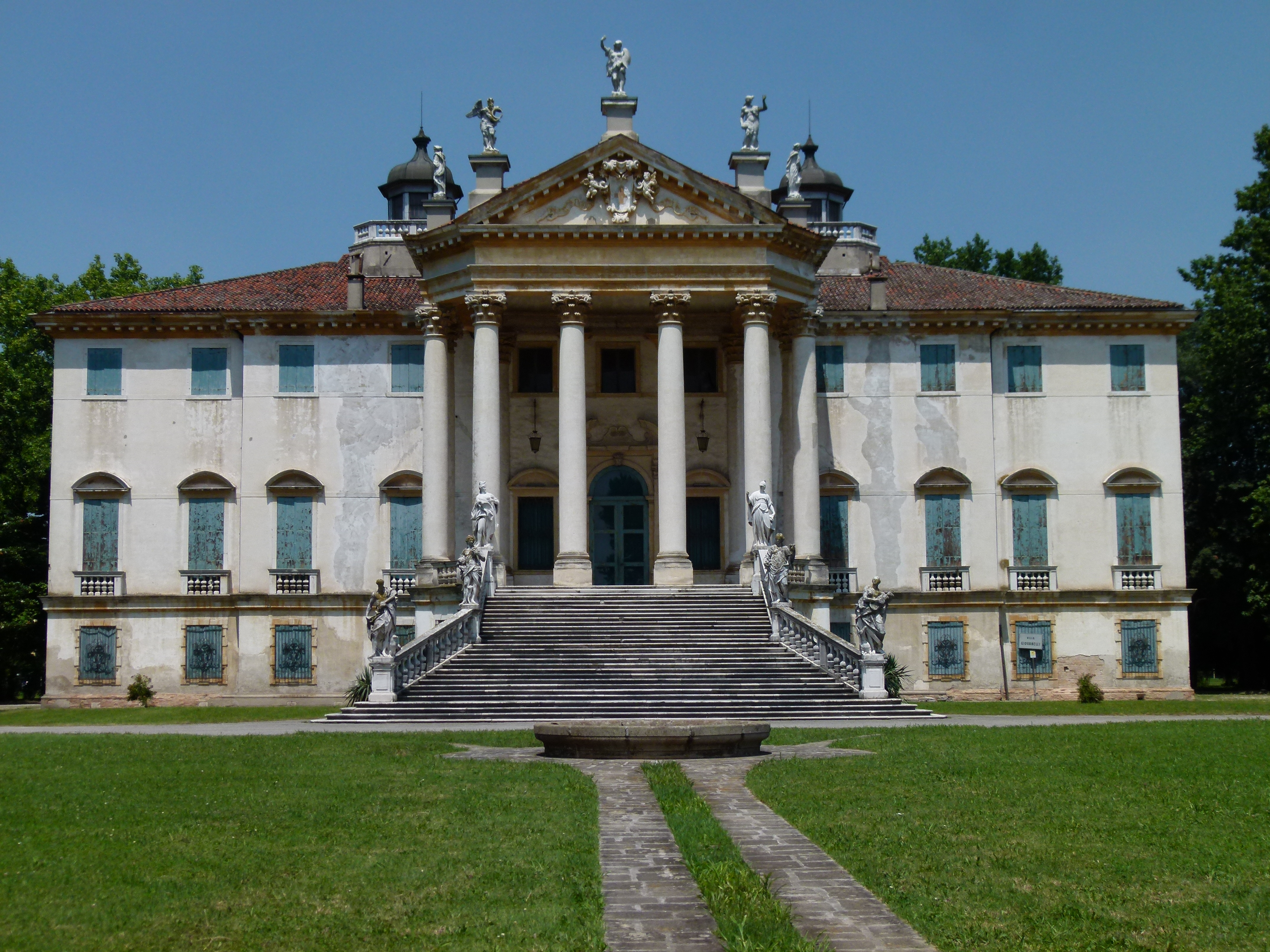
Villa Giovanelli Colonna, Noventa Padovana

- Santa Maria della Fava, Venice
- Ca' Zenobio degli Armeni, Venice
- Santa Sofia, Venice (reconstruction)
- San Marcuola, Venice (posthumous, left incomplete)
- Palazzo Barbaro a San Vidal, Venice (enlargement)
- Palazzo Michiel dalle Colonne, Venice (restoration)
- Villa Giovanelli Colonna, Noventa Padovana
- Duomo Abbaziale di Santa Tecla in Este
- Palazzo Capitanale, Lavis (enlargement)

== Bibliography ==
- Bassi, Elena (1963). "Episodi dell'architettura veneta nell'opera di Antonio Gaspari". Saggi e Memorie di Storia dell'Arte. 3: 55, 57–108, 171–188. JSTOR 43139928.
- Cogo, Bruno (2003). Antonio Gaspari architetto veneziano. Dati biografici (1656-1723). Il suo capolavoro. Este: Grafica Atestina.
