= Antonio Gai =

Italian sculptor

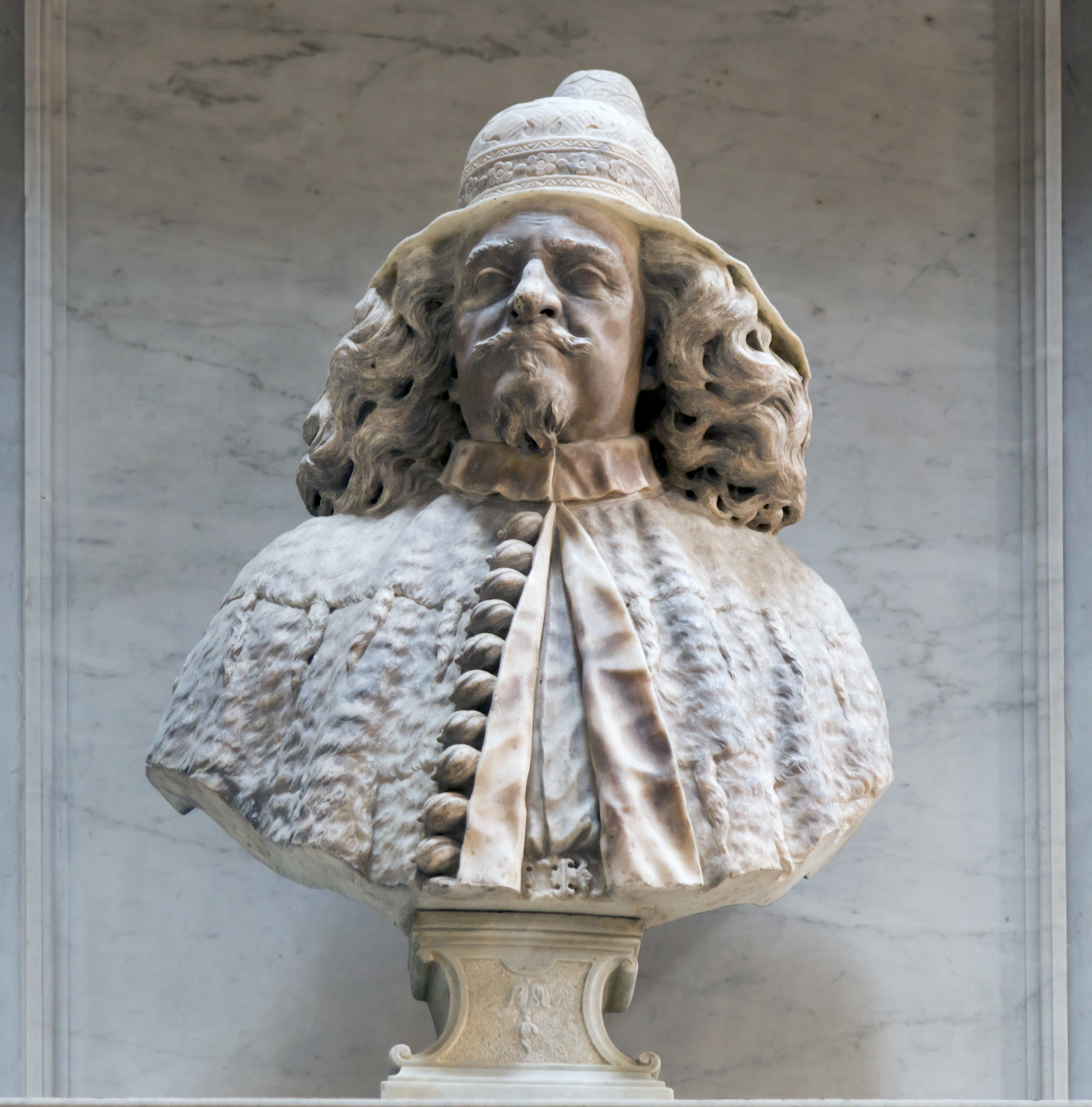
Doge Nicolo Sagredo from his monument at San Francesco della Vigna, Venice

Antonio Gai (Born 3 May 1686 – 4 June 1769) was an Italian sculptor, active in his native Venice and Veneto during the late-Baroque period.

== Biography ==
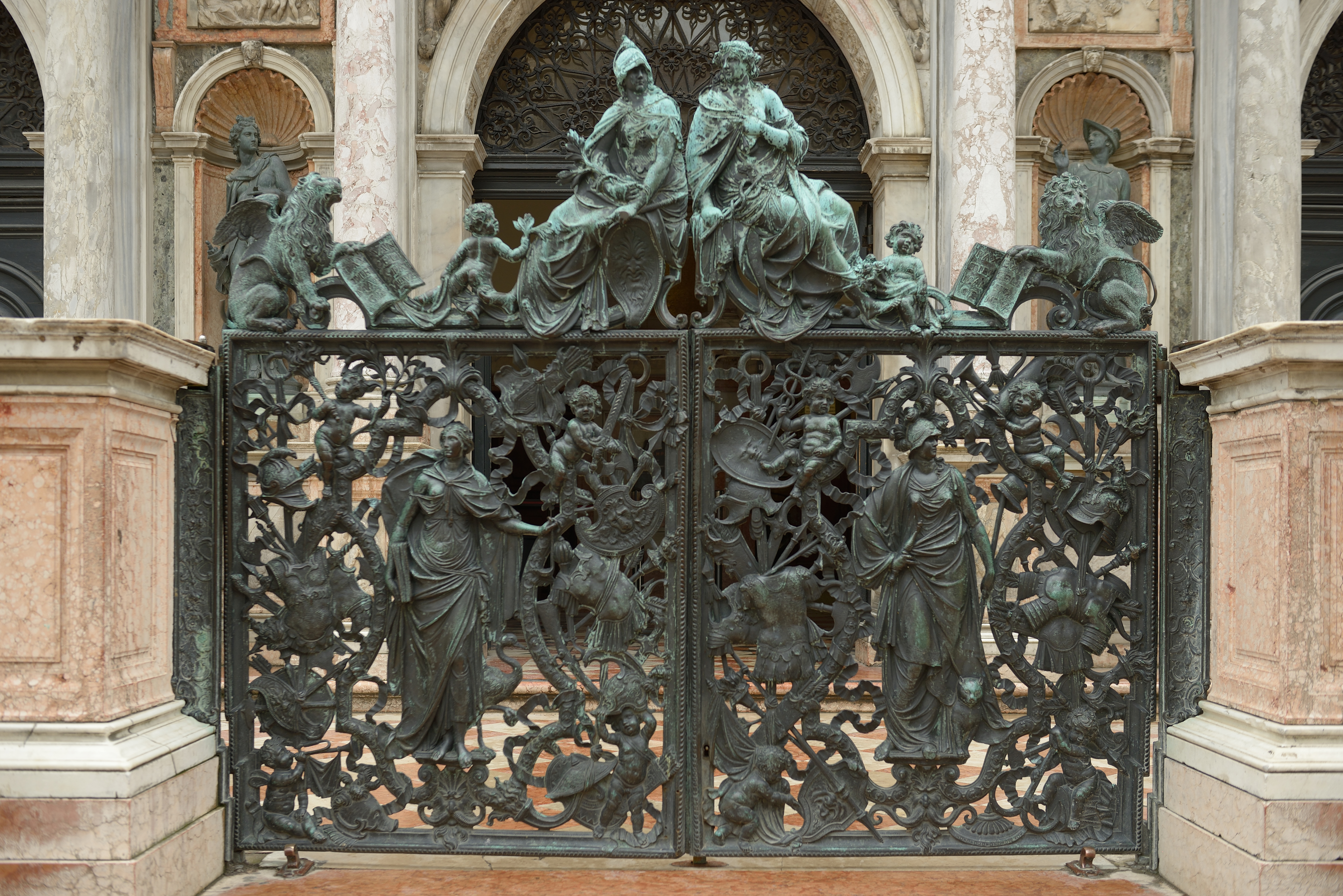
Bronze gates of the Loggietta in Piazza San Marco

He learned his trade from a wood sculptor and his father, Francesco, also a sculptor.

He completed the statues of allegories of Faith and Fortitude for the church of San Vidal in Venice. In 1733, Antonio was commissioned to make the bronze gates of the loggietta of Sansovino's campanile in the Piazza of San Marco, Venice. He made also two monuments (1743) in the chapel of the Sagredo family, a statue of Alvise Sagredo and the Tomb of Doge Nicolo Sagredo in the church of San Francesco della Vigna. He was one of the founding members of the Academy of Fine Arts of Venice.
