= Noventa Padovana =

- Comune
- Comune di Noventa Padovana
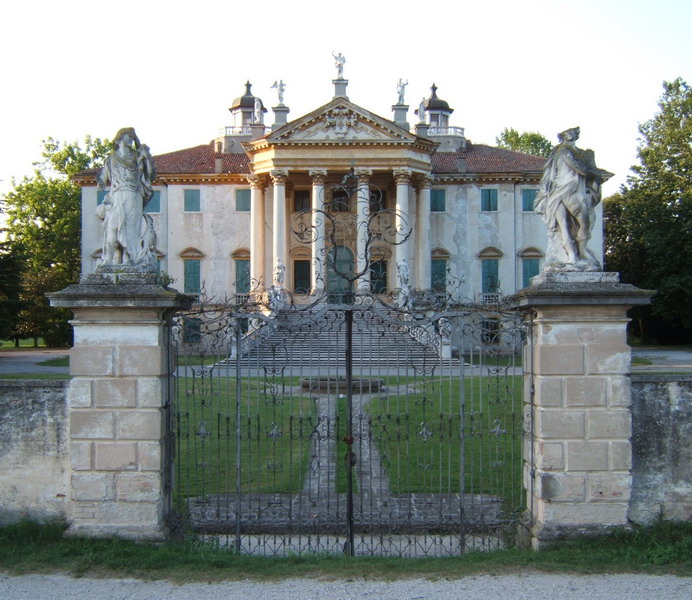
- Villa Giovannelli Colonna.

- Coat of arms

- Location within Italy Location within Veneto
- Coordinates: 45°25′N 11°57′E
- Country: Italy
- Region: Veneto
- Province: Padua (PD)
- Frazioni: Noventana, Oltrebrenta

Government
  - Mayor: Marcello Bano (Lega)

Area
  - Total: 7.17 km^{2} (2.77 sq mi)
- Elevation: 13 m (43 ft)

Population (28 February 2011)
  - Total: 10,941
  - Density: 1,530/km^{2} (3,950/sq mi)
- Demonym: Noventani
- Time zone: UTC+1 (CET)
  - Summer (DST): UTC+2 (CEST)
- Postal code: 35027
- Dialing code: 049
- Patron saint: St. Peter and St. Paul Apostles
- Saint day: June 29
- Website: Official website

Noventa Padovana is a comune (municipality) in the Province of Padua in the Italian region Veneto, located about 30 kilometres (19 mi) west of Venice and about 7 kilometres (4 mi) east of Padua.

In the 13th century, the castle of Noventa Padovana was the residence of Isabella of England, the wife of emperor Frederick II.

Noventa's territory is characterized by numerous patrician villas from the 16th to 18th centuries, such as

- Villa Valmarana
- Villa Giustiniani
- Villa Saccomani
- Villa Todeschini
- Villa Manzoni
- Villa Giovannelli Colonna

== Twin towns ==
Noventa Padovana is twinned with:

- Municipality of Šoštanj, Slovenia, since 1984
- Umag, Croatia, since 1984
