= Tomb of Leonardo Loredan =

Monumental 16th-century burial site

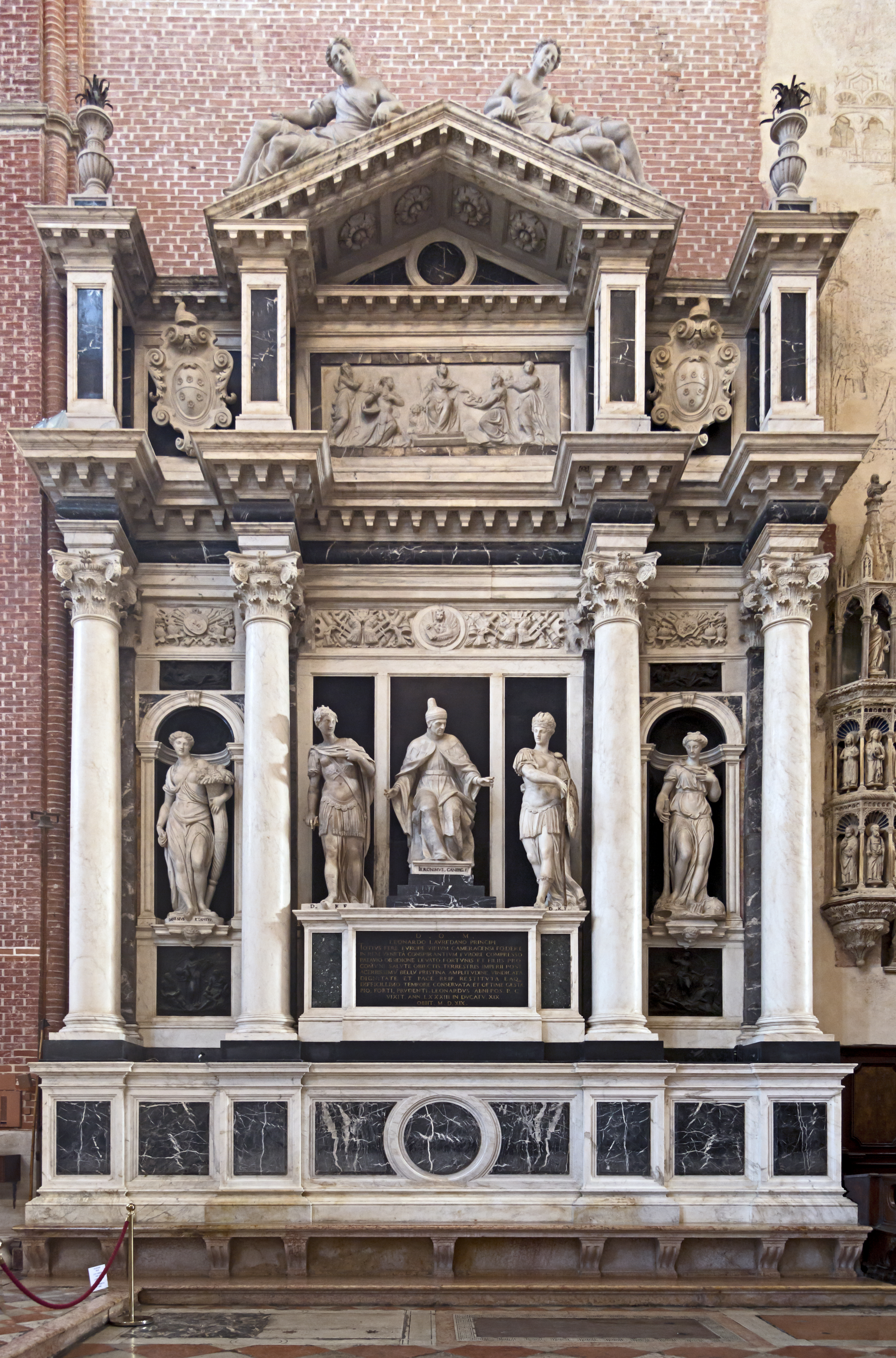

General information
- Type: Tomb
- Location: Basilica of Saints John and Paul
- Address: Campo S.S. Giovanni e Paolo, Castello 6363
- Town or city: Venice
- Country: Italy
- Completed: 1572
- Affiliation: House of Loredan

Technical details
- Material: Carrara marble

Design and construction
- Architect(s): Girolamo Grappiglia
- Other designers: Girolamo Campagna, Danese Cattaneo

The tomb of Leonardo Loredan is a monumental 16th-century burial site located in the Basilica of Saints John and Paul in Venice, Italy. Interred in it are Leonardo Loredan (1436 - 1521), 75th Doge of Venice, and his descendant Francesco Loredan (1685 - 1762), 116th Doge of Venice, both members of the Santo Stefano branch of the House of Loredan.

Doge Leonardo Loredan died in Venice on 22 June 1521. The death, which occurred between eight and nine, was kept secret until sixteen at the behest of the children who, during their father's agony, had no regard for transporting furniture and objects from the doge's apartment to their residence. As is customary, the body was subjected to embalming practices. On the morning of June 23, after the body was moved to the Piovego room of the Doge's Palace, the coffin was closed. At the solemn funeral the eulogy was read by the scholar Andrea Navagero, and Pietro Bembo, then abbot and secretary of Pope Leo X, was also present.

Loredan died "with great fame as a prince". He was interred in the Basilica of Santi Giovanni e Paolo, in a simple tomb with a celestial marble headstone without inscription, placed above the steps of the main altar and now no longer existing. In about 1572, and after some disputes between the Loredan heirs and the friars of the church, a funeral monument was erected for him, divided into three parts and adorned with Corinthian columns in Carrara marble, placed to the left of the main altar, with architecture by Girolamo Grappiglia, and adorned with an extremely lifelike statue, an early work by the sculptor Girolamo Campagna, which depicts him in the act of "getting up and boldly throwing himself in defence of Venice against Europe conspired in Cambrai". On its right was the statue of Venice with sword in hand and on the left that of the League of Cambrai, with the shield adorned with the heraldic coats of arms of the opposing powers (these, and the others in the monument were done by Danese Cattaneo, a pupil of Sansovino).

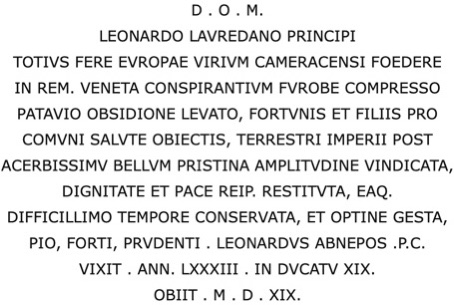

Doge Francesco Loredan died on 19 May 1762. The funeral took place on May 25, and he was buried in the Basilica of Santi Giovanni e Paolo, in Leonardo Loredan's dogal tomb. The funeral cost an impressive sum of around 18,700 ducats.

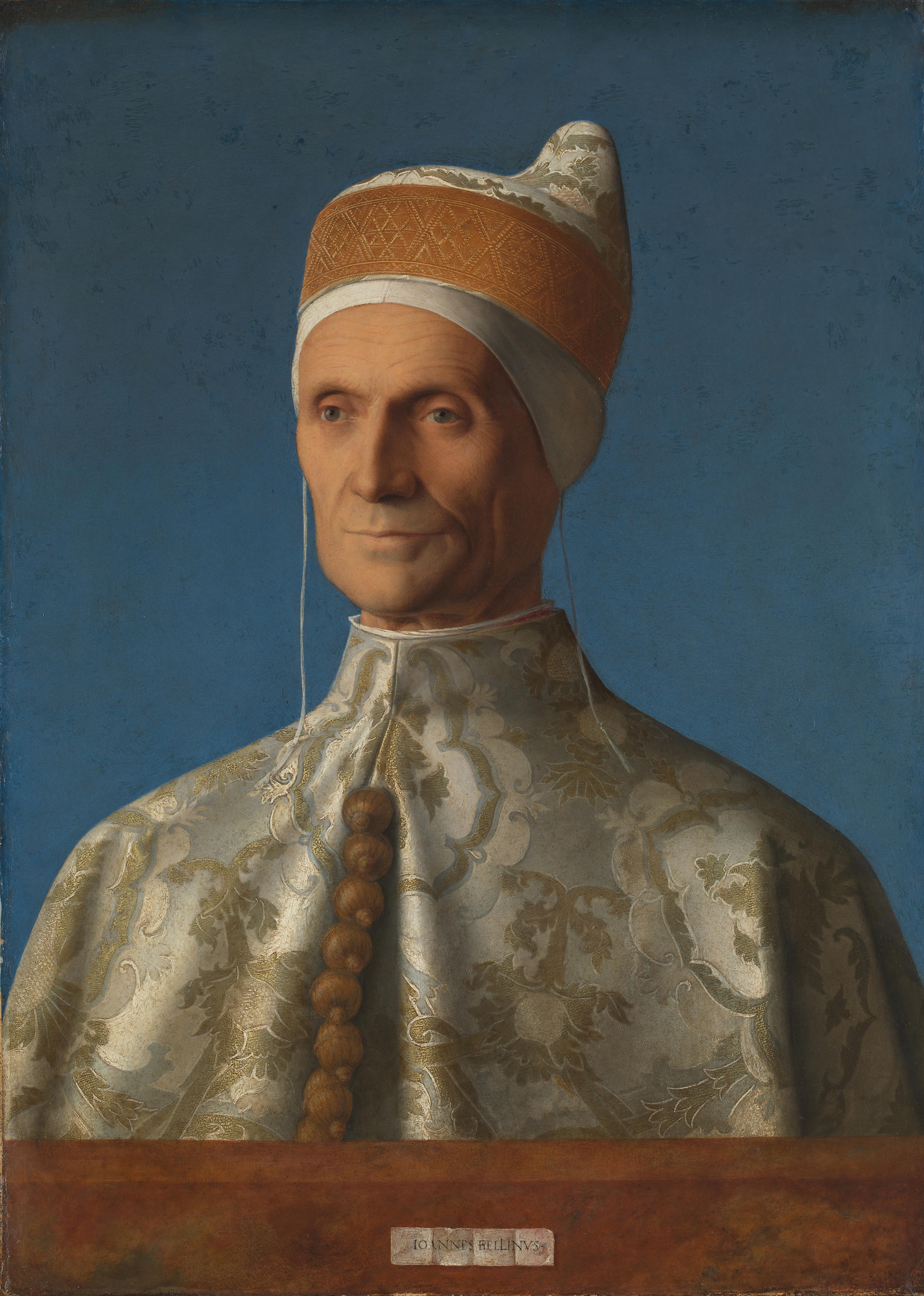
Doge Leonardo Loredan, portrait by Giovanni Bellini, 1501, National Gallery, London

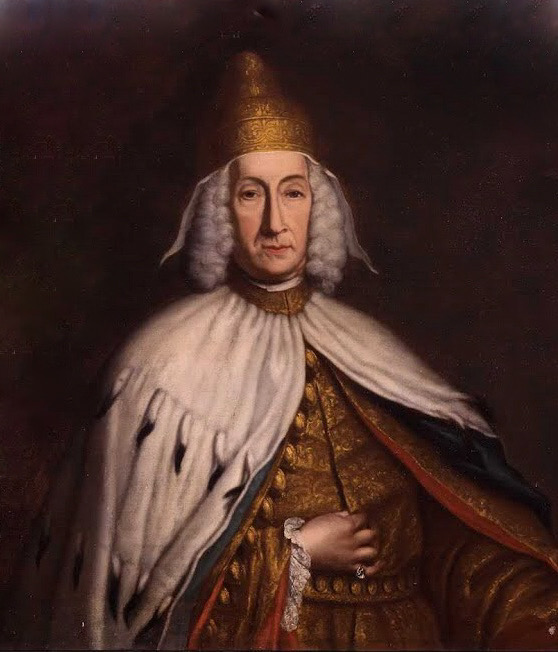
Doge Francesco Loredan, portrait by Jacopo Guarana
