= Girolamo Campagna =

Italian sculptor (1549–1625)

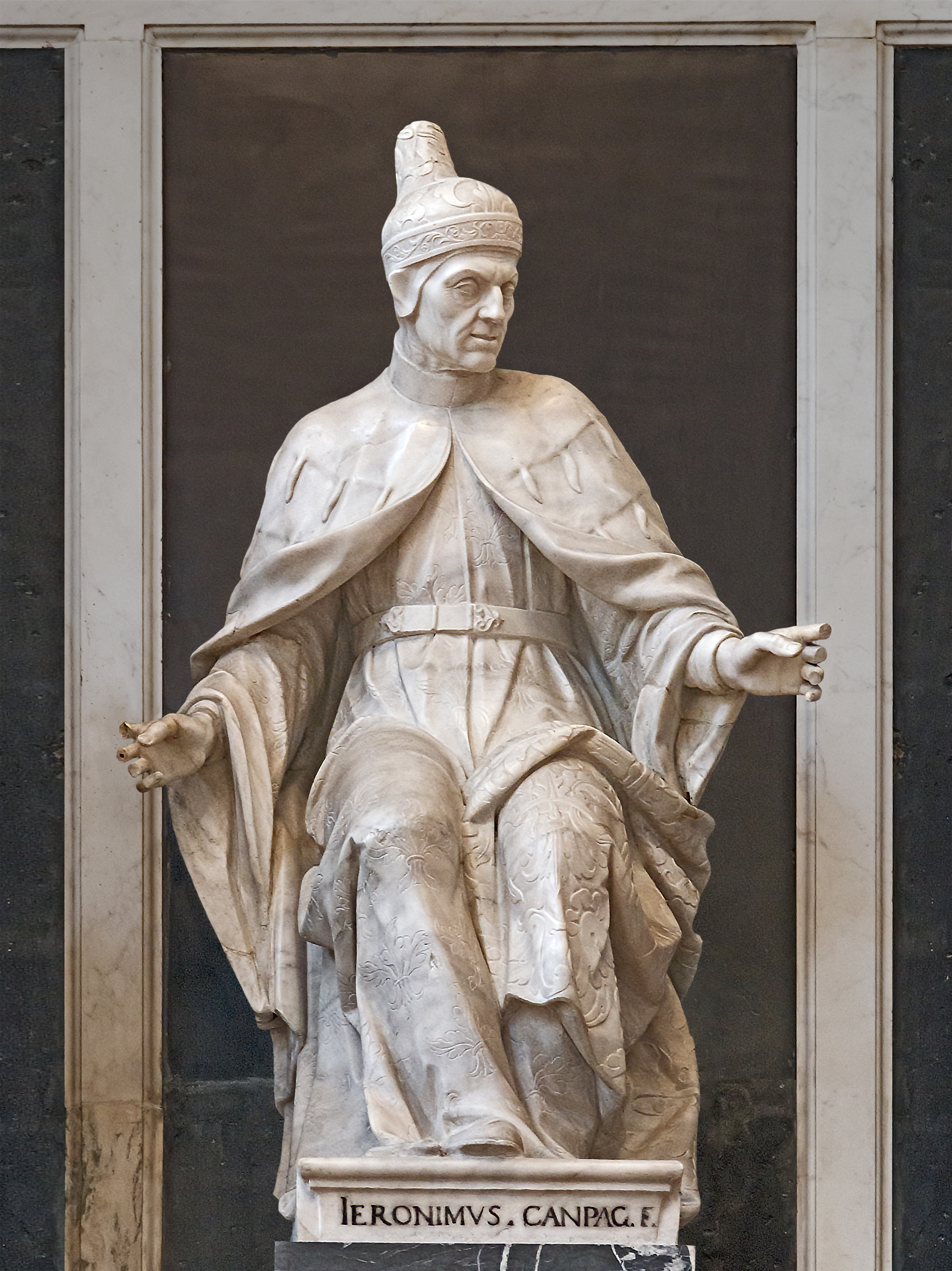
Statue of Leonardo Loredan in Santi Giovanni e Paolo, Venice

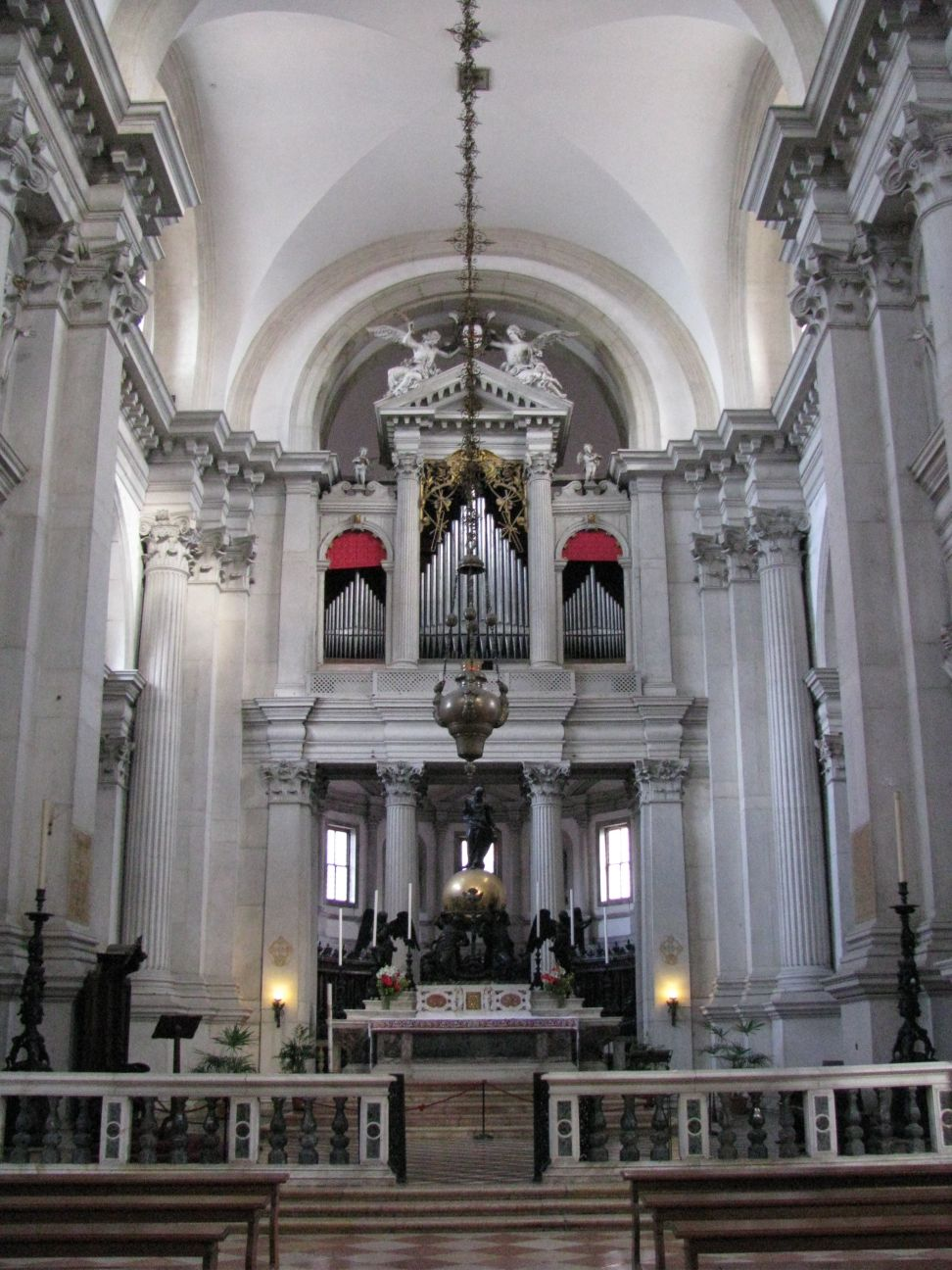
Main altar San Giorgio Maggiore

Girolamo Campagna (1549–1625) was a Northern Italian sculptor.

== Life ==
Born in Verona, he went to Venice in 1572 and studied under both Jacopo Sansovino and Danese Cattaneo, and completed many of the latter's works. He was responsible for the figure of Doge Leonardo Loredan on the tomb which Cattaneo made in Santi Giovanni e Paolo, Venice. After his master's death, Campagna went to Padua where he secured the commission intended for Cattaneo in the Basilica of Saint Anthony of Padua. This was his masterpiece, a bas-relief of the saint bringing back to life a man who had been murdered.

Some years later Campagna made another trip to Padua and wrought the bronze tabernacle for in the Basilica of St Antony of Padua, in the Chapel of the Holy Sacrament (Cappella del Santissimo Sacramento, also known as Cappella Gattamelata), in the right aisle.

== Works ==
The greater part of his life was spent in Venice, where he produced the majority of his works:

- the statues of St Francis and St Clare bearing the ostensorium at Santa Maria dei Miracoli;
- the statue of St Justina of Padua over the door of the Arsenal, commemorating the Battle of Lepanto (1571), which occurred on her feast-day (7 October), during Campagna's lifetime;
- the colossal St Sebastian at the Zecca;
- the figures of the Virgin Mary, the Archangel Gabriel and patron saints of Venice, in relief on the Ponte di Rialto;
- the group in bronze of Christ on a globe, supported by the Four Evangelists and a Madonna for the second altar in the left nave at San Giorgio Maggiore;
- the statues of Saint Roch (Sala terrena), Saint John the Baptist and St. Sebastian (Sala superiore) at Scuola Grande di San Rocco;
- the statues at San Sebastiano;
- a chimney piece for the Sala del Collegio at the Doge's Palace.
- He also made terracotta figures in San Zulian and worked in the Frari.

At the end of the 16th Century he was the most famous sculptor in Venice and was commissioned with the most important artworks.

In Verona there is an Annunciation over the portal of the old Palazzo del Consiglio and a Madonna at the Collegio dei Mercatanti.

In 1590 he first produced bronze statues.
