= Leonardo Loredan =

Doge of Venice from 1501 to 1521

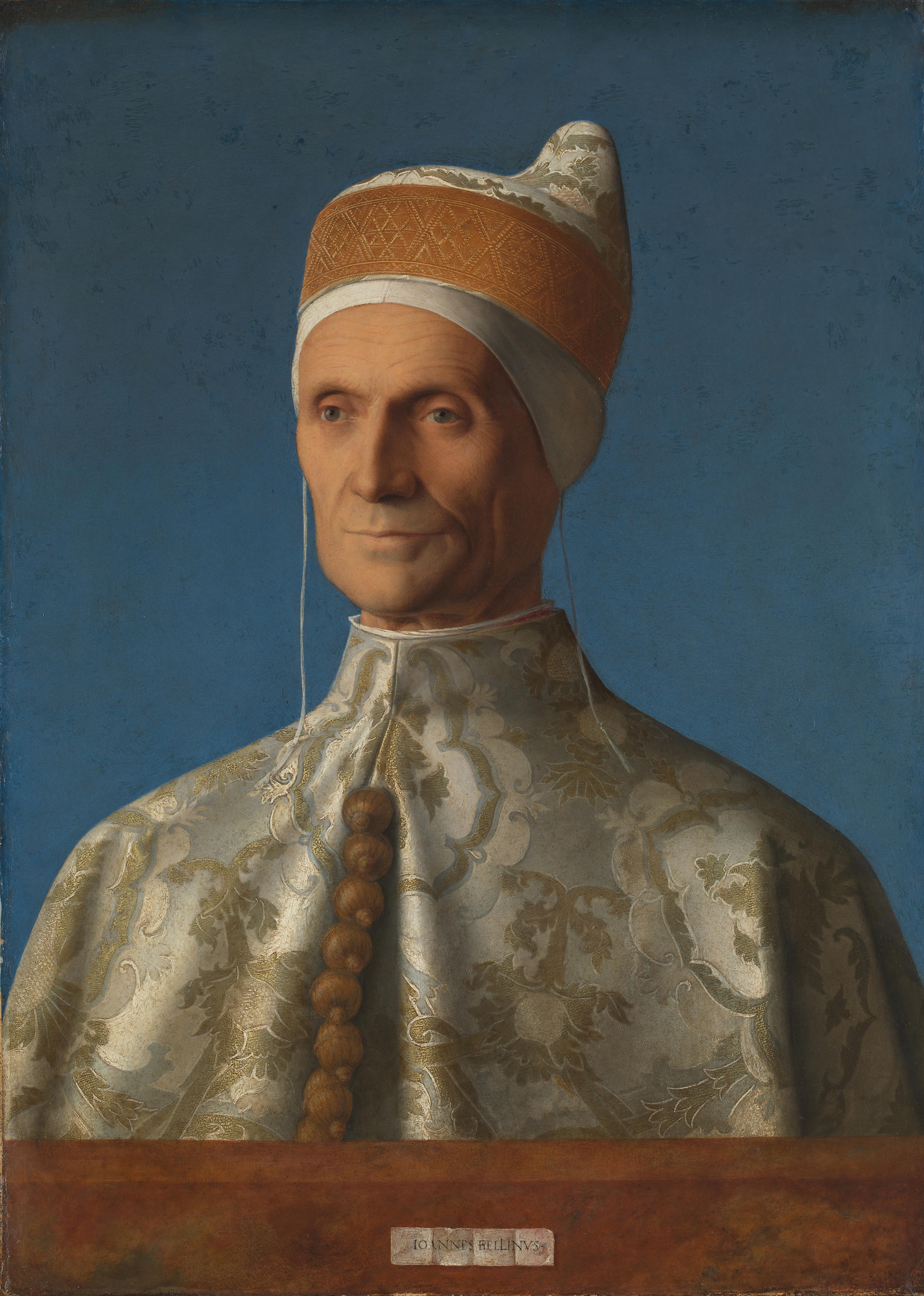
- Portrait of Doge Leonardo Loredan (1501)

Doge of Venice
- Reign: 13 October 1501 – 22 June 1521
- Coronation: 13 October 1501
- Predecessor: Agostino Barbarigo
- Successor: Antonio Grimani
- Born: 16 November 1436; Venice, Republic of Venice
- Died: 22 June 1521 (aged 84); Venice, Republic of Venice
- Burial: 23 June 1521; Tomb of Doge Leonardo Loredan
- Spouse: Morosina Giustiniani di S. Moisè (m. 1461; died 1500)
- Issue: 9
- House: Loredan
- Father: Gerolamo Loredan di S. Vitale
- Mother: Donata Donà di Natale
- Religion: Roman Catholicism
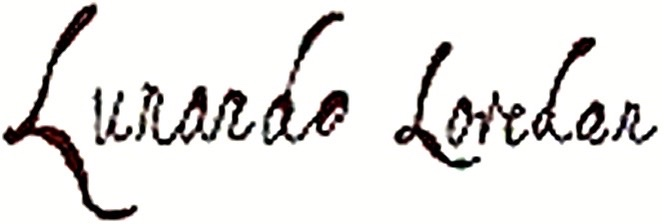
- Signature

Leonardo Loredan (Italian: [leoˈnardo loreˈdan]; Venetian: Lunardo Loredan [luˈnaɾdo loɾeˈdaŋ]; 16 November 1436 – 22 June 1521) was a Venetian nobleman and statesman who reigned as the 75th Doge of Venice from 1501 until his death in 1521. As a wartime ruler, he was one of the most important doges in the history of Venice. In the dramatic events of the early 16th century, Loredan's Machiavellian plots and cunning political manoeuvres against the League of Cambrai, the Ottomans, the Mamluks, the Pope, the Republic of Genoa, the Holy Roman Empire, the French, the Egyptians and the Portuguese saved Venice from downfall.

Born into the noble Loredan family in 1436, Leonardo dedicated his youth to classical education, after which he focused on trade in Africa and the Levant, in line with family tradition. Legend has it that in Africa a fortune-teller predicted for him the future of a prince in his homeland. In 1461 he married Morosina Giustiniani, whose influential family, according to some historians, played a significant role in his election as Doge later on.

He began his political ascent as a lawyer in a legal magistracy concerned mainly with financial scandals and bankruptcies, which he followed with an illustrious career that included positions such as Sage of the College, Sage of the Terraferma, Camerlengo di Comùn, Podestà of Padua, ducal councillor for Cannaregio, and finally Procurator of Saint Mark, one of the highest and most distinguished offices in the Venetian Republic, which allowed him to rise to the political top of the state. In October 1501, he was elected the 75th Doge of Venice.

Loredan's reign began during the disastrous Second Ottoman–Venetian War, which he settled with a peace treaty in 1503 at the cost of considerable loss of territory. Later that year a dispute arose between Loredan and Pope Julius II, after Venice occupied territory in the northern Papal States. This escalated into the 1509 War of the League of Cambrai, in which Venice was fighting an alliance of the Pope and France. Venice was defeated, but in 1513 Loredan formed a new alliance with the French King Louis XII against Pope Julius. This resulted in a decisive victory.

It was under his rule, in 1516, that a decree was enacted to formally isolate the Jews of Venice. Thus was created the first “Ghetto” in the world, from which all others derive their name.

Despite his last years being laden with financial and political scandals, some artfully mounted by rival families, Loredan died with great fame in June 1521 and was interred in the Basilica of Saints John and Paul, in a simple grave which no longer exists. In 1572, a monumental tomb was erected for him in the Basilica, adorned with Corinthian columns made of Carrara marble, which included work by architects and sculptors Girolamo Grappiglia, Girolamo Campagna and Danese Cattaneo.

Loredan was portrayed in numerous portraits and paintings, the most famous of which being the Portrait of Doge Leonardo Loredan, painted by Giovanni Bellini in 1501 and now on display in the National Gallery in London. In 1507, Bellini painted Loredan with his four sons in the Portrait of the Loredan family, now on display at the Gemäldegalerie in Berlin. Loredan was also notably portrayed by Vittore Carpaccio, and posthumously by Pompeo Batoni in a work known as The Triumph of Venice (1737), where he is depicted in front of the Doge's Palace surrounded by mythological figures symbolising his victory over the League of Cambrai. In 1503, the Panegyricus Leonardo Lauredano was created in his honour.

== Early life and marriage ==
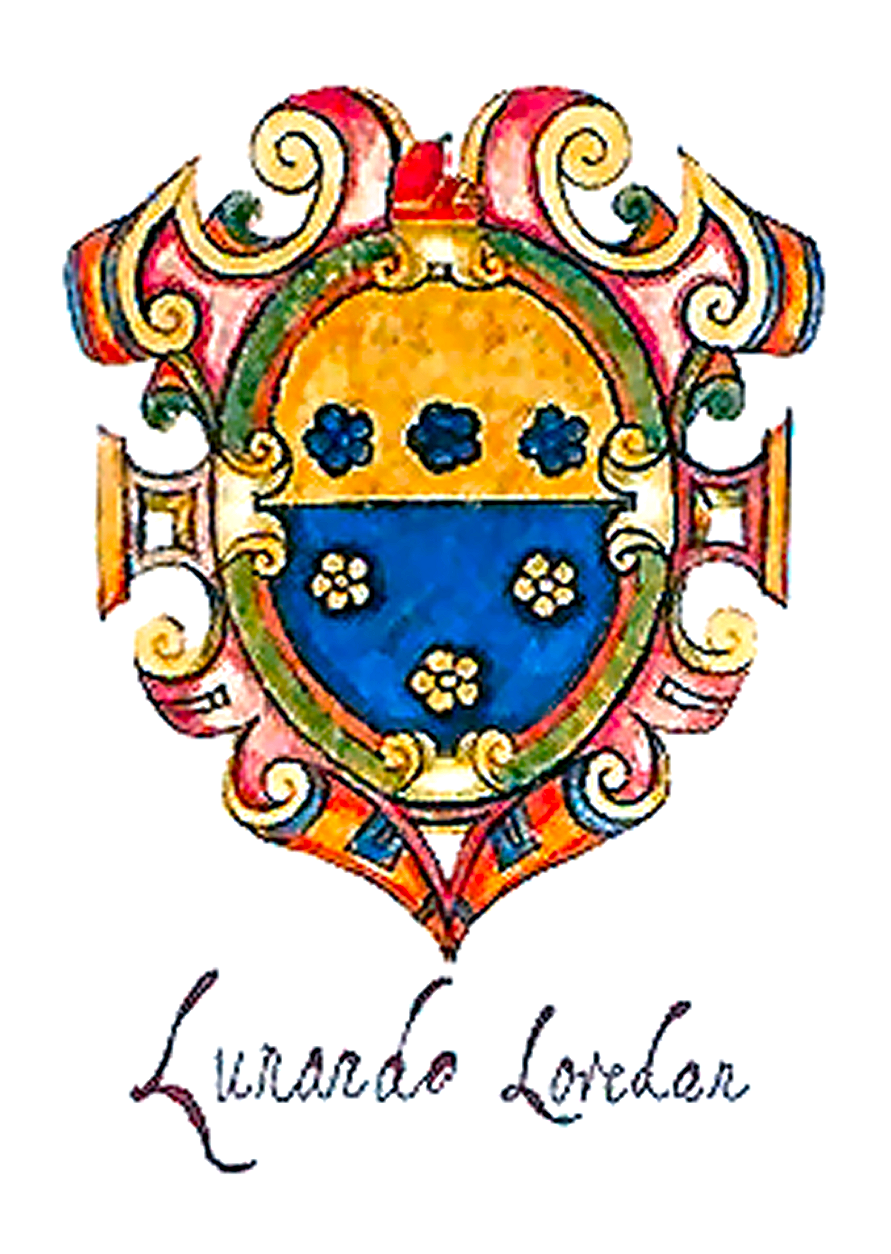
Coat of arms of Leonardo Loredan

Leonardo Loredan was born in Venice on 16 November 1436 as the eldest son of Gerolamo Loredan di S. Vitale, known as dal Barbaro, and of Donata Donà di Natale, niece of the archbishop of Candia Pietro. From childhood Leonardo demonstrated "exceptional maturity, combined with goodness and with the most noble talent of genius", as the historian Andrea Navagero testified. After a good classical education, he devoted himself with some success to trade in North Africa and the Levant, to increase the family's finances. Legend has it that while in Africa a fortune-teller predicted for him the future of a prince in his homeland.

He had a brother, Pietro (1466–1510), of poor health and unstable character, dedicated to studying alchemy in Padua, where he had moved, and disinterested in political life. In the will drawn up in February 1474 in Padua where he was podestà, the father designated Leonardo as the executor of the will and the sole heir of the estate and granted Pietro an annuity of 250 ducats.

In 1461 Leonardo married Giustina Giustiniani di Pancrazio di Marco, of the wealthy branch of San Moisè, who died in 1500, one year before Leonardo became Doge, and with whom he had nine children: the procurator Lorenzo (1462–1534), Girolamo (1468–1532), the only one to continue the branch, Alvise (1472–1521), Vincenzo (died in Tripoli in 1499), Bernardo (1481–1519), Donata, wife of Giacomo Gussoni da S. Vitale, Maria, wife of Giovanni Venier, of the branch that gave birth to Doge Francesco Venier (1554–56), Paola, wife of Giovanni Alvise Venier, descendant of Doge Antonio Venier (1382–1400), and Elisabetta, wife of Zaccaria Priuli.

Some historians claim that his election as Doge in October 1501 was not entirely due to his talent as a politician but also because his wife came from the very influential Giustiniani family.

== Political career ==
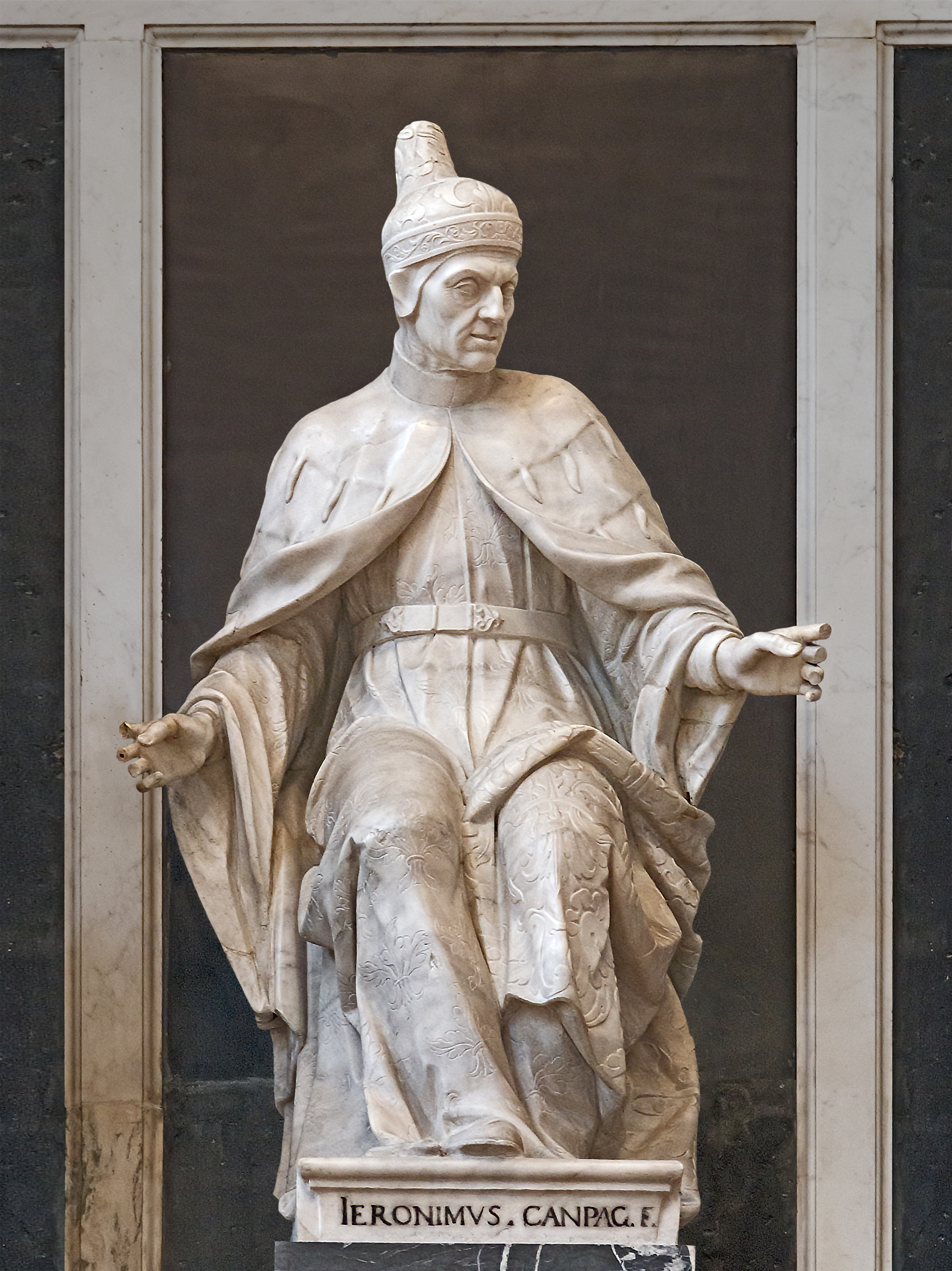
Statue of Leonardo Loredan in the Basilica of Santi Giovanni e Paolo.

Loredan began his political ascent on 13 December 1455, at the age of nineteen, when he became a lawyer in the Giudici di Petizion, a magistracy concerned mainly with financial scandals and bankruptcies, for which he had Filippo Loredan as guarantor. A few years later, Leonardo sat on the Savi del Consiglio where he was responsible for assessing and evaluating foreign policy matters prior to their examination in the Senate. On 13 November 1468 he became consul of the Merchants and on 15 November 1473 he was elected Camerlengo di Comun. In 1480, along with Marco and Agostino Soranzo, Andrea Erizzo, Paolo Contarini and Nicolò Donà, he was chosen to administer approximately 30,000 ducats, collected through free donations from devotees of the miraculous image of the Virgin, to be used for the construction of the church dedicated to S. Maria dei Miracoli, in the district of S. Leone (Cannaregio), designed by Pietro Lombardo and his sons. In 1481 he was elected as a Savio di Terraferma and in November 1483 he was among the electors of Doge Marco Barbarigo.

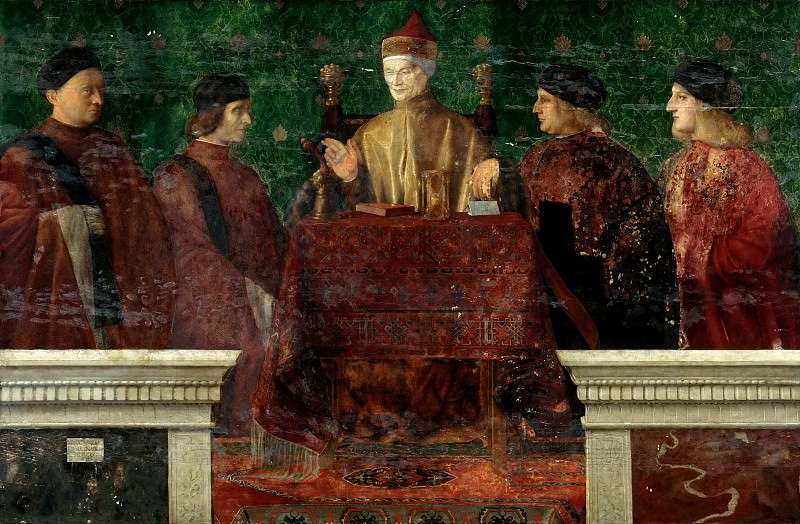
Doge Leonardo Loredan with Four Sons, by Giovanni Bellini, 1507, Gemäldegalerie, Berlin.

Between 1485 and 1486 he was still appointed Savio del Consiglio, and on 29 April 1487 he was elected mayor of Padua, taking over from Antonio Venier. He held this position until 1489, when he was elected to the prestigious position of ducal councillor. In 1490 he was called again as a Savio del Consiglio. On 1 August 1491 he was re-elected ducal councillor for the Cannaregio district and in 1492 he returned as Savio del Consiglio. In July 1492, Loredan secured the election to one of the most distinguished offices of the Republic, that of Procurator of Saint Mark, which allowed him to rise to the political pinnacle of the state. On 3 May 1493 he was among the Governatori alle Entrate and from 1495 to 1501 he was continuously re-elected Savio del Consigli. In his capacity as procurator and also as Savio del Consigli, he was among the three designated by Doge Agostino Barbarigo, on 31 March 1495, to negotiate the alliance between Venice, Pope Alexander VI, Holy Roman Emperor Maximilian I of Habsburg, the Spanish rulers Ferdinand V and Isabella I and the Duke of Milan Ludovico Maria Sforza (Henry VII of England also joined), with the aim of countering the military operations of the King of France Charles VIII who had, almost without encountering resistance, entered Naples in February. The army of the League, led by the Marquis of Mantua Francesco II Gonzaga, in the Battle of Fornovo on 6 July forced the French army to withdraw from Italian territory. In October of the same year, Loredan signed the agreement for the conduct of Nicolò Orsini, count of Pitigliano, to the services of the Republic of Venice as captain-general of the land forces for a period of three to four years. In January 1497, Loredan, with the Savio di Terraferma Lodovico Venier, ratified the surrender of Taranto on behalf of the doge.

On 11 July 1501, Loredan was appointed podestà in Cremona by the Senate, but he refused.

On the death of Barbarigo (20 September 1501), Loredan was one of the designated candidates in the election of the new doge, which began on 27 September, and finished on 2 October with Loredan coming out first (with 27 votes in the sixth hand of the first ballot). The election was successful thanks to his and his wife's influential relations and the sudden death of the most popular opponent, the wealthy procurator Filippo Tron, son of Doge Nicolò Tron. The announcement was made by the procurator Nicolò Mocenigo and celebrated by the scholars, with numerous praises then given to the press.

== Dogeship ==
=== War with the Ottomans ===
At the time of his accession to the dogeship, Venice was engaged in the Second Ottoman–Venetian War (1499–1503). During the conflict, Loredan had lost his cousin Andrea Loredan, a naval officer, in the disastrous Battle of Zonchio (1499), and the war had proceeded badly on land too, with the Venetians losing considerable territory. This included the strategic city of Modon (1500), which was the site of a bloody battle involving hand-to-hand combat, followed by the beheading of hundreds of Venetians after the Turkish victory. Shortly before Loredan's accession, the Ottomans took Durazzo, the capital of Venetian Albania on 17 August 1501, and also plundered Venetian Dalmatia.

The war took a heavy toll on the Venetian economy and in 1502–1503 Loredan agreed a peace treaty with the Turks. He was helped in the negotiations by Andrea Gritti, a Venetian who had been conducting trade in Constantinople and would later become doge of Venice himself. Venice paid a high price for this treaty including loss of land and a requirement to pay an annual tribute to the Turks.

In 1509, the Battle of Diu took place, in India, where the Portuguese fleet defeated an Ottoman and Mamluk fleet, which had been transferred from the Mediterranean Sea to the Red Sea with Venetian help. The defeat marked the end of the profitable Spice trade, which was bought by Venetians from the Mamluks in Egypt and in turn monopolised its sale in Europe, reaping great revenues from it.

=== War with the Emperor ===
In January 1508, emperor Maximilian I undertook an Italienzug, and in February attacked the Republic by invading the Terraferma. Venetian troops were victorious at the Battle of Cadore (2 March), also occupying Trieste (6 May) and several other cities in the neighboring imperial regions. The war ended favorably for the Republic, in June 1508, by the conclusion of a three year truce between the doge and the emperor.

=== War of the League of Cambrai ===
Allegory of the Victory over the League of Cambrai, by Palma il Giovane, featuring Doge Leonardo Loredan

Upon the death of Pope Alexander VI in 1503, Venice occupied several territories in the northern Papal States. When Julius II was elected as Alexander's successor, the Venetians expected their seizure of papal territory to be tacitly accepted, as Julius had been nicknamed Il Veneziano for his pro-Venetian sympathies. Those expectations turned out to be unrealistic, since the new pope aspired to restore all of lost possessions. Although willing to reach a compromise, based on paying an annual tribute to the pope, the Republic refused to surrender the disputed regions, thus alienating itself from the pope.

In December 1508, the anti-Venetian League of Cambrai was formed by the emperor Maximilian I and the French king Louis XII, who were joined by king Ferdinand II of Aragon and pope Julius II. Already in January 1509, the doge Loredan received the farewell visit from the residing French ambassador Janus Lascaris, who was leaving Venice, and by April a special envoy of the French king arrived, informing Loredan that the state of war was formally declared to the Republic. On 27 April, pope Julius II issued the interdict against the Venetians, provoking a series of protests from the doge, who responded by questioning the validity of pope's use of such religious instruments in settling purely political and territorial disputes.

After losing to the league's forces at the Battle of Agnadello, Venice found its holdings in Italy shrinking drastically. Soon Padua, Venice's most strategically vital Terraferma holding, had fallen, and Venice itself was threatened. Loredan united the population, calling for sacrifice and total mobilisation. Padua was retaken, though Venice was still forced to accept a reluctant peace with the pope. It was concluded on 15 February 1510, and already on 24 February pope Julius II officially revoked the interdict, that was imposed on the Venetians in 1509.

In the summer of 1510, doge Loredan and pope Julius concluded an aliance against the French. The alliance was on the verge of victory, but a dispute arose over territory. Emperor Maximilian refused to surrender any Imperial territory, which in his eyes included most of the Veneto, to the Republic; to this end, he signed an agreement with the Pope to exclude Venice entirely from the final partition. When the Republic objected, Julius threatened to reform the League of Cambrai.

In response, Venice turned to Louis; on 23 March 1513, a treaty pledging to divide all of northern Italy between France and the Republic was signed at Blois. Under this alliance with the French King Louis XII, the Venetians achieved a decisive victory over the Papal States, and were able to secure back all the territories they had lost. In addition, the Papacy was forced to repay many outstanding debts to the Loredan family totaling approximately 500,000 ducats, an enormous sum of money.

In December 1516, by the Treaty of Brussels, the emperor Maximilian I agreed to end hostilities by concluding the truce with Venice, and already by January 1517 main provisions of the treaty were put in effect, by ceasing all military operations and surrendering Verona to the Venetians. The end of war was marked by various celebrations in Venice, that took place from January to March 1517, thus marking the high point of doge Loredan's rule.

=== Post-war years ===
The end of the war and the behavior of the doge, who perhaps thought he should enjoy the last years of his life rather than dedicate them to the administration of the state, led to a certain frivolity in Venetian society. Financial scandals were the order of the day and many public offices were bought at disproportionate prices rather than obtained on merit. In this period the doge bought titles and offices for children and relatives, making the most of his influence.

Despite Loredan's wishes, he could not lead this pleasant life for long as he began to suffer from health problems. Around the first days of June 1521 his health began to deteriorate and soon gangrene developed in his leg. Any intervention was useless and the gangrene spread, killing him in the night between 20 and 21 June. It is said that, to warn the councilors and regents of the state, the news of his death was silenced by the doge's own son and was communicated only in the late morning.

Interestingly, the commercialism and non-exemplary behaviour of his final years did not escape the watchful eye of the Inquisitors of the Dead, a magistracy created after the death of Francesco Foscari, charged with investigating the final "account" of the doge. Perhaps the trial was artfully mounted for political purposes but certainly there were incriminating motives, because the heirs of the doge, despite being defended by the lawyer Carlo Contarini, one of the best of the time, were sentenced to a hefty fine of 9,500 ducats.

== Death ==
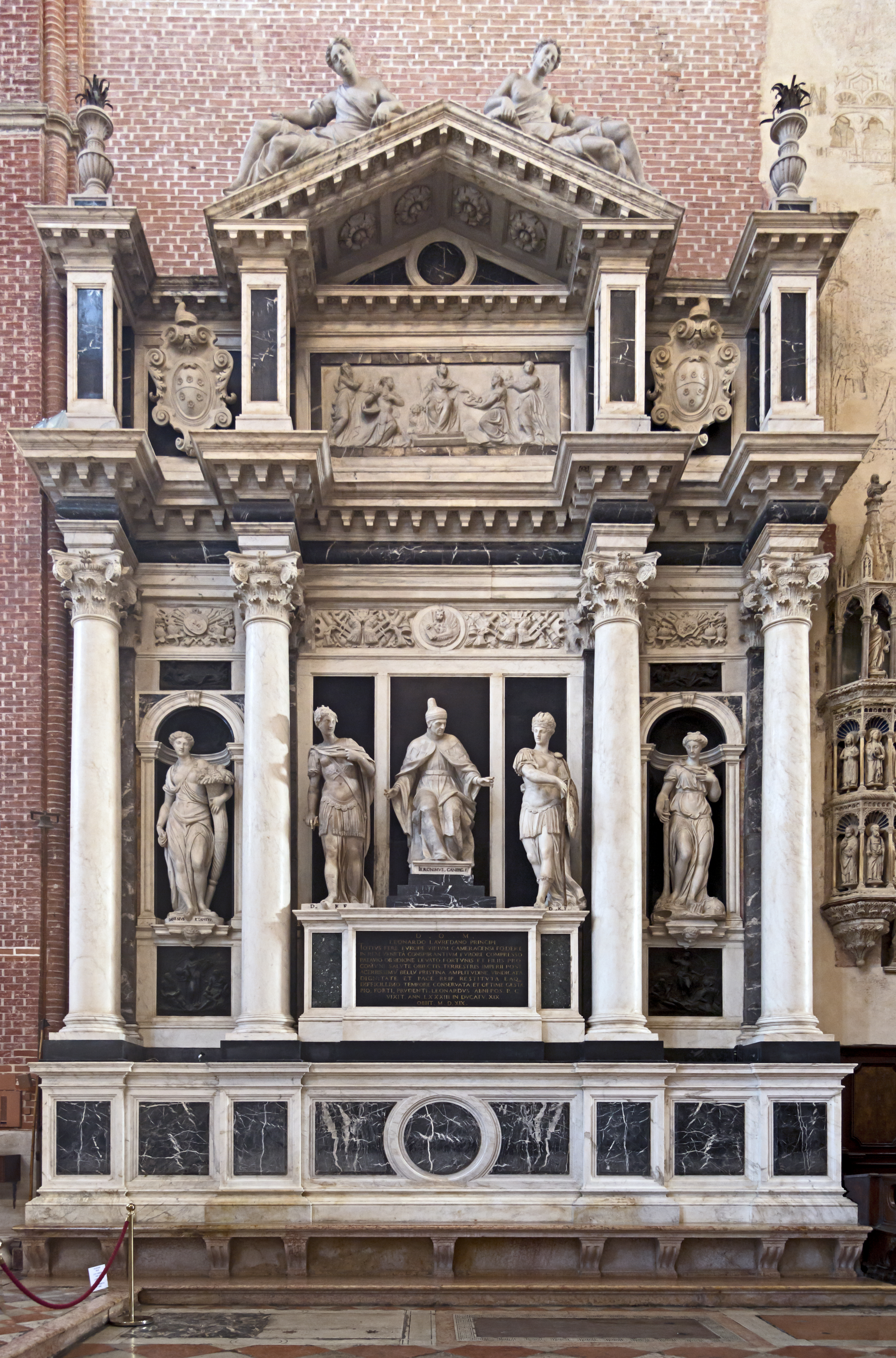
Tomb of Doge Leonardo Loredan, Basilica of Santi Giovanni e Paolo

Doge Loredan's health was never excellent, but his character and intellectual energy supported him well in his government posts. In 1514, due to an accidental fall, he was injured in the leg but never stopped presiding over the meetings of the sovereign councils. From 14 June 1521 he was no longer able to attend government meetings, due to a feverish state and his conditions worsened quickly.

He died in Venice on 22 June 1521. The death, which occurred between eight and nine, was kept secret until sixteen at the behest of the children who, during their father's agony, had no regard for transporting furniture and objects from the doge's apartment to their residence. As is customary, the body was subjected to embalming practices. On the morning of 23 June, after the body was moved to the Piovego room of the Doge's Palace, the coffin was closed. At the solemn funeral the eulogy was read by the scholar Andrea Navagero, and Pietro Bembo, then abbot and secretary of Pope Leo X, was also present.

Loredan died "with great fame as a prince". He was interred in the church of Santi Giovanni e Paolo, in a simple tomb with a celestial marble headstone without inscription, placed above the steps of the main altar and now no longer existing. In about 1572, and after some disputes between the heirs and the friars of the church, a funeral monument was erected for him, divided into three parts and adorned with Corinthian columns in Carrara marble, placed to the left of the main altar, with architecture by Girolamo Grappiglia, and adorned with an extremely lifelike statue, an early work by the sculptor Girolamo Campagna, which depicts him in the act of "getting up and boldly throwing himself in defence of Venice against Europe conspired in Cambrai". On its right was the statue of Venice with sword in hand and on the left that of the League of Cambrai, with the shield adorned with the heraldic coats of arms of the opposing powers (these, and the others in the monument were done by Danese Cattaneo, a pupil of Sansovino).

== Ancestry ==
House of Loredan-Santo Stefano (Genealogy)

Nicolò Loredan
Gerolamo Loredan (d. 1474)	Donata Donà
Leonardo Loredan (1436–1521)	Giustina Giustiniani (d. 1500)	Pietro Loredan (1466–1510)
Lorenzo Loredan (1462–1534)	Girolamo Loredan (1468–1532)	Alvise Loredan (1472–1521)	Bernardo Loredan (1481–1519)	Vincenzo Loredan (d. 1499)	Donata Loredan	Maria Loredan	Giovanni Venier	Paola Loredan	Elisabetta Loredan
Carlo Contarini (1580–1656)	Paolina Loredan	Francesco Venier (1489–1556)
Francesco Loredan	Francesca Barbarigo
Leonardo Loredan (d. 1675)	Alba Soranzo
Francesco Loredan (1656–1715)	Giovanni Loredan (1662–1725)	Andrea Loredan (1664–1704)	Caterina Grimani	Francesca Loredan	Elisabetta Loredan	Maria Loredan	Maddalena Loredan	Paolina Loredan
Francesco Loredan (1685–1762)	Girolamo Loredan	Caterina Cornaro	Giovanni Loredan (d. 1767)	Anna Maria Vendramin	Francesco Loredan	Antonio Loredan	Antonio Loredan	Leonardo Loredan	Leonardo Loredan	Girolamo Loredan	Contarina Loredan	Giovanni Tommaso Mocenigo	Alba Loredan
Andrea Loredan (d. 1750)	Caterina Loredan

Note: The branch of Santo Stefano is also known as the branch of San Vidal (San Vitale).

Note: There are some generations missing between Girolamo Loredan (1468–1532) and Francesco Loredan (17th century).

Note: Giustina Giustiniani (d. 1500), the wife of Doge Leonardo Loredan (1436–1521), is also known as Morosina Giustiniani.

Interestingly, near the Palazzo Contarini-Sceriman and the nearby bridge, Leonardo Loredan (d. 1675) was found dead in a boat. The unexplained death was the source of many rumors, claiming accidental death, murder by relatives, or murder by the Inquisitors of the Republic.

Andrea Loredan (d. 1750) died young, thus ending the male (agnatic) line of the branch of Santo Stefano.

== Leonardo Loredan in art ==
=== In painting ===
Giovanni Bellini's portrait of Loredan is notable for being one of the first frontal portraits of a reigning doge; throughout the Middle Ages, mortal men had been portrayed in profile, while the frontal view had been reserved for more sacred subjects. Bellini's portrait was painted in 1501–02, and hangs in the National Gallery, London.

Over two centuries later, when Pompeo Batoni was given a detailed programme for his large Triumph of Venice (1737) by the Odescalchi cardinal who commissioned it, Loredan was chosen to represent the office of Doge, standing amid a group of allegorical personifications.

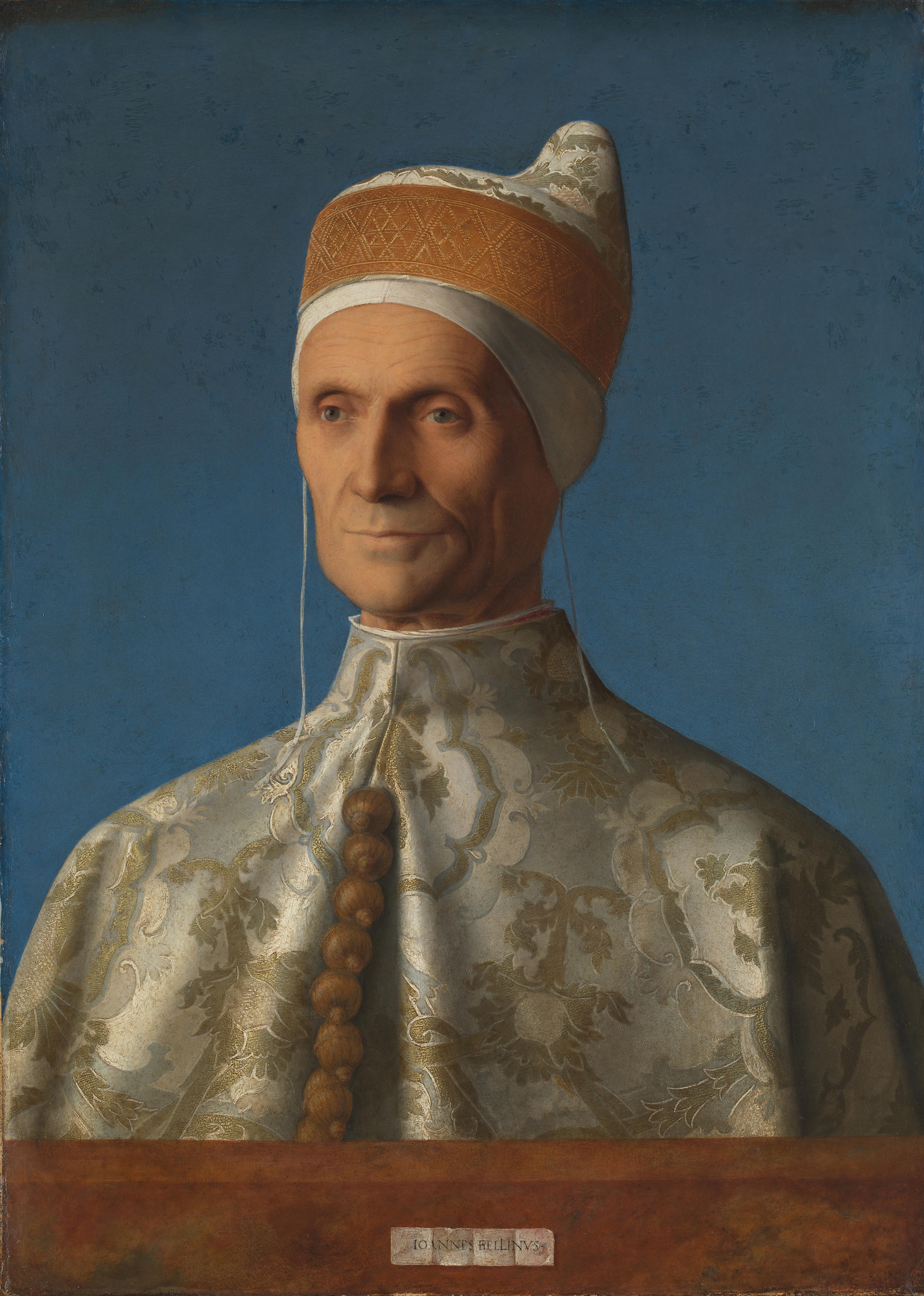
Portrait of Doge Leonardo Loredan, by Giovanni Bellini, 1501, National Gallery, London

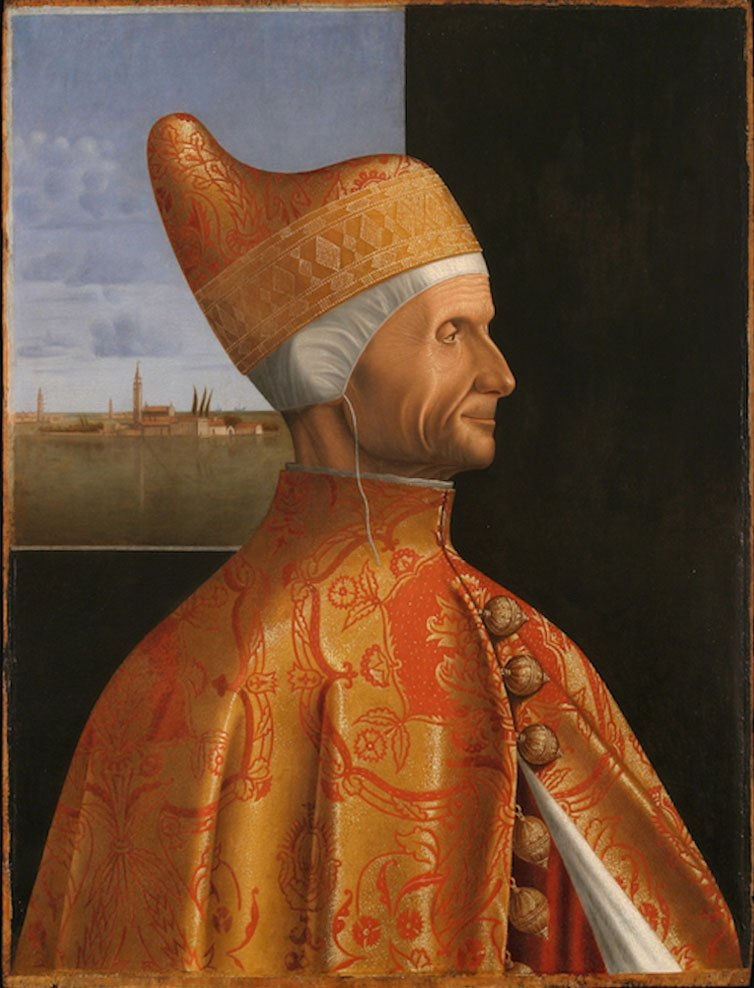
Portrait of Doge Leonardo Loredan, by Vittore Carpaccio, 1501, Museo Correr, Venice

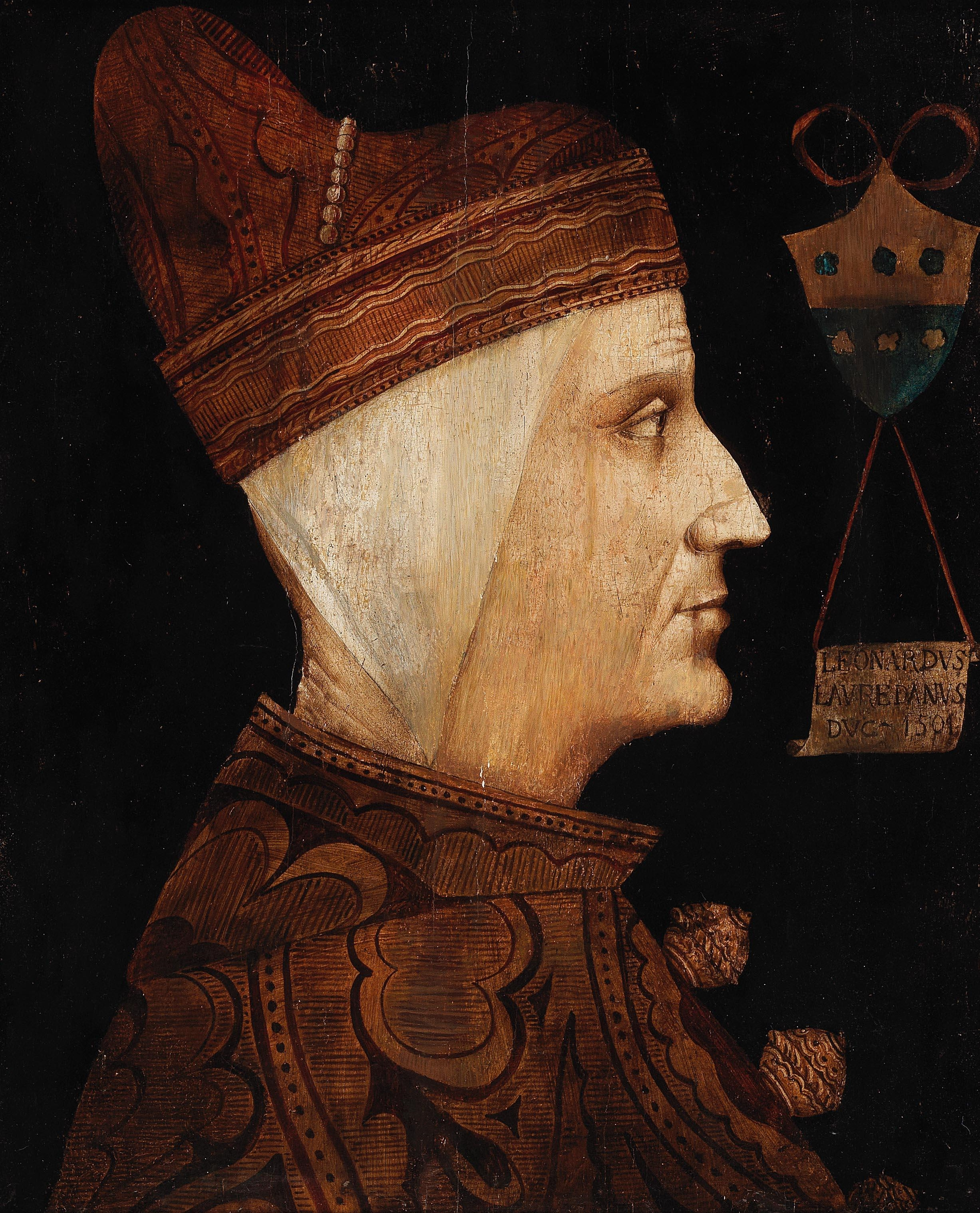
Portrait of Doge Leonardo Loredan, by Gentile Bellini, 1501, Dorotheum, Vienna

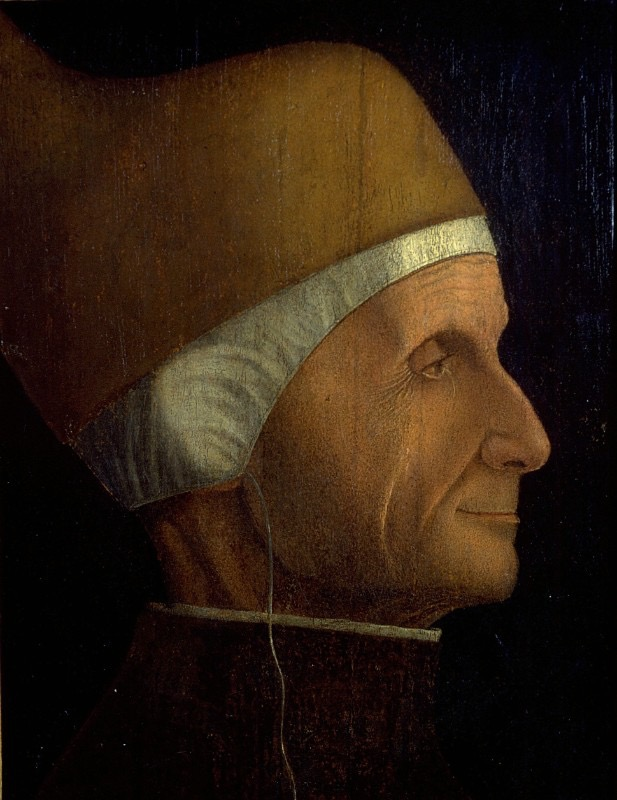
Portrait of Doge Leonardo Loredan, by Gentile Bellini, c. 1501, Fine Arts Museum of San Francisco

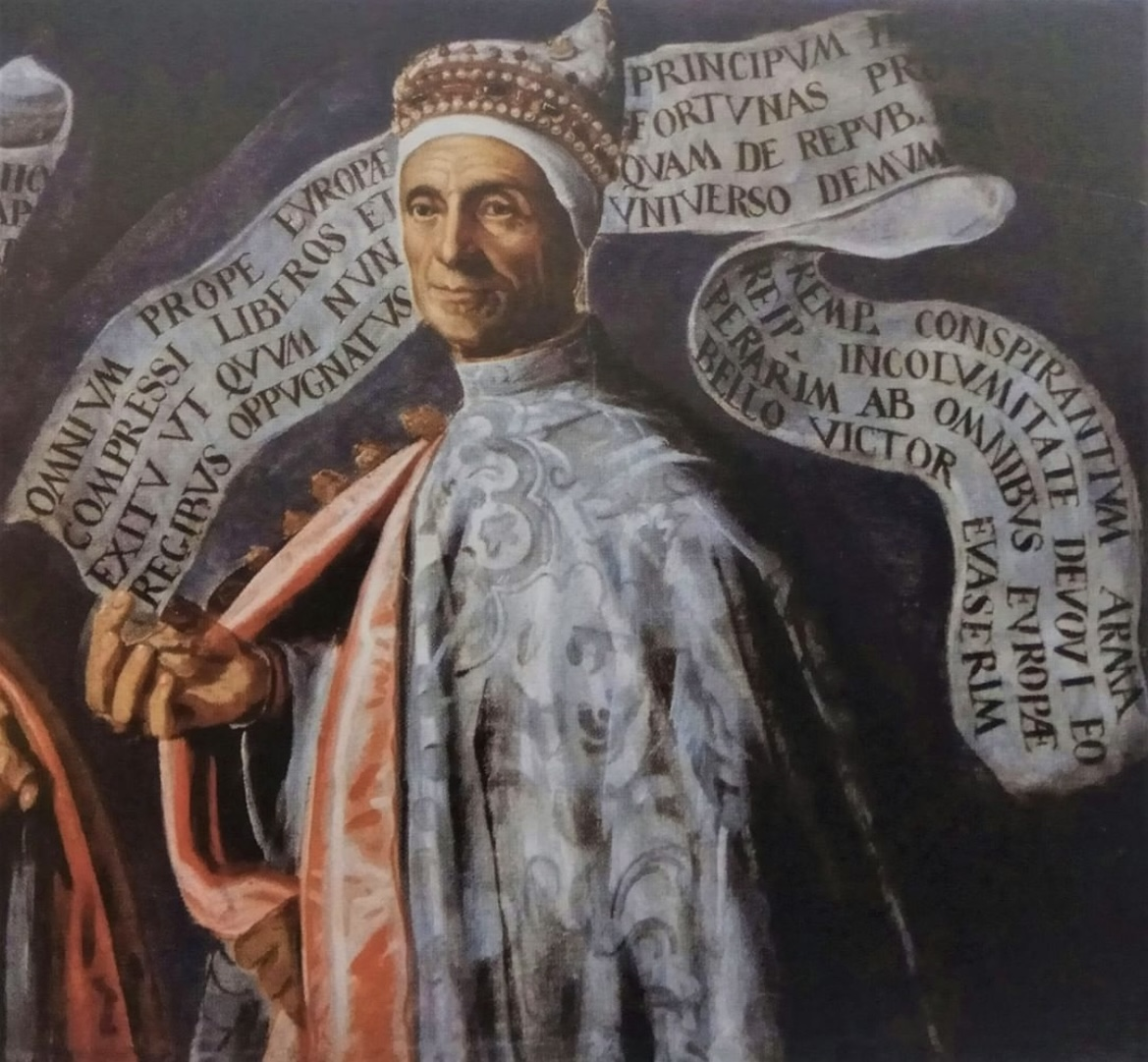
Portrait at the Doge's Palace

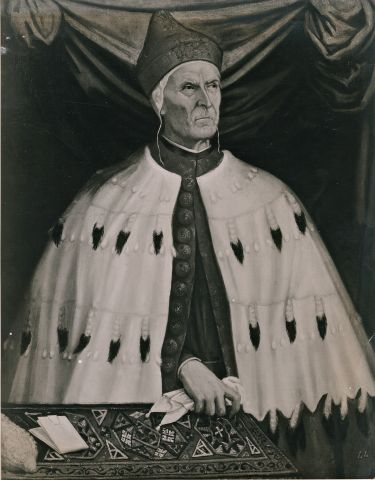
Portrait of Doge Leonardo Loredan

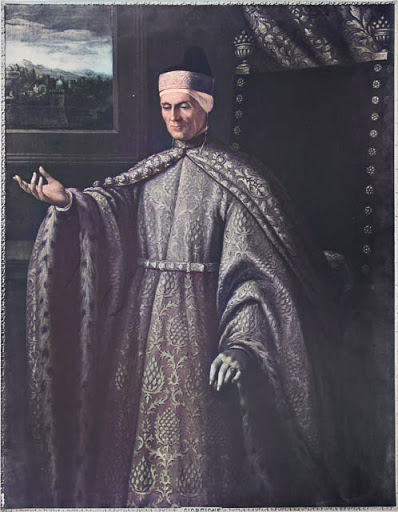
Portrait of Doge Leonardo Loredan

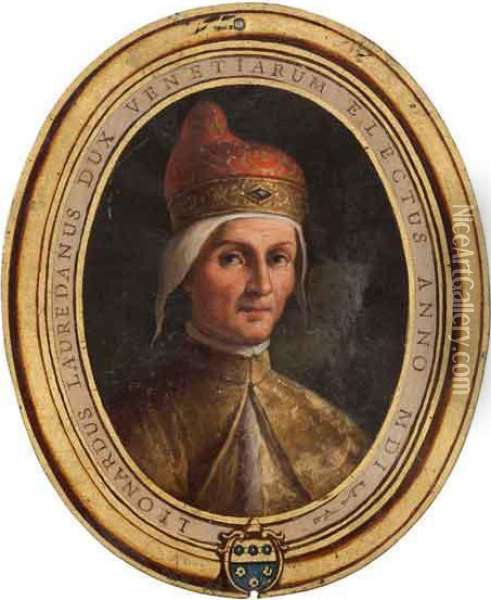
Portrait of Doge Leonardo Loredan, by Francesco Maggiotto, 18th century

Allegory of the Victory over the League of Cambrai, by Palma il Giovane, 1590, featuring Doge Leonardo Loredan, Doge's Palace, Venice

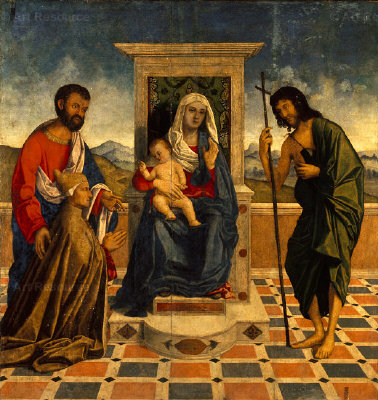
The Virgin with Child and Saints adored by Doge Leonardo Loredan, by Vincenzo Catena, 1506, Doge's Palace, Venice

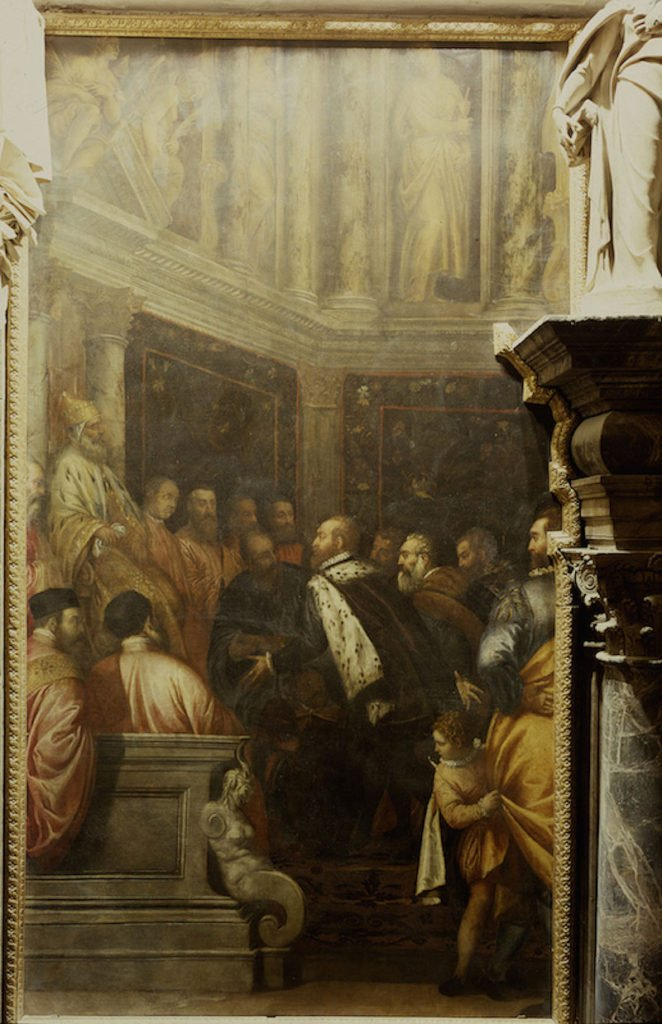
Doge Leonardo Loredan Giving Copies of the Laws of Venice to the Ambassadors from Nuremberg, by Carlo and Gabriele Caliari, 1588, Doge's Palace, Venice

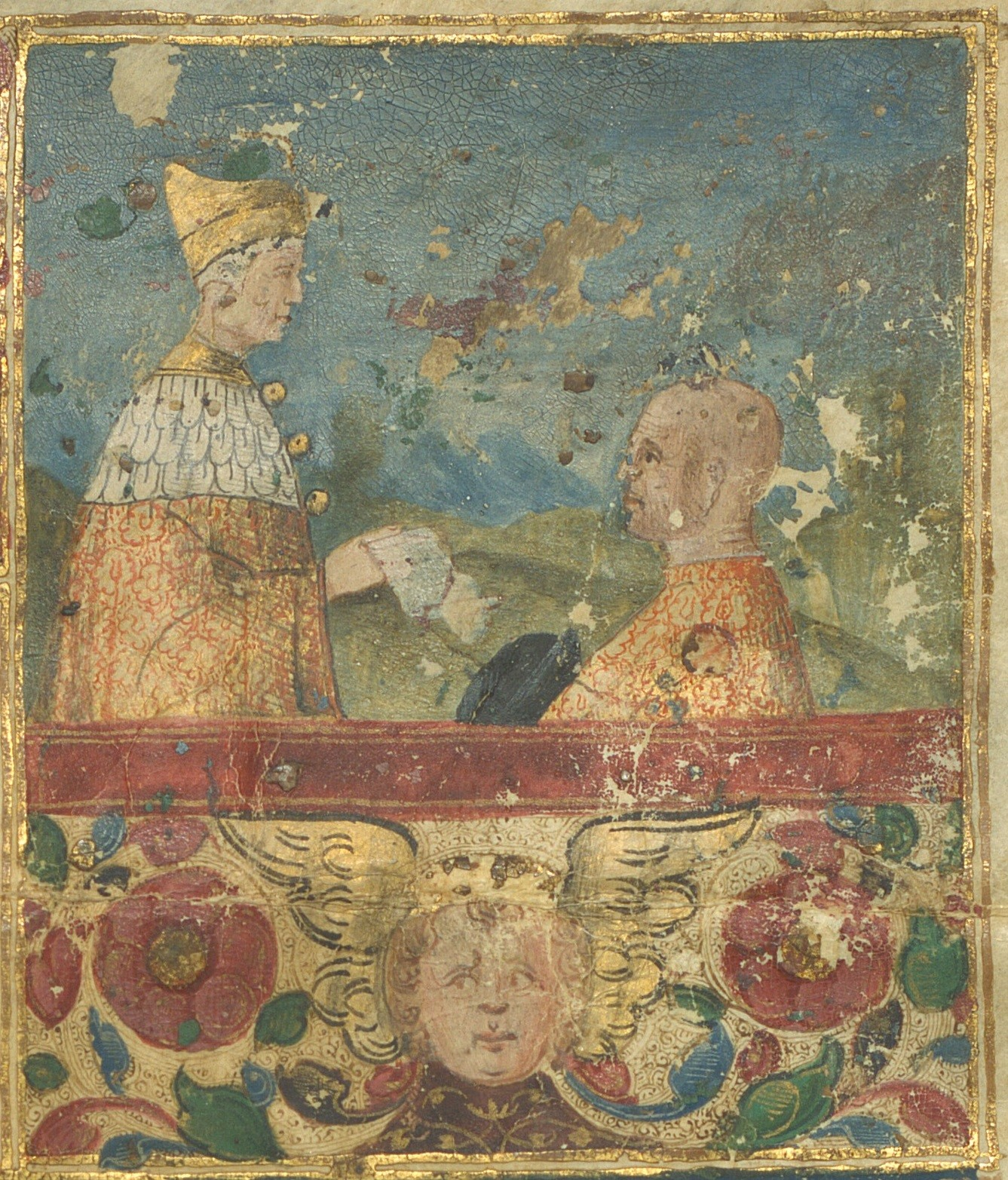
Doge Leonardo Loredan Handing a Parchment to Zauli Naldi, 1504, Manfrediana Library, Faenza

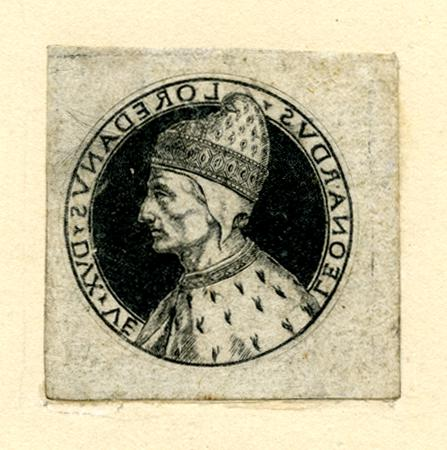
Print of Doge Leonardo Loredan, 18th century, British Museum, London

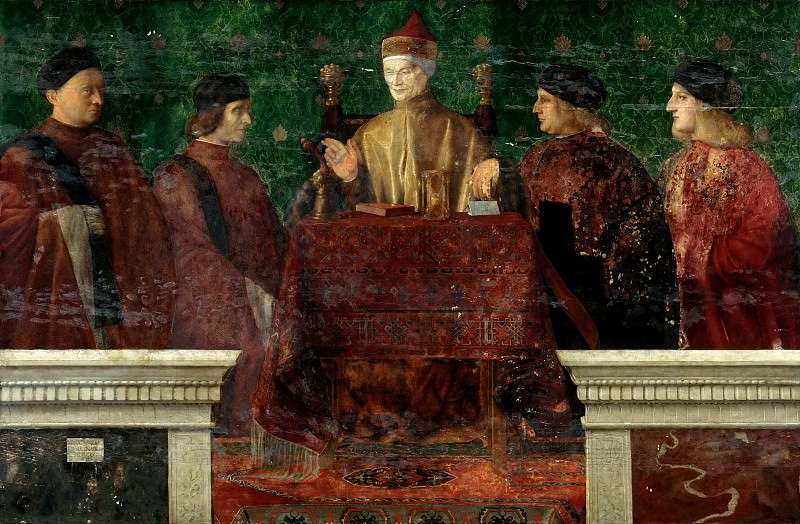
Doge Leonardo Loredan with Four Sons, by Giovanni Bellini, 1507, Gemäldegalerie, Berlin

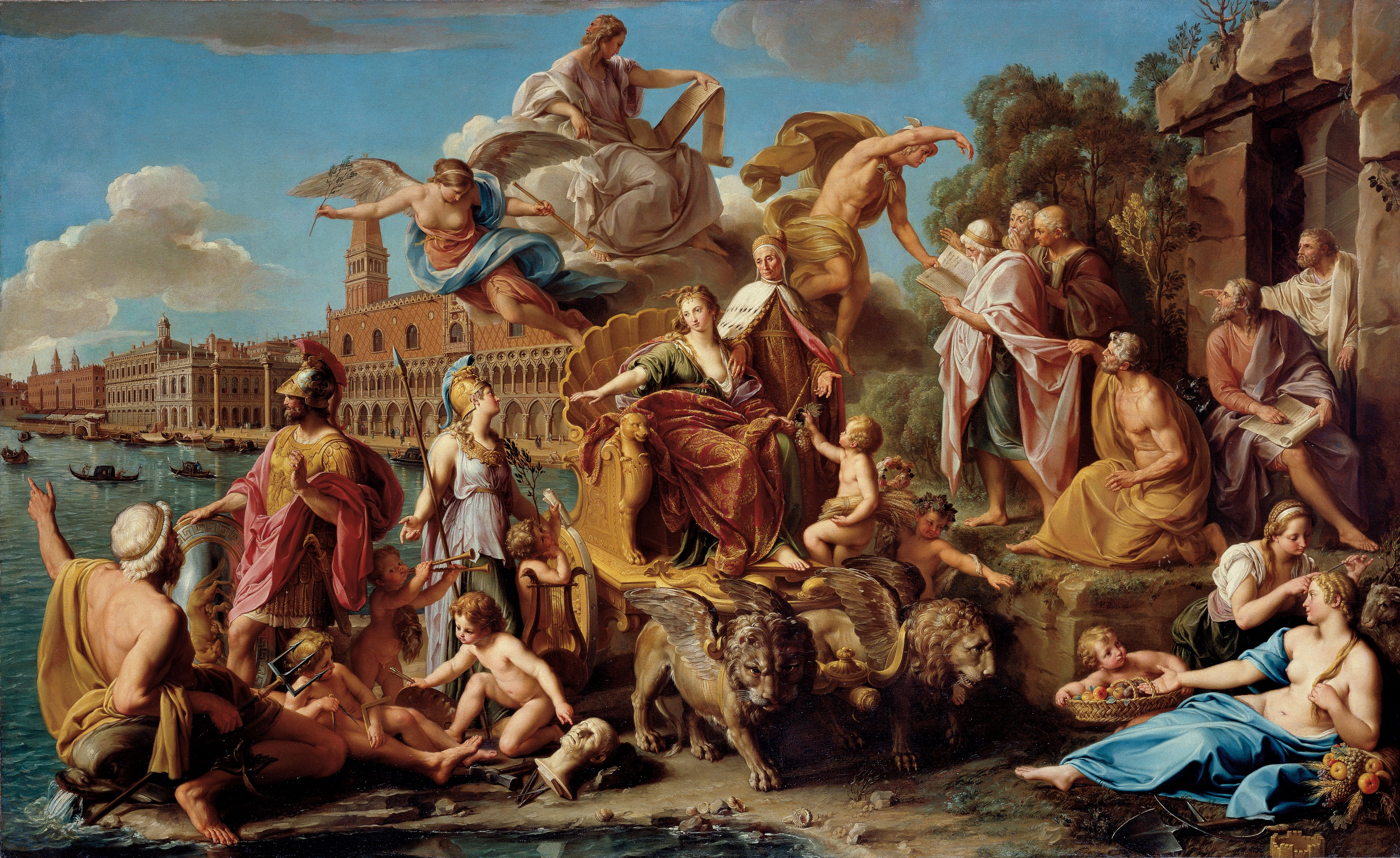
The Triumph of Venice, by Pompeo Batoni, 1737, featuring Doge Leonardo Loredan, North Carolina Museum of Art, Raleigh

=== In sculpture ===
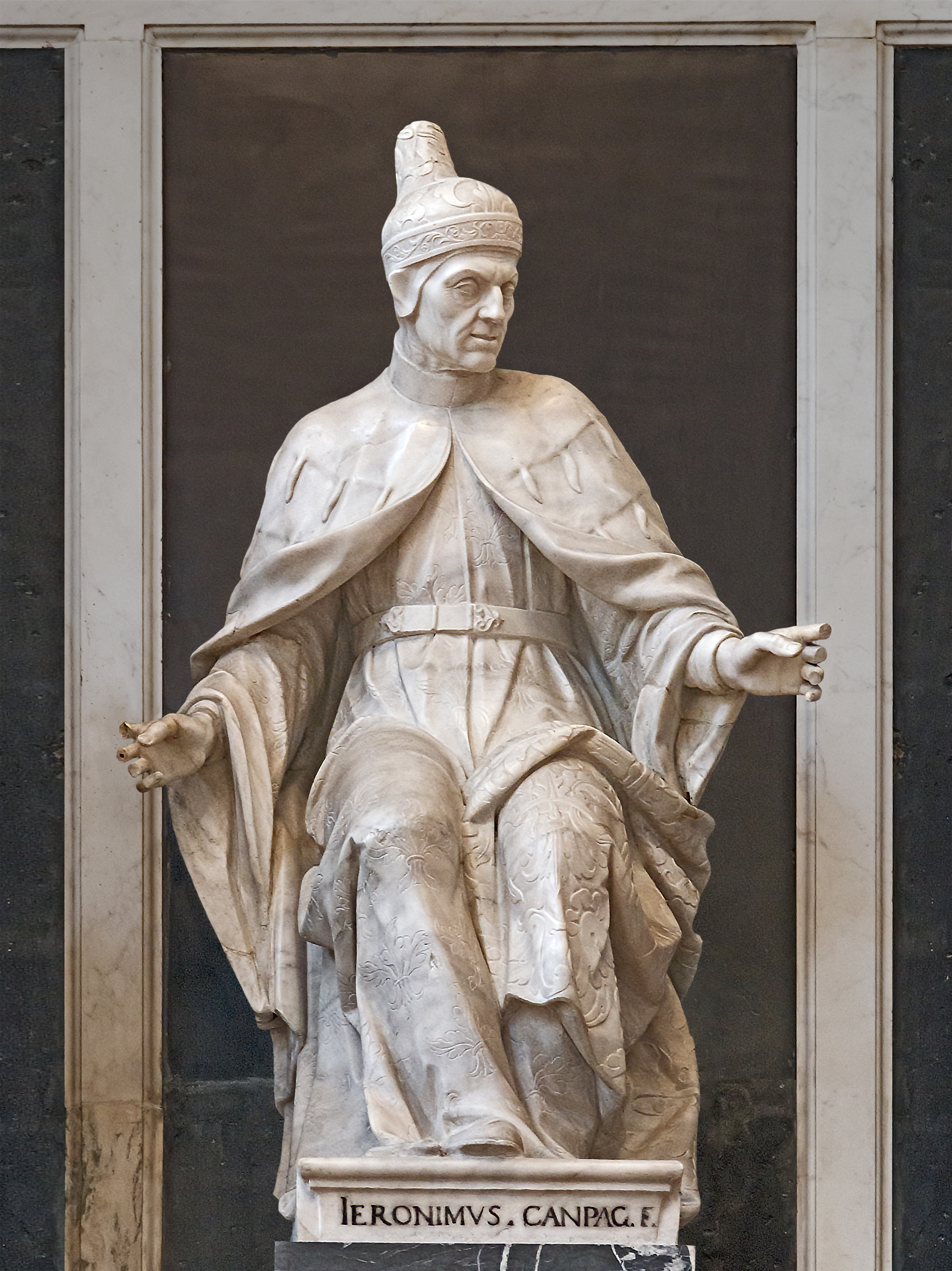
Statue of Doge Leonardo Loredan, by Girolamo Campagna, 1572, Basilica of Santi Giovanni e Paolo, Venice

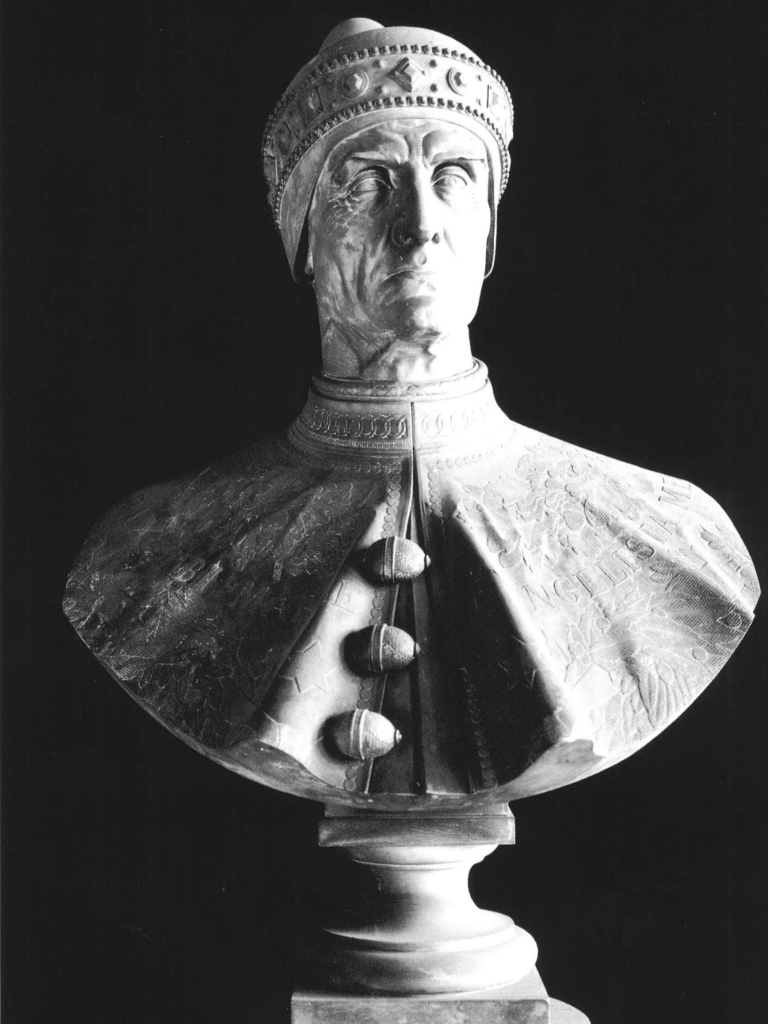
Bust of Doge Leonardo Loredan, Palazzo Loredan in Campo S. Stefano, Venice

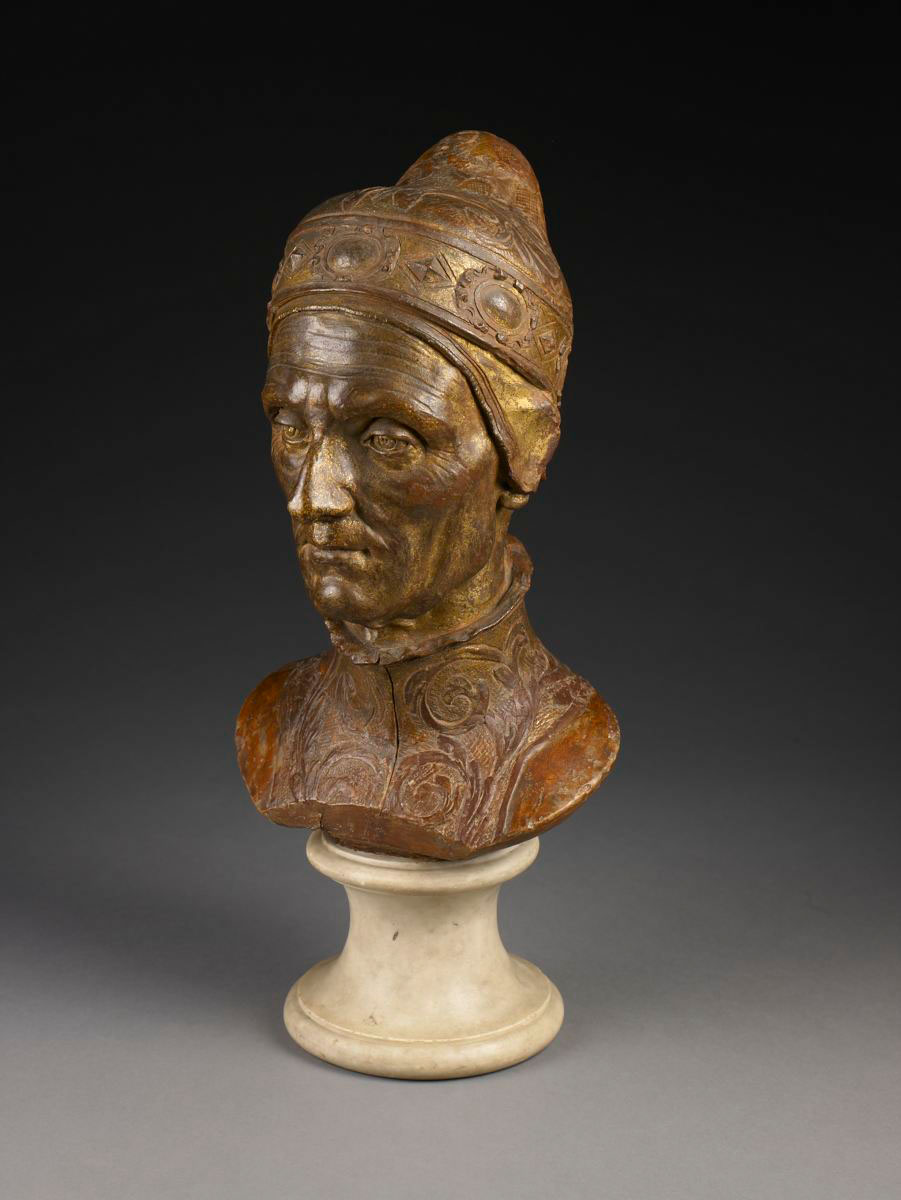
Bust of Doge Leonardo Loredan, by Danese Cattaneo, Birmingham Museum of Art, Birmingham

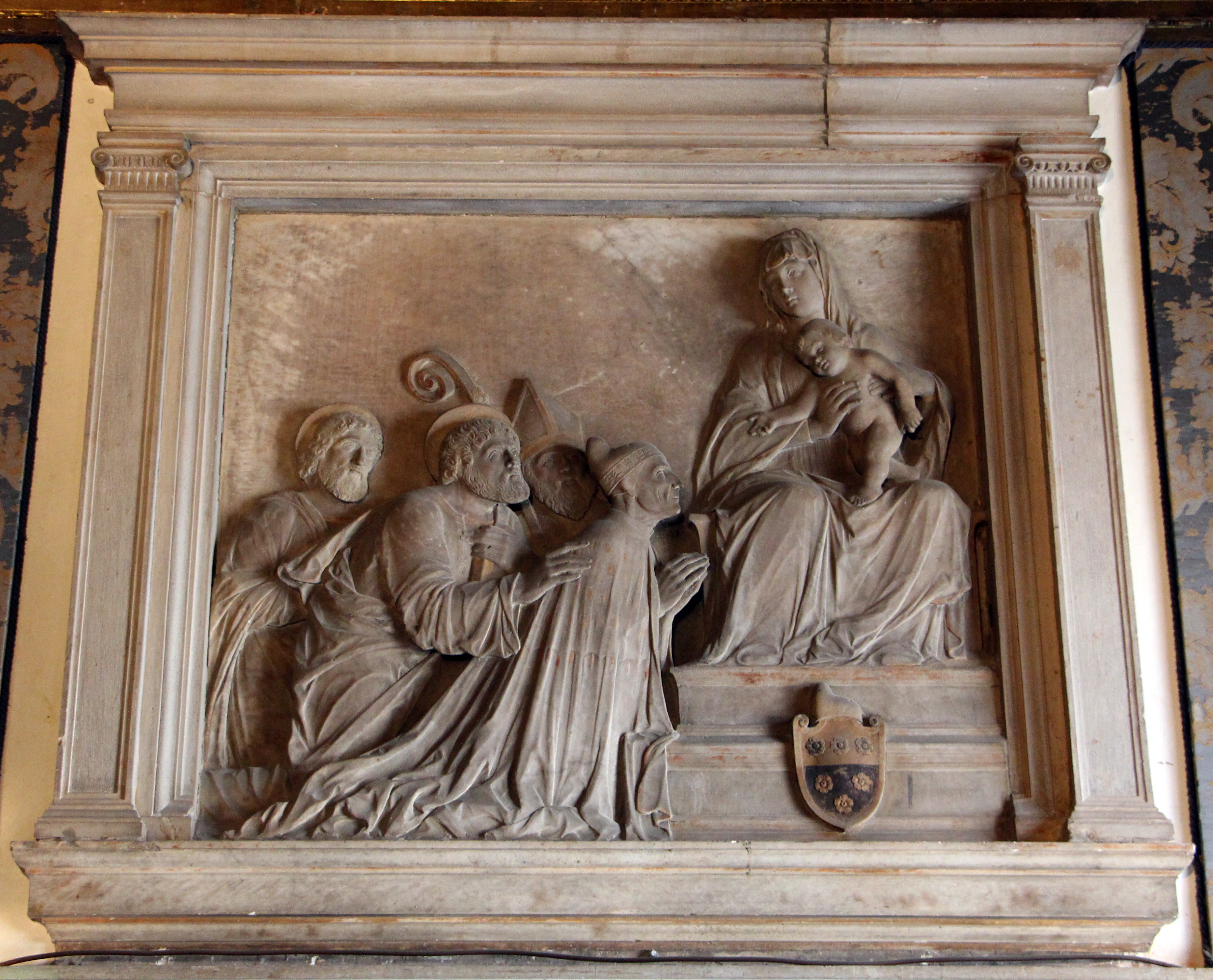
Doge Leonardo Loredan at the Feet of the Virgin with Saints, by Pietro Lombardo, Doge's Palace, Venice

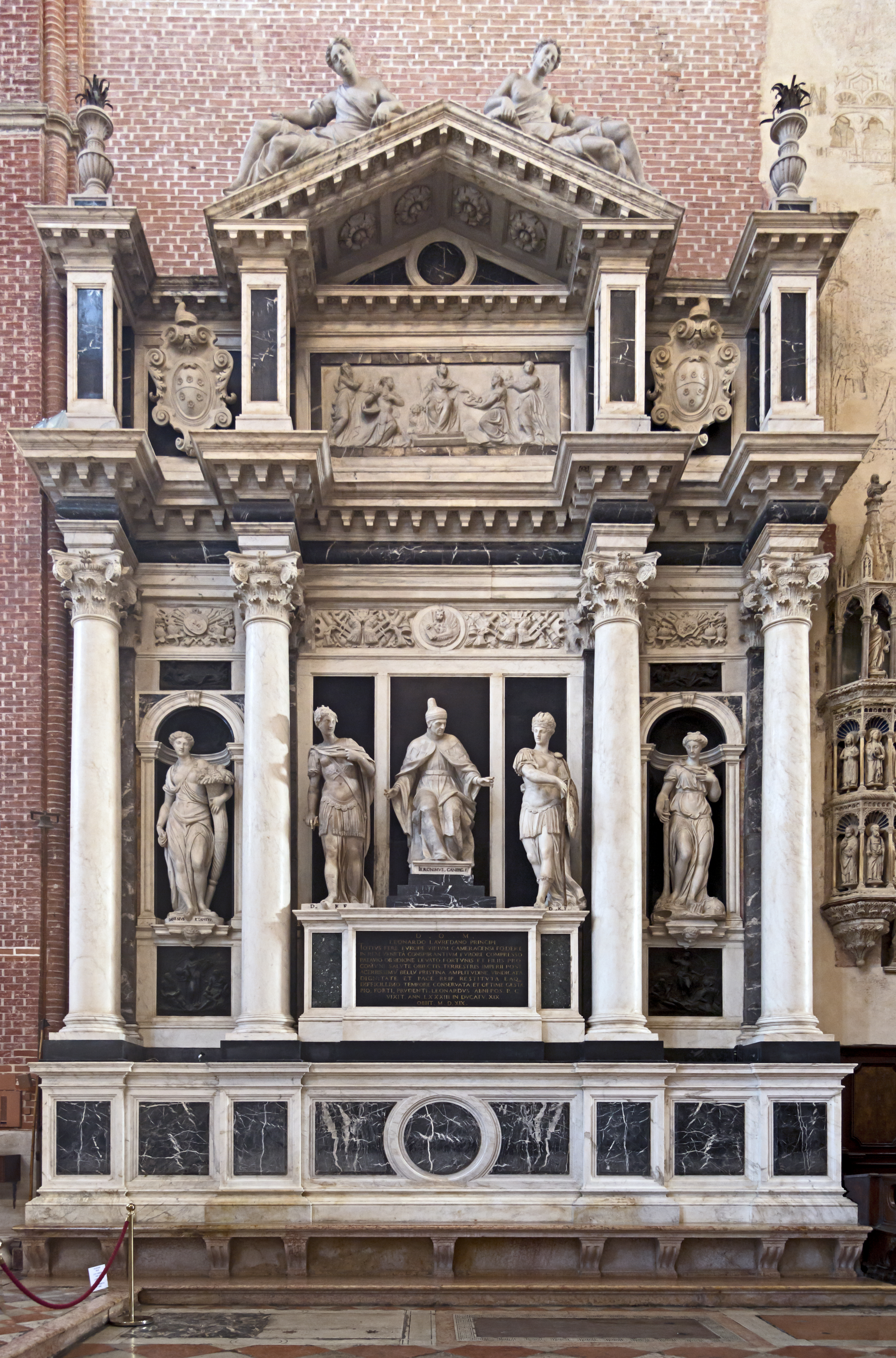
Tomb of Doge Leonardo Loredan, by Girolamo Grapiglia, 1572, Basilica of Santi Giovanni e Paolo, Venice

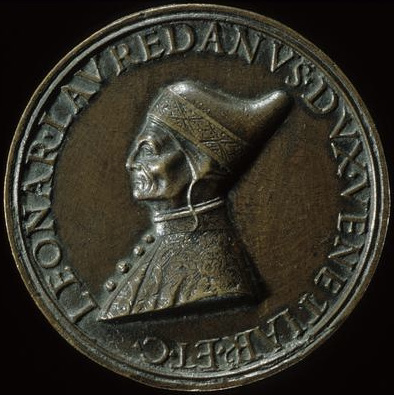
Medal featuring Doge Leonardo Loredan, by Vettor Gambello, 1508, British Museum, London

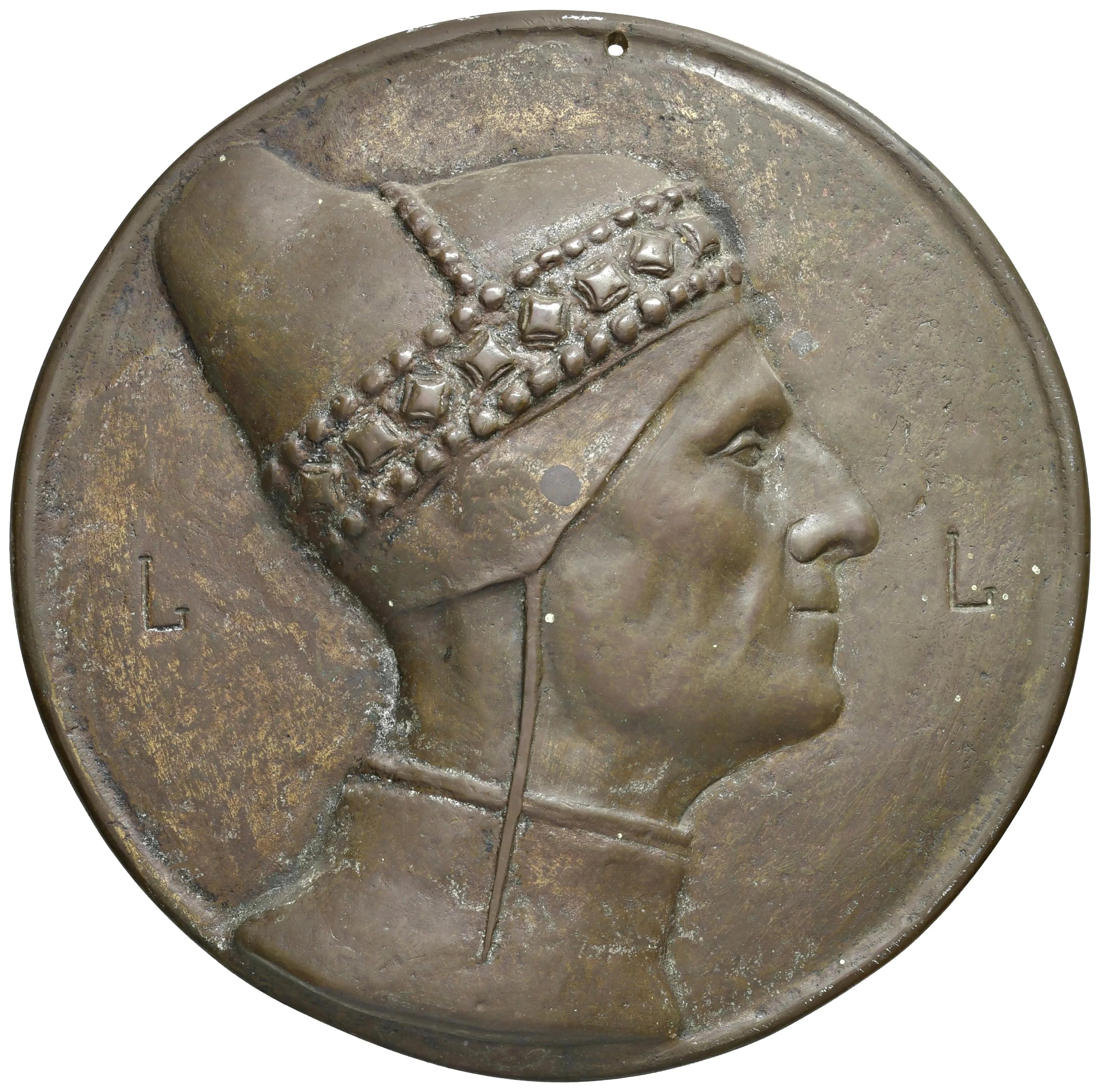
Medal in bronze, 16th century

== See also ==
- History of the Doge's Palace in Venice
- Venetian Dalmatia
- Venetian Albania

== Bibliography ==
- Barzman, Karen-edis (2017). The Limits of Identity: Early Modern Venice, Dalmatia, and the Representation of Difference. Leiden-Boston: Brill.
- Dursteler, Eric, ed. (2013). A Companion to Venetian History, 1400-1797. Leiden-Boston: Brill.
- Mallett, Michael (1984). The Military Organization of a Renaissance State: Venice c. 1400 to 1617. Cambridge: Cambridge University Press.
- Mallett, Michael; Shaw, Christine (2014) [2012]. The Italian Wars 1494-1559: War, State and Society in Early Modern Europe. London and New York: Routledge.
- Norwich, John J. (1982). A History of Venice. New York: Knopf.
- Setton, Kenneth M. (1978). The Papacy and the Levant (1204-1571). Vol. 2. Philadelphia: American Philosophical Society.
- Setton, Kenneth M. (1984). The Papacy and the Levant (1204-1571). Vol. 3. Philadelphia: American Philosophical Society.

Political offices
Preceded by Agostino Barbarigo	Doge of Venice; 1501–1521	Succeeded by Antonio Grimani
