= Panegyric of Leonardo Loredan =

16th c. Latin manuscript

Panegyricus Leonardo Lauredano
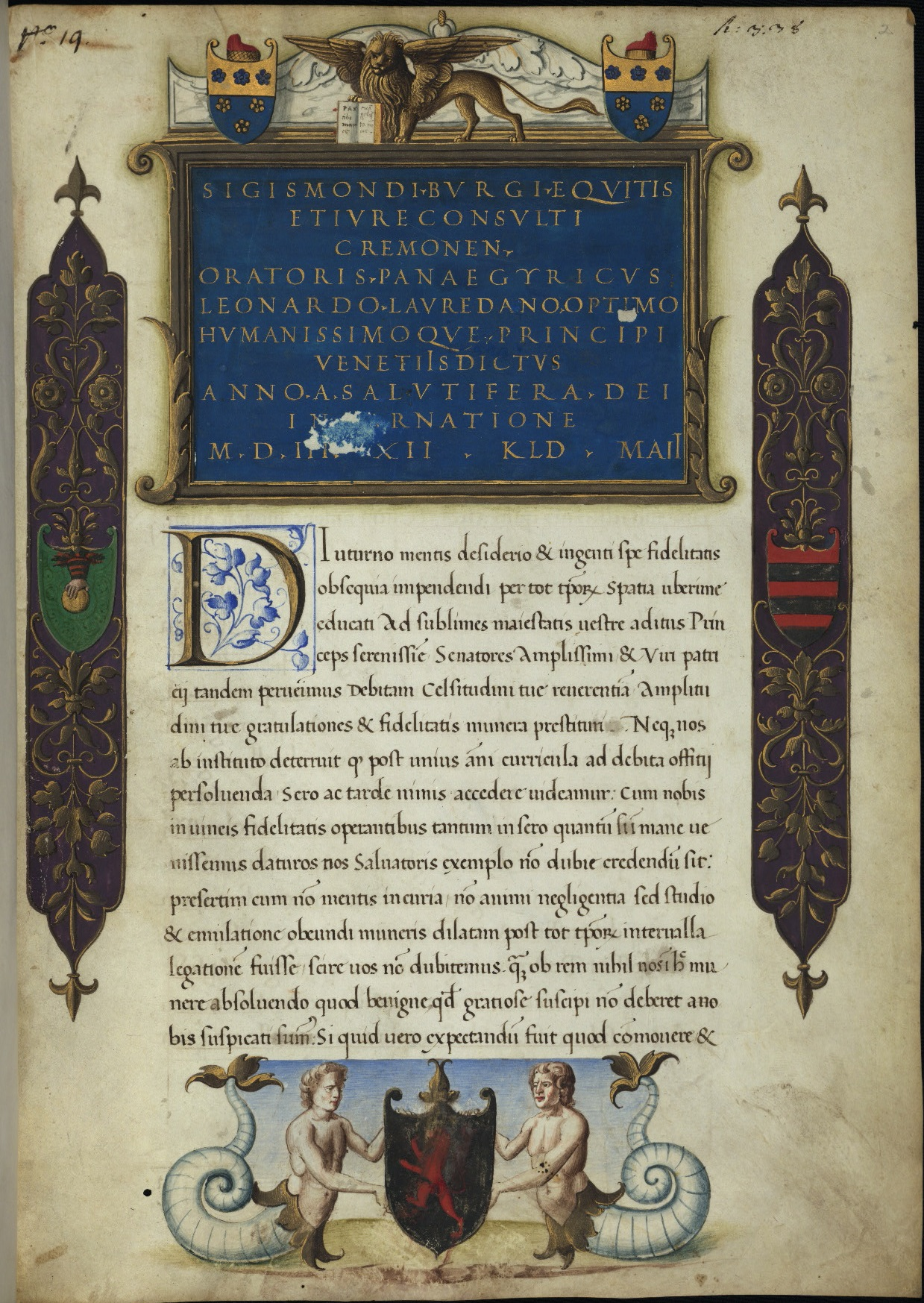
- Title page of the Panegyric
- Author: Sigismundus Burgus
- Language: Latin
- Subject: Leonardo Loredan
- Genre: Panegyric
- Published: 21 April 1503
- Publication place: Republic of Venice
- Pages: 30

The Panegyricus Serenissimo Principi Leonardo Lauredano, anglicised as Panegyric to the Most Serene Prince Leonardo Loredan is an early 16th-century manuscript written in Latin in honour of Leonardo Loredan, who reigned as the 75th Doge of Venice from 1501 until his death in 1521.

The manuscript is a ceremonial facsimile of a panegyric pronounced by Sigismundus Burgus, a knight and lawyer from the city of Cremona. Dated 21 April 1503, the Latin script is elaborately illuminated with a Roman-style inscription of gold letters on a blue background. The placement of the Lion of Saint Mark, a symbol of the Republic of Venice, in the upper margin above the inscription, confirms that the manuscript is an official document. It was acquired in 1931 by the bequest of Henry Walters, and is currently located in the Walters Art Museum in Baltimore, Maryland.

== Description ==
=== Title page ===
The title page contains heraldic borders. The Lion of Saint Mark is visible on a parapet above the inscription written with shell gold, flanked on both sides by the coat of arms of the Loredan family. Two unidentified heraldic crests are located on the left and right margins, on a purple background with gold and grey vines. At the bottom margin, two confronted tritons are holding a heraldic shield. The text is written in black ink, with a four-line initial "D" decorated with blue vines.

=== Binding ===
The manuscript's binding is original. It is made of dark-brown, goat leather, on which the name Francesco Paciotto is written in gold on the outside upper and lower boards respectively.

== Bibliography ==
- De Ricci, Seymour. Census of Medieval and Renaissance Manuscripts in the United States and Canada. Vol. 1. New York: H. W. Wilson Company, 1935, p. 842, no. 488.
- Baltimore Museum of Art. The Greek Tradition in Painting and the Minor Arts: an exhibition sponsored jointly by the Baltimore Museum of Art and the Walters Art Gallery from May 15 through June 25, 1939. Baltimore Museum of Art. 1939, p. 84, cat. no. 113.
- Kristeller, Paul Oskar, and Judith Wardman. Alia itinera III and Italy III: Sweden to Yugoslavia, Utopia, supplement to Italy (A-F). Iter Italicum. 5. London: Warburg Institute, 1990, p. 215.
