= Portrait of Doge Leonardo Loredan (Carpaccio) =

Painting by Vittore Carpaccio

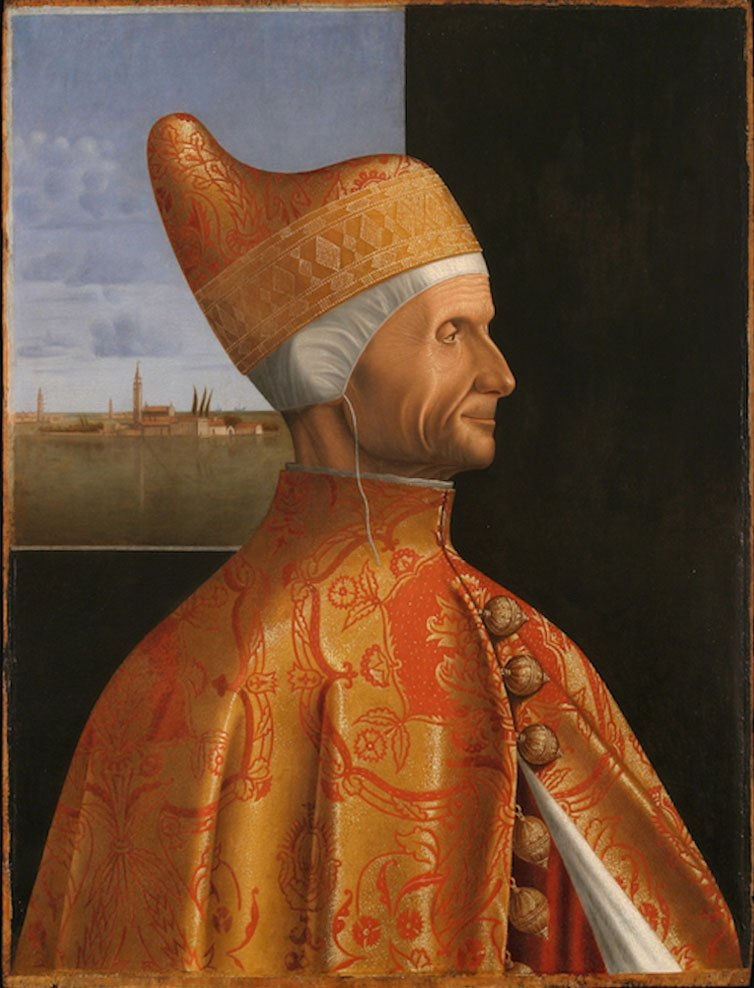
- Artist: Vittore Carpaccio
- Year: c. 1501-1502
- Medium: Oil on wood panel
- Movement: Venetian School, Renaissance
- Subject: Doge Leonardo Loredan
- Dimensions: 67 cm × 51 cm (26.38 in × 20.08 in)
- Condition: restored in 2003
- Location: Museo Correr, Venice

The Portrait of Doge Leonardo Loredan is a painting by the Italian Renaissance master Vittore Carpaccio, a painter of the Venetian School and student of Gentile Bellini. The latter also painted a portrait of Doge Leonardo Loredan. It was most likely painted around 1501/02, at the beginning of Loredan's reign. The painting was restored in 2003 with funding from Mara and Chuck Robinson in honour of Prof. W. R. Rearick, and it is now displayed in the Museo Correr in Venice.

== Description ==
The subject, Doge Leonardo Loredan, who reigned from 1501 to 1521, is portrayed in a sitting position in an interior space, possibly the Doge's Palace. Behind him is a window, through which the church of San Giorgio Maggiore and the bell towers of San Servolo and Sant'Antonio di Castello are visible. The doge is portrayed in his ceremonial garments, including the distinctive corno ducale, a recognisable symbol of the Doge of Venice.

== Conservation ==
Although the work was previously believed to be a 19th-century copy of a lost original, the conservation revealed that it was actually produced at the beginning of the 16th century by Vittore Carpaccio. After removing layers of oxidised varnish, a surface of incredibly high pictorial quality was revealed, and the portrait is now considered to be the first in a series of portraits of Doge Leonardo Loredan. Conservation was completed by Chiara Ceriotti of the ARKE restoration firm.
