= Portrait of the Loredan Family =

Painting by Giovanni Bellini

- Ritratto della famiglia Loredano (Italian)
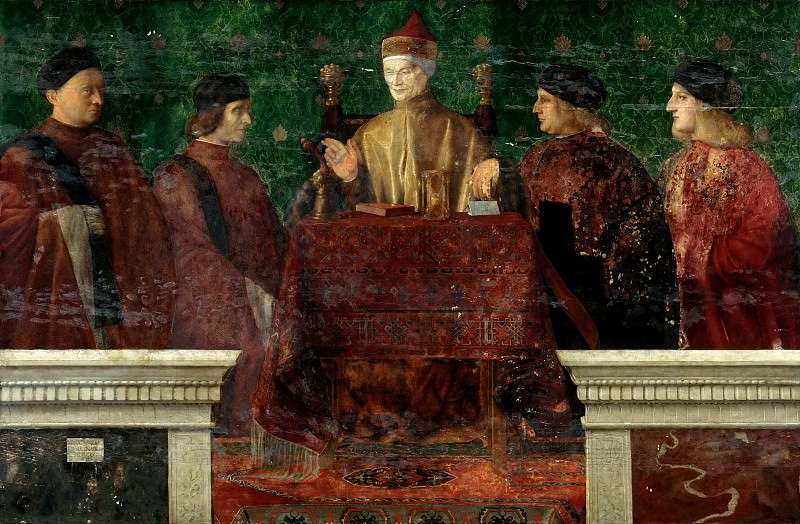
- Artist: Giovanni Bellini
- Year: 1507
- Medium: egg tempera on poplar
- Movement: Renaissance, Venetian School
- Subject: Loredan family
- Dimensions: 134.6 cm × 207.5 cm (53.0 in × 81.7 in)
- Condition: restored
- Location: Gemäldegalerie, Berlin
- Owner: Berlin State Museums
- Website: https://www.mantegnabellini.de/en/discover-the-master/two-masters-two-cities/

Doge Leonardo Loredan with Four Sons, also Portrait of the Loredan Family (Italian: Ritratto della famiglia Loredano), is a large tempera-on-poplar painting by the Italian Renaissance master Giovanni Bellini depicting the noble Loredan family of Venice, namely Leonardo Loredan, Doge of Venice and his four sons, Lorenzo, Girolamo, Alvise, and Bernardo. It was painted in 1507 and is now on display at the Gemäldegalerie, part of the Berlin State Museums.

== Description ==
The large painting depicting Doge Leonardo Loredan and his four sons (the fifth, Vincenzo, died in Tripoli in 1499) initially served as a room decoration, possibly in one of the Loredan palaces, and was severely damaged through time by climate conditions and overpainting. Hence, the original quality of the painting is difficult to fully appreciate today. In the painting, the Doge's sons are portrayed wearing the typical regalia of Venetian noblemen.

== See also ==
- List of works by Giovanni Bellini
