= Portrait of Doge Leonardo Loredan =

Painting by Giovanni Bellini

- Ritratto del doge Leonardo Loredan (Italian)
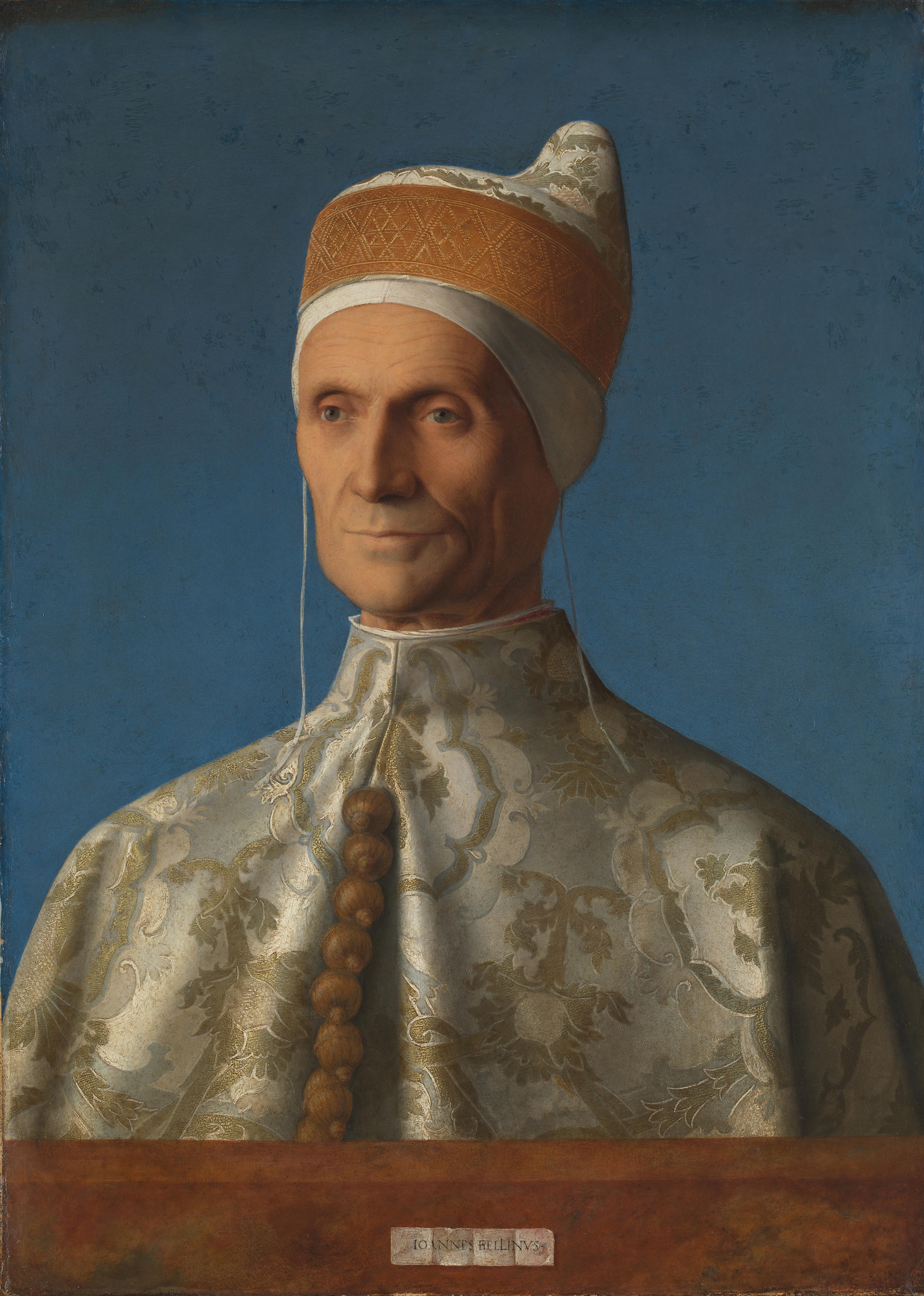
- Artist: Giovanni Bellini
- Year: c. 1501–02
- Medium: Oil on poplar panel
- Movement: High Renaissance
- Subject: Leonardo Loredan
- Dimensions: 61.6 cm × 45.1 cm (24.3 in × 17.8 in)
- Location: National Gallery, London

The Portrait of Doge Leonardo Loredan (Italian: Ritratto del doge Leonardo Loredan) is a painting by Italian Renaissance master Giovanni Bellini, dating from c. 1501–02. It portrays Leonardo Loredan, the Doge of Venice from 1501 to 1521, in his ceremonial garments with the corno ducale worn over a linen cap, and is signed IOANNES BELLINVS on a cartellino ("small paper"). It is on display in the National Gallery in London.

== Description ==
This formal portrait depicts Leonardo Loredan in his official state robes as Doge of Venice, with its ornate buttons. The distinctively shaped hat is derived from the hood of a doublet. As with other traditional portraits of the Doge, the composition resembles a Roman sculpted portrait bust. The painting is signed IOANNES BELLINVS – the Latin form of Giovanni Bellini – on a cartellino attached to a parapet at the base of the composition.

John Pope-Hennessy described Bellini as "by far the greatest fifteenth-century official portraitist", adding that "the tendency towards ideality that impairs his private portraits here stood him in good stead, and enabled him to codify, with unwavering conviction, the official personality".

== Provenance ==
The painting would initially have been in Venice and was probably looted when Napoleon conquered the city. It was bought in 1807 for thirteen guineas by William Thomas Beckford, who in 1844 sold it to the National Gallery for £630 (equivalent to £69,207 in 2025).

== See also ==
- List of works by Giovanni Bellini
