= Danese Cattaneo =

Italian sculptor

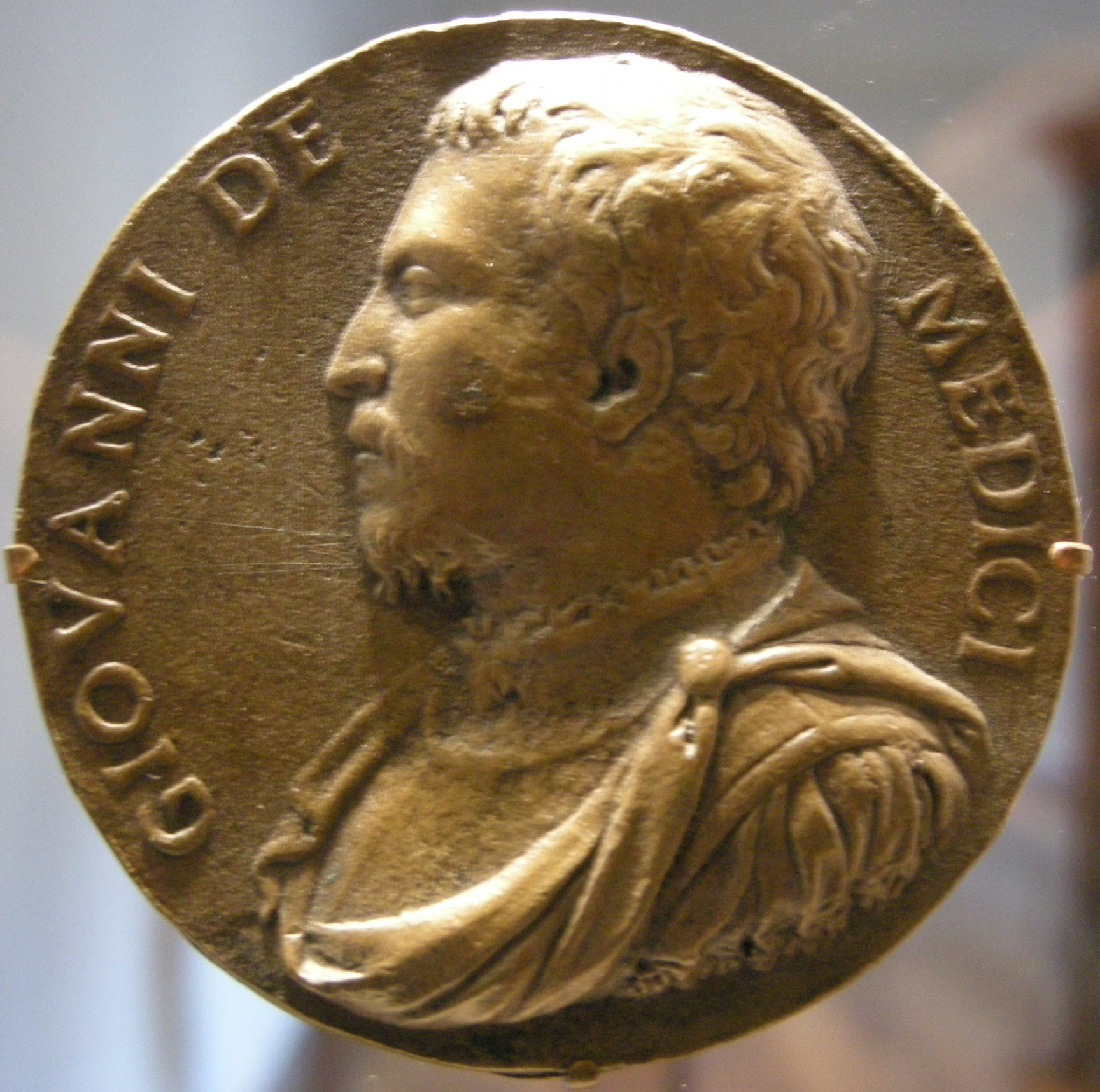
Medal by Danese Cattaneo: profile of Giovanni delle Bande Nere, 1546

Danese Cattaneo (c. 1512? – 1572) was an Italian sculptor and medallist, active mainly in the Veneto region of Italy.

Danese was of Tuscan origin, born in either Massa di Carrara or Colonnata. He produced primarily sculptures of religious and historical subjects and portrait busts. From an early age he was a pupil of Jacopo Sansovino in Rome, and left the city, as Sansovino and many other artists did, after the Sack of Rome (1527).

In Sansovino's circle at Venice, he made a reputation in 1530 with his St Jerome at the base of the organ in San Salvador.

He was invited to Padua in 1533 to take part in the stucco decorations for the Basilica of Saint Anthony of Padua. He also sculpted the sepulchre there of Alessandro Contarini, a Venetian general. Once again in Venice, he was part of the collaborative team providing architectural enrichments for Sansovino's great projects.

In Venice, he sculpted the statue of Apollo over the well in the centre of the court of the Zecca. According to Giorgio Vasari, Danese composed the rich iconographic program himself: Apollo is a young man, sitting on a globe, his head radiant; in the right hand are metal rods, and in the left a sceptre, at the top of which is an eye. A serpent, with its tail in its mouth (ouroboros), encircles the globe.

In the church of Sant'Anastasia of Verona, he sculpted a memorial to Giano Fregoso. He also participated in four statues for Doge Leonardo Loredan's monument in the Church of Santi Giovanni e Paolo.

Giorgio Vasari owed many details of Venetian artists to conversations with Danese in his "Vite". He died in Padua in 1572.
