= Loredan =

Loredan (Venetian: [loɾeˈdaŋ]) is a Venetian surname. The House of Loredan is an aristocratic Venetian family that included various doges of the Republic of Venice, and the surname is almost exclusively associated with the family. The surname most likely originated from the toponym Loreo (a town in the Veneto), which itself originated from its Latin name Lauretum, meaning laurel. Another theory of the origin of the surname, though most likely legendary, is that it comes from the Latin epithet Laureati, given to ancestors of the Loredan family due to their historical glory in ancient Rome and the many victories they achieved in battles. The surname is spelled Loredano (IPA: [loreˈdaːno]) or Loredan in Italian, Lauredano or Lauredanus in Latin, and Lorentano (Λορεντάνο) in Greek, though it is also historically found as Lordas (Λορδᾶς) and Lordano (Λορδάνο). The feminine name Loredana, common in Italy and Romania, was likely inspired by the surname.

Notable people with the surname include:

- Alvise Loredan (1393 – 1466), Venetian admiral and military commander
- Andrea Loredan (1455 – 1499), Venetian admiral
- Andrea Loredan (d. 1513), Venetian nobleman and art collector
- Antonio Loredan (1420 – 1482), Venetian governor and military commander
- Antonio Loredan (1446 – 1514), Venetian politician and ambassador
- Caterina Loredan, Dogaressa of Venice (1521 – 1523)
- Fosco Loredan (d. 1598), Venetian nobleman
- Francesco Loredan (1656 – 1715), Venetian ambassador
- Francesco Loredan (1685 – 1762), 116th Doge of Venice (1752 – 1762)
- Giacomo Loredan (1396 – 1471), Venetian admiral and military commander
- Giorgio Loredan (d. 1475), Venetian admiral, military commander and politician
- Giovanni Loredan (d. 1411), Venetian nobleman and Bishop of Capo d'Istria (1390 – 1411)
- Giovanni Loredan, Lord of Antiparos
- Giovanni Francesco Loredan (1607 – 1661), Venetian writer and politician
- Leonardo Loredan (1436 – 1521), 75th Doge of Venice (1501 – 1521)
- Marco Loredan, Venetian nobleman
- Marco Loredan (1489 – 1557), Venetian nobleman and politician
- Marco Loredan (d. 1577), Venetian nobleman, Bishop of Nona (1554 – 1577) and Archbishop of Zara (1573 – 1577)
- Paolina Loredan, Dogaressa of Venice (1655 – 1656)
- Pietro Loredan (1372 – 1438), Venetian admiral and military commander
- Pietro Loredan (1481 – 1570), 84th Doge of Venice (1567 – 1570)
- Teodoro Loredan Balbi (1745 – 1831), Bishop of Novigrad (1795 – 1831)

== Places ==
- Barchessa Loredan
- Ca' Loredan
- Ca' Loredan Vendramin Calergi
- Palazzo Giustinian Loredan
- Palazzo Loredan a San Cancian
- Palazzo Loredan Cini
- Palazzo Loredan dell'Ambasciatore
- Palazzo Loredan Gheltoff
- Palazzo Loredan in Campo Santo Stefano
- Palazzo Priuli Ruzzini Loredan
- Palazzo Loredan Porcia
- Villa Loredan at Carbonera
- Villa Loredan at Stra
- Villa Loredan Bragadin
- Villa Loredan Grimani
- Villa Loredan Gritti
- Villa Razzolini Loredan
- Villa Spineda Loredan
- Villa Nani Loredan
- Tomb of Doge Leonardo Loredan

== Art ==
Bust of Andrea Loredan, by Antonio Rizzo, 15th century, Museo Correr, Venice

Panegyricus Leonardo Lauredano, by Sigismundus Burgus, 1503, Walters Art Museum, Baltimore

Portrait of Doge Leonardo Loredan, by Giovanni Bellini, 1501, National Gallery, London

Portrait of Doge Leonardo Loredan, by Vittore Carpaccio, 1501, Museo Correr, Venice

Portrait of Doge Pietro Loredan, by Jacopo Tintoretto, 1567, Kimbell Art Museum, Fort Worth

Portrait of the Loredan Family, by Giovanni Bellini, 1507, Gemäldegalerie, Berlin

== Other ==
MV Loredan, auxiliary cruiser of the Italian Royal Navy
Voyage of the Loredan Brothers
Loredan rule in Tinos and Mykonos
