= Palazzo Loredan =

Palazzo Loredan may refer to:

- Palazzo Loredan a San Cancian, palace in Venice, Italy
- Palazzo Loredan dell'Ambasciatore, palace in Venice, Italy
- Palazzo Loredan Cini, palace in Venice, Italy
- Palazzo Loredan Gheltoff, palace in Venice, Italy
- Palazzo Loredan in Campo Santo Stefano, palace in Venice, Italy

== See also ==
- Ca' Loredan
- Loredan
