= House of Carissimi =

Italian noble family associated with Venice, Parma and Refrancore

Carissimi
- Venetian patrician and Italian noble family
- Italian comital coronet above the Carissimi arms (left) and the Vergano–Maggiora gold arms (right)
- Country: Republic of Venice; Duchy of Parma and Piacenza; Kingdom of Italy
- Current region: Venice, Piedmont and Parma
- Earlier spellings: Caresini, Carisini
- Etymology: derived from Latin carissimus (from Proto-Indo-European, keh-, "to love").
- Founded: 1381 (admission to the Venetian nobility)
- Founder: Rafaino Caresini
- Current head: Lester Vergano-Maggiora-Carissimi
- Historic seat: Venice
- Titles: Patrician of Venice; Count of Refrancore; Marquis of Tabiano; Co-Lord of Magliano; Noble of Parma
- Styles: Nobil Homo; Count; Co-Lord; Marquis
- Connected families: Pallavicino, Farnese, Loredan, Landi

The House of Carissimi (formerly Caresini; Latin: de Caresinis) is an Italian noble dynasty of Venetian origin whose earliest documented prominence was in the service of the Republic of Venice. Its founder was a notary, diplomat and chronicler called Rafaino Caresini (c. 1314–1390),who became Grand Chancellor of Venice in 1365 and was admitted to the Venetian patriciate in 1381 after contributing 500 gold ducats during the War of Chioggia. As such he became part of what is called the 'Case nuovissime'.

Rafaino's son Giovanni died in the late 15th century and his other brother had died shortly before. As such, the direct continuous line of succession died with him and didn't carry on to a grandson. The house nevertheless continued collaterally when a cousin succeeded to the family's place in the Great Council, and the surname later evolved in time to become Carissimi. The family is recorded repeatedly in the Annuario della Nobiltà Italiana: in its XXXI edition, part IV, volume III, page 550 and part V, volume IV, page 256; and in its XXXIII edition, part II, volume I, page 1575, under “Carissimi (e Carissimo)”.

This family subsequently moved away from Venice and became well established in Parma, where Angelo Carissimi, a famous relative, was a canon of the basilica and a member of the Accademia degli Innominati. A later member, Alessandro Carissimi, was Bishop of Castro from 1621 until 1631, an orator associated with the Farnese court and a close spiritual companion of Francesca Farnese, a noble woman from the House of Farnese. Further marriages connected the house with the Crivelli, the Maggiora–Vergano, Loredan and Pallavicini families. Through the union with the Maggiora–Vergano family, the Carissimi also inherited the titles of Count of Refrancore and Co-Lord of Magliano.

In the 17th century, the marriage of Camilla Carissimi to Ranuzio Pallavicino, Marquis of Tabiano, created the cadet line conventionally known as Pallavicino Carissimi. Their descendants included Francesco Maria and the marquis Giulio Lucrezio Pallavicino Carissimi, all who were active in Parma.

== Name and origins ==
The earliest securely documented form of the name is Caresini. Rafaino appears in Latin sources under forms including Raphainus, Raphaynus and Raphael de Caresinis. The family's origin was Cremonese rather than Vicentine: Rafaino's father, Enrico di Alberto, was a notary and landowner of the neighbourhood of San Fabiano in Cremona, while a later tradition assigning the family to Vicenza was rejected by Antonio Carile as unfounded.

The form Carissimi was a modernization of the Caresini name which was used by the cousins of Rafaino. The entries in the Annuario della Nobiltà Italiana, including “Carissimi (e Carissimo)”, preserve the later forms of the name without concrete mention of the ancient surname due to the Annuario only collating information of the families inscribed in the Libro d'Oro of the Kingdom of Italy.

== Rafaino Carissimi ==
=== Early life and entry into Venetian service ===
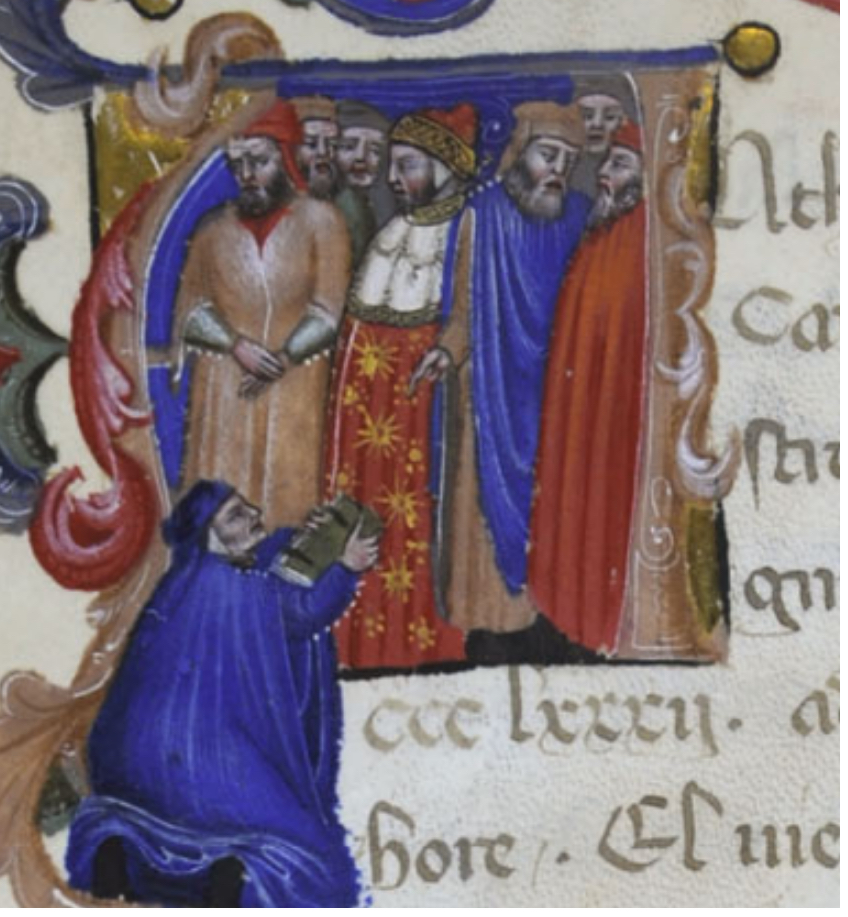
Rafaino Caresini presenting his text to Doge Dandolo

Rafaino was born in 1314, the son of Enrico di Alberto. He was old enough to act as an imperial notary by 14 June 1334, when he described himself in his first recorded text as notarius sacri Palatii. The Caresini were both clients and business partners of the wealthy Paduan banker Enrico Scrovegni. When Scrovegni was exiled, Rafaino and his father followed their him to Venice, where in 1334 they lived in the district of San Maurizio, most likely in Scrovegni's residence. Rafaino, as a notary, drew up Enrico Scrovegni's will in March 1336 and later spent periods at Padua at the behest of Scrovegni's sons. This time spent in Padua may be a reason for Rafaino's hostility to the Carraresi, the ruling house of Padua, an attitude visible both in his diplomacy and in his historical writing.

Rafaino returned to Venice in 1341 and entered the ducal chancery. He was appointed notary to the Council of Forty in 1343, became a ducal scribe by June 1344 and, by 1349, ranked third among the chancery's 21 notaries.

=== Diplomatic career ===
Rafaino's rise was mainly thanks to the help of leading Venetian patricians, in particular the Dandolo family. His duties tended to be intertwined in diplomacy, Venetian finance and in guaranteeing the security of its trade routes. His main operations were:

- In 1348 he accompanied envoys connected with Louis I of Hungary to Naples, and in 1350 he was sent to Mastino II della Scala at Verona to acknowledge the latter's mediation between Venice and Hungary.
- In 1351 he opened peace negotiations with the Visconti at Milan. The negotiations ended in the peace signed by Grand Chancellor Benintendi de' Ravegnani on 1 June 1355. This was quite possibly the most impressive of his diplomatic contributions.
- As notary to the Venetian embassy to Pope Innocent VI in 1353, he delivered 18,000 gold ducats as Venice's contribution to equipping 18 galleys for the war against Genoa. In 1354 he was sent to congratulate Francesco I da Carrara on his appointment as captain-general of the league against Milan.
- Between 1356 and 1360 he undertook repeated missions to Genoa concerning commercial disputes, the integrity of the Venetian gold ducat and a proposed coalition to assist the Byzantine Empire against the Ottomans.
- In 1361 he negotiated at Avignon for the renewal of papal permission allowing Venetian merchants to sail to Alexandria. The concession cost the Signoria 9,000 florins. A mission to the court of Aragon in 1362 was unsuccessful, but subsequent missions took him again to Padua, Genoa, Milan and Avignon.

While at Avignon in 1365, Rafaino learned that he had been chosen to succeed Benintendi de' Ravegnani as Grand Chancellor. He returned to Venice that July and held the office until he became elected into the Grand Council as no patrician could be the Grand Chancellor. The grand chancellorship was the highest office open to a non-patrician citizen and the Chancellor became one of the main foreign policy makers for the Republic.

=== War of Chioggia and admission to the patriciate ===
Due to his old age, Rafaino did not participate in the fighting of the War of Chioggia (1378–1381). He instead contributed 500 gold ducats to the Venetian war effort. In recognition of his service and financial support, he was admitted to the Venetian nobility in 1381, this led to the Carissimi being ennobled for the first time The year 1381 is therefore conventionally treated as the foundation of the Carissimi as a Venetian house and later noble dynasty, rather than the beginning of the family itself. This is also partly due to the lack of documents from the 14th century regarding the family.

The family's Venetian arms, as reported in the Libro d'Oro, are blazoned Or, three pallets azure (Italian: d'oro, a tre pali d'azzurro).

=== Chronicle and historical reputation ===
Alongside his official work, Rafaino wrote a Latin chronicle of Venetian affairs from 1343 to 1388. He presented it as a continuation of the Chronica brevis of Doge Andrea Dandolo, under whom his chancery career had begun. The work developed in stages: its first substantial nucleus concerned the wars with Padua and Genoa, including the War of Chioggia; earlier events from 1343 onward were then prefixed, and accounts of events between 1384 and 1388 were added in Latin and in a shorter vernacular form.

The chronicle is valued as an important near-contemporary record, although its political partiality—especially Rafaino's hostility to Francesco da Carrara—is conspicuous. Carile records 19 surviving manuscripts belonging to several textual families. A 14th-century Venetian-language manuscript in the Biblioteca Marciana (MS It. VII, 770) contains a miniature of Rafaino kneeling before Doge Antonio Venier and presenting his work.

=== Marriages, children and death ===
Rafaino married first Caterina, who died after 19 October 1382. Their son died young, while their daughter married the physician Giovanni Balastro. By his second wife, Beatrice, Rafaino had two sons: Pietro, who married Elisabetta Loredan, and Giovanni. These marriages connected the founder's immediate household with the professional elite of Venice and, through Elisabetta, with the patrician Loredan family.

Rafaino's last known public act was dated 2 October 1389, and the final note written in his own hand is dated 29 August 1390. He died in Venice on 9 September 1390, leaving investments in the Republic's compulsory loans (imprestiti) and rental property in both Venice and Cremona.

== Succession and collateral continuation ==
Neither Pietro nor Rafaino's grandson Giovanni left descendants, and the direct branch ended in the early 15th century. The house continued through a collateral cousin who succeeded to the Caresini place in the Great Council. His descendants adopted the spelling Carissimi and perpetuated the family in Venice and, subsequently, in Parma.

The succession was collateral rather than descent from one of Rafaino's sons. It connects the medieval Caresini of Venice with the early modern Carissimi of Parma and the Papal States. The published entries are found in the XXXI edition of the Annuario, part IV, volume III, page 550 and part V, volume IV, page 256—the latter location appearing twice in the online index—and in the XXXIII edition, part II, volume I, page 1575.

== Parma branch and the Farnese court ==
A Carissimi branch was present in Parma by the later 16th century. Angelo Carissimi, a canon of Parma Cathedral, belonged to the Accademia degli Innominati, the city's leading literary academy, founded in 1574. The academy drew together members of Parma's noble, ecclesiastical and professional elites and was closely connected to the government and cultural patronage of the Farnese dukes. Its members included Duke Ottavio Farnese and his grandson Ranuccio I, as well as prominent writers and courtiers. Angelo's membership therefore places him within the ecclesiastical and cultural networks of Farnese Parma, although it does not by itself demonstrate a blood relationship to the ducal house.

A marriage between a member of the Parma branch and a member of the Crivelli family created a kinship between the two houses. Together with Angelo Carissimi's position in the cathedral chapter and the Innominati, the alliance placed the Parma Carissimi firmly within the city's ecclesiastical, noble and courtly networks.

=== Factional and ecclesiastical networks ===
The Carissimi are documented in Parma well before the establishment of the Farnese duchy. During the 15th century they belonged to the squadra rossa, the urban faction associated with the Rossi family. Letizia Arcangeli identifies the Garimberti, Baiardi, Carissimi, Centoni and Anselmi as the principal agnatic groups represented within the faction. During the conflict of 1482–1483, Ilario Carissimi was both a member of the communal council and chancellor to Guido de' Rossi. In a letter written at Calestano on 6 March 1483, Ilario proposed that Guido employ “due fanti di Marra” (“two infantrymen from Marra”), whom a Rossi partisan had recommended as trustworthy.

Marco Gentile's study of Parma's factional system likewise places the Carissimi among the principal families of the squadra rossa, together with the Baiardi and Garimberti. His analysis of surviving communal council lists shows that all three families were repeatedly represented in civic government.

The family's Rossi allegiance is also documented by the anonymous contemporary Cronica gestorum. During the anti-Rossi violence of 2 March 1477, the house of Bartolomeo Carissimi in the parish of San Biagio was among the properties attacked and looted. The same account lists the house of Giovanni Battista Garimberti and those of several other Rossi partisans among the targets.

Factional allegiance also influenced ecclesiastical appointments. In 1453 Piera, or Petra, Carissimi was elected abbess of the monastery of Sant'Uldarico. Cristina Cecchinelli describes the Carissimi as a pro-Rossi family favoured by Duke Francesco I Sforza, while the unsuccessful candidate, Maria Cantelli, belonged to a family associated with the rival squadra of the da Correggio. Piera and the later abbess Cabrina Carissimi are both included among the religious officeholders connected with the Rossi network.

A later marriage connected the Carissimi with another of the old Rossi-aligned families. The municipal biographical dictionary of Parma records Countess Rosanna Baiardi, who died on 9 March 1734, as the wife of Marquis Pallavicino Carissimi. She also served as vice-prioress of the Compagnia del Sant'Angelo Custode in Parma.

=== Connections with Correggio and Giulio Romano ===
The family's position within Parma's ecclesiastical and artistic networks is documented in the baptismal registers of the Parma Baptistery. On 5 October 1527 Giovan Marco Carissimi, a canon of Parma Cathedral, acted as godfather to Anna Geria, the daughter of the painter Correggio. The register identifies him as “dominus Marcus de Charissimis canonicus”; the other sponsor was Margarita Crivelli. Mary Vaccaro interprets such baptismal sponsorship as the creation of compaternitas, or spiritual co-parenthood, a relationship used in Renaissance Parma to reinforce personal, professional and social alliances. Vaccaro also notes that Giovan Marco had appeared among the cathedral officials named in the contract of 3 November 1522 for Correggio's fresco campaign in Parma Cathedral.

Another member of the family, the canon Pietro Maria Carissimi, acted as an intermediary between the officials of the Steccata and Giulio Romano. On 12 September 1542 Pietro Maria wrote from Mantua that he and the notary Benedetto del Buono had met Giulio and urged him to come to Parma to inspect the frescoes executed by Michelangelo Anselmi from Giulio's design. Carissimi reported that Giulio was then prevented from travelling but might be able to come after a month, adding that he had pressed the artist “quanto ho possuto” (“as much as I could”). Giulio replied on 13 September, acknowledged Carissimi's mediation and promised to seek the necessary permission from his patron. The episode has subsequently been examined by Maddalena Spagnolo in her study of the dispute over the Steccata apse.

Furthermore, by the end of the 16th century, the Carissimi had been recognised as Nobles of Parma.

== Carissimi in Milan and the Sforza court ==
Several members of the Parma Carissimi entered the administration of the Duchy of Milan under the Sforza. The surviving evidence describes Parmesan officials working at Milan rather than establishing a clearly separate hereditary Milanese branch. Antonio Carissimi served as ragioniere generale del ducato, or general accountant of the duchy, and his son Angelo also entered ducal service. Bartolomeo Carissimi became a secret chancellor during the early 1460s and was employed by Francesco I Sforza on diplomatic missions.

Niccolò de' Carissimi, Antonio's brother, obtained Milanese citizenship and became personal chancellor to Francesco's eldest son, Galeazzo Maria Sforza. His correspondence shows that he accompanied the young Galeazzo on diplomatic and ceremonial journeys and reported their progress to Duke Francesco.

On 17 April 1459, while the fifteen-year-old Galeazzo was visiting Florence, Niccolò sent Francesco Sforza a detailed account of the reception offered by Cosimo de' Medici and of the recently constructed Medici Palace. His letter described the palace's rooms, artworks, furnishings and garden, which appeared “not a natural thing, but painted”. Rab Hatfield published and analysed the letter as one of the earliest surviving descriptions of the palace. The letter is also discussed in Daniele Pelosi's study of Galeazzo Maria's artistic patronage and the ducal chapel of Milan Castle.

== Ecclesiastical branch ==
The most prominent early modern churchman of the name was Alessandro Carissimi. Born at Parma during the last quarter of the 16th century, he belonged to a wealthy and respected family whose members had held civic offices. He was educated in the Jesuit schools, where he acquired a strong grounding in Latin literature and rhetoric. He initially married and had children. After the deaths of his wife and several children, he entered the ecclesiastical state; his surviving daughter married Marquis Ranuccio Pallavicini, thereby connecting the Carissimi with the Pallavicino house.

Carissimi studied law under Paolo Tossignano and graduated around 1610. He became a canon of Parma Cathedral and subsequently vicar to the Bishop of Piacenza. He was appointed Bishop of Castro on 15 December 1621 and remained in office until his death in September 1631. His advancement was aided by the favour of Duke Ranuccio I Farnese, and he governed the diocese with a reputation for learning and pastoral zeal. After solemn funeral observances, his remains were transferred to Parma Cathedral. Castro, a Farnese possession in northern Lazio, was then a diocese within the Papal States; the see was suppressed and transferred to Acquapendente after the destruction of Castro in 1649.

As a sacred orator, Alessandro published the 1617 Delle lodi di s. Carlo et s. Francesco, a funeral oration for the Grand Duke of Tuscany in 1622, the elaborate Funebris pompa Serenissimi Ranutii Farnesii in 1625, and an oration for Cardinal Odoardo Farnese delivered and published in 1626. His writings expressed the close attachment of the Carissimi ecclesiastical branch to the Farnese court.

Alessandro maintained a close spiritual friendship with Francesca Farnese (1593–1651), the Poor Clare reformer and founder of the monastery of Santa Maria delle Grazie at Farnese. The monastery's history states that he held her in high esteem, visited her to discuss matters of conscience and seek her counsel, encouraged her reform programme and entrusted her with drafting the community's constitutions. Those constitutions placed the monastery within the Second Order of Saint Francis under the rule of Pope Urban IV; they later received papal confirmation from Pope Urban VIII on 13 July 1638. This relationship linked the Carissimi not by marriage but by ecclesiastical patronage and spiritual collaboration to a prominent woman of the Farnese dynasty.

== Pallavicino–Carissimi branch and Tabiano ==
Coat of Arms of the Pallavicini-Carissimi family

The Pallavicino–Carissimi connection was formed through the marriage of Camilla Carissimi to Ranuzio Pallavicino (c. 1609–1636), Marquis of Tabiano. The biographical entry for Alessandro Carissimi records the alliance from the Carissimi side, stating that his only daughter known to have reached adulthood married Marquis Ranuccio Pallavicini; the Tabiano genealogy identifies Ranuzio's wife as Camilla Carissimi. Ranuzio, the son of Claudio Pallavicino, was a captain of Italian arquebusiers in French service and was killed at Rottofreno on 15 August 1636 during the war in which Louis XIII and the Duke of Parma sought to drive Spanish forces from the Duchy of Milan.

The Marchesato of Tabiano itself predated this marriage. It had been assigned in 1457 to Uberto Pallavicino, a son of Rolando il Magnifico, and remained with the Pallavicino line of Tabiano for three centuries. The Carissimi marriage therefore created a Carissimi-connected line within the pre-existing house of the marquises of Tabiano.

Ranuzio and Camilla's son, Francesco Maria Pallavicino (1 May 1635 – 27 April 1703), succeeded as marquis in 1636. The municipal biographical dictionary of Parma records that Duke Ranuccio Farnese sent him as an envoy to Emperor Leopold I. Francesco Maria's son and successor, Giulio Lucrezio Pallavicino Carissimi—also recorded as Lucrezio Francesco Brunone Pallavicino—was born in Parma on 11 March 1671 and died on 24 November 1746. He was Marquis of Tabiano and served as a chamber knight to Prince Odoardo Farnese. The combined surname is independently recorded in a modern study of the Collegio dei Nobili at Parma, which lists “Giulio Lucrezio Pallavicino Carissimi, March.” among the noble pupils distinguished in dancing.

Giulio Lucrezio married Rosanna Bajardi (or Baiardi), a member of another leading family of Parma's old squadra rossa. Rosanna, who died on 9 March 1734, was vice-prioress of the Compagnia del Sant'Angelo Custode. A local history of Tabiano records that Giulio Lucrezio petitioned the ducal chamber in 1712 to recover possession of the castle. The petition apparently failed; in 1722 he instead leased half of the fortress for 21 years. His brother Odoardo Pallavicino Carissimi occupied the other half, the two households sharing the main gate and courtyard.

Odoardo succeeded Giulio Lucrezio as marquis in 1746. When Odoardo died in 1756 without a direct male heir, the sovereign line of the Pallavicino marquises of Tabiano ended and the fief was incorporated into the ducal chamber of Parma. Giulio Lucrezio's eldest daughter, Ottavia Pallavicino Carissimi (born 12 July 1713), inherited much of her father's property in the absence of sons. Through her marriage into the Landi family, the castle and associated private property later passed to that house, notwithstanding the reversion of the feudal jurisdiction to the duchy. As such, this led to the family enlarging and becoming Pallavicino-Carissimi-Landi.

The historical title attached to this line (Pallavicino-Carissimi, later Landi) was Marquis of Tabiano. The broader designation “Noble of the Marquises of the Stato Pallavicino” is also a title present in other Pallavicino branches, most famously the Pallavicino Clavello and Pallavicino Trivulzio lines.

== Connection with the Maggiora–Vergano family ==
A later marriage united the Carissimi with the Maggiora–Vergano family (also written Vergano–Maggiora) of Refrancore, in the province of Asti. This union is fundamental to the modern succession of the house. The Maggiora–Vergano entry appears in the XXXIII edition of the Annuario della Nobiltà Italiana, part II, volume II, page 13. The line brought to the Carissimi the title of Count of Refrancore. The related Maggiora or Maggiore family of Asti is also recorded as Co-Lords of Magliano (Italian: consignori di Magliano), a dignity which passed with the Maggiora–Vergano succession.

The head of the Carissimi family therefore bears five historic dignities:

- Nobil Homo of Venice, deriving from Rafaino Caresini's admission to the Venetian patriciate in 1381;
- Count of Refrancore, inherited through the Maggiora–Vergano family; and
- Co-Lord of Magliano, inherited from the Asti branch of the Maggiora family.
- Noble of Parma, deriving from the house's time in Parma.
- Marquis of Tabiano, deriving from the connection to the Pallavicino line.

The dignities remain part of the family's historical and genealogical identity. The Fourteenth Transitional and Final Provision of the Constitution of Italy provides that noble titles receive no recognition from the Italian Republic.

== Modern headship ==
'Lester Vergano-Maggiora-Carissimiis the current head of the house. He bears the family dignities of Nobil Homo of the former Republic of Venice, Count of Refrancore, Co-Lord of Magliano, Noble of Parma and Marquis of Tabiano. The first derives from the Caresini admission to the Venetian patriciate; the two Piedmontese titles descend through the Maggiora–Vergano connection and the last two from the fundamental Carissimi period in Parma. Lester Carissimi is an art-dealer working in New York. He married Christian Lapeyre in 2012. The motto of the Lapeyre family is 'Armé pour le roi' (Armed for the king).

== Notable members ==
- Rafaino Caresini (c. 1314–1390), notary, diplomat, historian and Grand Chancellor of Venice; admitted to the Venetian nobility in 1381.
- Bartolomeo Carissimi (fl. 15th century), secret chancellor and diplomat in the service of Francesco I Sforza; his Parma house was looted during the anti-Rossi disorders of 1477.
- Niccolò de' Carissimi (fl. 15th century), Milanese citizen and personal chancellor to Galeazzo Maria Sforza; author of an important 1459 description of the Medici Palace in Florence.
- Ilario Carissimi (fl. 1483), communal councillor of Parma and chancellor to Guido de' Rossi.
- Piera (or Petra) Carissimi (fl. 1453), abbess of Sant'Uldarico and a member of the Carissimi–Rossi ecclesiastical network.
- Giovan Marco Carissimi (fl. 1522–1527), canon of Parma Cathedral, cathedral official and godfather to Correggio's daughter Anna Geria.
- Pietro Maria Carissimi (fl. 1542), canon and intermediary in the correspondence between the Steccata officials and Giulio Romano.
- Angelo Carissimi (fl. late 16th century), canon of Parma Cathedral and member of the Accademia degli Innominati.
- Alessandro Carissimi (died 1631), sacred orator, Bishop of Castro from 1621 to 1631, protégé of Ranuccio I Farnese and ecclesiastical collaborator of Francesca Farnese.
- Camilla Carissimi (fl. early 17th century), wife of Ranuzio Pallavicino, Marquis of Tabiano, and ancestress of the Pallavicino–Carissimi line.
- Francesco Maria Pallavicino Carissimi (1635–1703), son of Ranuzio Pallavicino and Camilla Carissimi, Marquis of Tabiano and ducal envoy to Emperor Leopold I.
- Giulio Lucrezio Pallavicino Carissimi (1671–1746), Marquis of Tabiano, chamber knight to Prince Odoardo Farnese and husband of Rosanna Bajardi.
- Rosanna Bajardi Pallavicino Carissimi (died 1734), wife of Giulio Lucrezio and vice-prioress of the Compagnia del Sant'Angelo Custode at Parma.
- Odoardo Pallavicino Carissimi (died 1756), brother and successor of Giulio Lucrezio and last sovereign Marquis of Tabiano.
- Ottavia Pallavicino Carissimi (born 1713), eldest daughter and principal property heiress of Giulio Lucrezio, through whom the castle passed into the Landi family.

== Heraldry and styles ==
=== Carissimi arms ===
The medieval Venetian arms of the Carissimi are:

Or, three pallets azure.

In Italian blazon, this is d'oro, a tre pali d'azzurro. The title Nobil Homo (often abbreviated N.H.) was the style of male members of the Venetian patriciate due to the lack of the feudal system.

=== Maggiora–Vergano arms ===
The principal Maggiora–Vergano arms, recorded for the family of Refrancore, Asti and Turin, are:

Or, on a fess azure three stars of the field; in chief a sun gules, and in base two lions Or supporting a two-handled bronze vase from which grows a marjoram plant proper.

The Italian blazon is: D'oro, alla fascia d'azzurro, carica di tre stelle del campo, accompagnata in capo da un sole di rosso, in punta da due leoni d'oro, sostenenti un vaso di bronzo, ansato, con una pianta di maggiorana nutrita nel vaso, il tutto al naturale.

An alternative version replaces the gold field with silver:

Argent, on a fess azure three stars Or; in chief a sun gules, and in base two lions Or supporting a two-handled bronze vase from which grows a marjoram plant proper.

Both variants are attributed in the heraldic repertory to Vittorio Spreti. The Refrancore dignity is represented by the comital title, while the associated Asti branch supplies the designation Co-Lord of Magliano.

=== Pallavicino-Carissimi arms ===
The arms of this branch of the Carissimi family are:

"Quarterly: 1st and 4th chequy of nine pieces, five of Or and four of Azure, a chief Or charged with an eagle displayed Sable, crowned of the field (for Pallavicino); 2nd and 3rd Azure, a lion rampant Or, holding a twig of olive Vert (for Carissimi)."

== See also ==
- Rafaino Caresini
- Venetian nobility
- Great Council of Venice
- Duchy of Parma and Piacenza
- House of Farnese
- Pallavicino family
- Marchesato di Tabiano
- Castello di Tabiano
- Stato Pallavicino
- Roman Catholic Diocese of Castro del Lazio
