= Villa Loredan Bragadin =

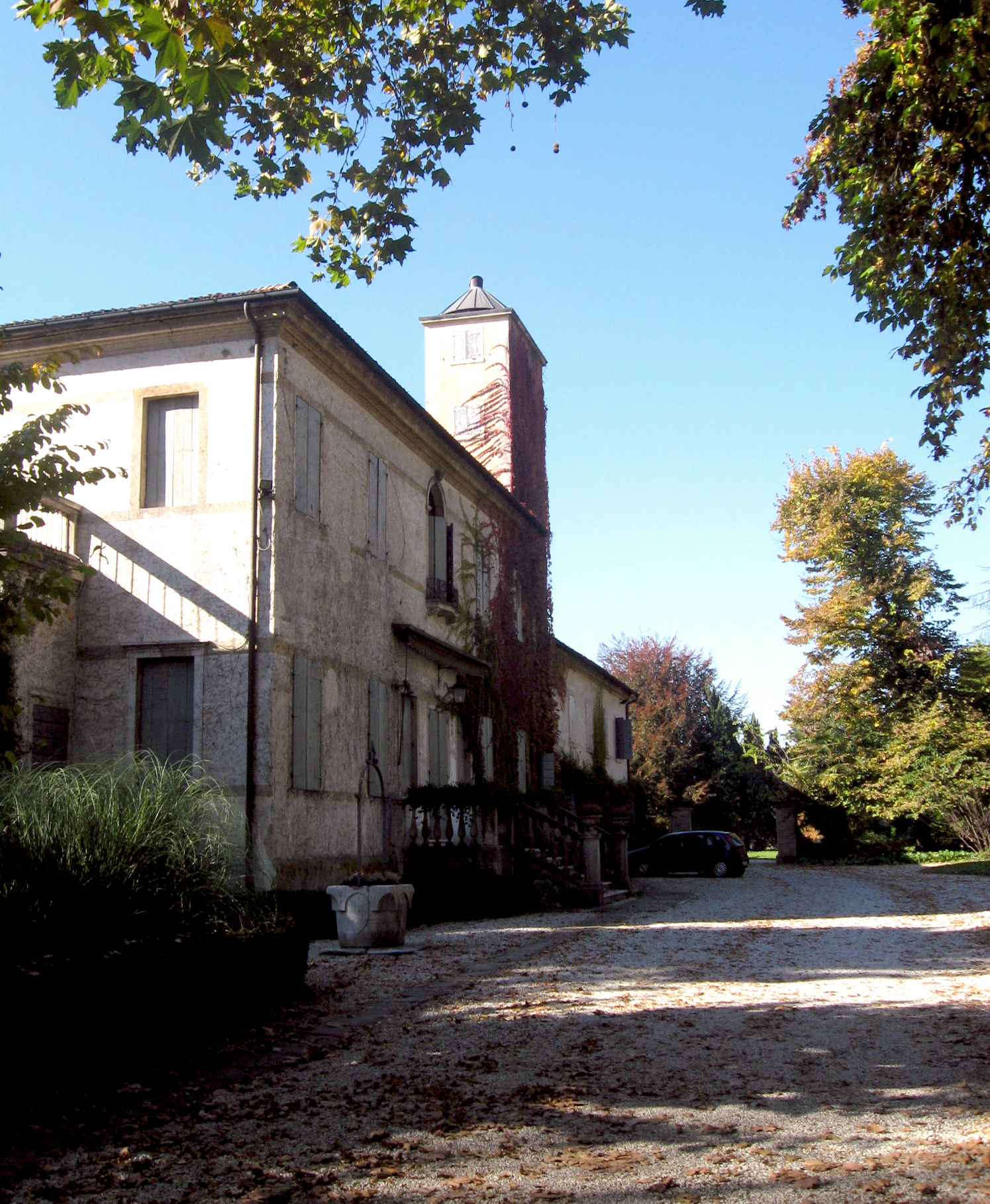
- Interactive map of the Villa Loredan Bragadin area
- Alternative names: Villa Saccomani
- Etymology: after the Loredan and Bragadin families

General information
- Location: Via Roma, 26, Noventa Padovana, Italy
- Completed: 16th century

The Villa Loredan Bragadin is a 16th-century Venetian aristocratic mansion located in Noventa Padovana in the province of Padua, Veneto, northern Italy. It gets its name from the noble Loredan and Bragadin families of Venice.

== Description ==
The villa stands on a pre-existing sixteenth-century building, near the parish church of Noventa. The complex, which is accessed through a gate supported by pillars with a top decoration, is set in a park decorated with statues and is made up of the villa, with the main front overlooking the garden, and some adjoining buildings, leaning against the main body.

A two-story building, raised on a plinth, flanked by a turret. In correspondence with the median axis is the entrance, consisting of an archivolted portal, surmounted by a decorated single-lancet French window.

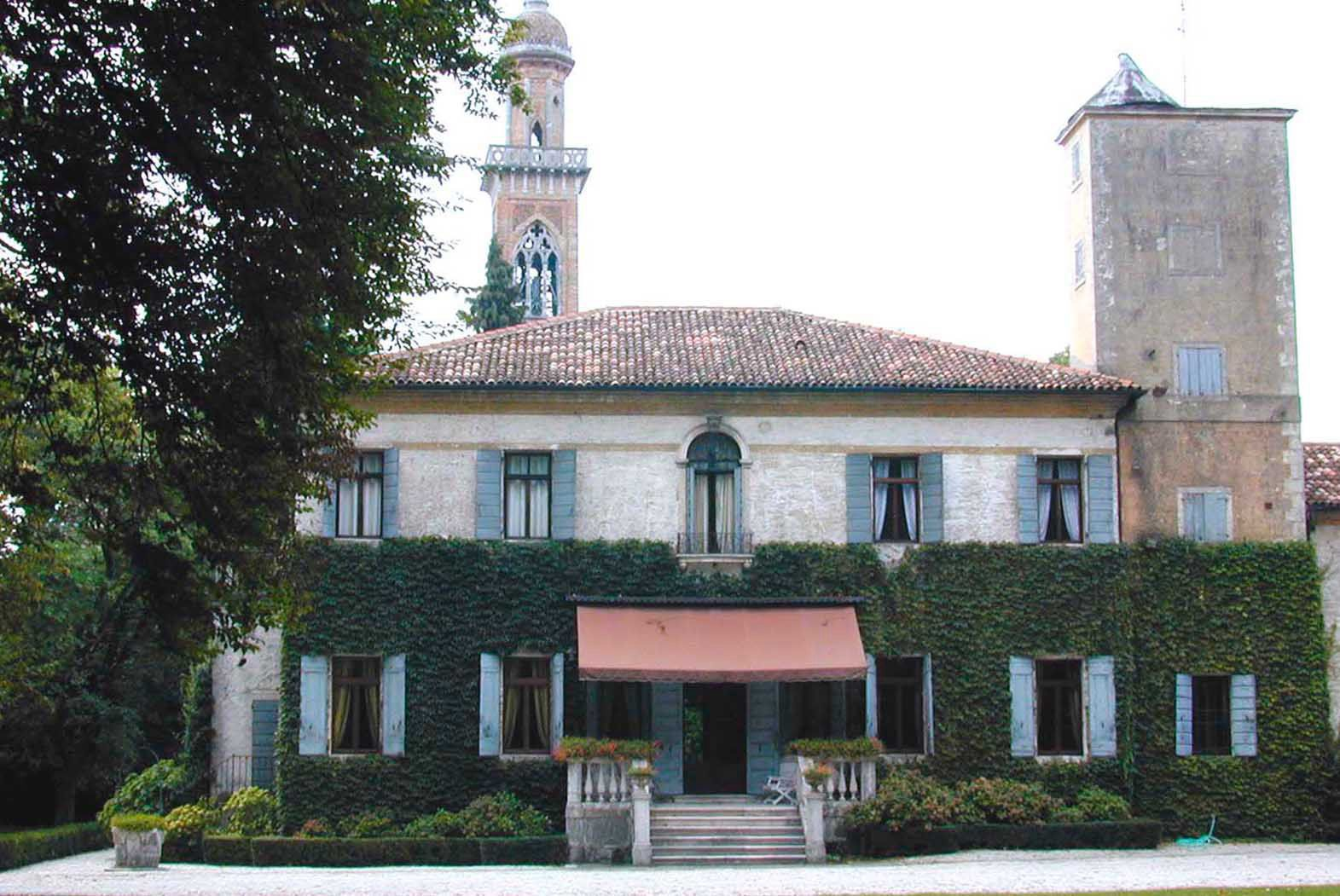

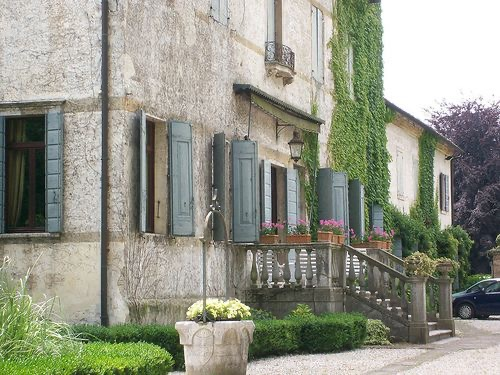

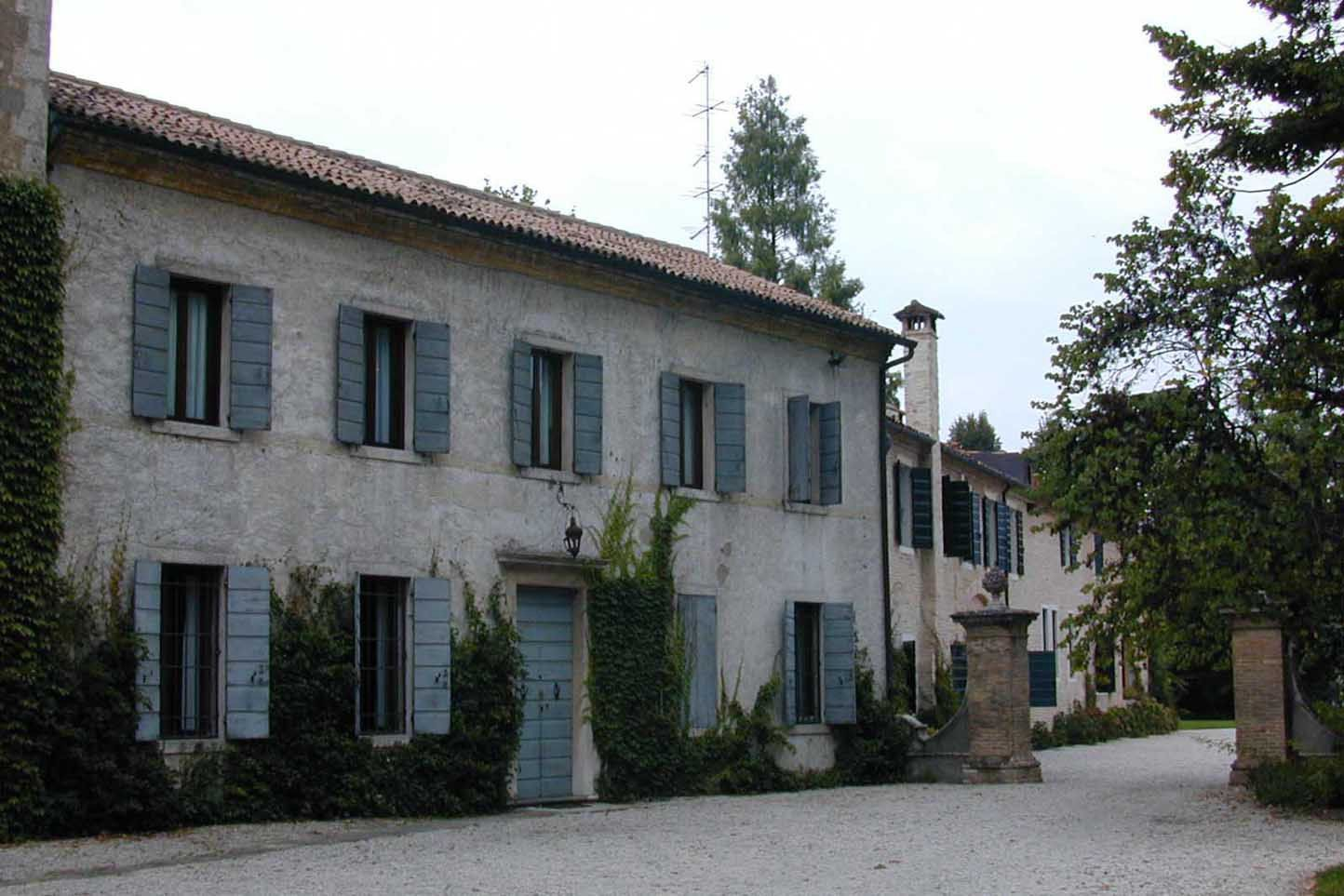
