= Villa Loredan Grimani =

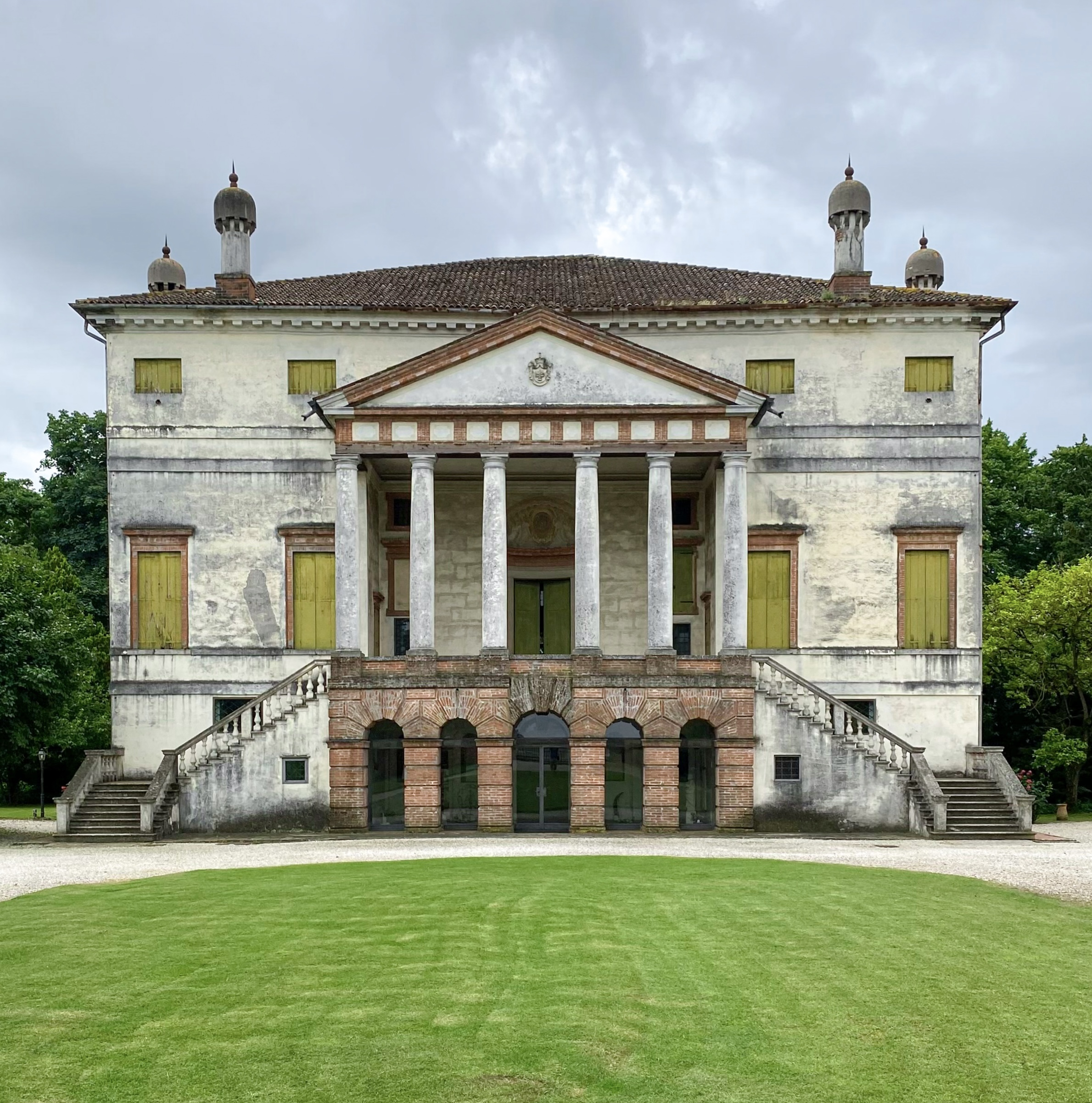
- Interactive map of the Villa Loredan Grimani area
- Etymology: by the Loredan and Grimani families

General information
- Architectural style: Palladian
- Location: Via Zabarella 1, Fratta Polesine, Italy
- Completed: before 1564

Design and construction
- Architects: unknown; possibly Andrea Palladio

The Villa Loredan Grimani Avezzù is a 16th-century patrician mansion located in Fratta Polesine, in the province of Rovigo, Veneto, northern Italy. It is named after the noble Loredan and Grimani families of Venice.

== History ==
=== Historical context ===
The history of the villa unfolds within the broader historical context of the crisis of the 16th century that affected the Republic of Venice, despite its victory in the War of the League of Cambrai led by doge Leonardo Loredan, which concluded with the Treaty of Noyon in 1516.

During this period, the Polesine area of Rovigo comprised three podesterias: Rovigo, Lendinara, and Badia.

Fratta, an important settlement located southwest of Rovigo and the site where the villa would later be built, stood on higher ground compared to the surrounding lands. This advantageous position allowed it to remain unscathed by the great floods of the Po river in the 12th century and the Adige river in 1438. Furthermore, the opening of the Scortico, which directly connected the Adigetto with the Canalbianco and the town centre, made Fratta a crucial transit route, essential not only for communication but also for military strategy.

=== Commissioning and transfers of ownership ===
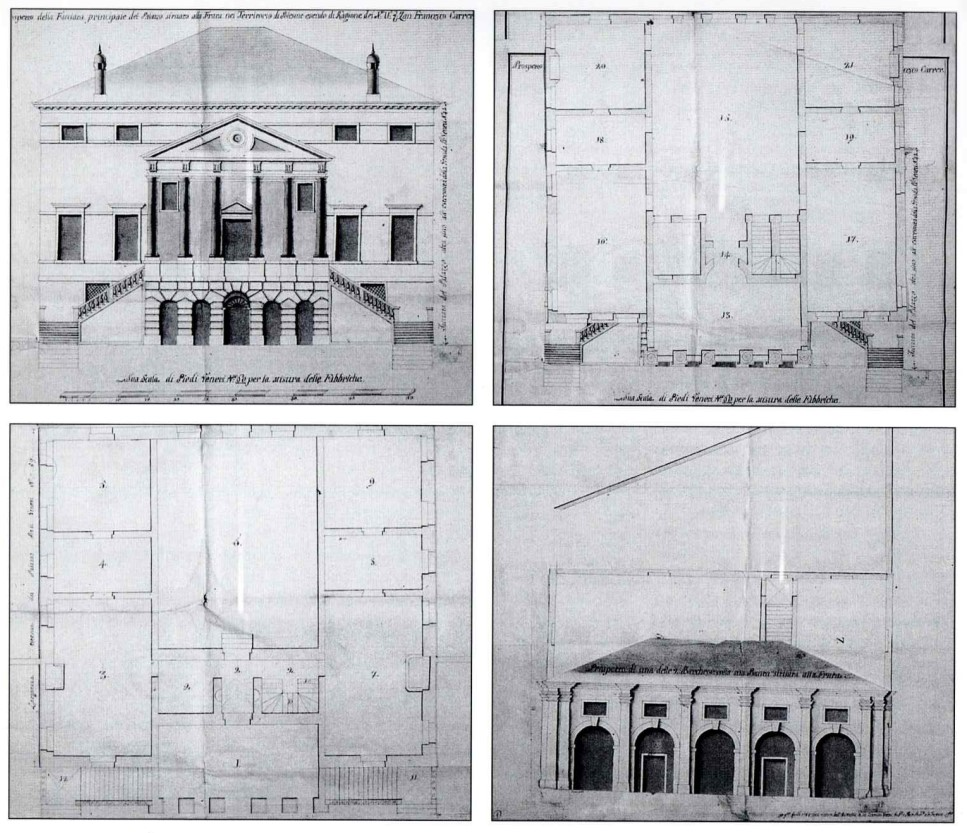
1.1 Giovanni Vettori, Elevation drawing of the "Main Façade" of the villa, with the elevation drawing of the main floor plan next to it (10 April 1784). Copies taken from the original of 1 October 1783. A.S.Pd., Notarial, Acts of Antonio Brusoni, b. 8342, n. 254, details of drawing no. 2/I and 2/II attached, between c. 155 and c. 156.1.2 Ground floor plan of the villa with the elevation drawing of the left barchessa next to it (10 April 1784; 1 March 1784). Copies taken from the original of 1 October 1783. A.S.Pd., Notarial, Acts of Antonio Brusoni, b. 8342, n. 254, details of drawing no. 2/III and 1/I attached, between c. 155 and c. 156.

The owner of the plot of land where the villa would later be built was Giovan Francesco Loredan, a wealthy and powerful Venetian patrician, the second son of Marcantonio and Maria Pisani. In 1511, he married Cornelia, daughter of the Knight and Procurator de Citra Giorgio Cornaro, brother of the famous Catherine Cornaro, the former Queen of Cyprus, who was persuaded to cede her kingdom to Venice.

Throughout his life, Loredan sought to expand his estates to leave a substantial inheritance for his four children: Giorgio, Marietta, Lucietta, and Lucrezia. Among his properties was the Vespara estate, where a permanent structure was built, identified as a Loredan residence, a casa dominicale (manorial house) used for managing, organising, and overseeing the family's holdings in Polesine.

Upon Gian Francesco Loredan’s death, his inheritance passed to his only son, Giorgio, who decided to follow in his father’s footsteps in investment policy. Giorgio Loredan maintained a close friendship with Gian Francesco Badoer, who, on 2 December 1536, married Lucia Loredan. This alliance between the two families was symbolised by the presence of the Loredan-Badoer coat of arms at the entrance of the nearby Villa Badoer (which was later replaced by that of the Mocenigo family).

As for Gian Francesco Loredan's youngest daughter Lucrezia, in 1529, at the age of two, she was betrothed to Vincenzo Grimani, who was four years old at the time. The arrangement was made by their respective guardians, who had taken custody of them following the death of Lucrezia's father in 1527. On 18 January 1541, they were married in the Church of San Biagio di Cataldo. Lucrezia would go on to play a significant role in the renovation of the villa and its fresco cycle, serving as its primary muse and inspiration.

On 6 October 1539, Giorgio Loredan died, leaving behind a substantial estate that included several properties in the Venetian, Paduan, and Polesine regions, as recorded in the tax declaration (polizza d’estimo) of 1537, presented on 30 April 1538. Due to the lack of direct heirs, his inheritance initially passed to his wife and was later divided—under the supervision of a notary—among his sisters and their respective husbands. The Loredan villa was inherited by them as undivided property.

From the marriage of Vincenzo and Lucrezia, four daughters were born: Isabetta, Cornelia, Adriana, and Paola. On 23 September 1556, Lucrezia died in Fratta, bringing an end to any further improvements to the villa. After Vincenzo’s death, the villa passed to their four daughters, who divided it among themselves between 1579 and 1580.

After Isabetta became a widow, the issue of dividing the villa's ownership remained unresolved. The matter was settled by drawing lots among the sisters Cornelia, Adriana, and Isabetta. This took place in the Grimani palace in Sant'Agnese, Venice, in the presence of the notary Girolamo Savina. Once the lots were drawn, the villa remained jointly owned by Isabetta and Adriana, while Cornelia received only land assets.

After Isabetta’s death, her son Vincenzo Molin found the shared ownership of the property with his aunt Adriana to be impractical. With the help of a public surveyor, he sought to physically divide the estate. On 26 March 1615, the villa became the sole property of the Molin family, remaining in their possession until 1748. During this period, Antonio, a great-grandson of Vincenzo, who had been entrusted with the estate, died without male heirs. As a result, he decided to bequeath the fabbrica (the villa) to his nephew Zuan Francesco Correr, who, however, was not interested in inheriting it.

In 1818, the villa was purchased by Giuseppe di Sebastiano Monti. Throughout the 19th and 20th centuries, it changed hands several times, passing through the Berti, Emo, and Bragadin families. Since 1970, the villa has belonged to the Avezzù Pignatelli di Montecalvo family.

=== Dating and restorations ===
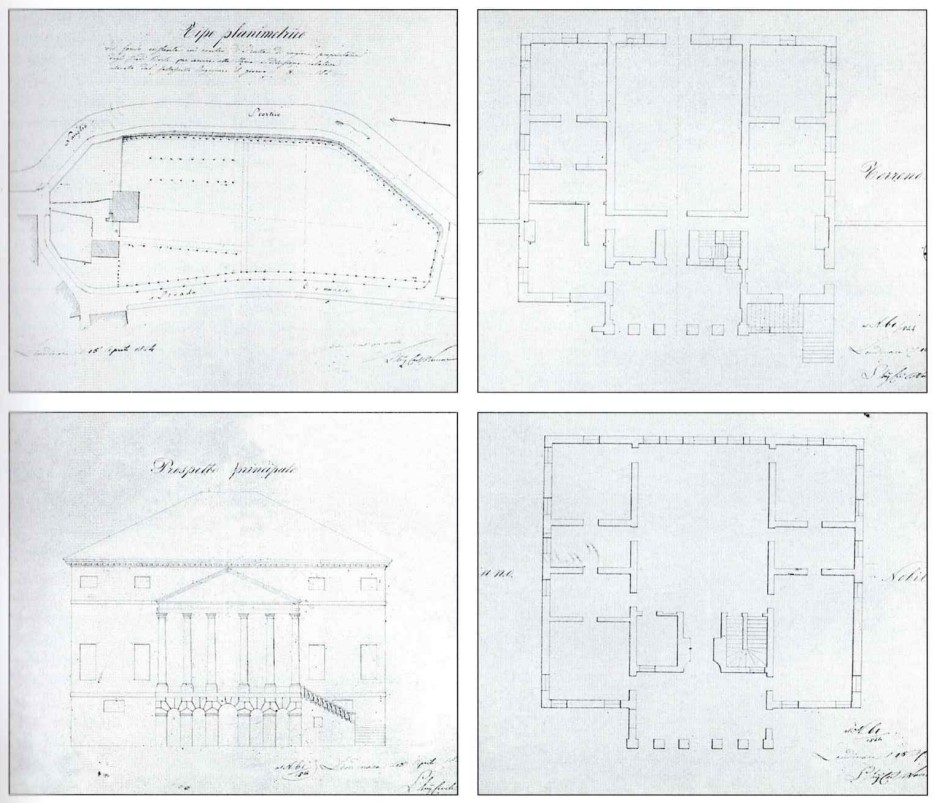
1.1 Francesco Vaccari, General plan of the estate belonging to the heirs in Fratta, with the ground floor elevation of the villa next to it (Lendinara, 15 April 1844). A.S.Ve., Notarial, Acts of Notary Antonio Santibusca, series II, b. 1095, lett. d,f. A IX and lett. d,f. C XI.1.2 Elevation of the main facade of the villa belonging to the heirs, with the elevation of the main floor plan next to it (Lendinara, 15 April 1844). A.S.Ve., Notarial, Acts of Notary Antonio Santibusca, series II, b. 1095, lett. d,f. B X and lett. d,f. D XII.

The Villa Loredan Grimani is the result of a renovation that incorporated a significant pre-existing structure within the complex. However, no documents definitively confirm the exact date of its construction. Scholars estimate that work on the villa began between 1549 and 1556-1557, coinciding with the death of Lucrezia Loredan and the second marriage of Vincenzo Grimani.

The Venice State Archives hold two maps, dated 1549 and 1557, depicting the Fratta Polesine area. A comparison of these maps reveals a radical transformation of the plot where the villa stands: the first map shows smaller buildings scattered across the land, while the second presents a dominant structure, complete with sketches of two massive chimneys and smaller adjacent buildings. However, this may not be an entirely accurate representation of Vincenzo Grimani’s renovated estate.

Also preserved in the Venice State Archives is a map dated 21 April 1564, which faithfully depicts Villa Loredan Grimani. The villa is oriented northward and flanked by two symmetrical, perpendicular barchesse (rural outbuildings).

Since the frescoes were left unfinished, it can be inferred that the villa was completed around 1555-1556.

By 1844, as recorded in a site plan by Francesco Vaccari, the eastern barchessa had already been demolished.

A 1783 survey shows that only the right-hand entrance staircase had been built at the time, while the left staircase was not added until 1970-1971.

=== Architectural attribution ===
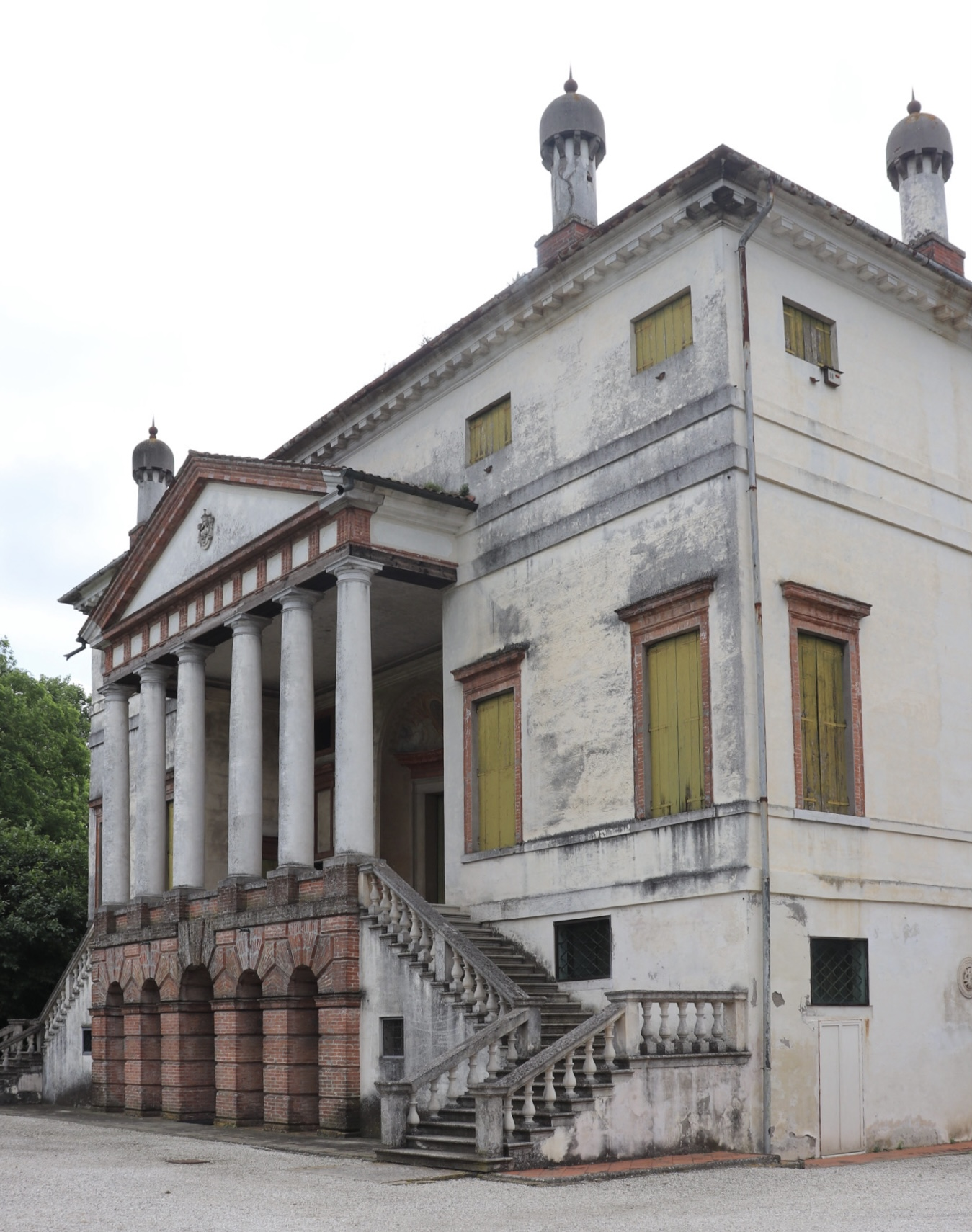
Loggia of the manor house

The attribution of the villa’s design remains uncertain due to the lack of documents and direct evidence. Glauco Benito Tiozzo is the only scholar to support the authenticity of Palladio’s authorship, a claim that had also been made in the 18th century by Giovanni Vettori of Venice, an architect and public expert on fortifications.

On the other hand, some argue that the villa is not a direct work of Palladio but rather a crude and inaccurate imitation of his style. Nevertheless, architectural historians such as Lionello Puppi and Donata Battilotti do not entirely rule out Palladio’s indirect involvement. They suggest that he may have provided a design that was then executed by a construction site overseer.

The villa does exhibit features associated with Palladian architecture, such as the six-column pronaos topped with a pediment. However, numerous elements diverge from his style—particularly from Villa Foscari (Malcontenta)—raising doubts about his direct authorship.

Observing the pediment atop the colonnade of the main building, one can notice that it features a sharp edge ending with a horizontal wing. This elongated corner detail was typically used by Michele Sanmicheli; in fact, it can also be seen in the Petrucci Chapel in Orvieto and the Pellegrini Chapel in San Bernardino. However, a similar element appears in Porta Giulia, a structure designed by the architect Giulio Romano.

Additional architectural features, such as the concave portal and the barchessa, also suggest a connection to Giulio Romano. The concave portal is reminiscent of the Loggia dei Marmi in the Ducal Palace of Mantua, while the barchessa finds a precedent in the Palazzo Te.

As for the spatial and floor plan design of the villa, it has been linked to the Odeo Cornaro in Padua, designed by the architect Giovanni Maria Falconetto. This structure is considered a fundamental model that anticipates similar architectural concepts.

== Description ==
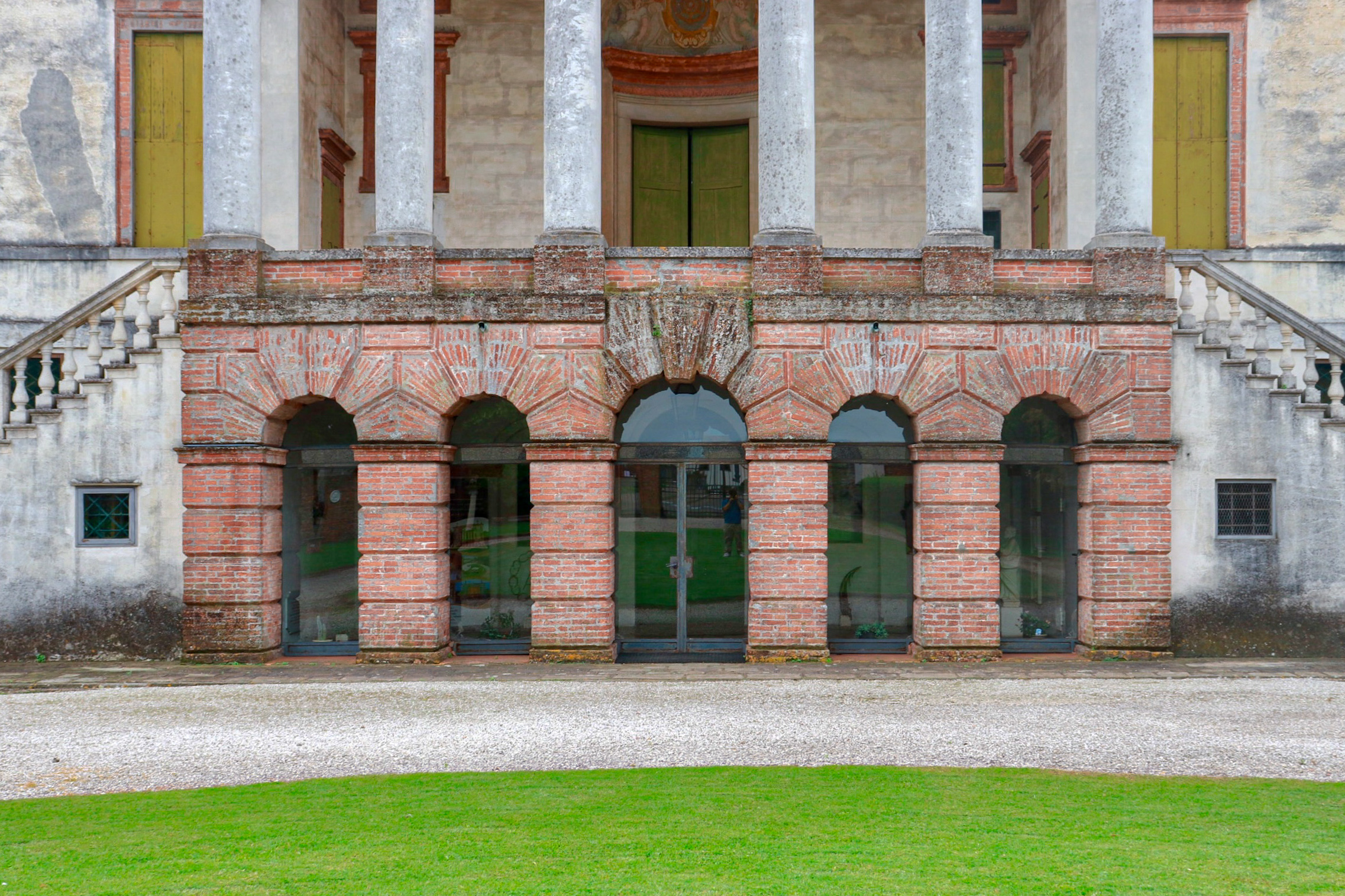
The base of the loggia

Some elements of the façade recall the Villa Foscari (“La Malcontenta”) in Fusina and the unfinished Villa Da Porto.

In Vettori’s drawing, two barchesse are depicted symmetrically on either side of the villa’s central structure. However, today only the western barchessa remains.

The villa’s north-facing façade aspires to embody Palladio’s concept of the villa-tempio (villa-temple), featuring a hexastyle pronaos preceded by a loggia with a pediment supported by six Doric columns. This loggia rests on a portico composed of five elongated arches framed by rusticated stonework. As seen in other Renaissance buildings, the villa’s pronaos appears slightly detached from the main structure.

The entablature, aligned with the columns, features a continuous series of triglyphs that reinforce the verticality of the central body. This is contrasted by the horizontal elements across the rest of the façade, including the brackets above the windows of the piano nobile, the cornice marcapiano (a string course marking the division between the ground floor and the piano nobile), and additional parallel lines encircling the building. One line corresponds to the architrave of the piano nobile windows, while two others frame the height of the attic’s small windows. These elements, along with the window moldings, create a geometric interplay of light and shadow, reflecting the simplicity and balance characteristic of High Renaissance architecture.

Access to the loggia from the garden is provided by a side staircase with two ramps. From the loggia, the building is accessed through a frescoed exedra.

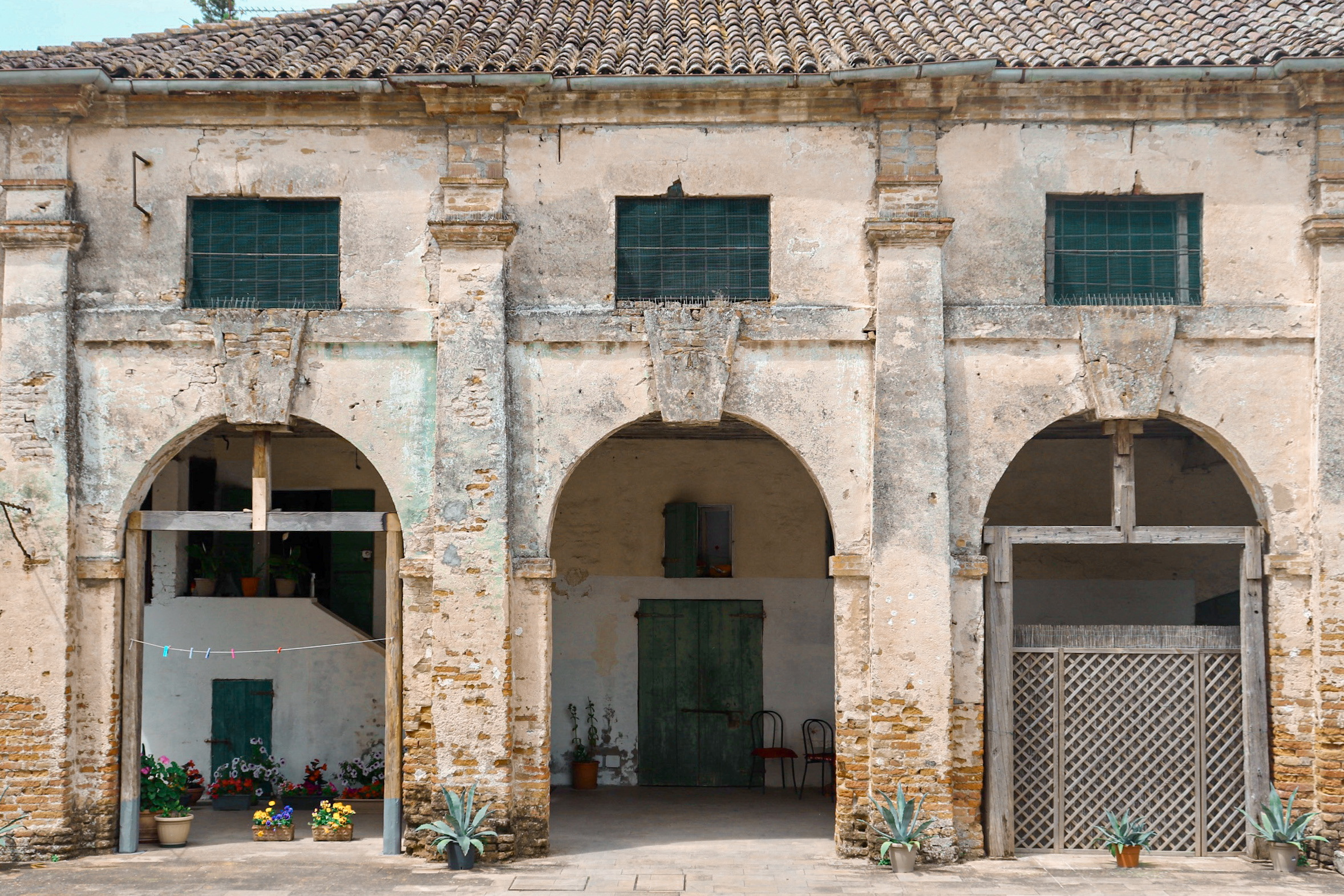
The western barchessa

Inside, the simplicity and rigid geometry of the exterior corresponds to a more articulated floor plan, centered around a large central room. The ground floor has nine rooms, including the atrium, while the piano nobile (main floor) has seven, all topped by a vast granary.

Although stylistically aligned with Palladian villas, the Villa cannot be definitively attributed to Palladio, as it lacks the key element that defines his work: the fusion of architecture and nature. The building makes no use of the canal surrounding the estate or the irregular shape of the land, both of which could have suggested a more dynamic orientation or a more complex floor plan. Additionally, the staircase does not create a connection with the landscape: the first ramp, with only a few steps, touches the ground, while the second, longer ramp is already part of the central projection, becoming one with the building.

The porticos and barchesse further reinforce the villa’s rigid geometry. The barchesse, symmetrically positioned on either side of the building, have porticos parallel to the villa’s sides, emphasizing its regular layout and contributing to the isolation of the structure from the surrounding landscape.

Thus, the architecture of the villa is more aligned with the taste for regular geometric forms, which became prominent in Venetian architectural culture in the second half of the sixteenth century, rather than with Palladian principles.

=== Frescoes ===
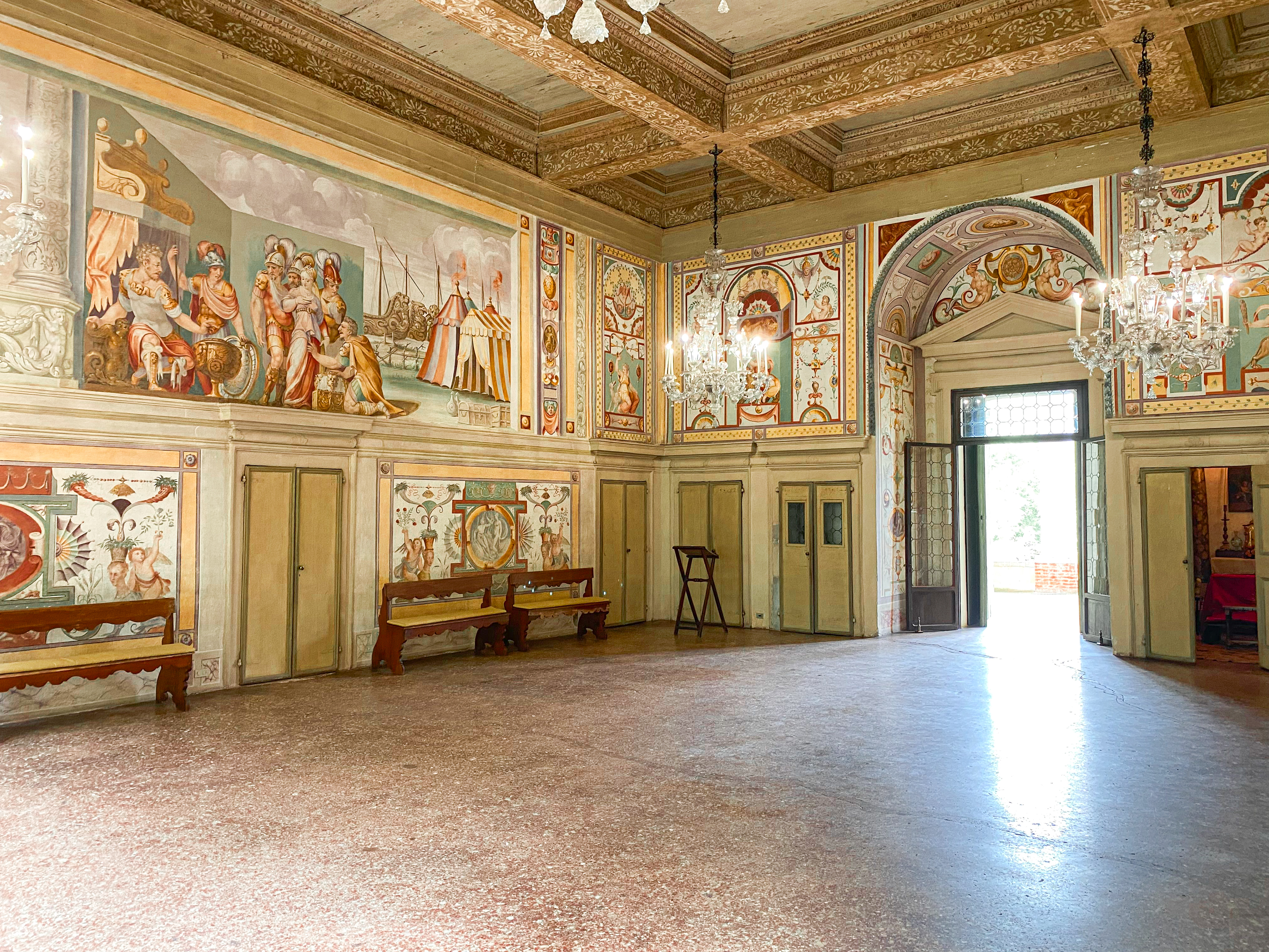
Frescoed hall on the noble floor facing north.

Except for those, qualitatively modest, painted on the side walls of the central hall, the frescoes in the villa cannot be attributed to neoclassical taste. Although they exhibit characteristics reminiscent of traditional Venetian colorism, they are much closer to the Tuscan style of the nearby Villa Badoer, from which they also draw the sixteenth-century theme of the grotesque and the execution technique. It is likely that these frescoes, created shortly after those in the Badoera, were the work of a Venetian painter from the Veronese school of Eliodoro Forbicini and Anselmo Canera, although the artist's identity remains unknown.

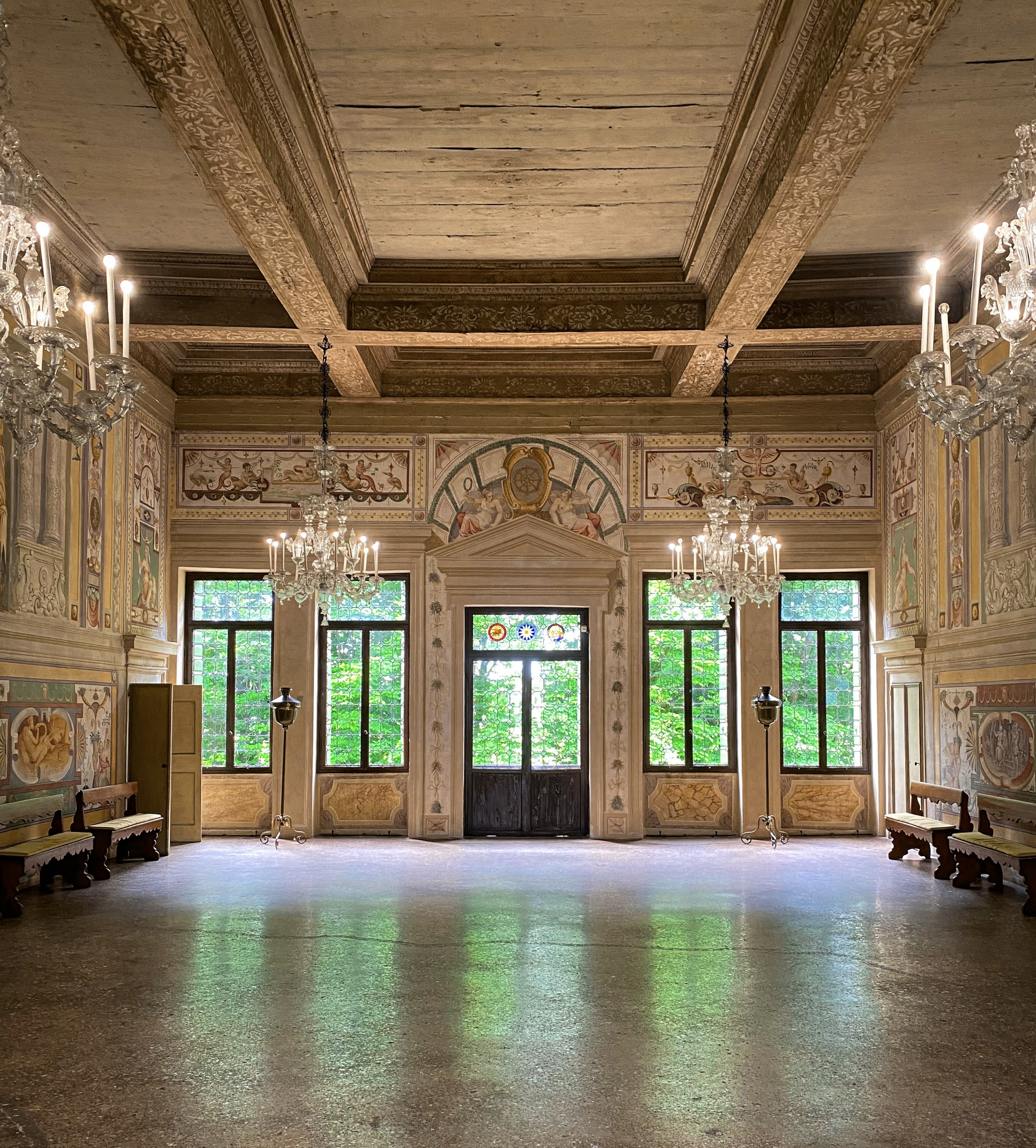
Frescoed hall on the noble floor facing south.

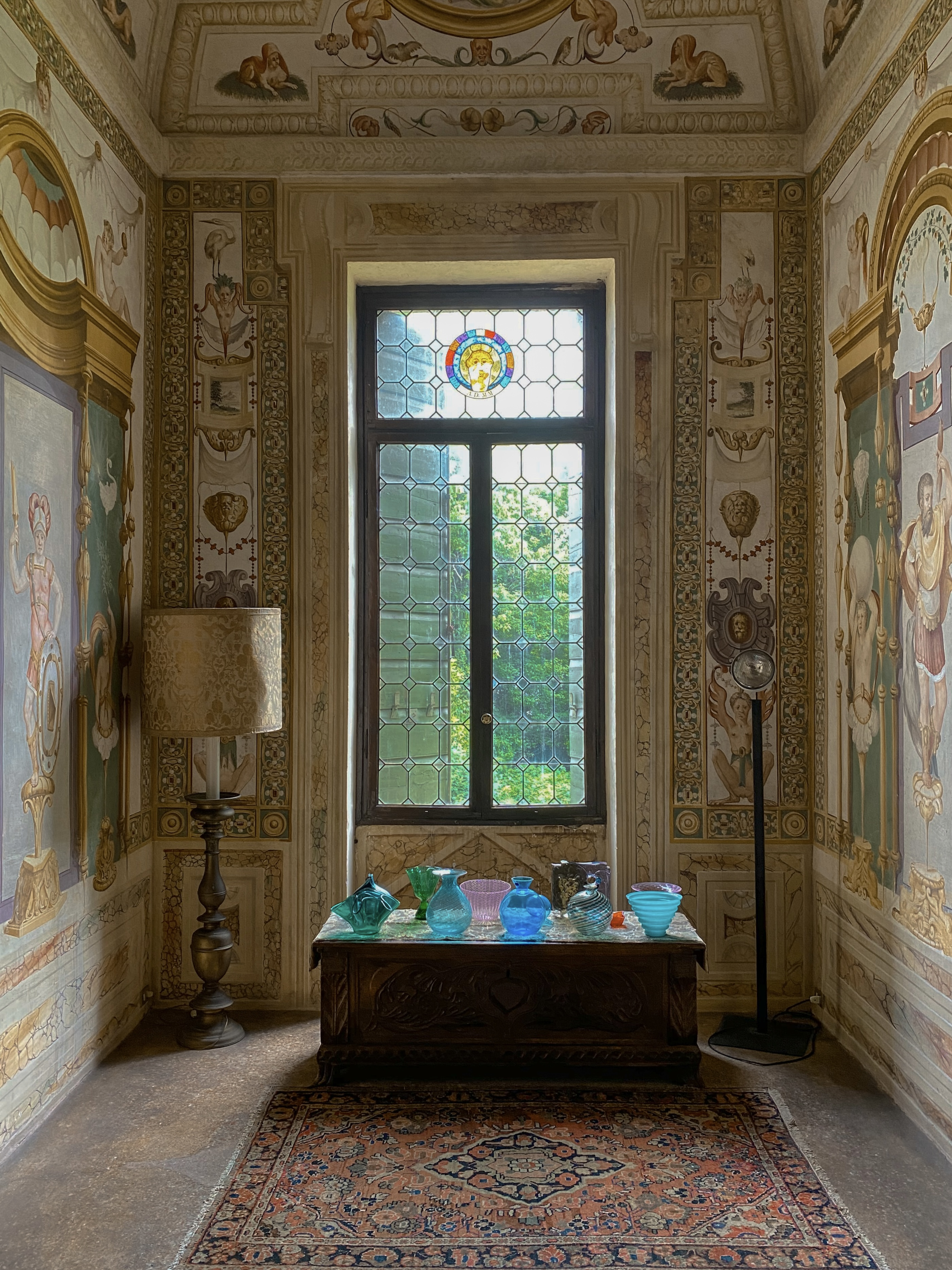
Frescoed small room on the noble floor.

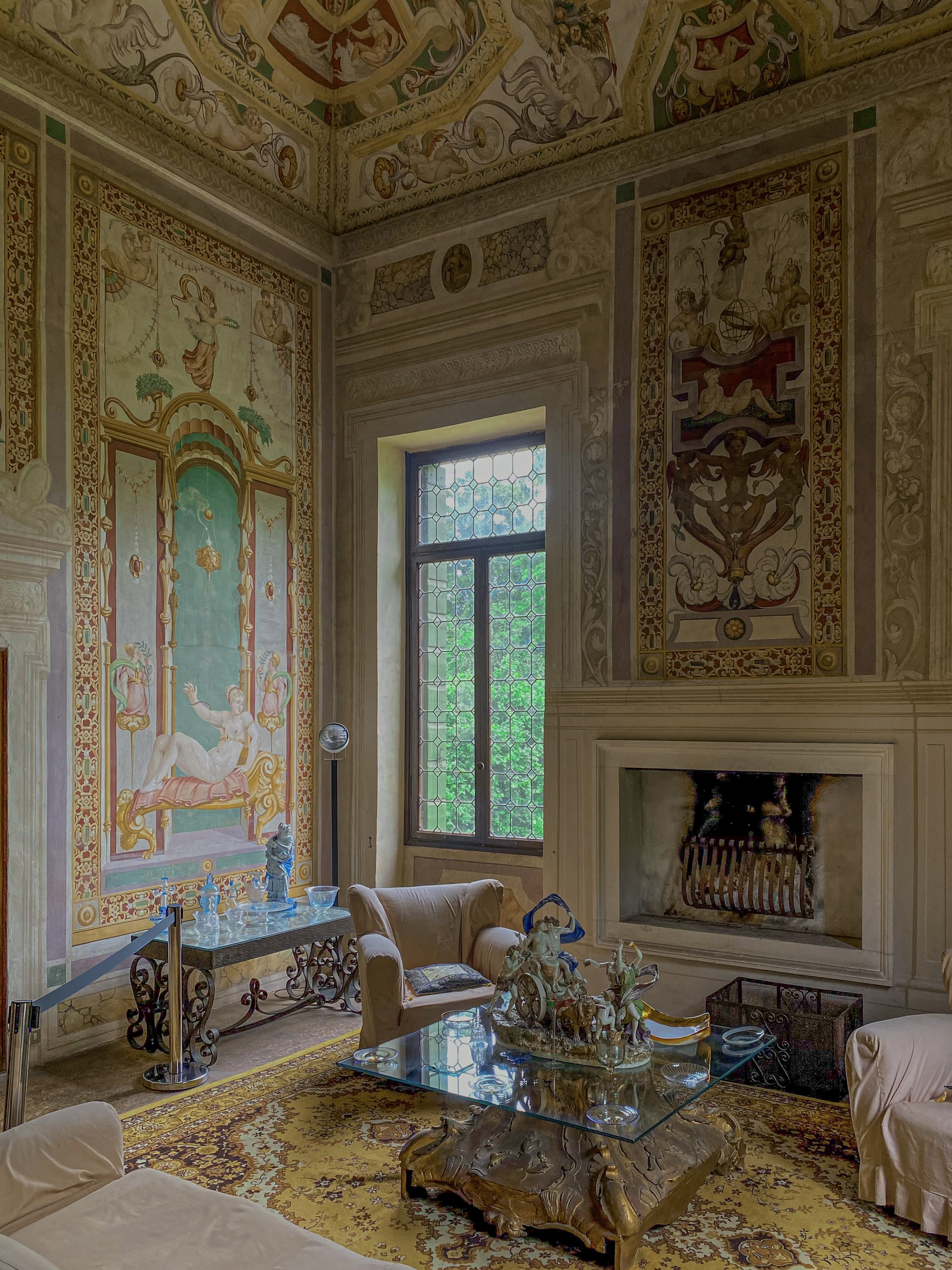
Frescoed lounge on the noble floor.

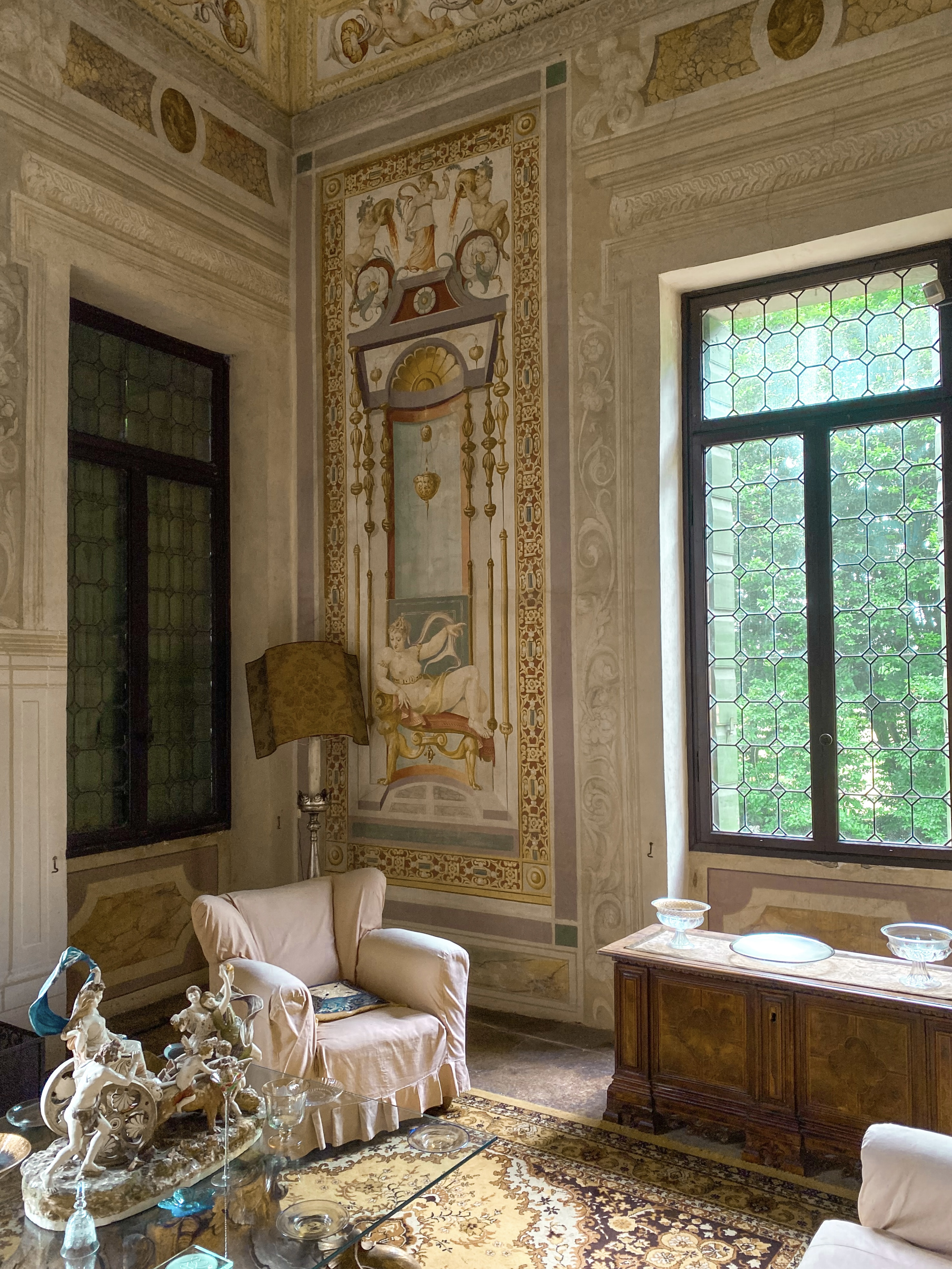
Frescoed small lounge on the noble floor.

== Bibliography ==
- Canova, Antonio (1975). Ville del Polesine. Istituto Padovano di Arti Grafiche. pp. 65–69.
- Castegnaro Barbuiani, Luisa (1984). Palladio e palladianesimo in Polesine. Franco Muzzio. pp. 63–77.
- Maschio, Ruggero, ed. (2001). Villa Loredan-Grimani Avezzù a Fratta Polesine. Rovigo: Associazione Culturale Minelliana.
  - Maschio, Ruggero. "Dimore degli dei. Il contesto, i committenti e i personaggi nelle vicende di Villa Loredan-Grimani, Molin, Avezzù". In Maschio (2001), pp. 9-28.
  - Rugolo, Ruggero. "La fabbrica e il suo sito: per "pareggiar la Fratta a l'alta Roma"". In Maschio (2001), pp. 47-104.
