= Voyage of the Loredan Brothers =

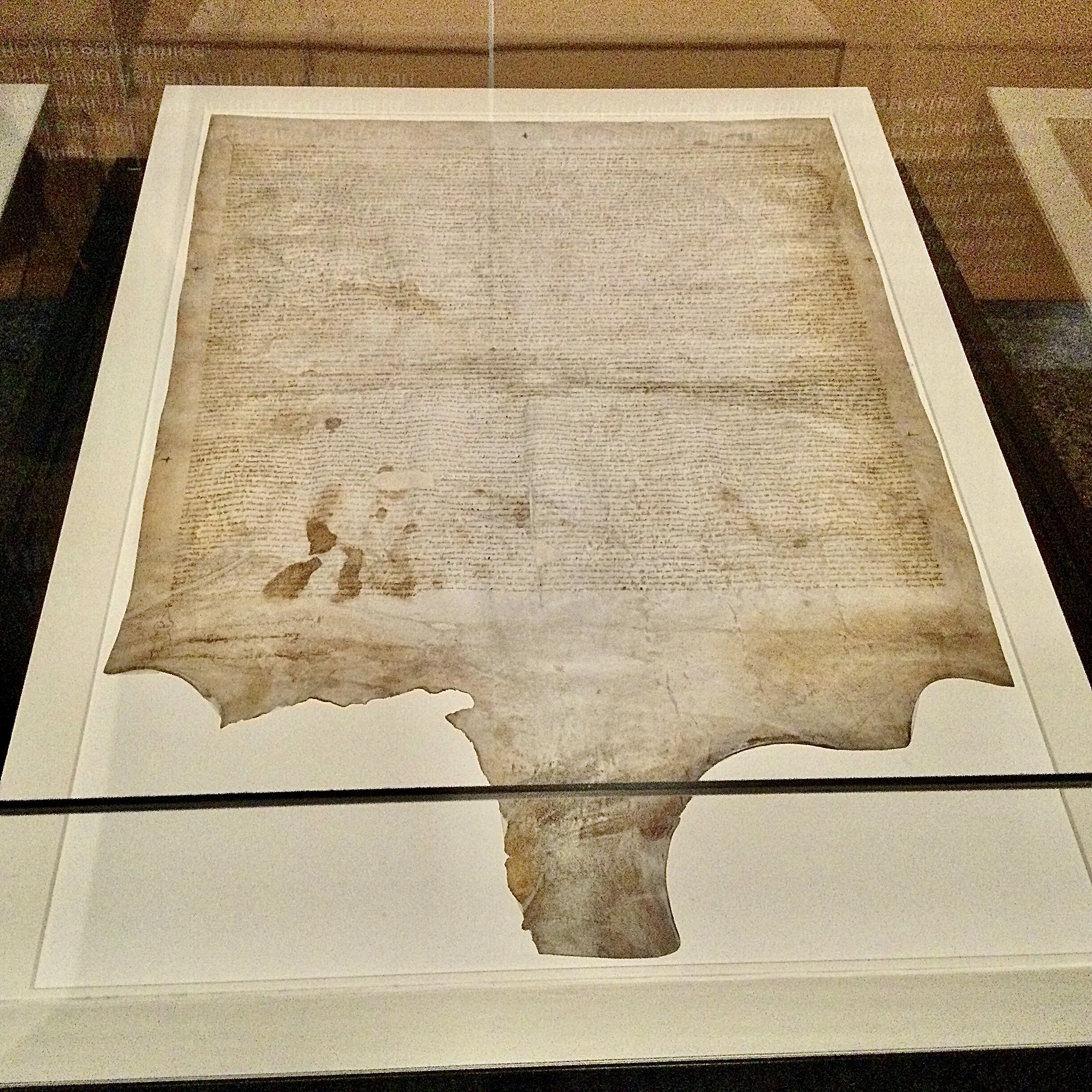
- Parchment from the 1350 court case against the heirs of Giovanni Loredan
- Date: 1338 – 1341
- Location: Black Sea, Central Asia, India
- Motive: establishment of commercial relations with the Delhi Sultanate
- Budget: 12,600 ducats
- Patrons: Contarini, Loredan, Querini, and Soranzo families
- Participants: Giovanni Loredan; Paolo Loredan; Andrea Loredan; Marco Soranzo; Marino Contarini; Baldovino Querini
- Deaths: 2; Giovanni Loredan, Baldovino Querini
- Trial: 12 February 1350

The Voyage of the Loredan Brothers was a commercial expedition undertaken between 1338 and 1341 by a group of Venetian patrician merchants led by Giovanni Loredan and his brother Paolo, members of the Loredan family. Organised as a colleganza (also known as a commenda), an early form of limited partnership, the expedition sought to establish profitable commercial relations with the Delhi Sultanate under Sultan Muhammad bin Tughluq. The journey is regarded as one of the most ambitious Venetian overland trading ventures of the fourteenth century and is frequently cited by historians as evidence of the increasing integration of Afro-Eurasian trade networks during the Late Middle Ages.

The expedition followed in the wake of the travels of Marco Polo, a relative of Giovanni Loredan, whose account of Asia encouraged Venetian merchants to pursue direct commercial ventures into Persia, India and China. Unlike earlier Venetian expeditions that continued eastward across Central Asia toward China, the Loredan company attempted a comparatively novel route by travelling south from the Black Sea through Central Asia, skirting the Pamir Mountains and crossing the Hindu Kush into northern India. Although the expedition ultimately generated substantial profits, Giovanni Loredan died before reaching Delhi, and the venture became the subject of a notable legal dispute that survives in a restored parchment dated 12 February 1350.

== Background ==
By the early fourteenth century, Venice had established itself as Europe's leading maritime trading republic. Following the Mongol stabilisation of much of the Silk Road during the thirteenth century, commercial connections between Europe and Asia expanded considerably. Inspired by Marco Polo's Travels, Venetian merchants increasingly ventured beyond the eastern Mediterranean into Persia, India and China. By 1324, Venice had established a permanent consul in Tabriz, reflecting the growing importance of long-distance commerce with the Ilkhanate and the wider Asian trading world.

From the 1320s onward, Venetian merchants organised companies to trade throughout Asia. These ventures commonly employed the colleganza, a contractual arrangement in which investors provided capital while travelling partners conducted overseas commerce, sharing profits according to predetermined agreements. The Loredan expedition represents one of the best-documented examples of this institution.

== Formation of the company ==
The expedition was headed by Giovanni Loredan, an experienced merchant who had previously completed a commercial journey to China. According to contemporary records, his earlier expedition had exchanged European products—including Flemish and Florentine woollen cloth—for spices from East Asia. The venture had attracted investment from numerous Venetians, including several women led by Giovanni's mother, Caterina Loredan.

In 1338 Giovanni organised a second, more ambitious expedition, this time directed toward India. His companions included his brother Paolo Loredan, Andrea Loredan, Marco Soranzo, Marino Contarini, and Baldovino Querini. Together they assembled a common capital reportedly amounting to approximately 12,600 ducats (equal to around 44 kilograms of gold), while individual partners also carried merchandise on their own account. Giovanni himself transported Florentine cloth, selling part of it during the journey to finance expenses. His father-in-law, Alberto de Calle, invested six ducats in Giovanni's personal share through the colleganza agreement.

Giovanni's family attempted to dissuade him from undertaking another hazardous expedition after his recent return from China. Nevertheless, believing that exceptional profits could be earned through direct commerce with the Sultan of Delhi, he proceeded with the venture.

== Journey ==
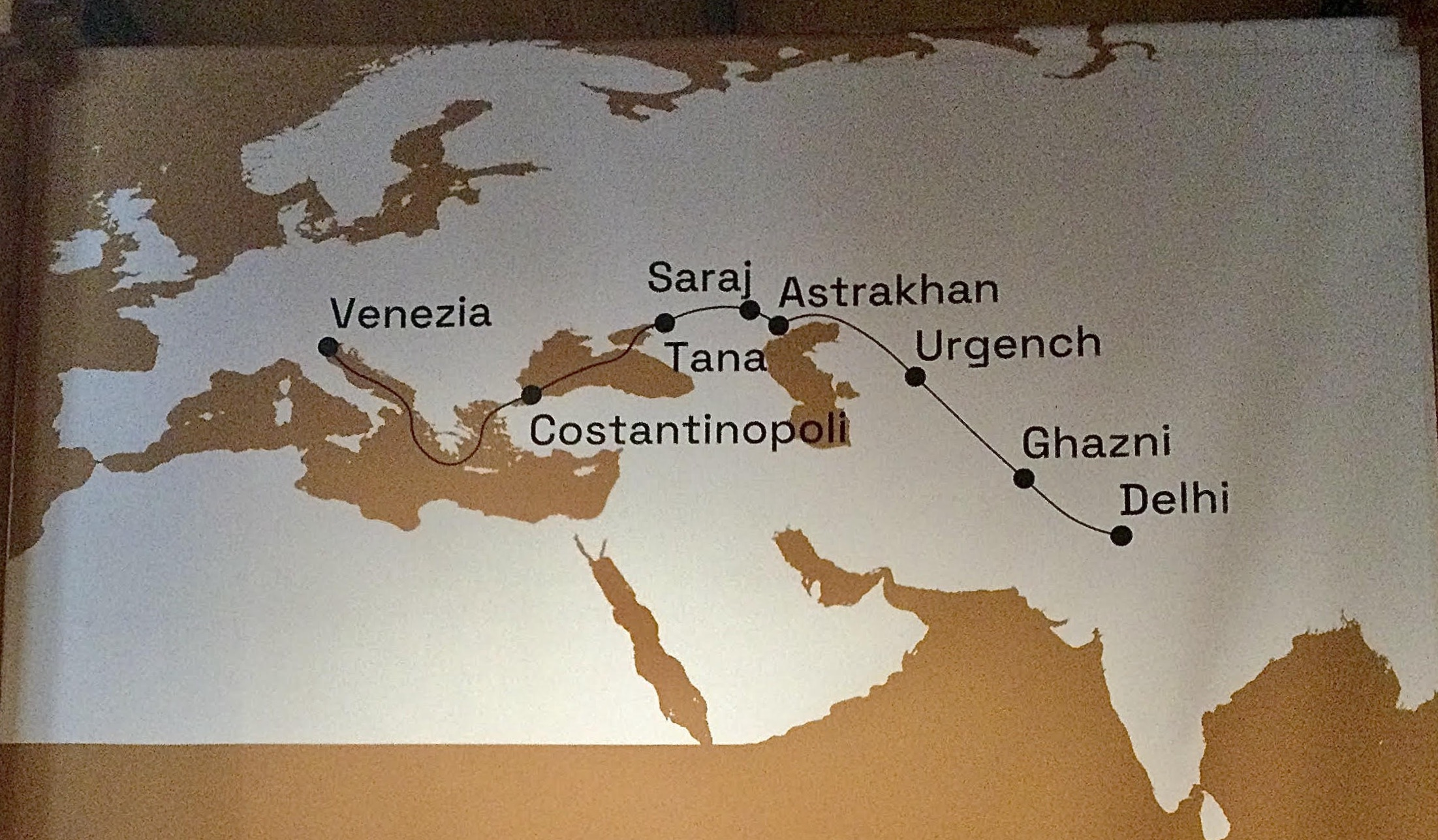
The itinerary undertaken by the trading party.

The merchants departed Venice during the summer of 1338, sailing aboard the galleys of Romania to Constantinople before continuing to Tana, the Venetian commercial colony at the mouth of the River Don on the Sea of Azov. From there they left the established maritime routes and proceeded overland across Central Asia.

Their itinerary passed through the regions surrounding the Pamir Mountains before crossing the Hindu Kush into Afghanistan and northern India. This southern approach represented a significant departure from the more familiar route followed by Venetian merchants travelling toward China.

The company carried valuable diplomatic gifts intended for Sultan Muhammad bin Tughluq, including mechanical devices such as a clock and an ornamental fountain, hoping to secure favourable trading privileges through displays of European craftsmanship.

=== Deaths and commercial success ===
The journey proved exceptionally dangerous. Giovanni Loredan died in Ghazni, in present-day Afghanistan, before reaching Delhi. Despite his death, Paolo Loredan assumed his brother's contractual obligations and continued the expedition with the surviving partners.

Upon reaching Delhi, the Venetian merchants successfully impressed Sultan Muhammad bin Tughluq with their gifts. The Sultan rewarded them generously—later accounts describe a payment of approximately 200,000 Indian coins. The merchants invested much of this wealth in the purchase of pearls, a highly profitable commodity for Mediterranean markets.

The return journey also claimed lives. Baldovino Querini died before the expedition reached Venice, while the surviving merchants divided the pearls among themselves and returned by the end of 1341, realising a substantial commercial profit.

== Legal dispute ==
Because Giovanni Loredan died before the expedition concluded, the settlement of his commercial obligations became the subject of litigation.

In 1350, Giovanni's father-in-law, Alberto de Calle, initiated legal proceedings before the Judges of the Procurator, seeking repayment of both his original investment and the profits that would ordinarily have accrued under the colleganza agreement. The defendants were the guardians of Giovanni's three minor sons and his widow, Filippa.

Although Alberto prevailed in court, the final return appears to have been considerably smaller than anticipated, illustrating both the risks and uncertainties associated with medieval long-distance commerce. The surviving parchment documenting this lawsuit provides historians with an exceptionally detailed account of Venetian overseas trade and partnership arrangements.

== Rediscovery of the parchment ==
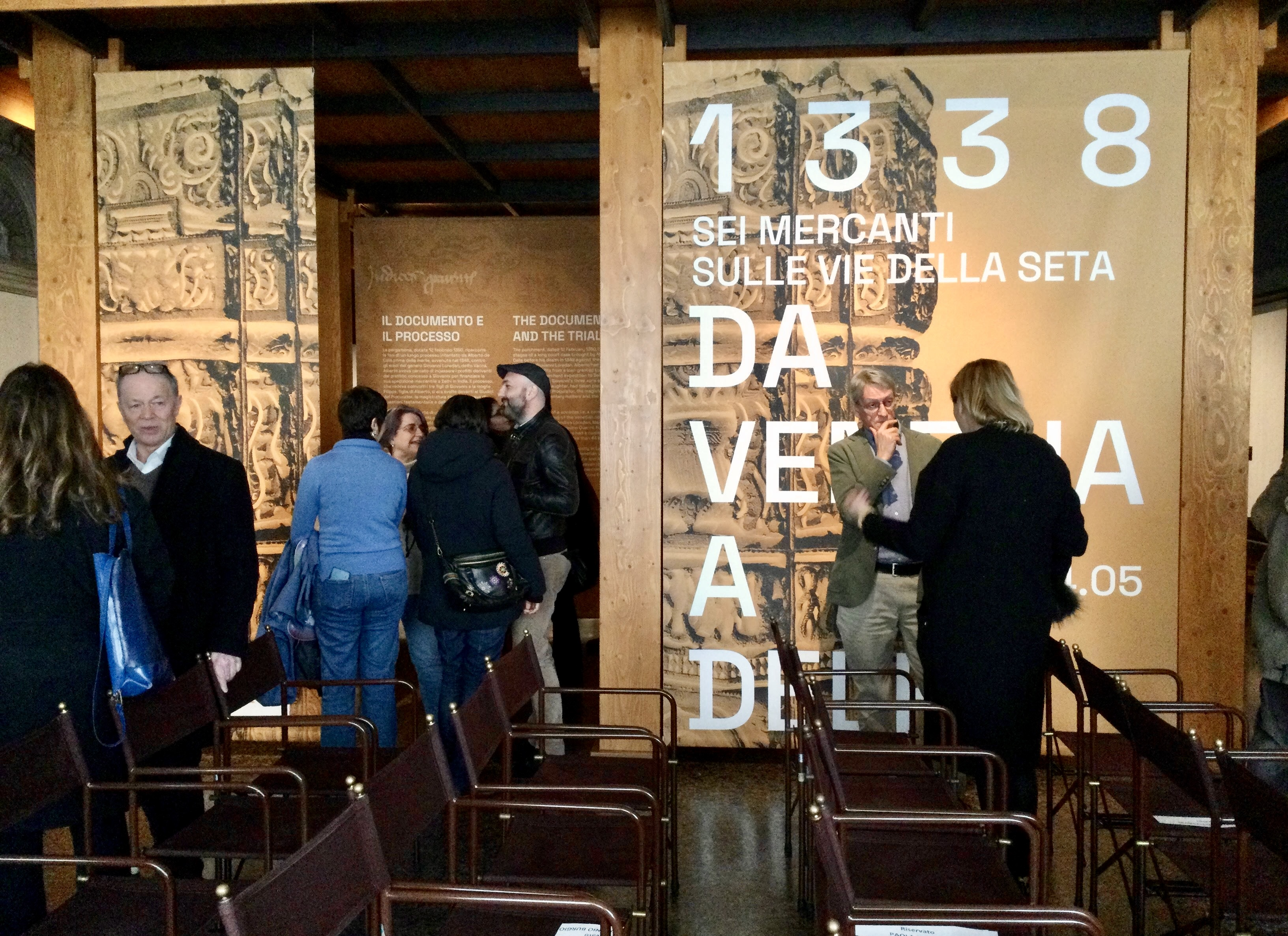
Photo from the 2025 exhibition "1338: From Venice to Delhi. Six Merchants on the Silk Roads", Ca' Pesaro, Venice

The principal source for the voyage is a parchment dated 12 February 1350, preserved in the State Archives of Venice. After spending decades uncatalogued, the document was rediscovered and restored through a project supported by the University of Warwick. The restoration revealed extensive information concerning the merchants' investments, itinerary, commercial transactions and subsequent legal proceedings.

The document formed the centrepiece of the 2025 exhibition "1338: From Venice to Delhi. Six Merchants on the Silk Roads" at the Museum of Oriental Art in Ca' Pesaro, Venice.

== Historical significance ==
Historians regard the voyage of the Loredan brothers as one of the clearest illustrations of the globalisation of commerce during the Late Middle Ages. The expedition demonstrates the sophistication of Venetian financial institutions, including the colleganza, the willingness of merchants to undertake unprecedented transcontinental journeys, and the existence of integrated trading networks linking Europe with Persia, Central Asia, India and China decades after Marco Polo's travels.

The voyage also illustrates how medieval commerce relied upon continuous exchanges rather than the simple transport of goods from one terminus to another. Merchandise was repeatedly bought and sold along the route in response to regional market conditions, reflecting a highly developed commercial economy spanning much of Eurasia.

The restored court records have been described by economic historians as among the richest surviving sources for understanding Venetian mercantile activity in Asia during the fourteenth century, and the voyage is frequently cited as an emblematic example of the emergence of a truly interconnected global economy before the Age of Discovery.
