= Palazzo Loredan a San Cancian =

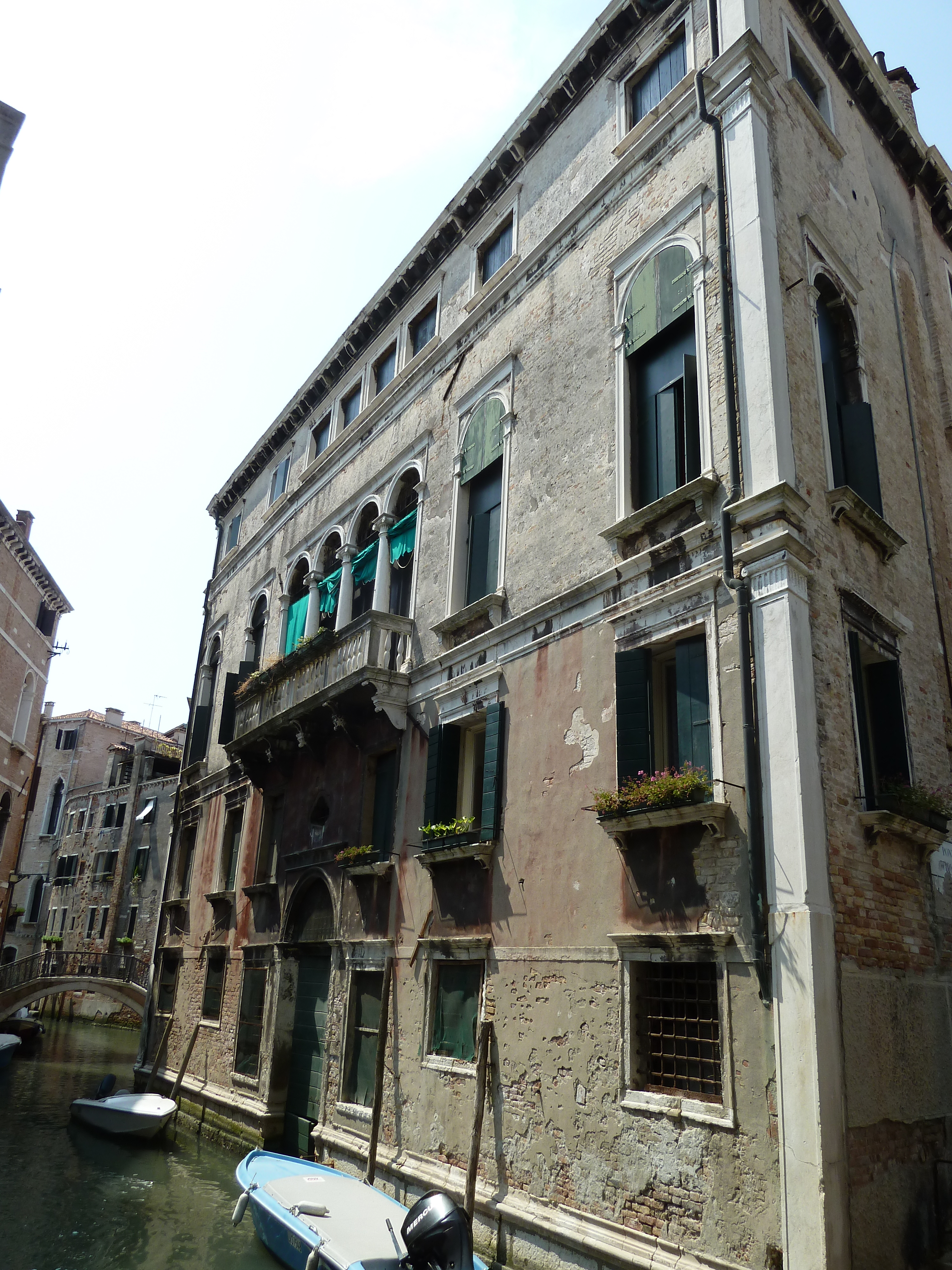
- Interactive map of the Palazzo Loredan a San Cancian area

General information
- Location: Venice, Italy, Calle Larga Widmann 6059, Cannaregio

Palazzo Loredan a San Cancian is a palace of the San Cancian branch of the Loredan family located at Calle Larga Widmann in the Cannaregio district of Venice, near the Church of San Canciano after which it was named. The San Cancian branch of the Loredan family produced an illustrious dynasty of admirals and politicians including Pietro Loredan (1372–1438), Alvise Loredan (1393–1466), Giacomo Loredan (1396–1471), Giorgio Loredan (d. 1475), Antonio Loredan (1446–1514), as well as the Duke of Candia Giovanni Loredan (d. 1420).
