= Fosco Loredan =

16th-century Venetian nobleman

- N.H.
- Known for: The Ghost of Fosco Loredan (urban legend)
- Died: 1598; Venice, Republic of Venice
- Cause of death: suicide by drowning
- Family: House of Loredan
- Spouse: Elena Grimani

Fosco Loredan (died 1598) was a 16th-century Venetian nobleman of the Loredan family known for the murder of his wife Elena Grimani by decapitation, which resulted in an urban legend known as The Ghost of Fosco Loredan. The legend says that, on full moon nights, and when the northern wind blows, the ghost of Fosco Loredan appears over the Grand Canal, holding his wife's head in his hands.

== Life ==
Born in the 16th century, not much is known about Fosco's life before the incident, except that he was a "well-known" man of the noble Loredan family, historically one of Venice's most distinguished families. He married the much younger noblewoman Elena Grimani, daughter of Piero and niece of Marino Grimani, future Doge of Venice. Throughout his life with her, he was known to be jealous and would regularly spy on her, as she was constantly getting attention from other suitors due to her beauty.

Arms of the Loredan and Grimani families.

== Legend ==
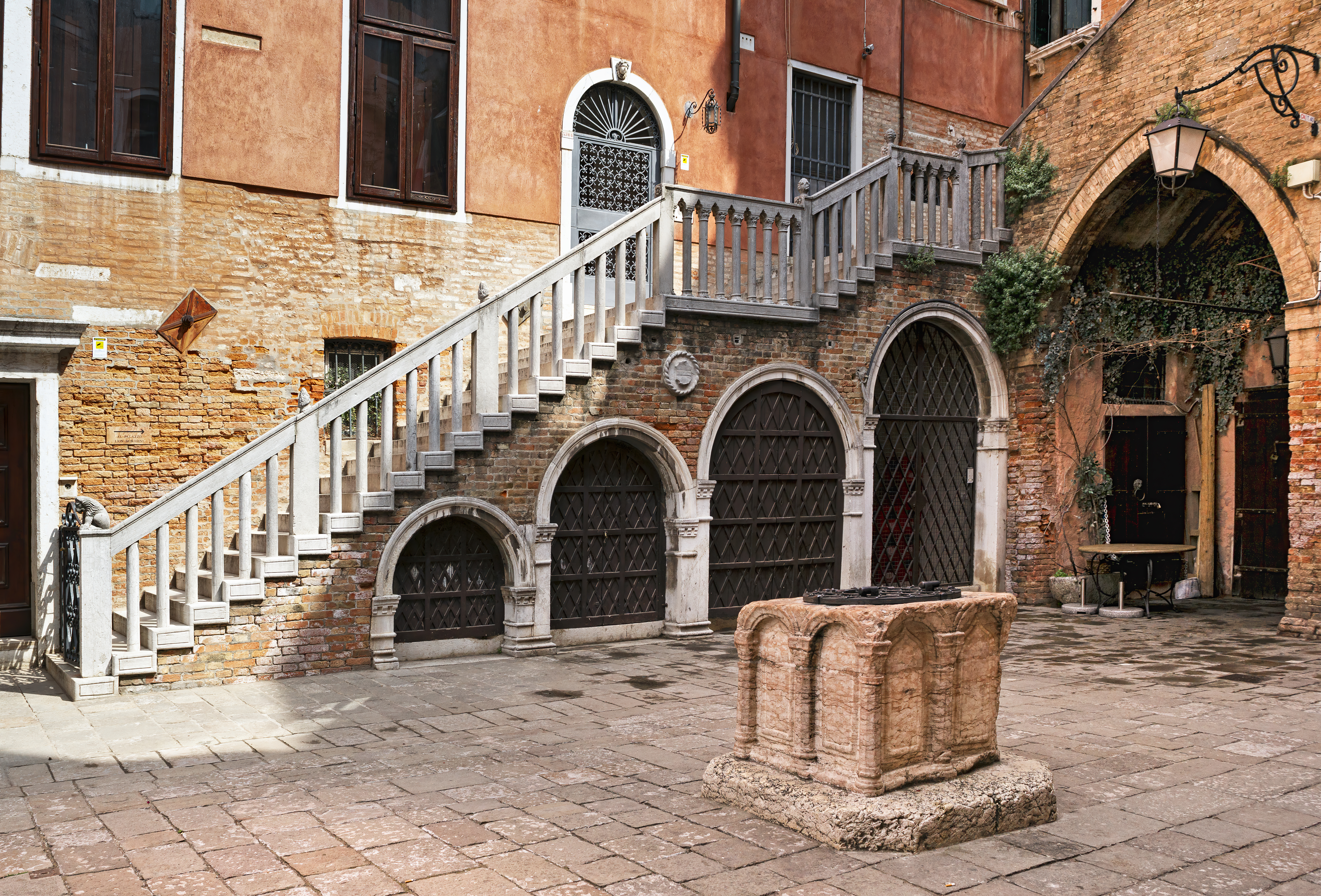
Campiello del Remèr, the place of the murder, located in the sestiere of Cannaregio, Venice.

One night in 1598, convinced that his wife had betrayed him, and blinded by his feelings, Fosco went to Campiello del Remèr in Cannaregio to look for her with the promise in his heart to make her pay. Trying, perhaps, to find refuge in some door of the Campiello del Remèr that had opened to her cries for help, the fate for the unfortunate woman now seemed to be sealed.

Returning home to his palace and hearing the woman's cries, her uncle, Doge Marino, reached the Campiello, placing himself between the noble Fosco Loredan and his niece Elena Grimani. A presence that would have petrified any man but not the angry and very jealous Fosco who, after having explained the reasons for his fury, which would have resulted from the close acquaintances of his wife Elena with one of her cousins of the Mocenigo family, and having received from the Doge the imperious order to sheathe the sword he had drawn to strike his wife, he pretended to acquiesce to reason. But, waiting for the Doge to put his blade in the sheath too, after he had used it to protect the unfortunate Elena and give more strength to his command, Fosco yelled at the Doge to watch his back because armed men were approaching, distracting him from those few moments needed to deal a precise blow of the blade that cut off the head of the unfortunate Elena. It was that gesture that exhausted the violence of the murderous mind of Fosco who, immediately after, throwing himself on the dismembered corpse of his wife, began to invoke the Doge's pity.

The Doge, recovering from the ferocious surprise, was about to execute on the spot Fosco Loredan, who, as a noble equal of him, asked for forgiveness in the name of a norm in use by the nobles at the time, which justified the betrayed husband who executed his wife for infidelity - a request that the astonished Doge Marino Grimani nevertheless denied. At that point, with his authority he condemned the man to go to Rome to ask for the Pope's grace, as His Holiness was the only one who could have granted it to a noble of the rank of Loredan. At the same time, in that obscure Campiello del Remèr which overlooks and closes on the Grand Canal, he ordered her bloodthirsty husband to pick up the severed body and load it on his shoulders while, with the guilty hand, pick up the head of the beautiful Elena and walk to Rome to submit to the judgment of the Pope who would have to see him in this way. Fosco left for the Eternal City but, having arrived there, still with his clothes and limbs stained with the blood of the body that he had been forced to carry on his shoulders, clutching his wife's head between his hands, he was not even admitted to the sight of Pope Clement VIII who, having heard the story, categorically refused to meet him and grant him forgiveness.

Following the Pope's refusal, Fosco escaped from the guards who were taking him to prison and went back to the Campiello del Remèr. Arriving there, out of desperation he threw himself into the Grand Canal, letting himself drown just a few steps from the shore.

According to local tradition, on the anniversary of Elena's death, the ghost of Fosco Loredan is said to appear carrying his wife's head through the streets of Venice.
