= Villa Nani Loredan =

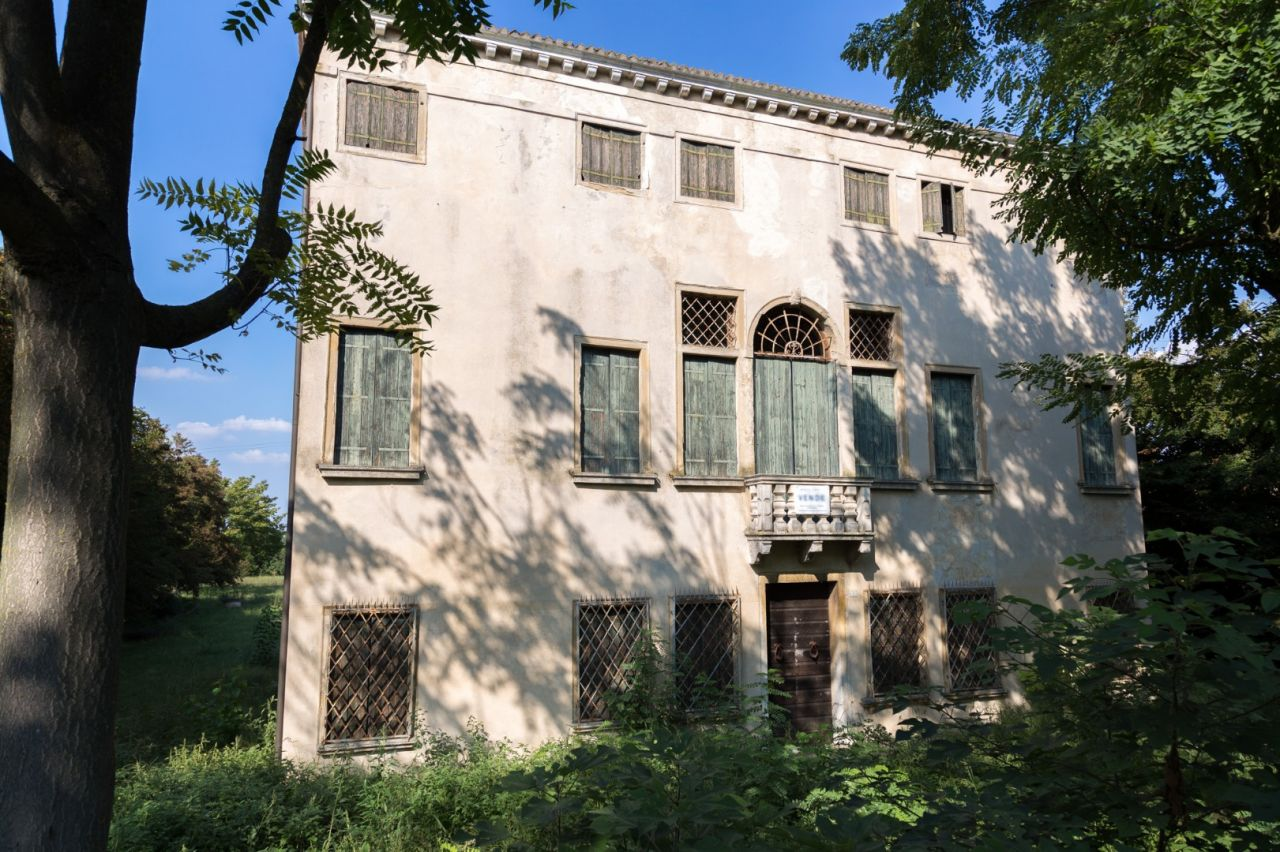
- Villa Nani Loredan
- Interactive map of the Villa Nani Loredan area
- Etymology: by the Nani and Loredan families

General information
- Architectural style: Venetian Renaissance
- Location: Via Priula 2, Sant'Urbano, Italy
- Completed: late 16th century
- Renovated: 1960s

Technical details
- Floor count: 3
- Grounds: 7.5 acres (3 hectares)

Renovating team
- Renovating firm: Fine Arts Council

Villa Nani Loredan is a late 16th-century patrician villa located in Sant'Urbano, near Padua in the Veneto region of northeastern Italy. The residence gets its name from the noble Nani and Loredan families, which had historically owned it. It is managed by the Istituto Regionale Ville Venete as Villa Loredan.

== Description ==
The Venetian style villa was built in the late 16th century. According to the land registry of 1666, the villa was owned 1/4 by him and 3/4 by Francesco Loredan, of the very wealthy Santo Stefano branch of the House of Loredan. The residence was later fully acquired by the Loredan family. The walls of the halls and the bedrooms are entirely covered by paintings attributed to the school of Paolo Veronese, in particular Carlo Caliari.
