= Vittorio Spreti =

- Born: 1887; San Severino Marche
- Died: 1950 (aged 62–63); Milan
- Occupation: Historian
- Writing career
- Notable work: Enciclopedia storico-nobiliare italiana

Vittorio Spreti (1887–1950) was an Italian historian of the nobility of Italy. He came from an ancient noble family of Ravenna, in the Marche, and was a marquess. His Enciclopedia storico-nobiliare italiana was published in eight volumes between 1928 and 1936.

== Publications ==
- Enciclopedia storico-nobiliare italiana: famiglie nobile e titolate viventi riconosciute del R. Governo d'Italia, compresi: città, comunità, mense vescovile, abazie, parrocchie ed enti nobili e titolati riconosciuti. Milano: Ed. Enciclopedia Storico-Nobiliare Italiana, 1928–36.

Vol. I: (A-Ba), 1928, 538 p.;

  - Vol. II: (Be-D), 1929, 645 p.;
  - Vol. III: (E-K), 1930, 713 p.;
  - Vol. IV: (L-O), 1931, 957 p.;
  - Vol. V: (P-R), 1932, 894 p.;
  - Vol. VI: (S-Z), 1932, 1045 p.
  - Appendice 1: A-C, 688 p.;
  - Appendice 2: D-Z, 767 p.
