= Villa Razzolini Loredan =

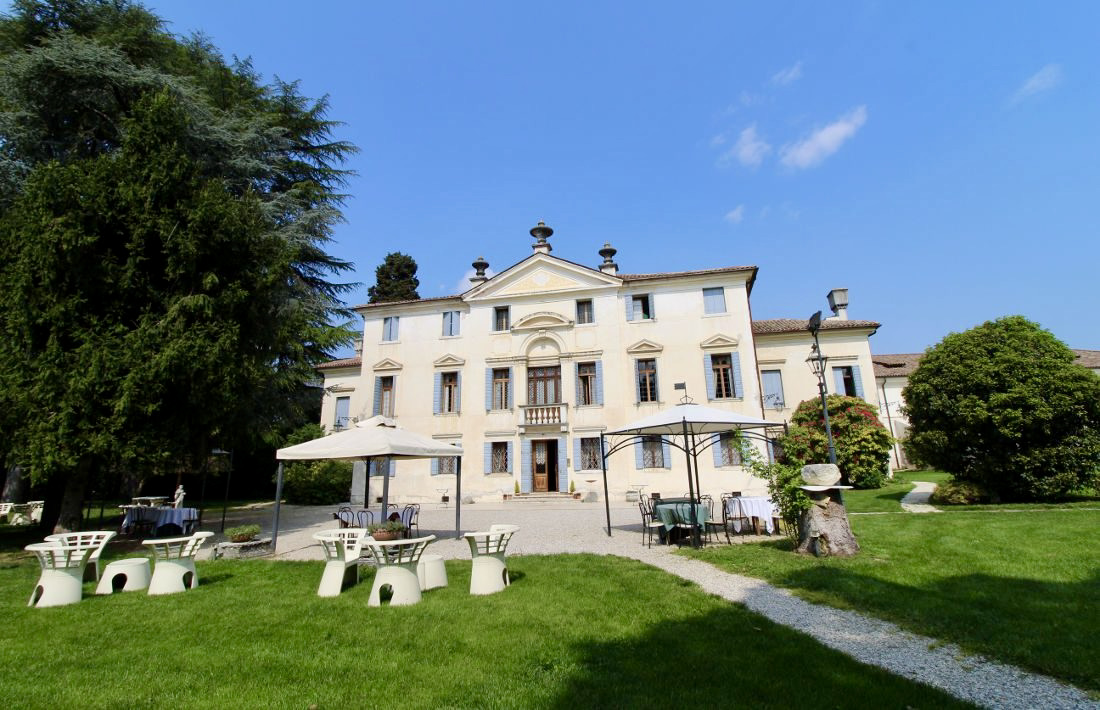
- Villa Razzolini Loredan in Asolo
- Etymology: by the Razzolini and Loredan families

General information
- Location: Via Schiavonesca Marosticana 15, Asolo, Italy
- Completed: 17th century

Technical details
- Floor count: 3
- Grounds: 10,000m²

Design and construction
- Architect: Giorgio Massari

Renovating team
- Architect: Ivano Sebellin

Website
- https://www.villarazzolini.it/en/villa/

Villa Razzolini Loredan is a 17th-century villa located in Asolo in the Veneto region of northeast Italy, historically owned by the noble Razzolini and Loredan families.

== History ==
The noble Razzolini family possessed the land on which the villa stands since the second half of the seventeenth century. At the center of the estate stood a beautiful dominical house of simple and square structure, with a rustic and attached oratory. It was inherited by various descendants of Onorio Razzolini, captain of the Imperial Army of Leopold I and in the second half of the eighteenth century, thanks to the fortunes accumulated overseas, the expansion and embellishment of the fund and the structure began. The primitive characters of the complex were almost completely erased, probably thanks to the involvement of the Venetian architect Giorgio Massari.

Of the three daughters of that Onorio Razzolini who gave luster and elegance to his Asolan home, the only one who remained tied to the paternal villa was Elisabetta, married to a Loredan. The second name was preserved at least until the second half of the nineteenth century. The dwelling only underwent routine maintenance work and remained with the Loredans until 1907, when it was sold for 40,000 lire to Count Oliviero Rinaldi, owner of the nearby Villa Rinaldi-Barbini. At his death the Villa was inherited by his daughter Ines, married to the Venetian nobleman Carlo Trentinaglia, and in 1962 the villa was subjected to the bond of law inherent in the protection of things of artistic and historical interest. In 1970 the owner gave it to her son Giacomo Trentinaglia and then the complex was sold to Dr. Antonio Luca, sole director of the company Tesi 14.

The Villa was transformed into a restaurant in 1998, and is included in the tourist food and wine itineraries of national and international travelers for its elegance and renowned cuisine. Currently it belongs to the Dussin family, which has engaged in a work of restoration that respects the original features of the complex.
