= Palazzo Loredan Porcia =

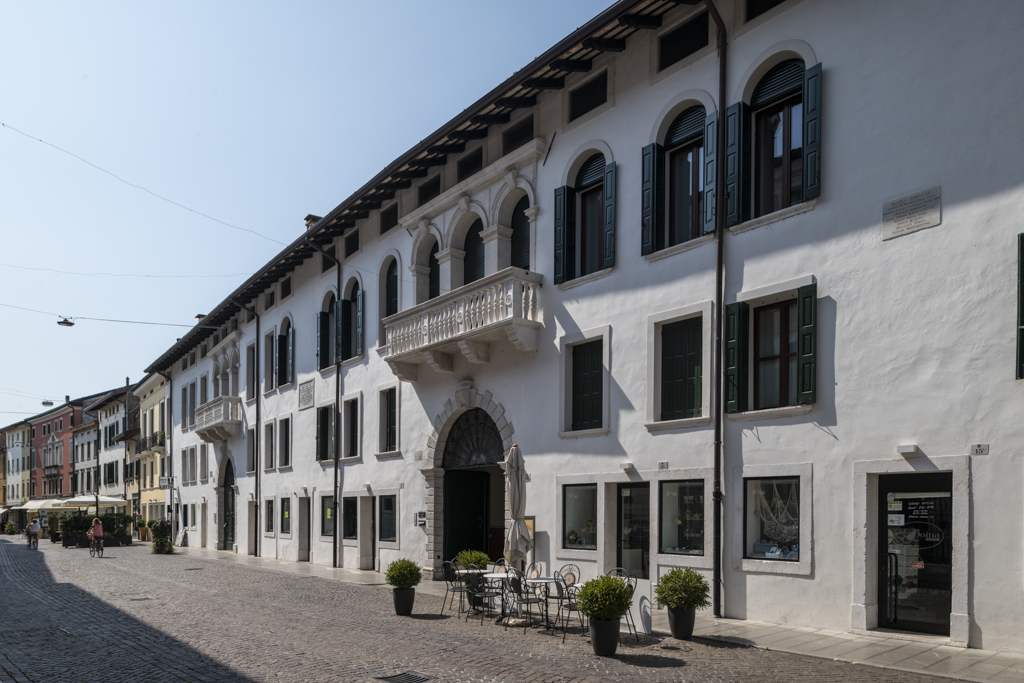
- Etymology: by the Loredan family

General information
- Location: Corso Garibaldi 15, Pordenone, Italy

The Palazzo Loredan Porcia is a 16th-century patrician palace of the Loredan family located in the city of Pordenone, in the Italian region of Friuli-Venezia-Giulia.
