= Antonio Loredan (politician) =

15th/16th-century Venetian nobleman

- Duke of Friuli
- Born: 1446; Venice
- Died: 1514 (aged 67–68); Venice
- Buried: Basilica of Santi Giovanni e Paolo
- Offices: Ambassador to France, the Papal States, and the Holy Roman Empire
- Family: House of Loredan
- Spouse: Franchescina Mòro di Baldissera
- Issue: Lorenzo Loredan
- Father: Lorenzo Loredan
- Mother: Marina Contarini

Antonio Loredan (1446–1514) was a Venetian nobleman and politician of the Loredan family, and the ambassador to the Papal States, the Kingdom of France and the Holy Roman Empire.

== Early life and family ==
He was born in Venice in about 1446 from Lorenzo di Bertucci of the San Cancian branch and from his second wife Marina Contarini di Giovanni. He had three brothers, Gerolamo, Alvise, Tommaso (two others, Bortolo and Piero, had died at birth), and a sister, Andriana.

In 1482, Antonio married Franceschina, daughter of the Procurator of Saint Mark Giovanni Moro di Baldissera, from whom he had no descendants. However, a natural son, Lorenzo, possibly illegitimate, is mentioned in the will.

== Career ==
Antonio entered the Maggior Consiglio around 1466, On 5 October 1475, he was elected to the office of auditor, in a fourteenth-century magistracy with appeal functions for the civil cases of the Dogado and Terraferma. On 28 February 1480, he was among those elected to Rason Nove, a body responsible for auditing public funds. In December 1482 he was chosen for the first diplomatic mission as ordinary ambassador of the Serenissima to the court of France and on 1 October 1483, the Senate commissioned him to present congratulations to the new King Charles VIII. Returning to his homeland in 1484, on 17 August he received public praise from the Senate for having concluded a peace agreement with the new king. On 12 May 1485, he was among those chosen by the Senate to the extraordinary embassy, with Bernardo Bembo, Pietro Diedo and Luigi Bragadin, to congratulate the newly elected Pope Innocent VIII. The delegation left Venice with 25 horses, two grooms, a notary and a personal prerogative of 100 ducats each for entertainment expenses.

Loredan was then delegated the task of ordinary ambassador to the Holy See, a position which he was forced to leave prematurely, recalled to his homeland to defend himself from accusations made against him before the Council of Ten. The genealogists Barbaro and Cappellari attribute this to bad administration or even overlook the charge, and Cicogna does not specify it either. The crime, as clearly expressed by the Council of Ten, was that of sodomy.

The Ten, on 7 September 1486, began their investigations by establishing a college "contra sodomitas deputatum", which, after a change decided on 5 October, was made up of Nicolò Duodo, Domenico Marin, Pietro Donà and Marco Pesaro. On 12 October, it was decided to send Antonio Vinciguerra to the papal court, to inform Loredan and his secretary Bernardo Teatini of the procedure in progress and to invite them to return to Venice within twenty days. On 3 January, the Ten, having completed the information procedures (the trial file was not received), elected a further council, composed of fifteen members, to issue the sentence against the two defaulting parties.

On 4 January 1487, Loredan was banned for ten years, with all the severe restrictive clauses provided for by the inquisitorial rite of the tribunal of the Ten, and the sentence was "published", that is, made known, even in the Maggior Consiglio. We do not know why Loredan did not consider it appropriate to return to Venice, nor where he found refuge during the years of the ban. By order of the Council of Ten he was allowed, on 21 March 1492, to return to the city, to present his belated defences and plead for the annulment of the sentence. Perhaps superior political reasons required an act of clemency on the part of the state that wanted to still enjoy his precious services and proven diplomatic skills.

Although the annulment of the announcement did not appear in the documentation of the Council of Ten, the Loredan was designated, on 30 March 1493, to the office of governor of the Revenue, a magistracy active in the field of tax collection for the State and on their control and revision. So, on 25 September 1494, he was elected among the members of the Council of Ten, a position he had to leave prematurely because he was chosen by the Senate, on 27 October, as ambassador, with Domenico Trevisan, to the King of France Charles VIII who, having gone down to Italy with a large army, had just crossed the Po, boasting succession rights over the Duchy of Milan and the Kingdom of Naples.

On 15 November, a commission was communicated to the new ambassadors, in twelve points, exhaustive of the wishes and intentions of the state, also signed by the future doge Leonardo Loredan as a Wise Man of the Council. Following a precise ceremonial, Loredan and D. Trevisan were instructed to reach the king as soon as possible to demonstrate "congruas et debitas commendationes et oblationes", warn him of the warlike intentions of the Turks who came from Constantinople, beg him as "good, religious and very Christian" to do his utmost for the safety of the Christian religion and, in their personal interest, to arm themselves for every case that might occur.

They met Charles VIII in Florence and followed him in his travels in Italy, when, on 22 April 1495, they were allowed by the Senate to return home.

Loredan was elected on 19 March 1496, to the prestigious magistracy of the three Avogadori de Comùn, but in 1498 he was called to another diplomatic mission. Charles VIII suddenly died on 7 April, at the age of only 28. On 4 May, the Senate arranged to send three ambassadors to France, Loredan, Nicolò Michiel and Girolamo Zorzi, to present congratulations to the new King Louis XII.

On 25 June they were given a special commission, indicating the directives to be implemented by the will of the Serenissima. In their passage through Milan they should manifest their mission as simply unofficial towards the king in order not to arouse suspicion of Duke Ludovico Maria Sforza known as il Moro, openly hostile to the Republic and worried by the claims made by the new French king as heir of Valentina Visconti. They arrived in France with rich gifts (two hundred very beautiful gibellini skins, with white hairs scattered among the black) and preceded by the sending of sixty falcons from Candia. They were immediately received in secret conversation by Louis XII, who proposed a league against Sforza to the Serenissima. After having reported the offer to the Senate, and well-received by the same to enter into any peace and alliance agreements, the pact was ratified in Blois on 15 April 1499. The contractors promised to be allies in perpetuity and not to help each other's enemies; Venice undertook to participate in a possible war against Milan by supplying at its own expense at least 1500 armigers and 4000 infantry and, in case of victory, would have obtained the territory and the city of Cremona. Other clauses were inserted in relation to possible hostilities of the Turks against Venice and of the Holy Roman Empire against France. When the news reached Venice, the Senate ordered that the text of the agreement be publicly read in Saint Mark's Square.

Recalled home on 14 September, Loredan was elected on 22 Jan 1500, lieutenant of Friuli, but he had to leave the rectorate prematurely because he was elected, on 8 February 1501, as ambassador to the court of Maximilian I of Habsburg, with Girolamo Donà. The two received the commission on 22 March and, accompanied by the secretary Giampietro Stella, went to Maximilian's court to exhort him to a joint war against the Turks.

The assignment was short-lived and Loredan was recalled to his homeland as early as 14 May. On 11 July 1501, he was elected podestà in Cremona, a position which he refused. He then continued to hold government posts, never straying from Venice.

On 30 July 1501, he was elected among the three judges of the procurator, a position to which he was called on again in 1506, 1507 and 1510. He was Wise Man of the Council from January to June of 1504, from June to December 1505, from September to June 1507, from June to December 1508, from June to September 1509 and, finally, from April to September 1512. On 1 October 1509, he entered the Quarantia, as well as in 1512 and again in 1513.

Antonio Loredan died in Venice in 1514. On 31 December 1510, he had delivered to the notary his autographed will, also signed by the then doge, Leonardo Loredan. He was buried in the Basilica of Santi Giovanni e Paolo, to whose convent he assigned 5 ducats. In addition to numerous charitable bequests, he protected the rights of his wife in life, also sharing other properties between his brothers and their male offspring.
