= Bragadin family =

Aristocratic Venetian family

Bragadin
- Family
- Country: Republic of Venice
- Titles: Patrician

The Bragadin family (also Bragadino or Bragadini) were an aristocratic Venetian family that belong to the Venetian nobility, counted among the Longhi.

== History ==
Tradition relates that the Bragadins came from the island of Veglia, today known as Krk in Croatia, of which they were lords, and numbers them among the twenty-four tribunician houses that elected the first doge Paoluccio Anafesto. Other traditions claim that they arrived in the Lagoon in 800 and that, originally called Barbalin, they changed their surname and coat of arms in 890.

Remaining included in the patriciate after the ordinances of the Great Council Lockout in 1297 established which families were part of the hereditary nobility of the council, the family was always represented in the highest offices of the Republic of Venice, especially between the 15th- and the 16th-century, but also gave numerous ecclesiastics and men of culture.

Among the many more illustrious personalities, mention should be made of Vittore, defender and then reconqueror of Verona during the war against Filippo Maria Visconti; Andrea, distinguished himself in the taking of Cyprus; Marcantonio Bragadin, distinguished himself in the defense of Famagusta against the Turks and became the emblem of Venetian martyrdom in the struggle against the Turks; Domenico, lecturer in philosophy, theology and mathematics, teacher of Luca Pacioli; Alvise Bragadin, who opened a famous printing house for Hebrew books and was involved in the Bragadin-Giustiniani dispute. The Bragadin family became one of Venice’s leading Hebrew print-shops and was active from the sixteenth to the eighteenth century.

== Distinguished Members ==
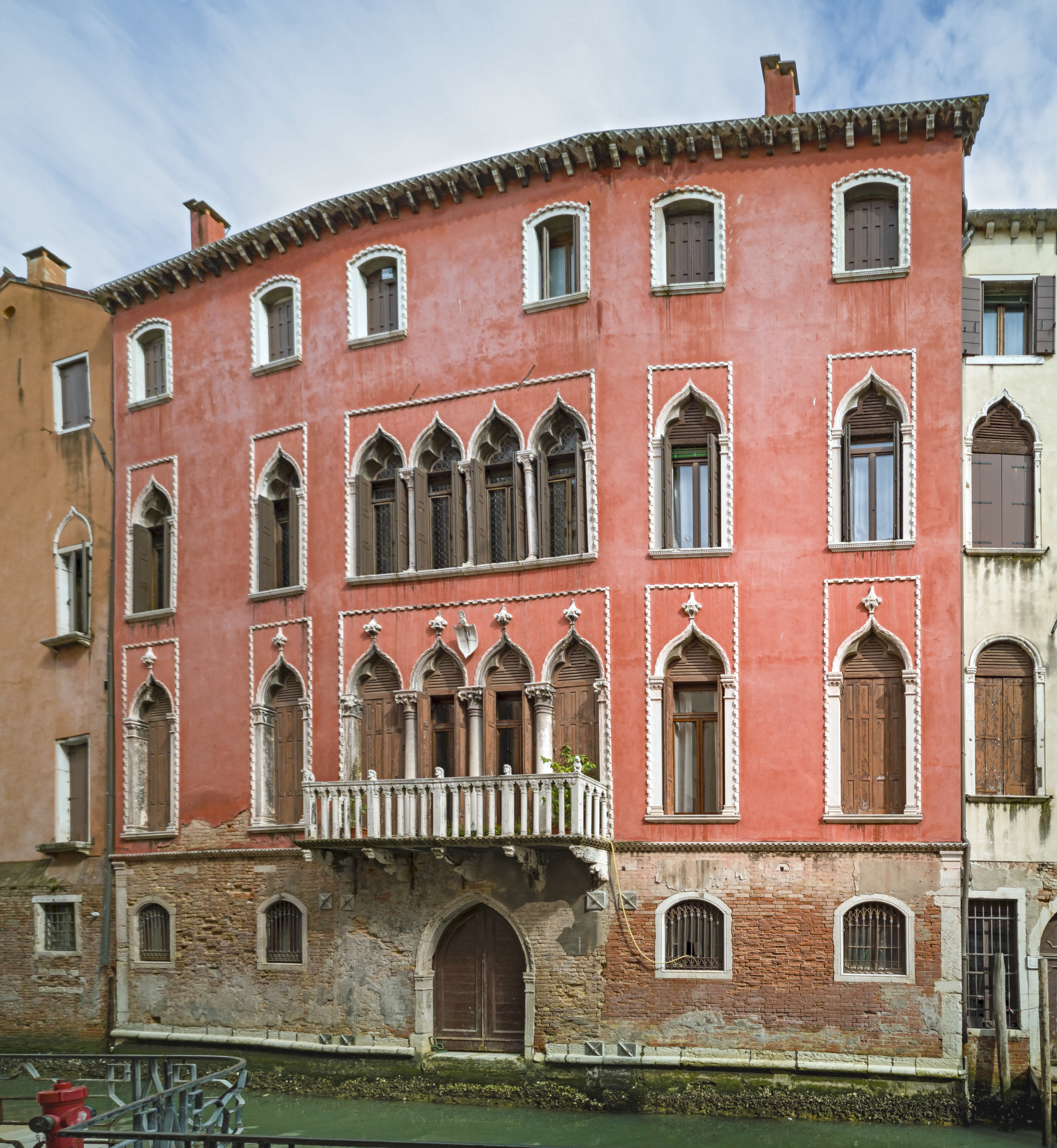
Ca' Bragadin Carabba - Rio San Lio, Venice

- Bartolomeo Bragadin poet, died in 1507; his tomb is located on the counter-façade of the church of Santi Pietro e Paolo in Venice;
- Marcantonio Bragadin (1523–1571), soldier;
- Marcantonio Bragadin (1591–1658) cardinal;
- Matteo Bragadin (1689–1767), politician;
- Vincenzo Bragadin (1691–1762), bishop;
- Giovanni Bragadin (1699–1775), patriarch of Venice;
- Marcantonio Bragadin (1906–1986), admiral;
- Vittorio Bragadin (1920–1941), pilot, gold medal for Military Valor
