= Niccolò Barbo =

Venetian patrician, official and humanist

Niccolò Barbo (c. 1420 – 1462) was a Venetian patrician, official and Renaissance humanist.

Barbo's Oratio in praise of Francesco Contareni

== Life ==
Barbo was born in Venice around 1420. He was the son of Piero (Pietro) Barbo and Chiara Bocco. He was distantly related to Paolo Barbo and Pietro Barbo. He studied under George of Trebizond and Paolo della Pergola. He was presented for the balla d'oro to the Great Council in 1438.

In 1440, Barbo served as Venetian ambassador to Alessandria. In 1441, he was an advocatus per omnes curias, one of the staff lawyers in the Doge's Palace. In 1444, he was one of the officials of the wine tax and head of the Council of Forty. In 1448, he served as ambassador to the Counts of Segni. In 1449, he was one of the Savi agli Ordini and, in 1450, one of the Giudici del Piovego. From 1450 to 1453, he was the visdomino of Ferrara.

In 1453, Barbo married Pellegrina di Tommaso Franceschi. They had three children: Marino, Pietro and Girolamo. In 1457, Barbo was one of the ducal elector at the election of Pasquale Malipiero. He died in 1462. His death took place before 31 August, the date on which Maffeo Vallaresso addressed a letter of consolation to Barbo's brother Giovanni.

== Writings and correspondence ==
Flavio Biondo praises Barbo for his "literary accomplishment".

A collection of his correspondence—eleven letters in total—is found in two manuscripts, Lat. XIV 256 and 257 in the Biblioteca Marciana. They cover the period 1438–1442. Included are letters to Paolo Barbo, Isotta Nogarola, Antonio Beccadelli, Andrea Trapesunzio, Tommaso Pontano and Jacopo Rizzoni, as well as letters from Nogarola and Giovanni Pontano. Some of his correspondence is preserved outside of the collection. This includes two further letters to Nogarola and one from her, letters to and from Francesco Barbaro and letters from Maffeo Vallaresso and Guarino Veronese. In his letter to Tommaso Pontano dated 24 November 1439, Barbo defended Nogarola from anonymous accusers.

On 27 March 1442 in Padua, Barbo delivered a speech honouring Francesco Contarini when the latter received his doctorate of arts. The Oratio in laudem nobilissimi viri Francisci Contareni is preserved in three manuscripts. Barbo is probably also the author of a short oration preserved amongst his letters. According to the heading, it was a piece of "silliness" (ineptias) composed when its author was fifteen, but much praised by his younger brother. Also possibly belonging to Barbo is the Sermo de sancto Romualdo, which has been attributed to Marco Barbo.

Around 1440, Barbo and two of his friends, Francesco Contarini and Lauro Quirini, wrote a collective response to Poggio Bracciolini's De nobilitate. The resulting Epistola nobilium virorum patritiorum ad Petrum Thomasium Physicum postulantium iudicium in causa Poiani dialogi positi in controversia de nobilitate, which all three signed but which Quirini wrote, is a defence of the Venetian nobility.

== Bibliography ==
- Gaeta, Franco (1964). "Barbo, Niccolò". Dizionario Biografico degli Italiani (in Italian). Vol. 6: Baratteri–Bartolozzi. Rome: Istituto dell'Enciclopedia Italiana. OCLC 883370.
- King, Margaret L. (1985). Venetian Humanism in an Age of Patrician Dominance. Princeton University Press.
- Labalme, Patricia H.; White, Laura Sanguineti, eds. (2008). Venice, Cità Excelentissima: Selections from the Renaissance Diaries Marino Sanudo. Translated by Linda L. Carroll. Johns Hopkins University Press.
- Rabil, Albert, ed. (1991). Knowledge, Goodness, and Power: The Debate Over Nobility Among Quattrocento Italian Humanists. Medieval and Renaissance Texts and Studies.
- Segarizzi, Arnaldo (1904). "Niccolò Barbo patrizio veneziano del sec. XV e le accuse contro Isotta Nogarola". Giornale Storico della Letteratura Italiana. 43: 39–54.
- White, Jeffrey A., ed. (2016). Biondio Flavio: Italy Illuminated. Vol. 2, Books V–VIII. Harvard University Press.
