= Maffeo Vallaresso =

Venetian patrician, humanist and prelate

Vallaresso depicted in the initial of a manuscript of his Regulae.

Maffeo Vallaresso or Valaresso (1415–1494) was a Venetian patrician, Renaissance humanist and prelate who served as the archbishop of Zadar (Zara) from 1450 until his death. A doctor in canon law and a collector of Greek and Latin manuscripts, he tried unsuccessfully on at least four occasions to be transferred to a more prestigious see.

== Early life ==
Vallaresso was born in the confino (district) of San Provolo in Venice in 1415. He was the eldest son of the patrician Giorgio di Vittore (died 1466) of the Vallaresso family and Maddalena di Giovanni of the Loredan family. Through the influence of his uncle, Fantino Vallaresso, archbishop of Crete, he received a canonry in the cathedral of Treviso with a prebend worth 40 florins and the right of administration in absentia when he was only ten years old in 1425. In 1432, he took up residence in Treviso and received minor orders.

Vallaresso received a humanistic education, initially at the Scuola di Rialto under Paolo della Pergola. He also studied under Guarino Veronese. In 1435, Pope Eugene IV exempted him from the obligation to reside in Treviso and he began studies at the University of Padua. He completed an arts degree in 1439 and received a doctorate in canon law on 26 May 1445. During his time at Padua, he received two Cretan canonries with exemption of residence, one in the cathedral of Candia and another in the cathedral of Chersonasus.

On 4 April 1449, Pope Nicholas V named Vallaresso protonotary apostolic. From Rome he sent an anonymous letter to the Council of Ten accusing Cristoforo Cocco of sharing state secrets with Alfonso V of Aragon. Identified and recalled to Venice, he was interrogated by the council, which finally accepted his accusations. On 1 July 1450, through the influence of the Venetian cardinal Pietro Barbo, he was appointed archbishop of Zadar by Pope Nicholas. He resigned his three canonries and, after wintering in Venice, arrived in Zadar on 14 February 1451.

== Archbishopric ==
First page of Vallaresso's deluxe copy of the 1469 Roman edition of Strabo's Geographica by Konrad Sweynheim and Arnold Pannartz. The initial contains a depiction of Strabo, while Vallaresso's coat of arms and monogram (MV) appear in the bottom margin.

As archbishop, Vallaresso restored the cathedral and the archiepiscopal palace. He was also a reformer who often clashed with the clergy of his diocese, especially that of the cathedral of Zadar, and with the suffragan bishops of his province. Although he spent most of his pontificate in Zadar, he was in Padua between May 1459 and September 1460. In 1463, he travelled to Rome to resolve a dispute concerning the will of Bishop Natalis of Nin. He accompanied Pope Pius II to Ancona, where the pope died. On his return to Rome, his old patron, Pietro Barbo, was elected pope as Paul II. He resided in the Palazzo Venezia in Rome from 1466 to 1471. He sought but never received a transfer to a more prestigious diocese.

On 26 June 1468, he was present as a witness in the house of Cardinal Bessarion when the latter donated his library of Greek and Latin manuscripts—the future Biblioteca Marciana—to the Republic of Venice. Also present were Francesco Barozzi, Bartolomeo Barbarigo, Pietro Foscari, Antonio Natale, Valerio di Viterbo, Ottaviano de Martinis de Suessa and the Venetian ambassador Paolo Morosini.

With the death of Paul II in 1471, Vallaresso returned to Zadar. When the Venetian government sent congratulations to Paul's successor, Sixtus IV, they included a list of fifteen Venetian clergymen they thought worthy of promotion. Vallaresso was on the list, but nothing came of it. In 1474, he joined the Canons Regular of San Giorgio in Alga. In 1476, he travelled to Venice to defend himself before the Patriarch of Venice against accusations by his archdeacon concerning the mishandling of tithes. In 1481, he put himself forward to the Venetian Senate as a candidate for the vacant bishopric of Padua. In 1485, he was a candidate for the bishopric of Treviso. In both cases he was passed over.

Vallaresso died in 1494, before 19 December. He was buried in the cathedral of Zadar. His executor, Krešo Nassis, signed a contract for his tomb monument with the sculptors Petar Meštričević and Nikola Španić on 4 January 1499. The monument was destroyed during renovations in 1782.

== Humanism ==
In 1432, while still a student, Vallaresso composed the Regulae, a short grammar of Latin in the style of his teacher, Guarino. His most important written work is his Epistolario, a large collection of his letters that provides insight into his education and his government of Zadar. According to the first scholar to study it extensively, Luka Jelić, it is "a mirror of public and private life in Dalmatia during the second half of the 15th century". It includes letters to Ermolao Barbaro, Francesco Barbaro, Zaccaria Barbaro, Marco Barbo, Niccolò Barbo, Paolo Barbo, Pietro Barbo, Candiano Bollani, Fantino Dandolo, Domenico de' Domenichi, Lauro Quirini, Lorenzo Zane, Ivan Sobota, Pietro Foscari, Ludovico Foscarini, Vitale Lando, Jacopo Antonio Marcello, Pietro Molin, Barbone Morosini, Zaccaria Trevisan and Jacopo Zeno. In addition, letters addressed to him survive from Francesco Barbaro, Marco Barbo, Ludovico Foscarini, Barbone Morosini, Lauro Quirini, Lorenzo Zane and Niccolò Sagundino.

Vallaresso's letters, especially to Pietro Barbo, Lauro Quirini and Lorenzo Zane, demonstrate his keen humanist and antiquarian interests. He collected ancient coins, medallions and cameos, passing many on to Barbo. He had a sizable personal library, collecting and exchanging manuscripts in Greek and Latin. Manuscripts he owned can now be found in the Biblioteca Guarneriana in San Daniele del Friuli, the Apostolic Library in the Vatican City and in libraries in Bologna and Venice. His letters also show his interest in Latin style.

== Bibliography ==
- Gandy, John (2023). "Incunabula Cataloguing Project". Rylands Blog. University of Manchester.
- Jakšić, Nikola (2015). "The Evidence from Nin concerning Bishop Natalis (1436–1462), Apostolic Legate to Bosnia". Miscellanea Hadriatica et Mediterranea. 2: 41–50.
- King, Margaret L. (1985). Venetian Humanism in an Age of Patrician Dominance. Princeton University Press.
- Melchiorre, Matteo (2020). "Vallaresso, Maffeo". Dizionario Biografico degli Italiani (in Italian). Vol. 98: Valeriani–Verra. Rome: Istituto dell'Enciclopedia Italiana. ISBN 978-88-12-00032-6.
- Melchiorre, Matteo; Venier, Matteo, eds. (2021). Maffeo Vallaresso, Epistolario (1450–1471) e gli altri documenti trasmessi dal codice vaticano Barberiniano latino 1809. Znanstvena založba Filozofske fakultete Univerze v Ljubljani.
- Neralić, Jadranka (2007). "Judicial Cases in the Court of Maffeo Vallaresso, Archbishop of Zadar (1450–1494)". Review of Croatian History. 3 (1): 271–291.
- Novakovic, Darko (2012). "Epistolarij nadbiskupa Maffea Vallaressa kao vrelo za povijest hrvatskoga humanizma" [The Correspondence of Archbishop Maffeo Vallaresso as Source for the History of Croatian Humanism]. Colloquia Maruliana. 21: 5–24.

Preceded by Polidoro Foscari	Archbishop of Zadar; 1450–1494	Succeeded by Giovanni Robobello
