= Zaccaria Barbaro =

Venetian statesman and diplomat

Zaccaria Barbaro (1422/3 – 29 November 1492) was a Venetian statesman and diplomat. He served the Republic of Venice as ambassador to the courts of Naples and Milan, as well as the papal court. He also purchased the Palazzi Barbaro, which served as the family's primary residence until 1864.

== Life ==
Zaccaria Barbaro was born in 1422 or 1423. Zaccaria Barbaro was the only son of the humanist Francesco Barbaro and Maria Loredan. Like his father, he held the title of Cavaliere and served as Procurator of San Marco. In 1438, Zaccaria’s grandfather Pietro Loredan died while commanding the Po River fleet. Zaccaria’s father Francesco, who was busy defending Brescia, wrote Zaccaria to console his mother and grandmother and urging him not to display him emotions. Zaccaria Barbaro was the cousin of Bishop Ermolao Barbaro and father of another Ermolao Barbaro. He studied under the humanist Lorenzo Cesano. In 1449, he married Clara (Chiara), daughter of the future Doge Andrea Vendramin. and received a dowry of 5000 to 7000 ducats. Some of her dowry was used to buy a palazzo on the Grand Canal at San Vidal.

Zaccaria and Chiara's children were daughters Andrianna and Maria,; Daniele Barbaro (1452–97), who became the grandfather of Patriarch of Aquilea Daniele Barbaro and senator Marcantonio Barbaro; Ermolao Barbaro (1453–93), who became Patriarch of Aquilea; Alvise (1454-1533), Cavalier, Procurator, and Provveditore al Sal; and Girolamo (born 1456) In 1465, Zaccaria purchased the Palazzi Barbaro at San Vidal on the Grand Canal which remained in the family's possession until 1864. (Some sources say the purchase was made in 1457)

== Career ==
Barbaro held public office for the first time in 1443, when he was an avogador del mobile, but his career only took off some two decades later. He was elected one of the Savi di Terraferma in 1468 and again in 1469, 1473, 1474 and 1485. He was one of the Savi del Consiglio in 1478, 1480, 1482, 1484, 1485, 1488 and 1490. He sat on the Minor Council in 1481, 1484, 1486 and 1488 and on the Council of Ten in 1471, 1473–1474 and 1482–1483.

In 1459, Barbaro was the ambassador to King Alfonso V of Aragon. Around 1462, he was appointed a diplomat (oratore) to the Holy See. In 1462, he was one of the ducal electors at the election of Cristoforo Moro. In 1462, Zaccaria Barbaro was sent on a diplomatic mission to Rome and brought his young son Ermolao with him. In 1467, Zaccaria Barbaro was elected Procurator of San Marco. In 1469, Barbaro sent to Verona as ambassador to the Emperor Frederick III. In 1469–1470, he was the podestà and captain of Ravenna.

Zaccaria was Ambassador to the court of King Ferdinand of Kingdom of Naples from 1471–73, with his son Ermolao again accompanying him. Zaccaria was charged with securing Neapolitan aid in Venice's war with the Ottoman Empire. He successfully negotiated the participation of 17 and 14 Neapolitan galleys in 1472 and 1473, respectively. His dispatches from Naples to Doges Niccolo Tron and Nicolò Marcello are stored at the Biblioteca Marciana.

In 1474, Barbaro was one of the electors of Pietro Mocenigo. In 1475, he was elected Avogador de Comun. In 1475–1476, he was captain of Verona.

In July 1476, he was sent as ambassador to the Marquisate of Mantua to attend the marriage of Paolo, daughter of the Marquis Ludovico Gonzaga, with Count Leonhard of Gorizia. In December, he was sent to the Duchy of Milan to express the republic's condolences on the death of Duke Galeazzo Maria Sforza. In 1477, he was one of the provveditori charged with the defense of Friuli against Ottoman raids. In 1478, he was one of the electors of Giovanni Mocenigo. In 1478–1479, he was the podestà of Padua. In 1479, he was sent as ambassador to the Duchy of Ferrara. In 1480–1481, Barbaro served as ambassador to the Papal court of Pope Sixtus I. His son Ermolao acted as his assistant on this appointment. This time the Venetian Senate instructed Zaccaria not to even discuss a league against the Turks. When Ottoman Sultan Mehmet II died in 1481, Pope Sixtus gave thanks with a formal precession to the Church of Santa Maria del Popolo, which Barbaro and the other ambassadors to Rome participated in. Masuccio Salernitano dedicated each of the 50 short stories of ‘’Il Novellino’’, mainly to visiting diplomats like Barbaro or members of the Aragonese nobility. In 1482, Barbaro was one of the Councillors of the Doge. In 1482, after the outbreak of the War of Ferrara, Barbaro loaned the republic 3,000 ducats for its prosecution. In 1482–1483, he served as provveditore of Brescia. In 1483, during the War of Ferrara, Zaccaria served as Provveditore generale al campo (commander of an army). In both years, he was also sent as the republic's ambassador to the condottiero Roberto Sanseverino, who was captain general of the Venetian army. In 1484, he was sent as ambassador to the papal legate Jorge da Costa at Cesena.

In 1485, he was one of the electors of Marco Barbarigo and a correttore of the ducal promissio. That year, he was ambassador to the court of Ludovico Sforza in Milan, with his son again assisting him. In 1487, he was elected procurator de citra of San Marco, a post he still held at the time of his death.

While in Naples from 1471-73, Barbaro probably met Filippo Strozzi, who was acting as a royal banker at this time. In 1476 Zaccaria Barbaro purchased a dozen pairs of Florentine eyeglasses from Strozzi, even though Venice had its own eyeglass-making industry. Barbaro also collected Greek sculpture, and may have come in contact with Tullio Lombardo. In 1491, Zaccaria Barbaro sent an ancient Greek vase to Lorenzo de’Medici, in thanks for Lorenzo’s help in getting Zaccaria’s son Ermolao, the post of Patriarch of Aquileia and tried to get Medici’s protégé Poliziano access to a collection of ancient Greek manuscripts that had been given to Venice by Cardinal Bessarion. Ermolao, accepted the post of Patriarch of Aquileia even though he was serving as ambasador to the Papal Court at the time. It was illegal under Venetian law for ambassadors to accept gifts or positions of foreign heads of state and the Venetian Senate ordered Ermolao to refuse the position. To get his son to comply, the Venetian Senate threatened to revoke Zaccaria's titles and offices and to confiscate his property.Zaccaria died in on 29 November 1492, before the crisis was resolved, and was interred in the church of San Francesco della Vigna.

== Writings, correspondence and bibliophily ==
During his time in Naples, Barbaro wrote a biography of his father, dedicating it to King Ferdinand I of Naples on 15 May 1472. His diplomatic dispatches from Naples, Dispacci da Napoli, have been edited and published.

Among Barbaro's surviving correspondence are letters he wrote to his cousin Ermolao, Pier Candido Decembrio, Francesco Loschi, Lauro Quirini and Domenico de' Domenichi, as well as letters sent to him by his father, Andrea Brenta, Francesco Filelfo and Maffeo Vallaresso.

Barbaro was a collector of Greek and Latin manuscripts.

== Bibliography ==
- Barbaro, Francesco (1999). Griggio, Claudio (ed.). Epistolario. Casa Editrice Leo S. Olschki.
- Beverley, Tessa (1999). "Venetian ambassadors 1454-94: an Italian elite" (PDF). University of Warwick, Department of History.
- Bietenholz, Peter G (2003). Contemporaries of Erasmus a biographical register of the Renaissance and Reformation, v.1-3, A-Z. Toronto Press. ISBN 0-8020-8577-6.
- Biow, Douglas (2002). Doctors, ambassadors, secretaries: humanism and professions in Renaissance Italy. The University of Chicago Press.
- Borsari, Silvano (1964). "Barbaro, Zaccaria". Dizionario Biografico degli Italiani (in Italian). Vol. 6: Baratteri–Bartolozzi. Rome: Istituto dell'Enciclopedia Italiana. pp. 118–119. OCLC 883370.
- Cantů, Cesare (1856). Scorsa di un lombardo negli archivj di Venezia. Civelli.
- Chambers, D. S. (1998). "What Made a Renaissance Cardinal Respectable? The Case of Cardinal Costa of Portugal". Renaissance Studies. 12 (1): 87–108. doi:10.1111/j.1477-4658.1998.tb00039.x. JSTOR 24412631.
- Clément, David (1750). Bibliothéque curieuse historique et critique ou catalogue raisonné des livres difficiles a' trouver : Tome 1-9. Hannover.
- Collegio araldico (1903). Rivista, Volume 1. Presso il Collegio araldico.
- Corazzol, Gigi, ed. (1994). Dispacci di Zaccaria Barbaro (1 novembre 1471–7 settembre 1473). Pubblicazioni degli Archivi di Stato.
- Ilardi, Vincent (2007). Renaissance vision from spectacles to telescopes. American Philosophical Society. ISBN 978-0-87169-259-7.
- Istituto grafico tiberino (1962). Rivista di storia della Chiesa in Italia, Volume 16. Istituto grafico tiberino.
- King, Margaret L. (1985). Venetian Humanism in an Age of Patrician Dominance. Princeton University Press.
- Listri, Massimo; Cunaccia, Cesare M. (2004). Magnificent Italian villasand palaces. Rizzoli. ISBN 978-0-8478-2591-2.
- Marangoni, Michela; Stocchi, Manlio Pastore (1996). Barbaro: Una famiglia veneziana nella storia. Istituto Veneto di Scienze, Lettere ed Arti. ISBN 978-88-86166-34-8.
- Michaud, J Fr and Louis Gabriel (1811). Biographie universelle, ancienne et moderne. Michaud.
- Pullan, Brian (2001). Venice: A Documentary History, 1450-1630. University of Toronto Press.
- Reeves, Margaret; Raiswell, Richard; Crane, Mark (2004). Shell games: studies in scams, frauds, and deceits (1300-1650). Toronto Centre for Reformation and Renaissance Studies. ISBN 0772720231.
- Rose, Hugh James; Rose, Henry John (1857). A new general biographical dictionary, Volume 30. Rizzoli. ISBN 0333760948.
- Setton, Kenneth M. (1976). Papacy and the Levant, 1204-1571. American Philosophical Society. ISBN 0871691140.
- Spreti, Vittorio (1981). Enciclopedia storico-nobiliare italiana, Volume 7. Arnaldo Forni.
- Walsh, R. J. (2005). Charles the Bold in Italy (1467–1477): Politics and Personnel. Liverpool University Press.
- Zeno, Apostolo (1753). Dissertazioni Vossiane di Apostolo Zeno. Ghent University.
