= Niccolò Sagundino =

Greek philologist and writer (1402–1464)

Niccolò Sagundino (Note: Greek: Νικόλαος Σεκουνδινός, Nikolaos Sekoundinos. Latin: Nicolaus Secundinus or Sagundinus. His given name may be anglicized Nicholas. His surname is sometimes spelled Segundino in Italian.) (1402 – March 1464) was a Greek-born Venetian secretary, diplomat and humanist. He wrote numerous letters, as well as religious and philosophical treatises, mostly in Latin.

Originally from Euboea, he was in Venetian service when he was wounded and captured by the Ottomans at the fall of Thessaloniki in 1430. He favoured the union between the Catholic and Orthodox churches and worked for the Papacy. He undertook several Venetian missions to the Ottoman court and to Greek lands, on one of which he suffered a shipwreck that killed several of his immediate family. He died in Venice.

Onesander "translated by Niccolò Sagundino from Greek into Latin", from a Neapolitan manuscript of 1494–1495

== Life ==
Sagundino was born in 1402 to a Greek family in Chalkis, the capital of the Venetian kingdom of Negroponte. His father's name was Manuel. His mother's name is unknown. His family was originally from Constantinople, where they are attested since the 13th century. It had two branches, one at Chalkis and another at Thessaloniki. They were citizens of Venice. His sister or aunt, known only as "R. Sagundino", married Niccolò Aurelio, a Venetian citizen employed in the government secretariat. Their three sons, Marco, Paolo and Pietro, also entered service in the Venetian government; Marco's son, Niccolò Aurelio, eventually rose to the supreme non-patrician office, that of grand chancellor.

Sagundino received a classical education. He was at Thessaloniki, possibly already in the employ of the Venetian state, when the Ottomans captured the city in 1430. He was wounded in the assault and taken prisoner with his family, remaining in captivity for 13 months. After his release, he returned to Chalkis, where from 1434 until 1437 he served Venice as advocatus curiae. Possibly already in 1437 he left Greece for Italy, staying either in Venice or Rome; in 1438, because of his fluency in both Greek and Latin, Sagundino was sent to the Council of Ferrara as an official translator. He remained through 1439, impressing the assembled clergy by his grasp of theology. He favoured the cause of church union.

At the conclusion of the council, the Venetian-born Pope Eugene IV employed Sagundino as an apostolic secretary and from 1441 on as an envoy (nuncio) on missions in Italy and Greece. His activity from 1441 to the end of Eugene's pontificate is not documented, but he is still attested as an apostolic secretary under Pope Nicholas V in December 1452, which means he likely served in the same post throughout the period in question. At the same time, however, he is also attested since 1440 for a ten-year-tenure as chancellor (cancelliere) to the bailo of Negroponte, the Venetian governor of Chalkis; and he was confirmed in office for another decade in 1450. Sagundino was certainly in Chalkis in 1453, where he received the news of the Fall of Constantinople to the Ottomans.

From Chalkis he was sent to accompany the Venetian ambassador, Bartolomeo Marcello, who was sent to Constantinople for negotiations with Sultan Mehmet II. His stay in Constantinople was apparently brief, and he returned to Venice in autumn, bearing letters from Marcello to the Venetian Senate, but then immediately sent to Rome on the express wish of Pope Nicholas V to inform him on Ottoman intentions, and from there to Alfonso V of Aragon, the King of Naples, for the same purpose. In January 1454 Sagundino, while still in Naples, wrote a report on his observations of the Ottomans (Oratio Nicolai Sagundini édita in Urbe Neapoli ad Serenissimum principem et novissimum regem Alfonsum).

At some point thereafter, Sagundino became a secretary to the Doge of Venice. In this capacity he returned to Naples in late 1455 to convey letters from the Venetian government to Alfonso, and stayed there until August 1456, making contact with the numerous humanist scholars resident in the city. In summer 1456, as the plague raged in Venice, he sent his wife and children back to Chalkis. In spring 1457 Sagundino was again sent on diplomatic missions on behalf of the Venetian government, first to Siena, and then to the Pope in Rome and the King of Naples, where he remained for several months, reporting on Alfonso's Italian policies and military preparations, before returning to Venice in early 1458. An envisaged extension of his mission to the King of Navarre did not come to pass. In June 1458 Sagundino undertook yet another mission to Rome, conveying Venice's reasons for its reluctance to participate in the planned anti-Ottoman crusade of Pope Callixtus III.

While still at Rome, in September 1458 Sagundino was appointed chancellor to the Duke of Crete. Sagundino returned to Venice before sailing for Crete; no reports survive on his activity for the year 1459, which he may have spent either in Venice or in Crete. In July 1460, Sagundino decided to bring his family to Crete, but the journey was cut short by a shipwreck that took the lives of his pregnant wife, two sons (including his favourite, Giovanni) and a daughter and destroyed his books and many other possessions. Sagundino himself and five daughters and his son Alvise barely survived by clinging to the side of the vessel that remained afloat. Left destitute and with five unmarried daughters to support and provide dowries for, the Venetian Senate came to his aid, voting him with overwhelming majority a gift of 600 ducats, his reappointment as secretary to the doge with a salary of 200 ducats, and the assurance that Alvise would be employed by the Venetian state.

Following the Ottoman conquest of the Morea and the rapidly progressing conquest of Serbia during the previous years, in March 1461 the Venetian government again resolved to send Sagundino, as an expert of Ottoman affairs, as envoy to Mehmed II to spy out his intentions and assure him of the Republic's friendship and goodwill. Sagundino was to sail first to the Venetian outpost of Modon (Methoni) and then, on board a war galley to Ainos (Enez) and thence over land to Constantinople. Few details are known about his mission. Based on a letter by Sagundino from 1462, where he reports having crossed most of Anatolia, the Venetian envoy likely journeyed east to meet the Sultan, who was at the time campaigning to conquer the Empire of Trebizond. When he met the Sultan, likely in June or July 1461, Sagundino protested the seizure of some border lands in the Morea, but the Ottoman ruler rebuffed this, saying that the territories in question were originally part of the Despotate of the Morea, and thus rightfully his.

In March 1462, Sagundino was sent to the court of Pope Pius II in Rome and Viterbo, ostensibly to report on the libertine morals prevailing in some Venetian monasteries, but chiefly to sound out the Pope's plans for a new crusade and the role of the King of Hungary, Matthias Corvinus, in them. No reports about Sagundino's life survive between the end of his mission to the Papal court in August 1462 and his death at Venice in March 1464, the exact day being uncertain. It is variously reported as 22 or 23 March, with a surviving notice of his death bearing a date of either 22 or 24 March. His son Giovanni having died in the shipwreck of 1460, his heir was his son Alvise (Ludovico) and grandson Niccolò.

== Works ==
Most of Sagundino's writings are in Latin. Few have been published. He left behind 66 letters to his family and other Italian humanists, one of them describing the shipwreck to Cardinal Bessarion, a fellow Greek Catholic. Among his notable correspondents were Ulisse degli Aleotti, Bishop Ermolao Barbaro, Antonio Beccadelli Panormita, Andrea Contrario, George of Trebizond and Zaccaria Trevisan. He wrote a consolatio on the death of Valerio Marcello, the young son of Jacopo Antonio Marcello.

Sagundino made Latin translations of the ancient Greek writers Arrian, Demosthenes, Onesander and Plutarch. He also wrote treatises on philosophy, theology and rhetoric. He dedicated a work on the doctrine of the Trinity, De deo, de unitate essentiae eius et de trinitate personarum, (Note: "On God, the Unity of His Essence and of the Persons of the Trinity".) to Febo Capella, and another on philosophy, De origine et sectis philosophorum, (Note: "On the Origins and Sects of the Philosophers".) to Fantino Coppo, the Venetian governor of Chalkis, whom he used to tutor in philosophy. In 1456, he was commissioned by Enea Silvio Piccolomini (the future Pope Pius II) to write a history of the Ottoman Empire, which resulted in his De familia otumanorum. (Note: "On the Family of the Ottomans". This is the manuscript's title. There are printed versions with variant titles. Talbot 1991 gives Othomanorum familia.)

== Bibliography ==
- Babinger, Franz (1961). Johannes Darius (1414 - 1491), Sachwalter Venedigs im Morgenland, und sein griechischer Umkreis (in German). Munich: Verlag der Bayerischen Akademie der Wissenschaften. OCLC 54905371.
- Caselli, Cristian (2017). "Sagundino, Niccolò". Dizionario Biografico degli Italiani (in Italian). Vol. 89: Rovereto–Salvemini. Rome: Institute of the Italian Encyclopaedia. ISBN 978-88-12-00032-6.
- Caselli, Cristian (2019). "Interpreter, Diplomat, Humanist: Nicholas Sagundinus as a Cultural Broker in the 15th-Century Mediterranean". In Daniëlle Slootjes; Mariette Verhoeven (eds.). Byzantium in Dialogue with the Mediterranean: History and Heritage. Brill. pp. 226–244.
- Di Franco, Matteo (2023). "Greek philosophical miscellany (Cambridge, University Library, MS Dd.4.16)". Cambridge Digital Library. Cambridge University Library. doi:10.17863/CAM.99438.
- King, Margaret L. (1986). Venetian Humanism in an Age of Patrician Dominance. Princeton, New Jersey: Princeton University Press. ISBN 0-691-05465-7.
- King, Margaret L. (1994). The Death of the Child Valerio Marcello. University of Chicago Press.
- Philippides, Marios (2007). Mehmed II the Conqueror and the Fall of the Franco-Byzantine Levant to the Ottoman Turks: Some Western Views and Testimonies. Arizona Center for Medieval and Renaissance Studies.
- Talbot, Alice-Mary (1991). "Sekoundinos, Nicholas". In Kazhdan, Alexander (ed.). The Oxford Dictionary of Byzantium. Oxford and New York: Oxford University Press. p. 1865. ISBN 0-19-504652-8.
