= Paolo Barbo (1416–1462) =

Venetian patrician, diplomat and statesman

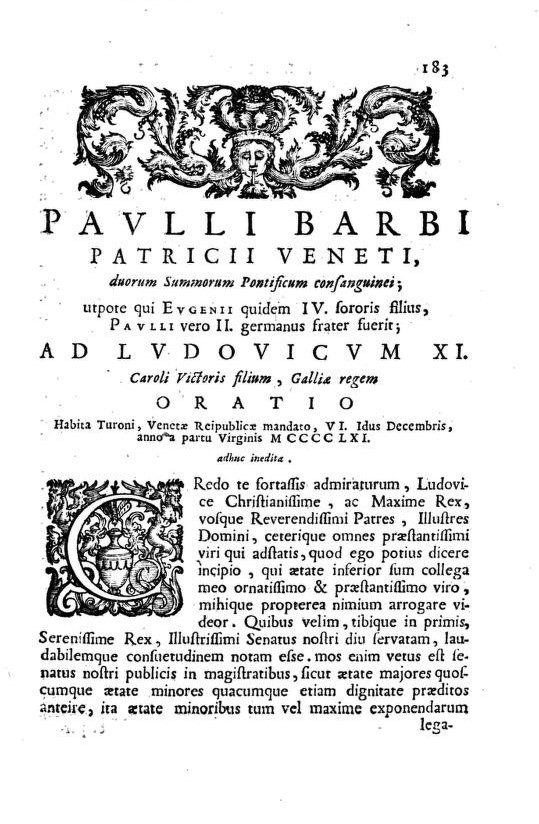
Paolo Barbo's speech to Louis XI in 1461

Paolo Barbo (1416–1462) was a Venetian patrician, diplomat and statesman. An educated humanist of the well connected Barbo and Condulmer families, he was the nephew of Pope Eugene IV and the brother of Pope Paul II.

== Life ==
Born in 1416, Paolo was the eldest son of Niccolò Barbo and Polissena Condulmer. His maternal uncle was Pope Eugene IV, while his younger brother Pietro became Pope Paul II. In his early education, he was a companion of Andrea Fiocchi. In 1433, Eugene granted part of Ragogna to him in fief. In 1434, he married a daughter of a lord of Ventimiglia, the widow of Giacopuzzo Caldira. In 1448, he married a daughter of Maffeo Soranzo. He was presented to the Great Council of Venice for the Balla d'Oro on 10 December 1434.

Paolo served his uncle as a soldier, being knighted for his services in 1439. In 1441, he was granted the county of Albi, but soon lost it to the Colonnas. His brother also served Eugene, eventually becoming a cardinal. On Eugene's death in 1447, Paolo returned to Venice. There he administered his brother's properties and the diocese of Vicenza until 1460. He also became involved in Venetian politics.

Paolo served on the Council of Ten in 1449–1451, 1455, 1457 and 1460–1461. He was one of the Savi di Terraferma in 1450–1455, 1457 and 1460–1461. He sat on the Minor Council in 1452–1453 and 1455–1456. He was one of the ducal electors in 1457 (Pasquale Malipiero) and 1462 (Cristoforo Moro). In 1457–1458, he was one of the Avogadori de Comun and was again holding this office when he died.

From 1450 to 1451, he was the provveditore and captain of Treviso. In 1452, he was a member of the embassy sent to greet the Emperor Frederick III at Padua. He was afterwards made provveditore in Verona. In 1453, during the Milanese War of Succession, he was provveditore of the Venetian army in Lombardy. In 1454, he was named ambassador to the Duchy of Milan and signed the Treaty of Lodi. He took possession of the territories surrendered by Milan in the Bergamasco and Bresciano for Venice. He was forced into exile by the Signoria between 1458 and 1459 for failing to persuade his brother not to accept the diocese of Padua. From 1461 to 1462, he was the ambassador to France.

Paolo was elected podestà of Verona on 10 May 1462, but declined on account of his failing health. He had drawn up a will around 1460 and did so again on 14 November 1462. He was dead by 4 December 1462. He was survived by his son by his second wife, Giovanni.

== Speeches and correspondence ==
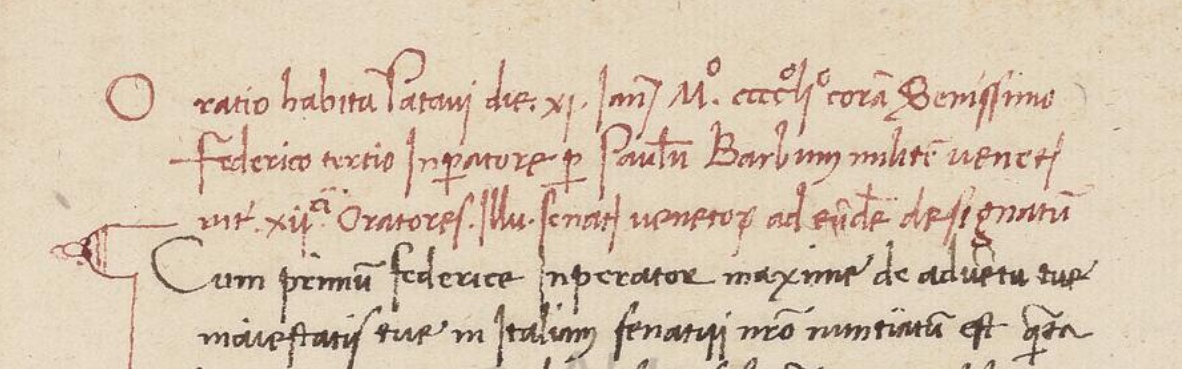
Start of Barbo's speech before the emperor in the Vatican manuscript

Copies of three speeches Paolo delivered are preserved, all in Latin:

- Oratio ad imperatorem Federicum III
- Oratio in traditione insignium Bartolomeo de Colionibus
- Oratio ad Ludovicum Francorum regem

The first of these was delivered on 11 January 1452 on the occasion of his embassy to the emperor at Padua. It is preserved in four Italian manuscripts. Barbo implicitly recognizes the universal power of the emperor and ends by paying homage to the empress, Eleanor of Portugal. The second was delivered at Brescia in 1455 when he and Giovanni Moro handed command of the army to the condottiere Bartolomeo Colleoni. Only an excerpt survives and the manuscript labels it an oratiuncula. The third speech was delivered before King Louis XI of France at Tours on 8 December 1461, during his embassy. It was edited by Agostino Valier and published in 1719.

There are surviving letters addressed to him by Andrea Fiocchi, Niccolò Barbo, Ludovico Foscarini and Maffeo Vallaresso. His learning was praised by Flavio Biondo, Poggio Bracciolini, Francesco Contarini, Bernardo Giustiniani and Zaccaria Trevisan. In addition, a certain Aurelio Trebanio dedicated his De libertate to him and Porcelio Pandone some of his poetry.

== Bibliography ==
- Beverley, Tessa (1999). Venetian Ambassadors, 1454–94: An Italian Elite (PDF) (PhD dissertation). University of Warwick.
- Borsari, Silvio (1964). "Barbo, Paolo". Dizionario Biografico degli Italiani (in Italian). Vol. 6: Baratteri–Bartolozzi. Rome: Istituto dell'Enciclopedia Italiana. OCLC 883370.
- King, Margaret L. (1985). Venetian Humanism in an Age of Patrician Dominance. Princeton University Press.
- King, Margaret L. (1994). The Death of the Child Valerio Marcello. University of Chicago Press.
- Kristeller, Paul Oskar (1985). "An Unknown Letter of Giovanni Barbo to Guarino". Studies in Renaissance Thought and Letters. Vol. 2. Edizioni di storia e letteratura. pp. 259–263.
- Pallotti, Riccardo (2022). "Federico III d'Asburgo in Italia tra politica e retorica". In Anne Huijbers (ed.). Emperors and Imperial Discourse in Italy, c. 1300–1500: New Perspectives. Publications de l'École française de Rome. pp. 157–198.
- Zenobi, Luca (2023). Borders and the Politics of Space in Late Medieval Italy: Milan, Venice, and their Territories. Oxford University Press.
