= Girolamo Donato =

Italian diplomat and humanist

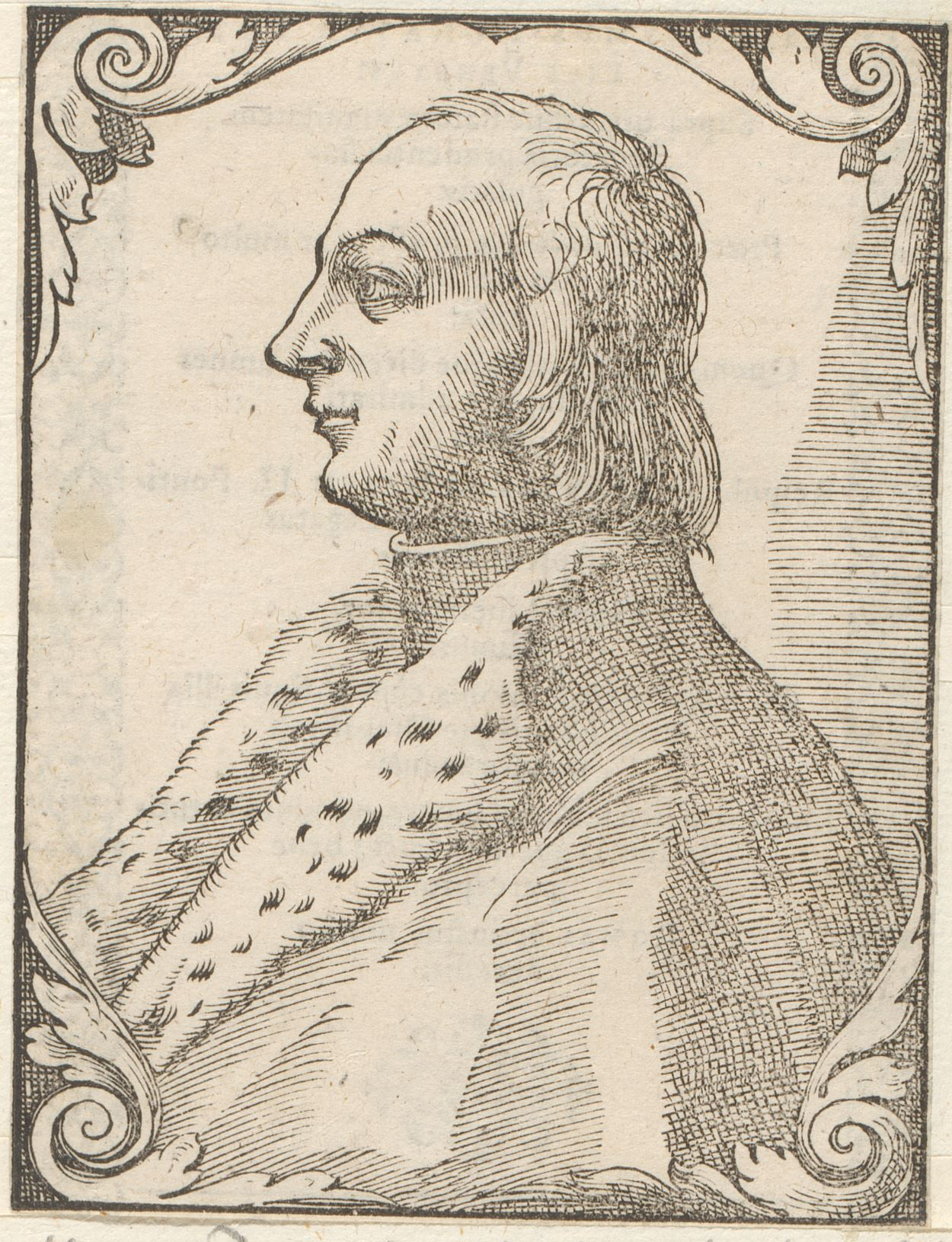
Portrait of Girolamo Donato by Tobias Stimmer

Girolamo Donato, also spelled Donati, Donado or Donà (c. 1456 – 20 October 1511), was a Venetian diplomat and humanist. He made important translations of ancient Greek philosophy and the Greek Fathers into Latin. He served the Republic of Venice on embassies abroad on twelve separate occasions, most importantly at Rome four times, and also served as a governor of Ravenna (1492), Brescia (1495–97), Cremona (1503–04) and Crete (1506–08).

== Family and education ==
Girolamo was the son of Antonio di Andrea and Lucia di Bernardo Balbi of the patrician class. His father belonged to the dalle Rose branch of the Donà family. His birth is usually given as around 1456 or before 1457. Giovanni degli Agostini places his birth in 1457, but also gives his age as 57 at his death. He is recorded as 18 years old when presented to the avogadori di Comun on 22 or 27 November 1474. He married Maria di Ludovico Gradenigo and passed his entire career in public service, for which reason he seems to have died poor.

Donato learned Latin and Greek in childhood. His Greek tutor was Theodore Gaza. He studied philosophy and theology under Nicoletto Vernia at the University of Padua, receiving his degree of doctor of arts on 16 June 1478. He was studying law at Padua in 1489, when he held the office of rector jointly with Marco Dandolo. At Padua, Donato "was generally held to be one of the most learned of the Peripatetics who flourished in the city". His speech on the subject of the unmoved mover in the academic year 1480–81 inspired Elia del Medigo to compose his Quaestio de primo motore.

== Public career ==
Donato's first public charge was as ambassador to the court of René II, Duke of Lorraine, in 1483. A string of ambassadorships followed: to the Republic of Genoa in 1484; to the Kingdom of Portugal in 1486; to Maximilian I, elected Holy Roman Emperor, in 1488; to the Duchy of Milan in 1489–90; and to the Holy See in 1491–92. In 1491, Pope Innocent VIII nominated Donato's friend, Ermolao Barbaro, to the office of Patriarch of Aquileia. As it was illegal under Venetian law for ambassadors to accept gifts or positions of foreign heads of state, Donato was ordered to try to persuade Barbaro to renounce the appointment and return to Venice, but Barbaro did not.

In 1492, Donato was elected podestà and captain of Ravenna. In 1494–95, he served as one of the avogadori di Comun (public prosecutors). Between 1495 and 1497, he was podestà and vice-captain of Brescia. There he hired the Albanian scholar Marino Becichemo as a tutor for his son Filippo. While still podestà of Brescia, he went on an embassy to the Republic of Lucca in 1496. During 1497–1499, he reprised his role as ambassador to the Holy See. Afterwards he was visdomino (Venetian representative) in the Duchy of Ferrara, but there is some disagreement concerning the dates of his visdominato: he appears to have been in Ferrara in July 1499, but other sources do not place him there until 1500 or even February 1501. From March to July 1501, he returned as ambassador to the Emperor-elect Maximilian.

Donato was one of the 41 electors in the election of the doge in 1501; Leonardo Loredan was elected. He served as ambassador to the Kingdom of France in 1501–02. In 1503–04, he was podestà of Cremona. In the latter year, he was elected to be one of the Savi del Consiglio (wise men of the council). He was selected for the embassy of congratulation to newly elected Pope Julius II that, for political reasons related to the downfall of Cesare Borgia, did not set out until March 1505. Later that year he joined the Ducal Council. In 1506, he was appointed Duke of Crete. He wrote a letter describing the Cretan earthquake of 1508. His office ended in 1508 and in 1509 he rejoined the Ducal council.

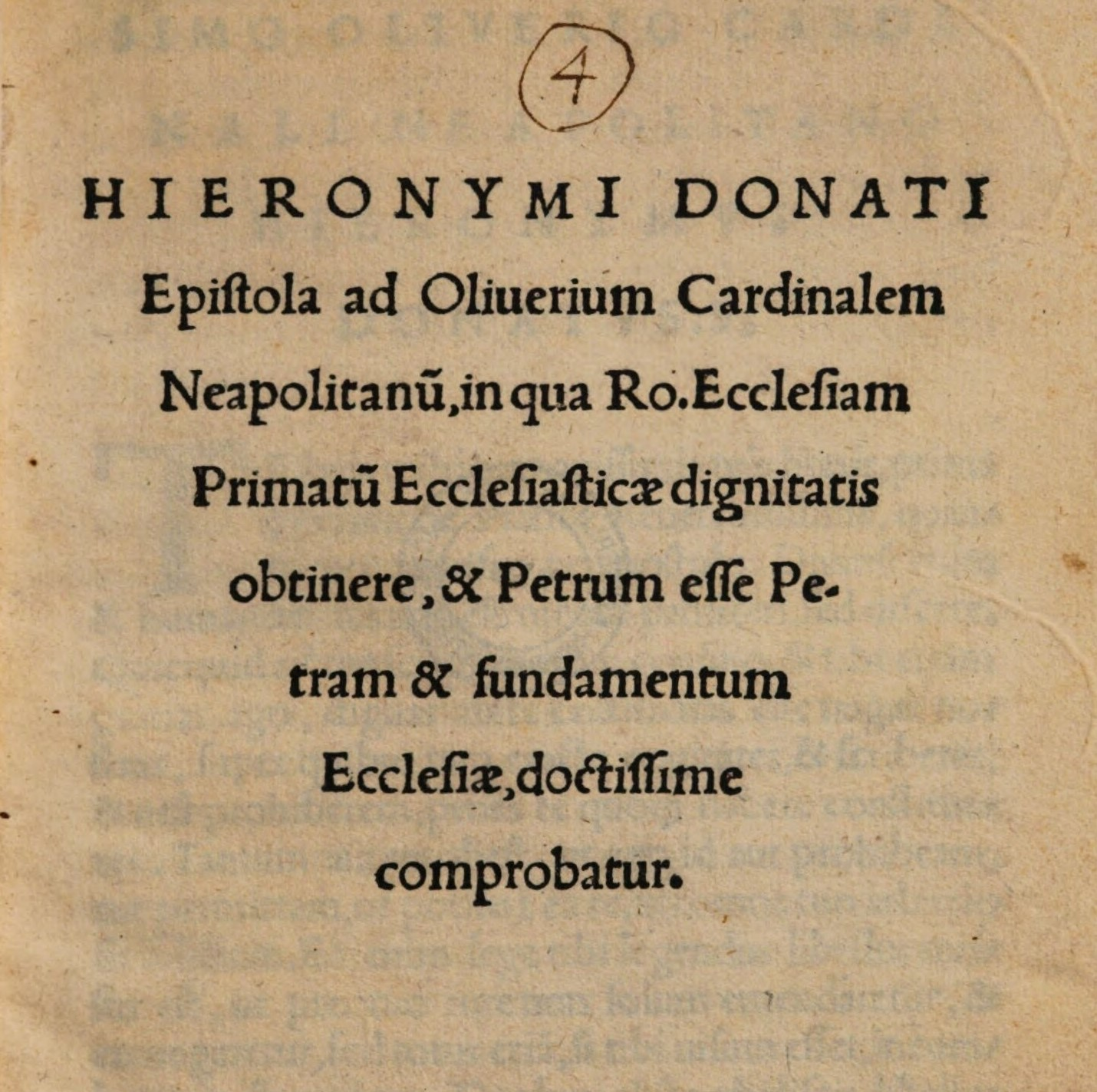
Titlepage of Donato's published letter to Cardinal Carafa

In April 1509, Venice was placed under interdict by Julius II and targeted by the forces of the League of Cambrai. Donato led the embassy that negotiated the lifting of the excommunication in February 1510. He continued on as ambassador to the Holy See, and, when the League fell apart, negotiated the creation of the Holy League allying Venice with the Holy See, Spain and England on 5 October 1511. He was proclaimed a hero in Venice. Already ill at the time, he died in Rome two weeks later. The Great Council awarded pensions to his widow and his nine surviving sons. According to Agostini, a Frenchman hearing of his death remarked, "He was a man of letters before he was a statesman; and he distinguished himself equally in both professions."

== Writings and reputation ==
Titlepage of the Apologeticus ad Graecos de principatu Romanae sedis (1525)

Donato wrote in both Latin and Greek. Some of his works are lost. His original works include speeches, political tracts and poems. He wrote two theological treatises defending the primacy of the Holy See and the dual procession of the Holy Spirit against Greek Orthodoxy: Apologeticus ad Graecos de principatu Romanae sedis and De processione Spiritus Sancti contra Graecum schisma. The first was written in Greek while he was Duke of Crete and addressed to the Cretans. He translated it into Latin for Julius II and this version was published by his son. In a letter addressed to Cardinal Oliviero Carafa, Donato responds to some criticisms of the Apologeticus, but the letter from Carafa is lost.

The speech which Donato gave before the emperor during his embassy of 1501 was printed at Venice in June of that year in both Latin and vernacular Italian. The speech which he gave before King Louis XII of France after his arrival as ambassador in October 1501 was printed at Rome by Aldo Manuzio in December.

He made many translations from Greek to Latin. His first published work was a translation of Alexander of Aphrodisias, published at Brescia by Bernardino Misinta on 13 September 1495. This was the first translation of Alexander into Latin. It was reprinted at Venice in 1502. In 1496, Misinta published a translation John Chrysostom. He also translated John of Damascus and Dionysius the Pseudo-Areopagite. Seven letters by Donato have been published. He maintained a correspondence with Ermolao Barbaro, Pietro Bembo, Marco Dandolo, Pietro Dolfin, Marsilio Ficino, Domenico Grimani, Giovanni Lorenzi, Aldo Manuzio, Giovanni Pico della Mirandola, Angelo Poliziano and Marcantonio Sabellico.

Numerous contemporaries praised his learning: Jacopo Boldù, Egnazio, Desiderius Erasmus, and Francesco Pisani. Others dedicated works to him: Gasparino Borro's Commentum super tractatum spherae mundi, Aldo Manuzio's editions of Dioscorides and Nicander, Marcantonio Sabellico's De situ venetae urbis, Pierio Valeriano's Lusus. Donati, Bernardo Bembo and Ermolao Barbaro have been called the best representatives of late 15th-century Venetian humanism.

== Bibliography ==
- Barnes, Jonathan (2009). "Review: Girolamo Donato and Alexander of Aphrodisias". International Journal of the Classical Tradition. 16 (1): 58–74. doi:10.1007/sl2138-009-0091-9 (inactive 12 July 2025). JSTOR 40388861.
- Beverley, Tessa (1999). Venetian Ambassadors, 1454–94: An Italian Elite (PDF) (PhD dissertation). University of Warwick.
- Engel, Michael (2019). "Elijah Delmedigo". In Edward N. Zalta (ed.). The Stanford Encyclopedia of Philosophy.
- Gaisser, Julia Haig, ed. (1999). Pierio Valeriano on the Ill Fortune of Learned Men: A Renaissance Humanist and His World. University of Michigan Press. ISBN 0-472-11055-1.
- King, Margaret L. (2014) [1985]. Venetian Humanism in an Age of Patrician Dominance. Princeton University Press.
- Rigo, Paola (1991). "Donà, Girolamo". Dizionario Biografico degli Italiani (in Italian). Vol. 40: Di Fausto–Donadoni. Rome: Istituto dell'Enciclopedia Italiana. ISBN 978-88-12-00032-6.
