= Febo Capella =

Venetian scholar

Febo Capella (c. 1420 – 1482) was a Venetian official and humanist scholar, who ascended to the highest non-patrician office, that of grand chancellor.

== Life ==
The exact date of Febo Capella's birth is unknown, but based on his career he was likely born around 1420. His family were Venetian citizens, and Capella himself entered public service, being first attested in 1442 as a ducal notary and filling the post of chancellor for the Venetian governor of Cattaro (Kotor). In 1443–44 he was a member of the embassy of Francesco Barbaro to the Duke of Milan. Later he was appointed secretary to the savi di terraferma (board responsible for Venice's mainland possessions), the Council of Ten, and finally ducal secretary (i.e., to the Doge of Venice) in the 1450s.

As ducal secretary, Capella is attested as leading diplomatic missions on his own, to the King of Naples René of Anjou (1455), the Holy Roman Emperor Frederick III (1459), and to the Republic of Florence (1460). He was elected to the office of grand chancellor, the highest post available to a commoner, on 28 May 1480, but held it for less than two years, as he died in early 1482.

== Works ==
Capella was a member of the contemporary circle of Venetian humanist scholars, including several of commoner origin. Some of his correspondence with them survives, and several of them—Marsilio Ficino, Nicholas Leonicus Thomaeus, Marino Becichemo, and Niccolò Sagundino—dedicated some of their works to him.

== Sources ==
- King, Margaret L. (1986). Venetian Humanism in an Age of Patrician Dominance. Princeton, New Jersey: Princeton University Press. ISBN 0-691-05465-7.
- Olivieri, Achille (1975). "Capella, Febo". Dizionario Biografico degli Italiani (in Italian). Vol. 18: Canella–Cappello. Rome: Istituto dell'Enciclopedia Italiana. pp. 470–471. ISBN 978-88-12-00032-6.
