= Bernardo Bembo =

Italian humanist and statesman (1433–1519)

Bernardo Bembo (19 October 1433 – 28 May 1519) was a Venetian humanist, diplomat and statesman. He was the father of Pietro Bembo.

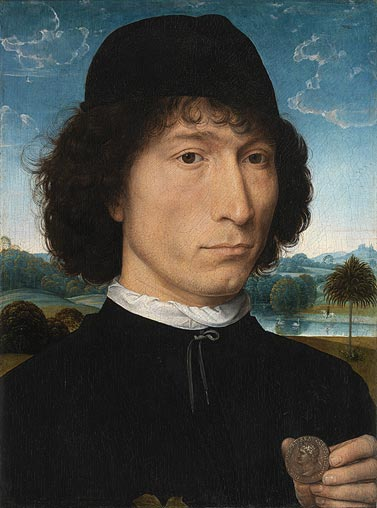
Hans Memling's Portrait of a Man with a Roman Medal (c. 1480) may be a portrait of Bembo

== Paduan years ==
Bembo was the son of Nicolò Bembo of the Bembo family and Elisabetta di Andrea Paruta. He studied philosophy at the University of Padua, earning a doctorate of arts under the guidance of Gaetano da Thiene on 10 November 1455. He continued to study law thereafter, finally earning his doctor of both laws degree on 19 January 1465. He continued to live in Padua until 1468. During his Paduan period, he visited Rome as part of a congratulatory embassy to Pope Calixtus III (1455), delivered congratulations to Doge Cristoforo Moro on behalf of the law students (1462) and delivered the eulogy at the funeral for Bertoldo d'Este (8 March 1464). He married his first wife, Elena di Matteo of the Morosini family, in 1462. Widowed, he married a second time to Elena Marcello, the mother of Pietro.

== Diplomat and statesman ==
Bembo was the Venetian ambassador to the court of Henry IV of Castile in 1468–1469. On 16 July 1471, he was commissioned as ambassador to Charles the Bold, Duke of Burgundy. On 18 June 1472, he signed the Treaty of Péronne, creating a five-year alliance between Venice and Burgundy. After a three-year stay at the Burgundian court, he was appointed ambassador to Sigismund, Archduke of Austria, on 23 August 1474. This mission, if it was in fact undertaken, was not fruitful and he returned to Venice before the end of the year. There he was one of the 41 ducal electors chosen to select the doge. Pietro Mocenigo was elected.

Bembo was appointed ambassador to Florence on 23 December 1474. In this capacity, he promised Lorenzo de' Medici to do his best to procure the return of the bones of Dante Alighieri to Florence. He returned to Venice in 1476, but was reappointed in July 1478 following the Pazzi conspiracy, presumably because of his friendship with Lorenzo. His second ambassadorship in Florence ended in 1480.

Between 1481 and 1483, Bembo was the podestà and capitano del popolo of Ravenna. In this capacity he renovated the tomb of Dante, commissioning Pietro Lombardo to carve a portrait for it. For this he was praised in an epigram of Cristoforo Landino. The latter part of his term in Ravenna was taken up by the War of Ferrara, which began in May 1482. On 9 July 1483, Bembo was appointed ambassador to England. On 13 February 1484, he was made ambassador to France. No details about either mission survive, although Domenico Malipiero in his Annali says that Bembo went to England. He had returned to Venice by early 1485, when he was elected one of four ambassadors to pay homage to Pope Innocent VIII. He served a first term as avogadore di comun (public prosecutor) in 1486, a role he reprised another five times (1494–1495, 1500, 1504–1505, 1509–1510, 1512–1513).

Bembo was tried for fiscal improprieties and acquitted by the Council of Ten on 22 October 1487. He returned to Rome in November 1487 as the Venetian representative at the papal arbitration of the Republic's dispute with Sigismund of Austria, which had led to the brief War of Rovereto in the Tyrol. He was still in Rome in October 1488, when he was elected podestà of Bergamo. He served for two years (1489–1490), during which he revised the municipal statutes. In October 1492, he was chosen by the Senate to be a member of the zonta (an extraordinary commission of the senate), a position in which he served uninterrupted for many years. On 1 October 1496, he joined the Council of Ten. He conveyed to the council the offer of Tristano Savorgnan to poison Charles VIII of France, then invading Italy. The Council rejected the proposal. His term was cut short by his appointment as visdomino of Ferrara in July or August 1497.

As visdomino, Bembo reported on the anti-Venetian hostility of Ercole d'Este, Duke of Ferrara, yet he also forwarded to Venice Ercole's offer to mediate the end of the Pisan War, in which Venice had taken the side of Pisa against Florence. Ercole issued his award, detrimental to Venice, on 26 April 1499. Bembo reported to the College in Venice on 21 July 1499. On 15 November, he was elected to the Dieci Savi. In 1500, he rejoined the Council of Ten and was its head in March and May. Between August and December 1500, he was a governatore delle entrate.

On 30 September 1501, Bembo was a ducal elector in the election that chose Leonardo Loredan. From 10 April 1502 until mid-1503 he was podestà of Verona, in conjunction with which he was also to act as ambassador to King Louis XII of France, who was invading Italy. For this reason he was away from Verona between 15 June and 28 August 1502, first at Pavia and from 27 July at Milan. He describes the triumphal entry of Louis XII in Milan in a letter to Marino Sanuto the Younger. In Verona, he entertained Francesco Gonzaga, Marquis of Mantua, and his wife, Isabella d'Este.

== Final embassy and last years in Venice ==
On 11 November 1503, Bembo was selected for the embassy of congratulation to Pope Julius II on his election, but for political reasons related to the downfall of Cesare Borgia it did not set out until March 1505. In the interim he served as avogadore di comun. He wrote an account of this embassy valuable for its description of Rome's antiquities. This was his last embassy and he spent the rest of his life in Venice except for some short visits to Padua. He was never very wealthy, but he did own land in the Terraferma near Padua.

From October 1505 until August 1506, Bembo sat on the Council of Ten. He left to take up the post of provveditore of fodder, and the Council elected him to its zonta (extraordinary commission) on 8 August. His term as avogadore in 1510–1511 following the battle of Agnadello was eventful. With Marino Giustinian and Alvise Gradenigo, he proposed the review of Antonio Grimani's exile that brought back the military to Venice at a time of need. He also sat on the commission that tried the Paduans for rebellion, and launched the trial of Angelo Trevisan before the Great Council on 20 February 1510.

In August 1510, Bembo rejoined the Council of Ten. He fought hard for but lost election as podestà of Padua in November. Marino Sanuto considered scandalous to find such "ambition ... in the aged". It is likely that financial need more than ambition motivated Bembo. He often appears as an insolvent debtor of the state in these years. On 1 December, he joined the Ducal Council. On 11 July 1511, he was elected again to the Council of Ten. This time he was unable to fully take part in its proceedings and was so ill for a time that Pietro came to visit him. From 10 May 1512 until 23 May 1513 he was avogadore. He was elected to the Council of Ten for a last time on 9 October and served one year. His last term was active and he was frequently head of the council. In late 1514 he withdrew from public life.

The failure in December 1514 of his son's mission on behalf of Pope Leo X to Venice seems to have dispirited Bembo. He rejected re-election to the zonta of the Senate. He fell ill on 19 May 1519. Pietro learned of his father's illness at Bologna, but did not arrive in Venice before his death on 28 May. He was buried in the church of San Salvador on 30 May.

== Correspondence and writings ==
Bembo corresponded with Lorenzo de' Medici, Cristoforo Landino, Dante III Alighieri, Ermolao Barbaro, Pietro Barozzi, Baldassarre Castiglione, Marsilio Ficino, Francesco Filelfo, Lauro Quirini, Marcantonio Sabellico, Antonio Vinciguerra and Jacopo Zeno. He wrote mostly speeches and letters in Latin. Sanuto praises him as "most learned, great in humanitas" and says that he continued to write until his last hour, always "well-composed and full of all erudition". Among his surviving writings are:

- Gratulatio ad Christophorum Maurum pro clarissimo divini atque humani iuris scolasticorum ordine Patavini habita (1462), his congratulation to Cristoforo Moro
- Oratio in adventu cardinalis Sancti Angeli legati apostolici (1460)
- Oratio in adventu Jacobi Zeni episcopi Patavini (1460)
- Oratio in funere Bertholdi marchionis Estensis, his eulogy for Bertoldo d'Este, with a consolatio to his widow Jacoba (1464)
- Orationes ad Innocentium VIII (1487–1488), three orations delivered before Innocent VIII during his second embassy to him
- a zibaldone

Bembo amassed a large library. He has been seen, along with Girolamo Donato and Ermolao Barbaro, as representative of late 15th-century Venetian humanism. More than any other Venetian humanist he was familiar with the thinking current at Florence.
