= Visdomino of Ferrara =

A visdomino (cf. vidame, vicedominus) was the representative of the Republic of Venice in the city of Ferrara from the late 13th century until 1509.

The first reference to a Venetian visdomino at Ferrara comes from about 1280. The early visdomini were purely Venetian functionaries. Their original task was to monitor smuggling and report any to the Ferrarese authorities. Gradually they expanded their power, frequently interfering in Ferrarese affairs. By the 15th century, the Venetians regarded the visdomino as possessing a customary right to seize contraband. This had its origins in a treaty of 1240 that forbade Ferrara from receiving merchandise direct from the sea. The public authority of the visdomino was finally regularized in the treaty of 1455 between Venice and the Duchy of Ferrara. In this treaty, Ferrara recognized the authority of the visdomino to seize contraband. The visdomino was expelled during the War of Ferrara (1482–1484), but the Peace of Bagnolo that ended the war confirmed the office. After Venice was defeated in the battle of Agnadello on 14 May 1509, Duke Alfonso d'Este expelled the visdomino permanently.

== List of visdomini ==
The dates are the dates of entering office.

- Niccolò di Pietro Barbo (14 September 1450)
- Leonardo Sanuto (1458)
- Giovanni di Girolamo da Canal (23 November 1470)
- Francesco di Paolo Contarini (22 February 1472)
- Girolamo di Bernardo Zane (10 June 1475)
- Antonio di Andrea Venier (13 March 1477)
- Benedetto di Pangrazio Giustinian (5 October 1478)
- Gianvettore di Giovanni Contarini (28 November 1479)
- Luca di Marco Zeno (10 November 1484)
- Pietro di Lorenzo Donà (5 April 1487)
- Vinciguerra di Marco Dandolo (21 August 1488)
- Antonio di Marco Erizzo (26 January 1490)
- Bartolomeo di Matteo Vitturi (25 August 1491)
- Pietro di Luca Duodo (11 May 1493)
- Gianfrancesco di Alvise Pasqualigo (25 October 1494)
- Giovanni di Pietro Mocenigo (10 March 1496)
- Bernardo di Niccolò Bembo (12 July 1497)
- Girolamo di Antonio Donà (16 July 1499)
- Cristoforo di Lorenzo Moro (19 February 1501)
- Marco di Bertuccio Zorzi (October 1503)
- Alvise da Mula (August 1504)

== Sources ==
- Dean, Trevor (1993). "After the War of Ferrara: Relations between Ferrara and Ercole d'Este, 1484–1505". In D. S. Chambers; C. H. Clough; M. E. Mallett (eds.). War, Culture and Society in Renaissance Venice. Hambledon. pp. 73–98.
- King, Margaret L. (1985). Venetian Humanism in an Age of Patrician Dominance. Princeton University Press.
- Mallett, Michael; Shaw, Christine (2012). The Italian Wars, 1494–1559: War, State and Society in Early Modern Europe. Pearson.
