= Giovanni Domenico Spazzarini =

Italian statesman, diplomat, and historian (1429-1516/19)

Giovanni Domenico Spazzarini (1429-1516 or 1519) was an Italian statesman, diplomat, and historian from Padua; he is best known for his chronicle of events of the War of the League of Cambrai.

Born in Padua, he trained in jurisprudence (law) and was appointed to the position of Cancellieri of Padua in 1488. In 1493, he was sent, along with a Jacopo Zabarella (likely relative of the Paduan philosopher (1533–1589) of the same name), as the representative (ambassador) from Padua to Venice. In 1494 he was named to the Paduan council of nobles. The podesta of Verona, Bernardo Bembo, attempted to recruit him as chancellor for that city, but Spazzarini refused. He wrote in Latin: Storia Veneta that includes his recount of events of the War of Cambrai. The ever-secretive Venetians became suspicious of his revelations and imprisoned him briefly in 1509.
