= Benintendi Ravegnani =

Benintendi Ravegnani (Chioggia, at the earliest 1318 – Venice, July 1365) was a Venetian public secretary and diplomat, whose career culminated with the highest non-patrician office, that of grand chancellor, which he held from 1352 to his death in 1365. Prior to that, he was appointed to the post of vice grand chancellor in 1349. A humanist and friend of Petrarch, he was also a historian, continuing Andrea Dandolo's history of Venice.

== Sources ==
- Pozza, Marco (2016). "Ravegnani, Benintendi". Dizionario Biografico degli Italiani (in Italian). Vol. 86: Querenghi–Rensi. Rome: Institute of the Italian Encyclopaedia. ISBN 978-88-12-00032-6.
