= Ermolao Barbaro =

Italian Renaissance scholar

Ermolao Barbaro depicted in the painting Pilgrims Meet the Pope by Vittore Carpaccio (c. 1492)

Ermolao Barbaro, in Latin Hermolaus Barbarus (21 May 1454 – 14 June 1493), was a Venetian Renaissance humanist, diplomat and churchman. From 1491, he was the patriarch of Aquileia. He is often called "the Younger" to distinguish him from his cousin, Ermolao Barbaro the Elder.

== Education ==
Ermolao Barbaro was born in Venice, the son of Zaccaria Barbaro, and the grandson of Francesco Barbaro. He was also the uncle of Daniele Barbaro and Marcantonio Barbaro His mother was Clara, the daughter of doge Andrea Vendramin.

Much of Barbaro's early education was outside of Venice, accompanying his father, who was an active politician and diplomat. He received further education in Verona with an uncle, also named Ermolao. In 1462 he was sent to Rome, where he studied under Pomponius Laetus and Theodorus Gaza. By 1468 he had returned to Verona, where Frederick III awarded him a laurel crown for his poetry. Barbaro began attending the University of Padua in 1471, where he received a Doctorate of Arts 1474 and a Doctorate of Law 1477. He was appointed professor of philosophy there in 1477. Two years later he revisited Venice, but returned to Padua when the plague broke out in his native city.

== Career ==
Barbaro had an active political career, though he resented these duties as a distraction from his studies. In 1483 he was elected to the Senate of the Republic of Venice. He was twenty when he gave the funeral oration for Doge Nicholas Marcello in 1474.

In 1486, he was sent to the court of the Duchy of Burgundy in Bruges. In 1488 he held the important civil post of Savio di Terrafirma. In 1489 he was appointed ambassador to the Duchy of Milan. In 1490, Barbaro was appointed to the Avogadoria de Comùn and then appointed Ambassador to the Holy See. In 1491, Pope Innocent VIII, nominated him to the office of Patriarch of Aquileia.

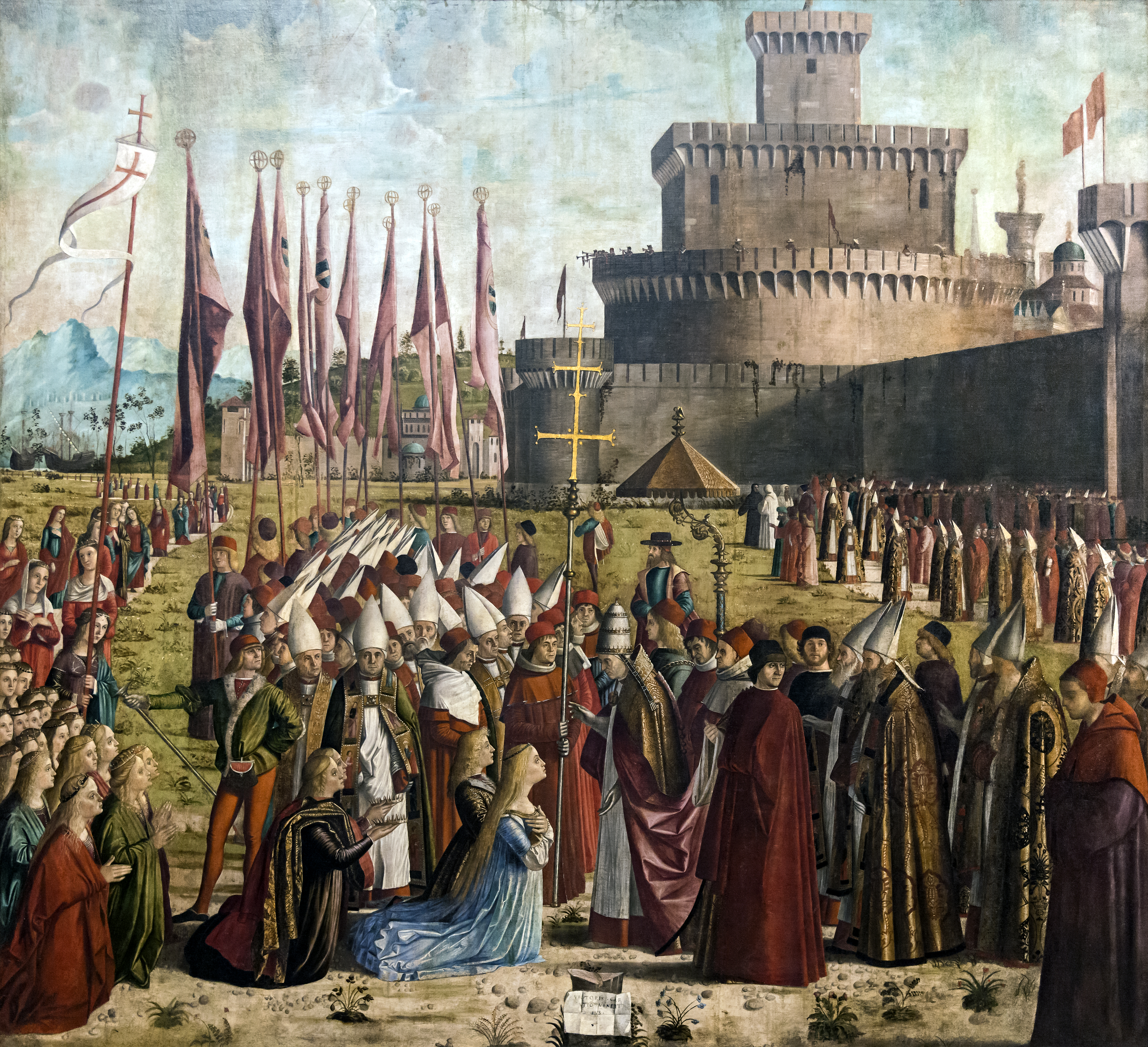
Carpaccio's Pilgrims Meet the Pope. Barbaro in red in centre.

It was illegal under Venetian law for ambassadors to accept gifts or positions of foreign heads of state. There was also a dispute between Venice and the Papacy as to who should nominate Patriarchs of Aquileia. Venice believed that the Pope, in appointing Barbaro without Venetian support, and ignoring the candidate Venice had nominated was violating Venice's rights. Barbaro was accused of treason and the Venetian Senate ordered him to refuse the position. His loyalty was questioned.

Ermolao's friend, Girolamo Donato, and his father, Zaccaria Barbaro, were ordered try to persuade him to renounce the appointment and return to Venice. Pope Innocent and his successor Alexander VI threatened to excommunicate Barbaro if he resigned as Patriarch of Aquileia. The Venetian Senate revoked Barbaro's appointment as ambassador and exiled him from Venice. They threatened the same for his father, Zaccaria, as well as confiscation of both men's property, but Zaccaria died shortly afterwards.

Barbaro then lived in a Roman villa on the Pincian Hill belonging to his brothers Daniele and Ludovico. He died there of the plague in 1493 and was buried at the church of Santa Maria del Popolo. Ferdinando Ughelli mentions an inscription to Barbaro there, but it was lost by 1758. Valeriano wrote a tribute to Barbaro.

== Scholarly works ==
Barbaro edited and translated a number of classical works: Aristotle's Ethics and Politics (1474); Aristotle's Rhetorica (1479); Themistius's Paraphrases of certain works of Aristotle (1481);Castigationes in Pomponium Melam (1493).

Barbaro's work De Officio Legati was representative of a revolution in the conduct of diplomacy which took place during the Renaissance. In appears to have been written in 1490, while Barbaro was resident ambassador to Rome. It was the first work to express the idea that an ambassador was a servant of the state. It gives general guidelines for conduct, no specific advice and says ambassadors should be above reproach. De Officio Legati also said that public officials should not accept any office or title from foreign governments.

His work, De Coelibatu was less influential, but Barbaro's Castigationes Plinianae, published in Rome in 1492 by Eucharius Silber, was perhaps his most influential work. In this discussion of Pliny's Natural History Barbaro made 5000 corrections to the text. The work was written in only twenty months and dedicated to the newly elected Pope Alexander VI. Castigationes Plinianae was considered by Barbaro's contemporaries to be the most authoritative work on Pliny. Even before his death, he was considered a leading authority on the Greek and Latin works of antiquity. Erasmus frequently cited Barbaro's works, often with respect.

Barbaro's letters to Giovanni Pico were widely circulated. In addition to Pico, Barbaro corresponded with many humanists, including Marsilio Ficino, Pietro Foscari, Marcantonio Sabellico, Angelo Poliziano, and Giorgio Merula.

Much of Barbaro's work was published after his death: In Dioscuridem Corollarii libri quinque, a work on Dioscorides, in 1516, his translations of Aristotle in 1544, and Compendium Scientiae Naturalis in 1545.

== Publications ==
- Compendium scientiae naturalis ex Aristotele (in Latin). Venezia: Comin da Trino. 1545.
- In Caii Plinii Naturalis historiae libros castigationes (in Latin). Basel: Johann Walder. 1534.
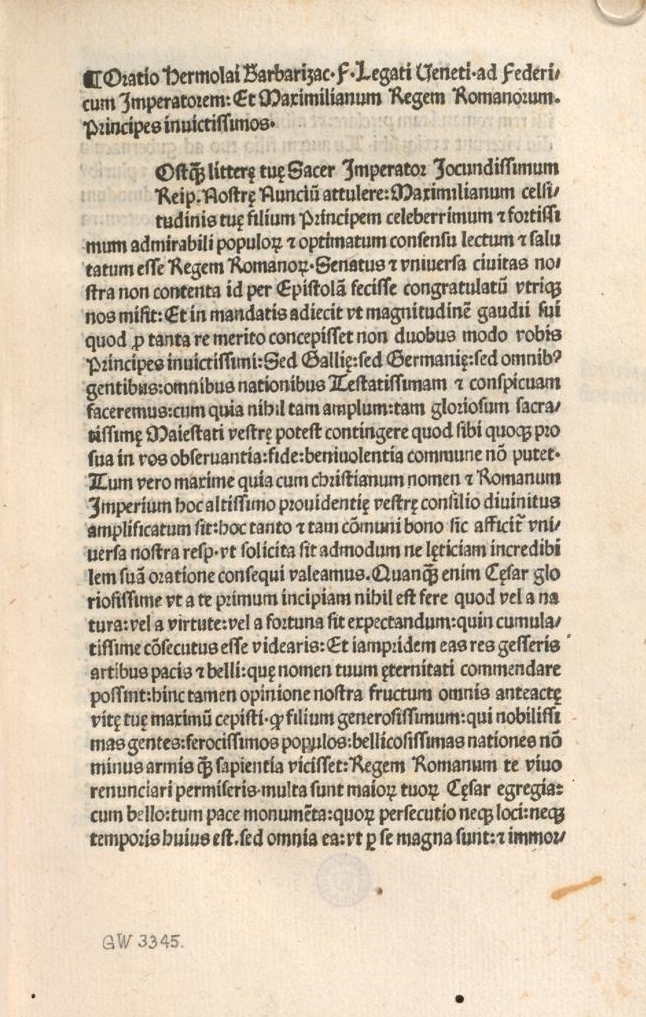
Oratio ad Federicum imperatorem, c. 1487: incipit

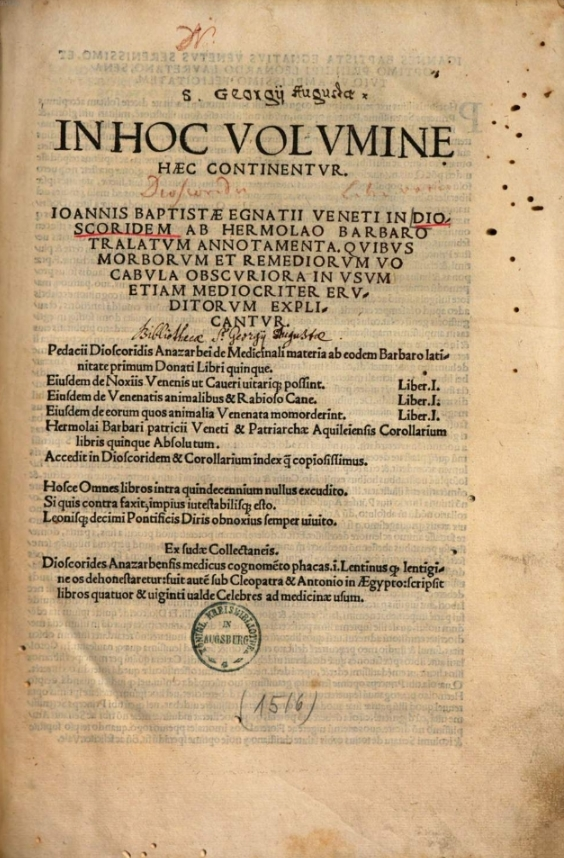
Dioscorides, version by Barbaro, 1516: title

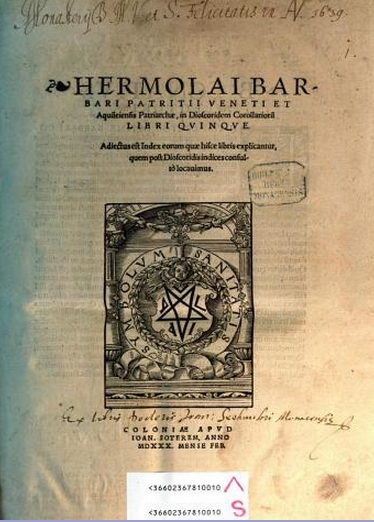
In Dioscoridem corollariorum libri V, 1530 edition

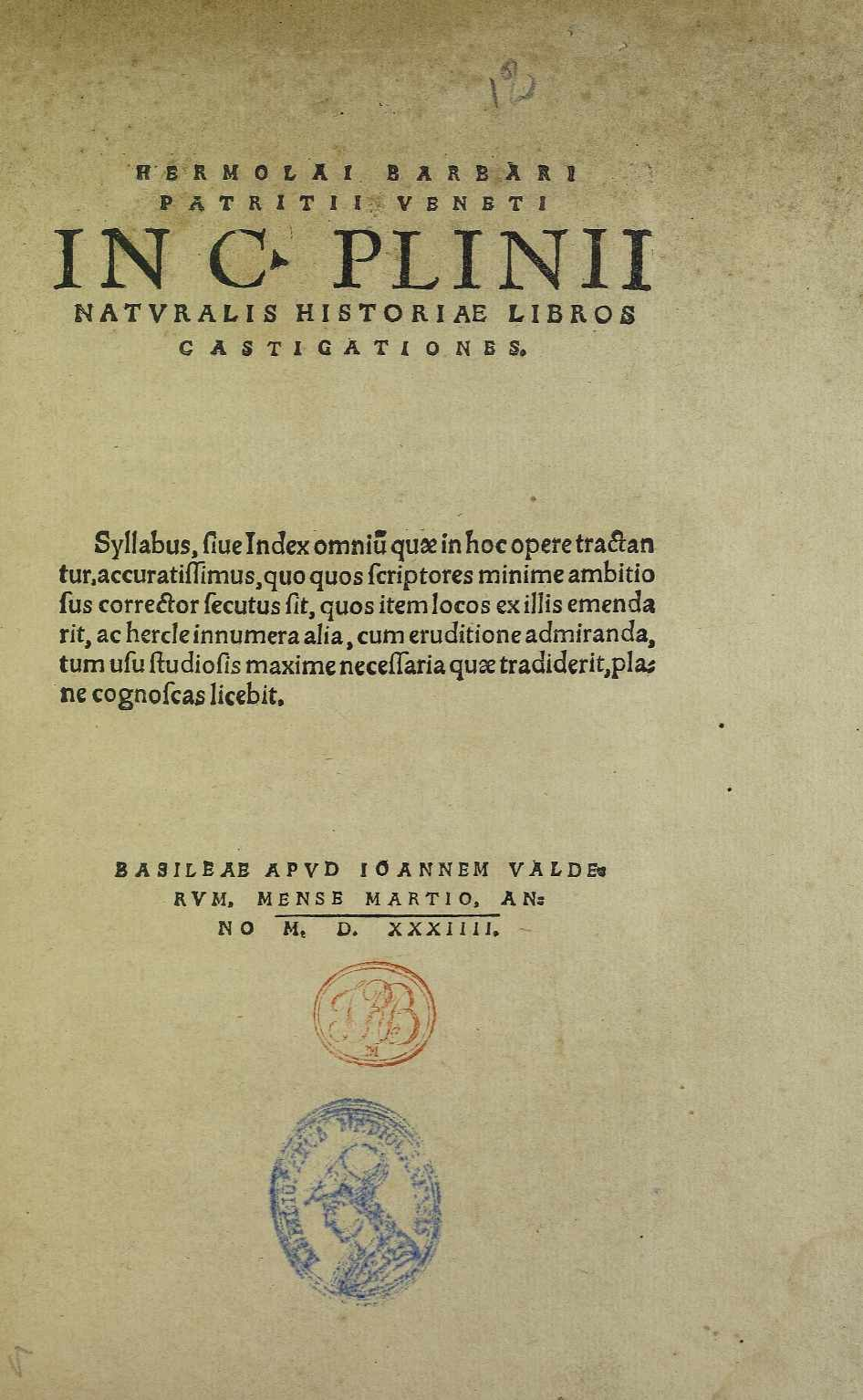
In Caii Plinii Naturalis historiae libros castigationes, 1534
