= Angela Nogarola =

Italian poet and writer (1380–1436)

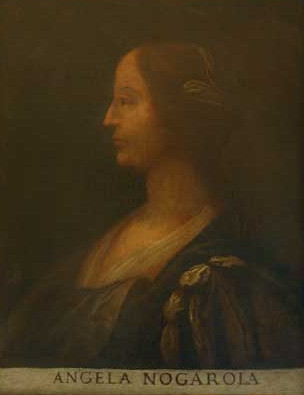
- Born: 1380
- Died: 1436 (aged 55–56)
- Occupations: Poet and writer

Angela Nogarola (1380–1436) was an Italian poet and writer.

== Biography ==
Nogarola was born in Verona, the daughter of knight Antonio Nogarola. In 1396, she married Count Antonio d'Arco. She was the aunt of philosophers Isotta and Geneva Nogarola. She lived in Verona and Vicenza.

Nogarola received training from Antonio Loschi, probably becoming his pupil. She devoted herself to writing and poetry, particularly on religion and in Latin, even after marriage, composing some eclogues and obtaining success and wonder. Informal correspondence was exchanged with Pandolfo III Malatesta, Giangaleazzo Visconti, Niccolò Facino, Matteo Orgian and Francesco Barbavara.

Her style, influenced by Francesco Petrarca, was appreciated but considered far from the classic.

One of her portraits in oil on canvas from the 18th century is kept in the rectorate of the University of Bologna.

== Works ==
- Opera
- Epistolae et carmina
- Angelæ et Zeneveræ Nogarolæ Epistolæ et carmina
- Dominus Angelus Veronensis de Nogarolis ad dominum Antonium de Luscis
- L'egloga di Angela Nogarola a Francesco Barbavara
- Liber de Virtutibus
