= Marino Contarini =

Italian Roman Catholic prelate

Most Reverend Marino Contarini
- Bishop of Treviso
- Church: Catholic Church
- In office: (1453–1455
- Predecessor: Ermolao Barbaro the Elder
- Successor: Marco Barbo
- Previous post: Bishop of Kotor (1430–1453)

Personal details
- Died: 1455 Treviso, Italy

Marino Contarini (died 1455) was a Roman Catholic prelate who served as Bishop of Treviso (1453–1455) and Bishop of Kotor (1430–1453).

== Biography ==
On 10 July 1430, Marino Contarini was appointed during the papacy of Pope Martin V as Bishop of Kotor. On 19 November 1453, he was appointed during the papacy of Pope Nicholas V as Bishop of Treviso. He served as Bishop of Treviso until his death in 1455.

== External links and additional sources ==
- Cheney, David M. "Diocese of Treviso". Catholic-Hierarchy.org. (for Chronology of Bishops)^{self-published}
- Chow, Gabriel. "Diocese of Treviso (Italy)". GCatholic.org. (for Chronology of Bishops)^{self-published}
- Cheney, David M. "Diocese of Kotor (Cattaro)". Catholic-Hierarchy.org. (for Chronology of Bishops)^{self-published}
- Chow, Gabriel. "Diocese of Kotor (Montenegro)". GCatholic.org. (for Chronology of Bishops)^{self-published}

Catholic Church titles
Preceded by	Bishop of Kotor; 1430–1453	Succeeded by Bernardo da Venezia
Preceded by Ermolao Barbaro the Elder	Bishop of Treviso; 1453–1455	Succeeded by Marco Barbo
