= Isotta Nogarola =

Italian writer (1418–1466)

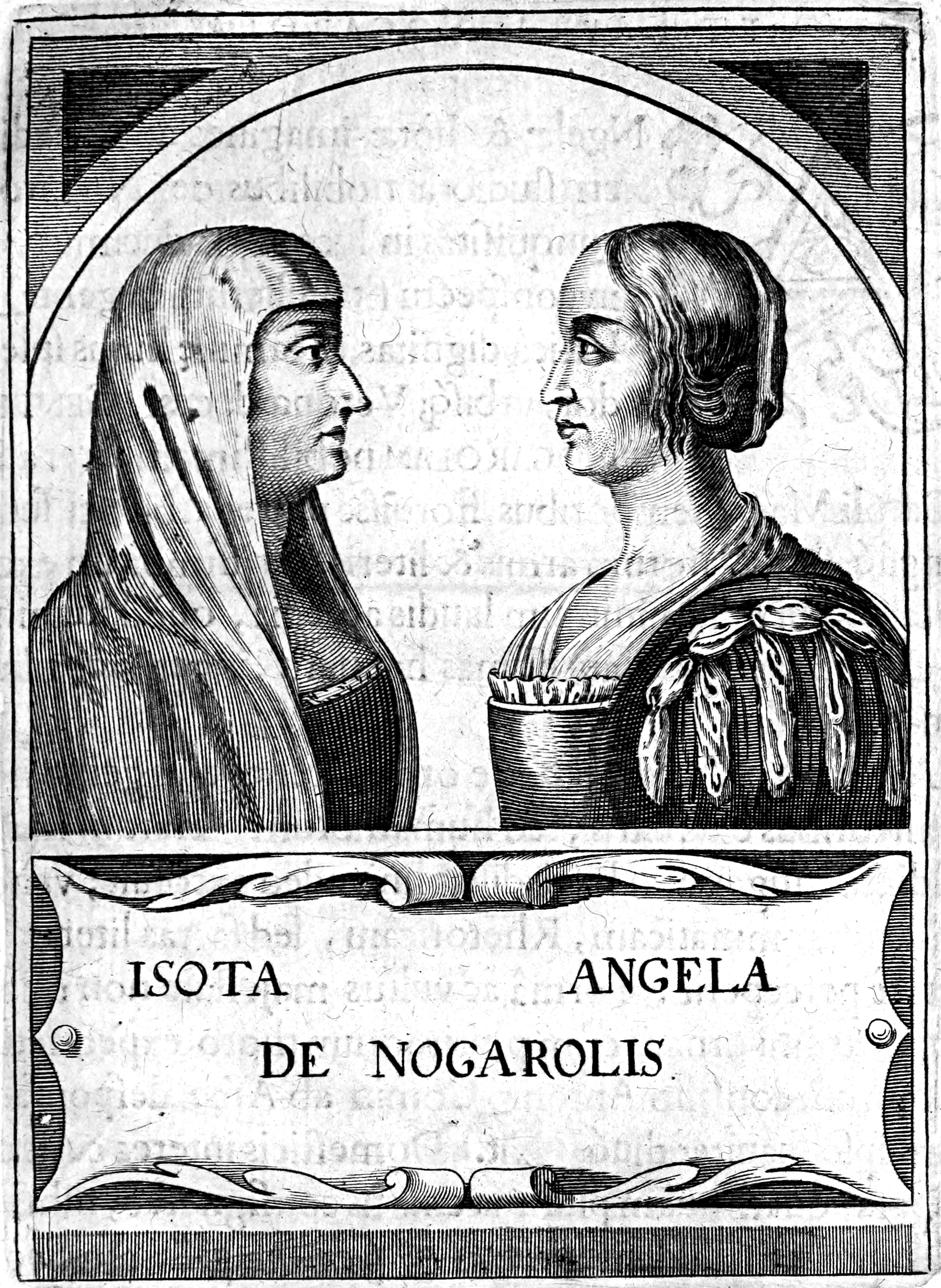
Depiction of Isotta Nogarola with her aunt, poet Angela Nogarola

Isotta Nogarola (1418–1466) was an Italian writer and intellectual who is said to be the first major female humanist and one of the most important humanists of the Italian Renaissance. She inspired generations of artists and writers, among them Lauro Quirini and Ludovico Foscarini, and contributed to a centuries-long debate in Europe on gender and the nature of women.

Nogarola is best known for her 1451 work De pari aut impari Evae atque Adae peccato (trans. Dialogue on the Equal or Unequal Sin of Adam and Eve). She also wrote many other dialogues, poems, speeches, and letters, twenty-six of which survive.

== Early intellectual life ==
Nogarola was born in Verona, Italy, in 1418. Her parents, Leonardo Nogarola and Bianca Borromeo, were a well-to-do couple who would go on to conceive a total of four boys and six girls. Nogarola was also the niece of the Latin poet Angela Nogarola.

Despite being illiterate herself, Nogarola's mother ensured that her children all received fine humanist educations, including her daughters. The children were taught the rhetoric necessary for public speaking, and many of them delivered public speeches and conducted debates in Latin, as was customary among well-educated men of that era. Both Isotta and her younger sister Ginevra became renowned for their classical studies, although Ginevra gave up writing upon her marriage in 1438. Nogarola's early letters demonstrate her familiarity with Latin and Greek authors, including Cicero, Plutarch and Diogenes Laertius, as well as Petronius and Aulus Gellius.

Nogarola's first tutor was Martino Rizzoni, who was himself taught by Guarino da Verona, one of the leading humanists at that time. Nogarola proved an extremely able student, attaining respect for her eloquence in Latin, and by the age of 18, she had become famous.

== Hostile reception of humanistic work ==
The reception of her activities was condescending, with her work considered primarily to be that of a woman and not belonging to the intellectual world into which she sought entry. Niccolo Venier thought the whole female sex should rejoice and consecrate statues to Isotta as the ancient Egyptians had to Isis. Giorgio Bevilaqua claimed never before to have met a learned woman. For her own part, Nogarola was concerned that her fame did not come from the sheer volume of intelligence she seemed to possess, but from the novelty of her gender, and despite her erudition, she had little choice but to defer to the contemporary social norms by deprecating herself as an ignorant woman.

In 1438, after receiving praise from Guarino da Verona, Nogarola wrote him a letter, calling him a "wellspring of virtue and probity." She likened herself to a Cicero to his Cato, and a Socrates to his Plato. This news spread throughout Verona and inspired much ridicule from women in the city. A year passed without a reply, and she wrote again to Guarino, saying:

"Why... was I born a woman, to be scorned by men in words and deeds? I ask myself this question in solitude... Your unfairness in not writing to me has caused me much suffering, that there could be no greater suffering... You yourself said there was no goal I could not achieve. But now that nothing has turned out as it should have, my joy has given way to sorrow... For they jeer at me throughout the city, the women mock me."

This time, Guarino da Verona replied in a letter, saying: "I believed and trusted that your soul was manly... But now you seem so humbled, so abject, and so truly a woman, that you demonstrate none of the estimable qualities I thought you possessed." Upon the death of her father the next year, she travelled with her family to Venice, where she remained until 1441. However, anonymous accusations were made against her, alleging incest, male and female homosexuality, and licentiousness. “An eloquent woman is never chaste,” was one such allegation made against her.

== Retreat to Verona and religious scholarship ==
Confronted with this hostile reception, Nogarola appears to have decided that devoting herself to literary studies meant the sacrifice of friendship, fame, comfort, and sexuality. In 1441, she returned to her property in Verona to live quietly, possibly with the company of her mother. She cut short her career as a secular humanist, instead turning to the study of the sacred letter. In 1451, she published her most famous and perhaps most influential work, De pari aut impari Evae atque Adae peccato (trans. Dialogue on the Equal or Unequal Sin of Adam and Eve). In this literary dialogue, she discussed the relative sinfulness of Adam and Eve. Using a reductio ad absurdum argument, Nogarola demonstrated that women could not be held to be weaker in nature and more culpable in original sin.

Isotta died in 1466, aged 48. She was honoured posthumously by two sonnets praising her chastity, but not her learning.

== Known works ==
As well as her famous dialogues, Nogarola's works include a biography of St. Jerome, a letter urging a Crusade (1459), and a consolatory letter to a father after the death of his child.
