= Grand chancellor (Republic of Venice) =

The grand chancellor (Italian: cancelliere grande) was one of the most senior offices in the Republic of Venice. Alone among the senior magistracies, which were reserved for the Venetian patriciate, it was held by common citizens (cittadini).

== History and functions ==
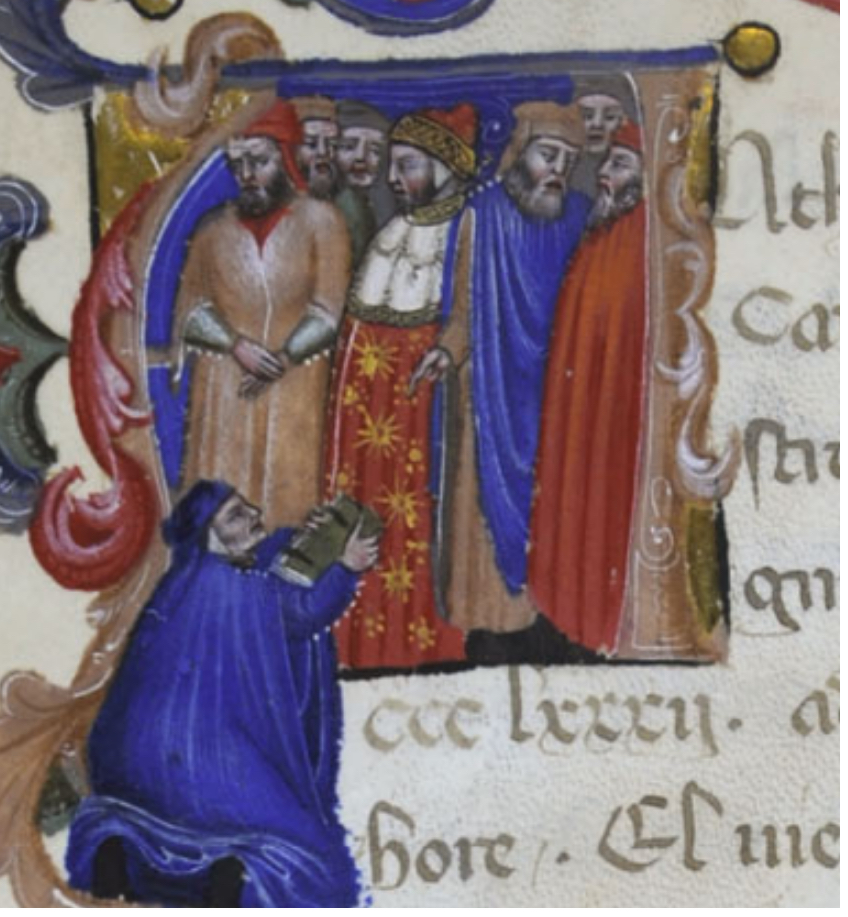
Illuminated initial showing Grand Chancellor Rafaino Caresini, on his knees, handing a copy of his chronicle to Doge Antonio Venier, from a manuscript in the Biblioteca Marciana

The origins of the title are unknown. It appeared along with the chancery of the Doge of Venice, and is first mentioned in the sources in 1268. It was the highest office held exclusively by cittadini, the non-noble citizens of the Republic of Venice, and as a result it was also the de facto head of this social class, just as the Doge was for the patriciate. The holder of the office enjoyed unusual privileges: the title of Excellency, purple clothing like the Doge's, and a very high place in the order of precedence—right after the Doge, the ducal councillors, and the Procurators of Saint Mark.

The grand chancellor was elected by the Great Council of Venice, and supervised the Doge's chancery and the archives of the Venetian state. Exceptionally for Venetian magistracies, tenure was for life, as for the Doge and the Procurators of Saint Mark. The chancellor had the right to enter all governing councils of the Republic, along with the Doge. He kept the registers of elections to the councils, was responsible for the appointment of notaries, and kept the state treaties with foreign powers in a locked closet (the Secreta), to which only he had access.

His deputies were the reggente and vice-reggente of the chancery. The chancery comprised a hundred clerks, likewise recruited exclusively from the non-noble citizenry; The historian Ioana Iordanou stresses that "[t]hese were different from other public officers in a significant way: recruitment was subject to rigorous public examinations, formal training, and, more often than not, continuous professional development". After an examination, they attained the rank of extraordinary clerk (notaio straordinario), and after five years progressed to become ordinary clerk (notaio ordinario). The clerks were often entrusted with sensitive missions on behalf of the state, including as residents in embassies abroad (though not as ambassadors). Higher levels still were as secretary to the Venetian Senate and ultimately as secretary to the Council of Ten, posts which were attained after further years of service or successful missions abroad.

== List of grand chancellors ==
- Corrado Ducato from 13 July 1268
- Tanto de Tanti from 20 March 1281
- Jacopo Bertoldi from 10 September 1314
- Nicolò Pistorino from 25 April 1323
- Benintendi Ravegnani from 1 July 1352
- Rafaino Carissimi from 25 June 1365
- Pietro Rossi from 11 September 1390
- Desiderato Lucio from 10 January 1394
- Giovanni Vito from 23 April 1396
- Nicolò Ghirardi from 8 May 1402
- Giovanni Piumazzo from 12 July 1405
- Francesco Bevazzano from 28 June 1428
- Francesco della Siega from 18 November 1439
- Alessandro dalle Fornaci from 19 August 1470
- Febo Capella from 20 May 1480
- Luigi Dardani from 22 December 1510
- Francesco Fasolo from 23 March 1511
- Giampietro Stella from 26 January 1516
- Nicolò Aurelio from 22 August 1523
- Girolamo Dedo from 17 July 1524
- Andrea de Franceschi from 17 September 1529
- Lorenzo Rocca from 20 January 1551
- Francesco Ottoboni from 19 April 1559
- Andrea Frizier from 25 December 1575
- Giovanni Formenti from 8 January 1580
- Andrea Suriano from 20 January 1586
- Domenico de Vico from 17 May 1595
- Francesco Girardi from 15 February 1604
- Bonifaccio Antelami from 30 May 1605
- Leonardo Ottoboni from 14 November 1610
- Giovambattista Padavino from 15 November 1630
- Marco Ottoboni from 25 May 1639
- Marcantonio Businello from 1 September 1646
- Agostino Vianoli from 12 May 1651
- Giovambattista Ballarin from 15 November 1660
- Domenico Ballarin from 14 November 1666
- Pietro Businello from 1 November 1698
- Giovambattista Nicolosi from 8 August 1713
- Angelo Zon from 28 June 1717
- Giovanni Maria Vincenti from 16 February 1726
- Giovanni Domenico Imberti from 24 February 1745
- Orazio Bertolini from 8 May 1746
- Giovanni Colombo from 18 December 1766
- Giovan Girolamo Zuccato from 8 March 1772
- Giovanni Antonio Gabrieli from 7 June 1784 to 12 May 1797 (Fall of the Republic of Venice)

== Sources ==
- Chambers, David Sanderson; Fletcher, Jennifer; Pullan, Brian, eds. (2001). Venice: A Documentary History, 1450-1630. University of Toronto Press. ISBN 978-0-802084248.
- Brown, Horatio F. (1887). Venetian Studies. London: Kegan Paul, Trench & Co. OCLC 458907462.
- Da Mosto, Andrea (1937). L'Archivio di Stato di Venezia. Indice Generale, Storico, Descrittivo ed Analitico. Tomo I: Archivi dell' Amministrazione Centrale della Repubblica Veneta e Archivi Notarili (in Italian). Rome: Biblioteca d'arte editrice. OCLC 772861816. Archived from the original on 2021-11-13.
- Iordanou, Ioanna (2019). Venice's Secret Service: Organizing Intelligence in the Renaissance. Oxford: Oxford University Press. ISBN 978-0-19-879131-7.
- Lane, Frederic Chapin (1973). Venice, A Maritime Republic. Baltimore, Maryland: Johns Hopkins University Press. ISBN 0-8018-1445-6.
