= Francesco Barbaro (politician) =

Italian politician (1390–1454)

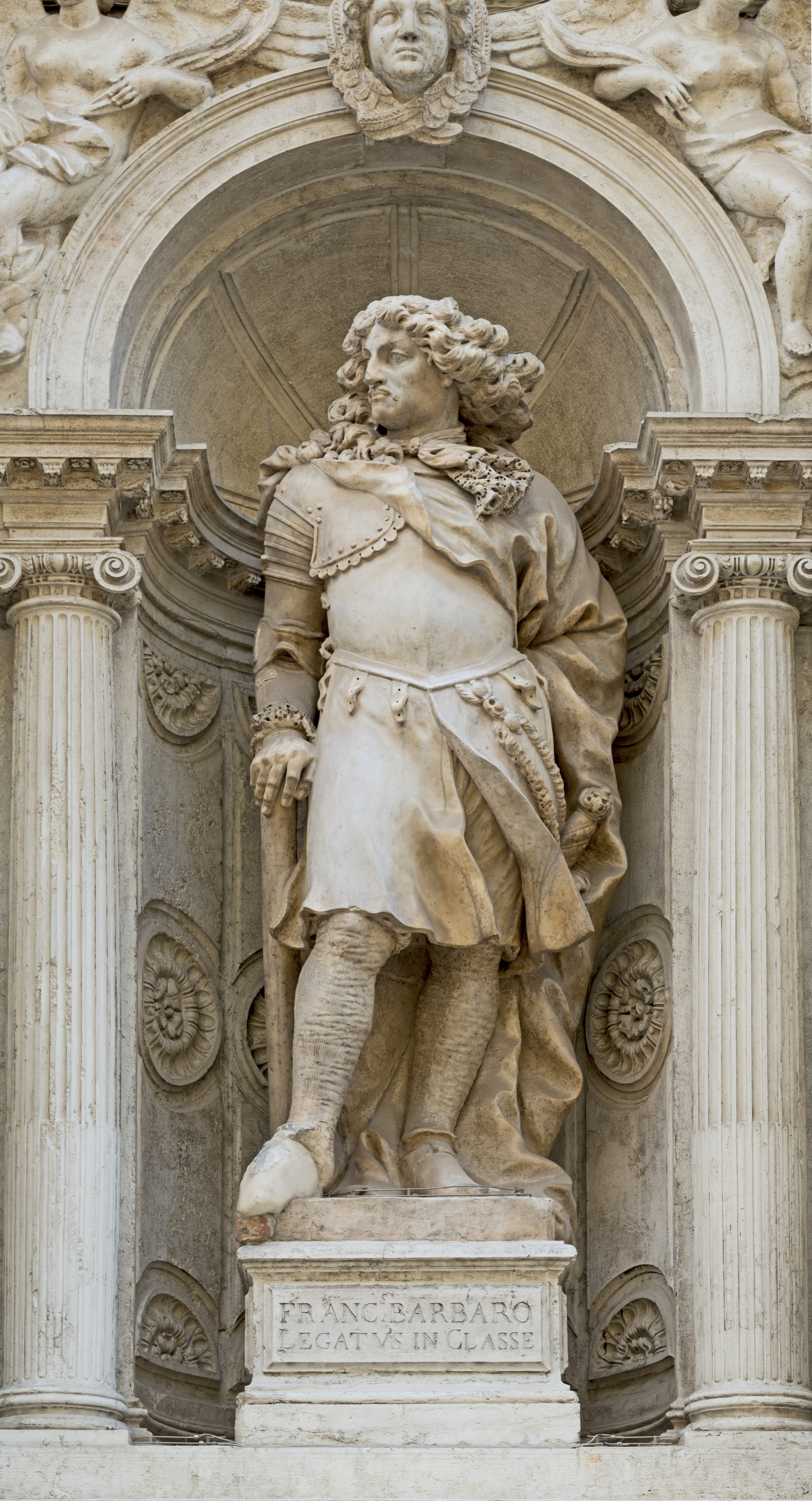
Francesco Barbaro

Francesco Barbaro (1390–1454) was an Italian politician, diplomat, and humanist from Venice and a member of the patrician Barbaro family. He is interred in the Church of the Frari, Venice.

== Family and education ==
Francesco Barbaro was the son of Candiano Barbaro, uncle of Ermolao Barbaro, grandfather of the younger Ermolao Barbaro, and great-great grandfather of Marcantonio Barbaro and Daniele Barbaro. Francesco's father died in 1391 and Francesco was raised by his older brother Zaccaria. In 1419, Franceso married Maria Loredan, daughter of Procurator Pietro Loredan. Francesco and Maria had five daughters and one son, Zaccaria Barbaro, who was born in 1422.

Francesco Barbaro was a student at the University of Padua and studied under John of Ravenna, Gasparino Barzizza, Vittorino da Feltre, Guarino Veronese, and Giovanni Conversini.

== Career ==
In 1419, Barbaro was appointed senator of the Republic of Venice. He was elected governor of Como in 1421, though he declined the post. Later that year he accepted the governorship of Trivigi. He served as governor of Vicenza in 1423, of Bergamo in 1430, and of Verona in 1434.

In 1426 Barbaro was sent as a special envoy to the Papal Court to try to persuade Pope Martin V to ally with Venice against Milan. In 1428, the Pope assembled a congress at Ferrara, which ended the war, with Francesco Barbaro being one of Venice's representatives there. That year Barbaro also served as ambassador in Ferrara and Florence. In 1433, Barbaro represented Venice at the court Emperor Sigismund in Bohemia, where he and the other envoys were knighted by the Emperor. At Emperor Sigismund's request, Francesco Barbaro attempted to soothe relations between the Emperor and the Hussites. Eugenius IV also employed Barbaro in his negotiations with the Emperor.

Barbaro served as Venetian ambassador to Mantua in 1443, Ferrara in 1444, and Milan in 1446.

As governor of Brescia, from 1437 to 1440, Francesco Barbaro was able to reconcile the two rival factions of Avogadri and Martinenghi and he attained a great reputation in his defense of the city against the forces of the Duke of Milan, led by Niccolò Piccinino. Barbaro's success was commemorated by Giovanni Battista Tiepolo in his painting The Glorification of the Barbaro Family. Barbaro was succeeded as Captain of Brescia by his brother-in-law Giacomo Loredan.

Francesco Barbaro was governor of Verona again in 1441, and later was appointed governor of Padua and Governor General of Friuli in 1445. In 1444 he arbitrated a border dispute between the cities of Verona and Vicenza. He finally returned to Venice as a state councilor and was elected Procurator of St Mark's in 1452. Francesco Barbaro also served as Luogotenente of Friuli from 1448 to 1449. In 1453, Barbaro's friend, Filippo da Rimini, serving as chancellor of Venetian Corfu, sent him an account of the fall of Constantinople. When Barbaro died the following year, da Rimini delivered a funeral oration.

== Writings ==
Barbaro engaged in research, collection and translation of ancient manuscripts and served as a patron to George of Trebizond and Flavio Biondo.

Early in his career, he translated two of Plutarch’s Lives, those of Aristides and Cato from Greek texts into Latin and dedicated them to his older brother Zaccaria.

He wrote a treatise on marriage, De re uxoria, in 1415 to celebrate the marriage of Lorenzo de' Medici and Ginevra Cavalcanti. It was inspired by ancient Latin and Greek sources, and he wrote it in just 25 days. In 1513, the treatise was published in Paris by Badius Ascensius, a transcription having been made in Verona by André Tiraqueau at the house of Guarino Veronese. A French translation was made by Martin du Pin in 1537. The work was translated into Italian by Alberto Lollio in 1548. The Latin version was reprinted in Paris in 1560 and again in Amsterdam in 1639. In 1667, another French translation was made by Claude Joly under the title L'Etat du Marriage. Another Italian translation was made in 1785 as A Scelta Della Moglie.

Some of his letters and speeches were published for the first time in Brescia in 1728 under the title of Evangelistae Manelmi Vicentini Commentariorum de Obsidione Brixiae ann. 1438. Among the people he corresponded with were Alberto da Sarteano, Guarino Guarini, and Ludovico Trevisan. Many of his letters were published by Bernard Pez in Brescia in 1753. He may have been the author of a history of the Siege of Brescia.

== Sources ==
- Cantù, Cesare (1856). Scorsa di un lombardo negli archivj di Venezia. Civelli. Archived from the original on July 14, 2014.
- Frazier, Alison Knowles (2005). Possible Lives: Authors And Saints In Renaissance Italy. Columbia University Press. ISBN 978-0-231-12976-3.
- Giovanni Battista Gerini, Italian Writers of the Fifteenth Century, Paravia, 1896
- Attilio Hortis, Miscellaneous Studies of Attilio Hortis, Caprino, 1910
- King, Margaret L. (2014) [1985]. Venetian Humanism in an Age of Patrician Dominance. Princeton University Press. ISBN 9781400854349.
- Tibor Klaniczay, Reports Veneto-Hungarians at the Time of the Renaissance: Acts, Venice, Akadémiai Kiadó, 1975
- Lane, Frederic Chapin (1973). Venice, A Maritime Republic. JHU Press. ISBN 978-0-8018-1460-0.
- Michaud, Joseph Fr.; Michaud, Louis Gabriel (1811). Biographie universelle, ancienne et moderne, ou Histoire, par ordre alphabétique, de la vie publique et privée de tous les hommes qui se sont fait remarquer par leurs écrits, leurs actions, leurs talents, leurs vertus ou leurs crimes: Ouvrage entièrement neuf (in French). chez Michaud frères.
- Giuseppe Ignazio Montanari, Biography of Venetian Francesco Barbaro, 1840
- Pade, Marianne (2007). The Reception of Plutarch's Lives in Fifteenth-century Italy. Museum Tusculanum Press. ISBN 978-87-635-0532-1.
- Giovanni Ponte, The Fifteenth century, Zanichelli, 1996
- Rose, Hugh James; Rose, Henry John; Wright, Thomas (1857). A new general biographical dictionary. T. Fellowes.
- Shepherd, William (1837). The life of Poggio Bracciolini. Printed for Harris Brothers for Longman, Rees, Orme, Brown, Green & Longman, London. p. 89.
- Tomas, Natalie R. (2003). The Medici Women: Gender and Power in Renaissance Florence. Aldershot: Ashgate. ISBN 0754607771.
- Valeriano, Pierio; Haig Gaisser, Julia (1999). Pierio Valeriano Ill Fort. University of Michigan Press. ISBN 978-0-472-11055-1.
