= Ermolao Barbaro the Elder =

Italian prelate

Most Reverend Ermolao Barbaro
- Bishop of Verona
- Church: Catholic Church
- Diocese: Diocese of Verona
- In office: 1453–1471
- Predecessor: Francesco Condulmer
- Successor: Giovanni Michiel
- Previous post: Bishop of Treviso (1443–1453)

Personal details
- Born: c. 1410 Venice, Italy
- Died: 12 Mar 1471 (age 61)

Ermolao Barbaro (c. 1410 – 1471) was an Italian prelate. He is sometimes referred to as "the elder" to distinguish him from his relative Ermolao Barbaro.

== History ==
Ermolao Barbaro was born into the Venetian Barbaro family, the son of Zaccaria Barbaro and Lucrezia Lion. He was the nephew of Francesco Barbaro. As a child, he studied the Greek language with Guarino Veronese. When he was 12 years old he made a Latin translation of 33 of Aesop's Fables. Barbaro studied at the University of Padua, where he graduated in 1425. Among his teachers was Guarino Guarini.

Later he moved to Rome where he entered Papal service. In 1435, Pope Eugene IV named him apostolic prothonotary and in 1443 appointed Barbaro as Bishop of Treviso. and in 1443 appointed Barbaro as Bishop of Treviso.

In 1447, the Pope promised Barbaro the nomination as Bishop of Bergamo, but instead appointed Polidoro Foscari to the position. Barbaro left Rome and traveled Italy, but he returned to work in the curia and remained there until 1453. Nicholas V appointed him Bishop of Verona and Barbaro settled there on a permanent basis, except for a brief period in Perugia, from 1460 to 1462, as governor. In 1459, Barbaro assisted with the council held by Pius II at Mantua. In 1460, he was sent as a papal legate to Charles VII of France

Barbaro was responsible for the construction of the Bishop’s Palace at Monteforte d'Alpone between 1453–1471, designed by Michele da Caravaggio. He also translated the biography of Saint Athanasius by Eusebius of Cesarea. He died in Venice in 1471.

== Modern Italian editions of his works ==
- Ermolao Barbaro il Vecchio.Orationes contra poetas. Epistolae. Critical edition by Giorgio Ronconi. 16x24 cm, pp VIII+186. 16x24 cm, VIII +186 pp. Florence: Sansoni, 1972. Publications of the Faculty of the University of Padua
- Ermolao Barbaro il Vecchio. Aesop Fabulae. Edited by Cristina Cocco. 22 cm, pp. Genoa: D.AR.FI.CL.ET., 1994. Trad. italiana a fronte
- Hermolao Barbaro seniore interprete. Aesopi fabulae. Edited by Cristina Cocco, 25 cm, pp 155, Florence: SISMEL-Edizioni del Galluzzo, 2007. Il ritorno dei classici nell'umanesimo. National edition of the translations of Greek texts in humanistic and Renaissance age. ISBN 978-88-8450-250-6

== Sources ==
- Girolamo Tiraboschi, History of Italian Literature, Vol. VI, ed. Florence, 1819
- Vespasiano da Bisticci, Lives of Illustrious Men of the Fifteenth Century, ed. Barbera-Bianchi, Florence, 1859
- Pio Paschini, Three Eminent Prelates of the Renaissance: Ermolao Barbaro, Adriano Castellesi, Giovanni Grimani, Rome, Facultas Theologica Pontificii Athenaei Lateranensis, 1957

Catholic Church titles
Preceded by Lodovico Barbo	Bishop of Treviso; 1443–1453	Succeeded by Marino Contarini
Preceded by Francesco Condulmer	Bishop of Verona; 1453–1471	Succeeded by Giovanni Michiel
