= Flavio Biondo =

Italian humanist and historian (1392–1463)

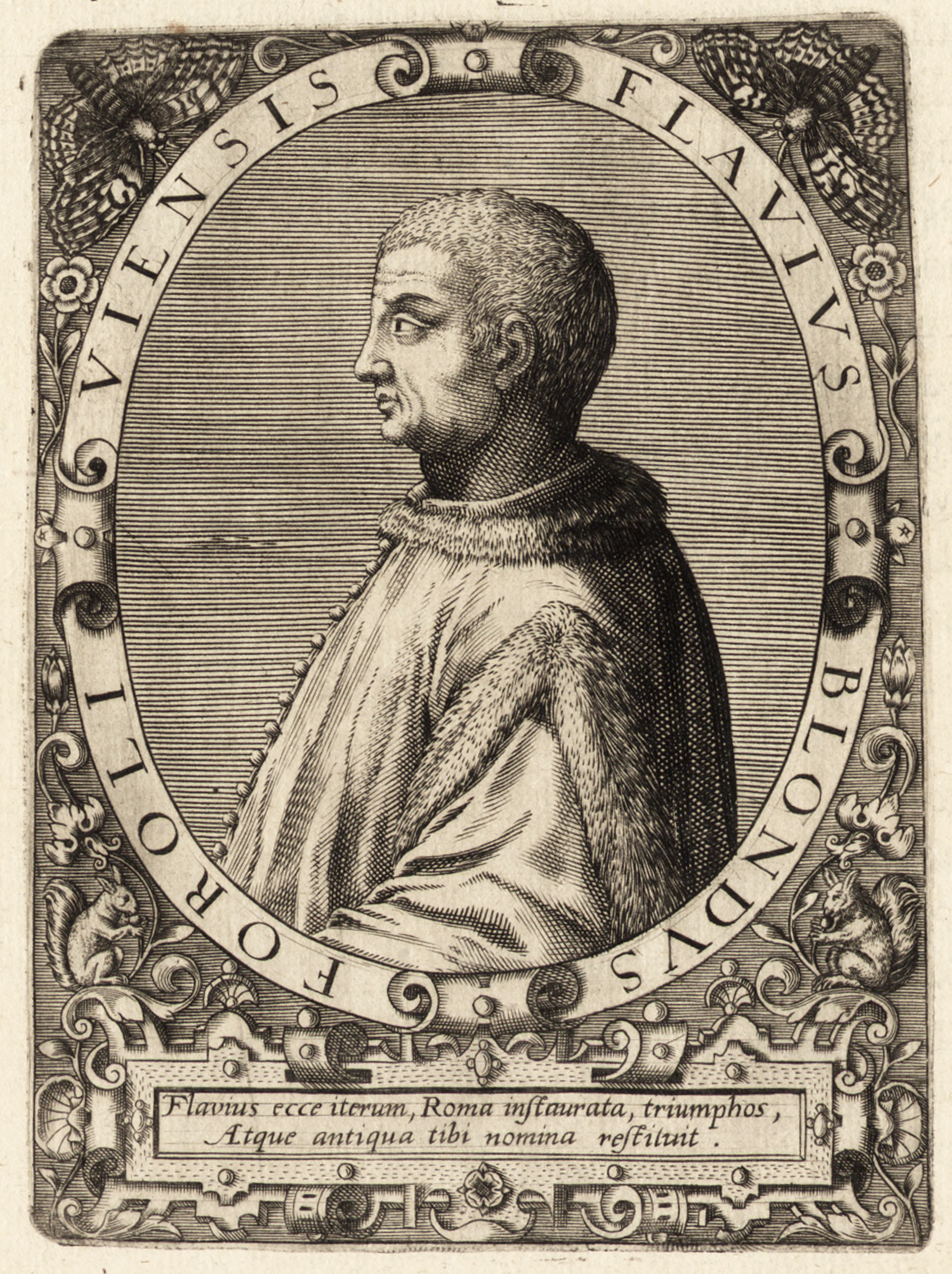
- Engraving by Theodor de Bry (1597)
- Born: 1392; Forlì, Romagna
- Died: June 4, 1463 (aged 70–71); Rome
- Scientific career
- Fields: Humanism and history
- Patrons: Ballistario of Cremona; Eugene IV; Nicholas V; Callixtus III; Pius II

Flavio Biondo (Latin Flavius Blondus) (1392 – June 4, 1463) was an Italian Renaissance humanist historian. He was one of the first historians to use a three-period division of history (Ancient, Medieval, Modern) and is known as one of the first archaeologists. Born in the capital city of Forlì, in the Romagna region, Biondo was well schooled from an early age, studying under Ballistario of Cremona. During a brief stay in Milan, he discovered and transcribed the unique manuscript of Cicero's dialogue Brutus. He moved to Rome in 1433 where he began work on his writing career; he was appointed secretary to the Cancelleria under Pope Eugene IV in 1444 and accompanied Eugene in his exile in Ferrara and Florence. After his patron's death, Biondo was employed by his papal successors, Nicholas V, Callixtus III and the humanist Pius II.

== Archaeological works ==
Biondo published three encyclopedic works that were systematic and documented guides to the ruins and topography of ancient Rome, for which he has been called one of the first archaeologists; subsequent antiquaries and historians built on the foundations laid down by Biondo and by his older contemporary, Poggio Bracciolini. At the time the ruins of ancient Rome were overgrown and unexplored. When in 1420 Bracciolini climbed the Capitol he saw only deserted fields. The Forum, buried in eroded topsoil, was grazed by cows—the Campo Vaccino—and pigs rooted in its unweeded vegetation. Biondo and fellow humanists like Leon Battista Alberti began to explore and document the architecture, topography and history of Rome, and in the process revived a vision of Rome's former glory.

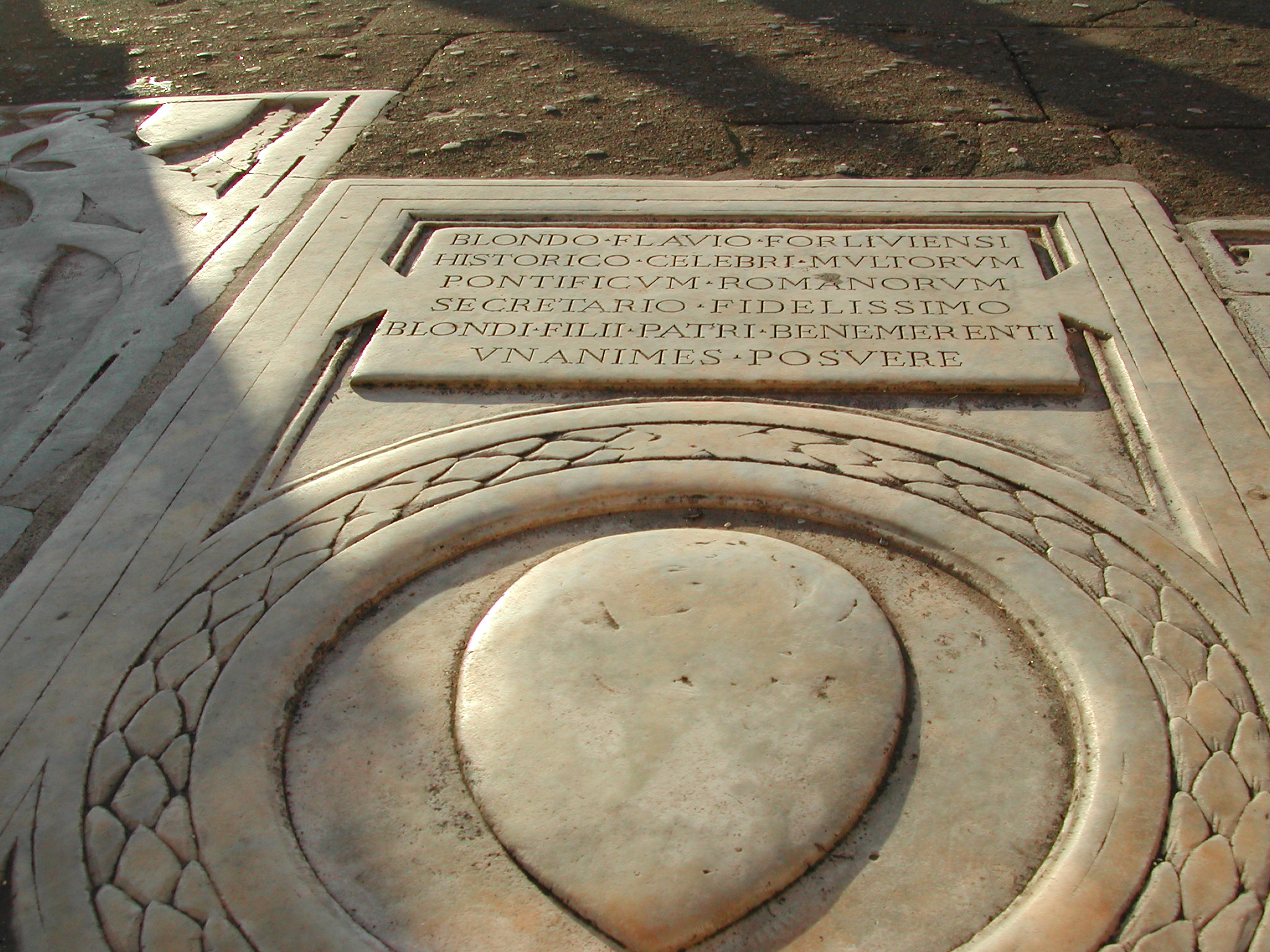
Flavio Biondo's gravestone in Santa Maria in Aracoeli, Rome

Biondo's first work was De Roma instaurata (Rome Restored, 3 vols., 1444–1448), a reconstruction of ancient Roman topography. It was and remains a highly influential humanist vision of restoring Rome to its previous heights of grandeur by recreating what Rome used to look like based on the ruins which remained. This work was the first systematic and well documented guide to the ruins of Rome, or indeed any ancient ruins.

The second was the highly popular De Roma triumphante (Rome Triumphant, 1479) about pagan Rome as a model for contemporary governmental and military reforms. The book was highly influential in reviving Roman patriotism and respect for ancient Rome, while presenting the papacy as a continuation of the Roman Empire.

== Historical works ==
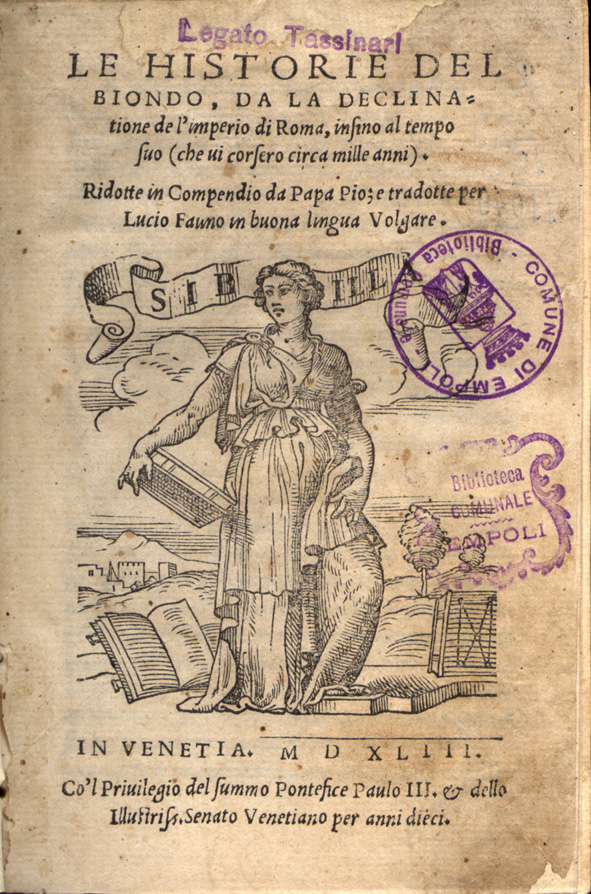
Historiarum ab inclinatione Romanorum imperii decades, Italian translation by Lucio Fauno, 1543

Biondo's greatest works were Italia illustrata (Italy Illuminated, written between 1448 and 1458, published 1474) and the Historiarum ab inclinatione Romanorum imperii decades (Decades of History from the Deterioration of the Roman Empire, written from 1439 to 1453, published in 1483).

The Italia illustrata (1474) is a geography, based on the author's personal travels, and history of fourteen Italian regions (regiones). Unlike medieval geographers, whose focus was regional, Biondo, taking Strabo for his model, reinstated the idea of Italy to include the whole of the peninsula. Through topography, he intended to link Antiquity with modern times, with descriptions of each location, the etymology of its toponym and its changes through time, with a synopsis of important events connected with each location. This first historical geography starts with the Roman Republic and Empire, through 400 years of barbarian invasions and an analysis of Charlemagne and later Holy Roman Emperors. He gives an excellent description of the humanist revival and restoration of the classics during the first half of the fifteenth century.

Biondo's greatest work is the Historiarum ab Inclinatione Romanorum Imperii (Venice, 1483), a history of Europe in thirty-two books, from the plunder of Rome in 410 by the Visigoths to contemporary Italy (1442). Using only the most reliable and primary sources, it used a three-period framework, with Italy reviving in Biondo's own time and breaking free of earlier trends. Leonardo Bruni also used a three-period framework in History of the Florentine People, written at about the same time as Biondo's work.

== Sources ==
- Repertorium Blondianum
- Rome in Triumph, edited by Maria Agata Pincelli, translation and notes by Frances Muecke, Harvard University Press, 2016.
- "Flavio Biondo". In Encyclopædia Britannica Online.
- "Flavio Biondo" in Catholic Encyclopedia (1907).
- Castner, Catherine J. (ed., trans., comm.). Biondo Flavio's Italia illustrata: Text, translation, and commentary. Vol. I: Northern Italy. (Binghamton, NY: Global Academic Publishing, 2005).
- J. A. White (ed., trans.), Biondo Flavio, Italy Illuminated. Vol. 1: Books I-IV, I Tatti Renaissance Library 20 (Cambridge, MA: Harvard University Press, 2005) and Italy Illuminated. Vol. 2: Books V-VIII, I Tatti Renaissance Library 75 (Cambridge, MA: Harvard University Press, 2016)
- F. Della Schiava (ed.), Blondus Flavius, "Roma instaurata". Vol. 1, Edizione Nazionale delle Opere di Biondo Flavio, 7 (Roma: Istituto Storico Italiano per il Medioevo, 2020)
- James Hankins, Virtue Politics: Soulcraft and Statecraft in Renaissance Italy, Harvard University Press, 2019.
