= Marcus Antonius Coccius Sabellicus =

Venetian scholar and historian (1436–1506)

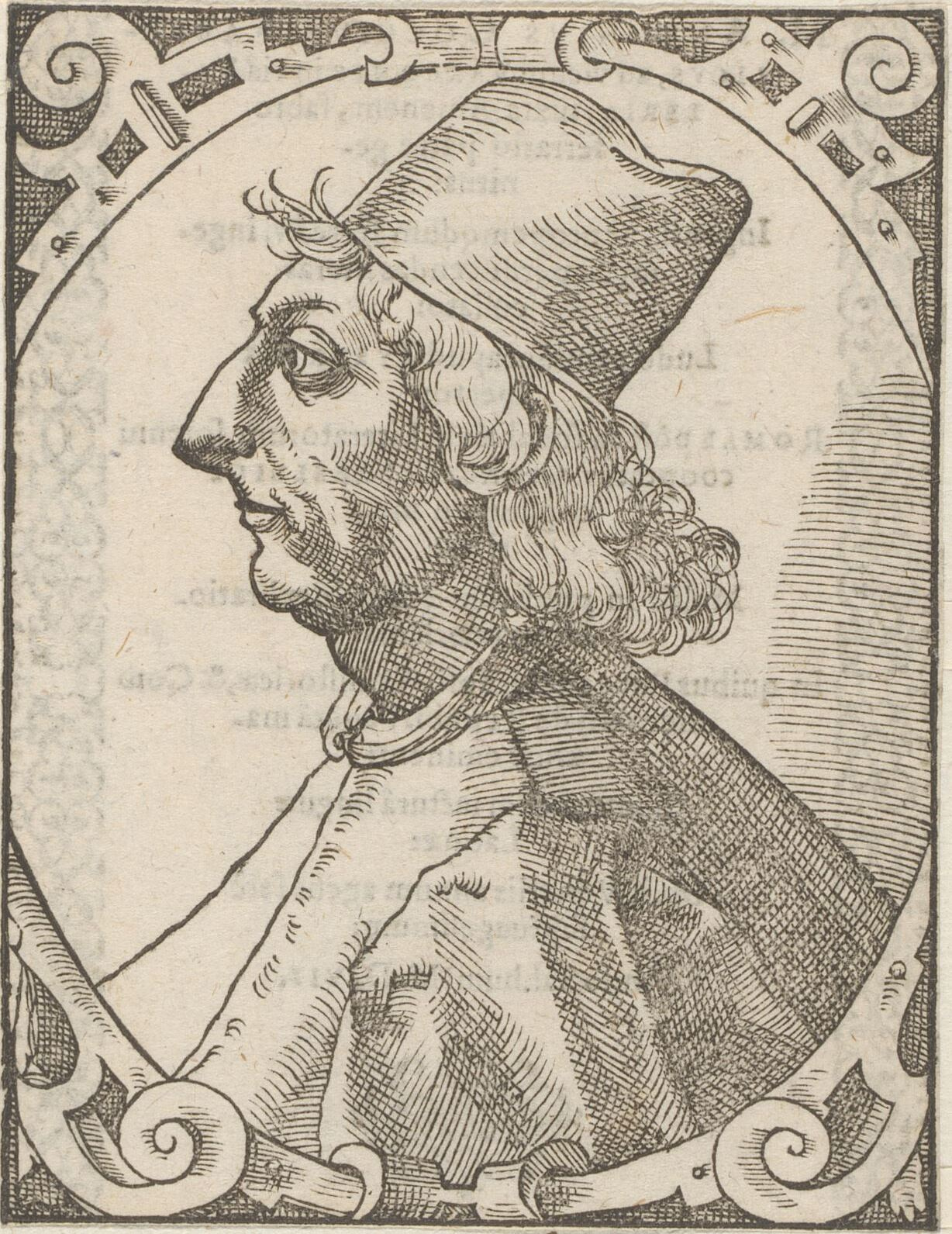
- Portrait of Marcus Antonius Coccius Sabellicus by Tobias Stimmer
- Born: Marcantonio Coccio; 1436; Vicovaro, Papal States
- Died: 19 April 1506 (aged 69–70); Venice, Republic of Venice
- Occupation: Renaissance humanist

Marcus Antonius Coccius Sabellicus or Marcantonio Sabellico (1436 – 19 April 1506) was a scholar and historian from Venice. He is known for his universal history, Enneades sive Rhapsodia historiarum.

== Life ==
Born in Vicovaro, his surname was originally Cocci; he took his Latinised name as a pupil of Pomponius Laetus. He studied also with Porcelio Pandone (1405–1485) and Gaspare da Verona.

Sabellicus became professor of eloquence at Udine in 1473, but was dismissed in 1482. After a short period at Verona, he went to Venice, with the Venetian history he had written speculatively. He was given a teaching position as deputy to Giorgio Valla. In 1487 he was appointed as a curator of the Biblioteca Marciana.

== Works ==
Sabellicus while at Udine wrote an antiquarian work on Aquileia that appeared in 1482. He then produced a Latin history of Venice, Historiae rerum venetarum ab urbe condita, with official encouragement; but it proved unpopular with the citizens. He wrote further works concerned with Venice, including a street-level description De Venetae urbis situ ('On the site of Venice' 1492). As a humanist scholar, he wrote commentaries on classical authors. The Enneades sive Rhapsodia historiarum appeared in 1498. His collected works were published in 1560 at Basel.

The Historiae rerum venetarum had a first continuator, Andrea Navagero, who died having asked for his work to be destroyed. A second continuator, Pietro Bembo, was appointed in 1530, and he brought it up to 1513.

An early poem in hexameters, De rerum et artium inventoribus, was an influence on Polydore Vergil, whom Sabellicus had helped with Guidobaldo of Urbino. It derives from the Historia Naturalis of Pliny the Elder, book VII, on the history of inventions. It was also quoted verbatim by Otto Heurnius, writing in 1600 a pioneering history of "barbarian philosophy". He also wrote "De Venetis magistratibus", Venice: Antonius de Strata, 1488, on the duties of various Venetian magistrates; it has a dedication letter of the author to the doge Augustinus Barbadicus and letter to the reader of Petrus Benedictus Venetus
