= Lauro Quirini =

Cretan-born Venetian patrician and humanist scholar

Lauro Quirini (c. 1420–1474/1481) was a Cretan-born Venetian patrician and humanist scholar. He studied arts and law at the University of Padua, and was skilled in both Latin and Ancient Greek. He returned to Crete in 1452, where his father and Lauro himself held a concession for the mining and export of alum. He remained in Crete for the remainder of his life, which precluded his active participation in Venetian politics, unlike most of his contemporary humanist colleagues. He is notable for the series of letters exhorting the Pope and Venice to take action against the advancing Ottoman Empire, especially after the Fall of Constantinople in 1453.

Quirini received his doctorate in arts at Padua in 1440 and a doctorate in canon law in 1448. In 1451, he married his first wife, Pelegrina di Marin Falier. He later married Pentasilea Muazzo.
