= Margaret L. King =

American historian of the Italian Renaissance

Margaret L. King (born 1947) is an American historian of the Italian Renaissance and a professor emerita of history at the CUNY Graduate Center in New York. In 2025, she was elected to the American Philosophical Society.

== Education and career ==
King is a 1967 graduate of Sarah Lawrence College, where she majored in history. She went to Stanford University for graduate study in history, earning a master's degree in 1968 and completing her Ph.D. in 1972.

She became an assistant professor at California State University, Fullerton in 1969, and moved to Brooklyn College in 1972. She was promoted to associate professor in 1976 and full professor in 1987, at the same time adding an affiliation with the CUNY Graduate Center. From 2006 to 2010 she was Broeklundian Professor at Brooklyn College.

She retired as professor emerita in 2012.

== Recognition ==
King received the 1986 Howard R. Marraro Prize of the American Catholic Historical Association for the best book in Italian history for her first book, Venetian Humanism in an Age of Patrician Dominance. She received a different but similarly named prize in 1996, the Helen & Howard R. Marraro Prize of the American Historical Association, for The Death of the Child Valerio Marcello.

In 2016 the Society for the Study of Early Modern Women gave King their lifetime achievement award in recognition of her editorship of the series The Other Voice in Early Modern Europe. She was the 2018 recipient of the Paul Oskar Kristeller Lifetime Achievement Award of the Renaissance Society of America.

== Books ==
King is the author of books including:

- Venetian Humanism in an Age of Patrician Dominance, Princeton University Press, 1986
- Women of the Renaissance, University of Chicago Press, 1991
- The Death of the Child Valerio Marcello, University of Chicago Press, 1994
- Western Civilization: A Social and Cultural History, Prentice-Hall, 2000; 3rd ed., 2004
- The Renaissance in Europe (Laurence King, 2004); 3rd ed., A Short History of the Renaissance in Europe, University of Toronto Press, 2016
- Humanism, Venice, and Women: Essays on the Italian Renaissance, Ashgate, 2005
- How Mothers Shaped Successful Sons and Created World History: The School of Infancy, Mellen Press, 2014

Books she has edited or translated include:

- Her Immaculate Hand: Selected Works By and About the Women Humanists of Quattrocento Italy, with Albert Rabil Jr., Medieval & Renaissance Texts & Studies, 1983; 2nd ed., 1992
- Isotta Nogarola, Complete Writings: Letterbook, Dialogue on Adam and Eve, Orations, with Diana Robin, University of Chicago Press, 2004
- Teaching Other Voices: Women and Religion in Early Modern Europe, with Albert Rabil Jr., University of Chicago Press, 2007
- Renaissance Humanism: An Anthology of Sources, Hackett Publishing, 2014
- Francesco Barbaro, The Wealth of Wives: A Fifteenth-Century Marriage Manual, Iter Press, 2015
- Reformation Thought: An Anthology of Sources, Hackett Publishing, 2016
- Enlightenment Thought: An Anthology of Sources, Hackett Publishing, 2019
- The Western Literary Tradition: An Introduction in Texts, Volume 1: The Hebrew Bible to John Milton, Hackett Publishing, 2020
- The Western Literary Tradition: An Introduction in Texts, Volume 2: From Jonathan Swift to George Orwell, Hackett Publishing, 2022
