= House of Loredan-Santa Maria =

Venetian Noble Lineage

- Noble House
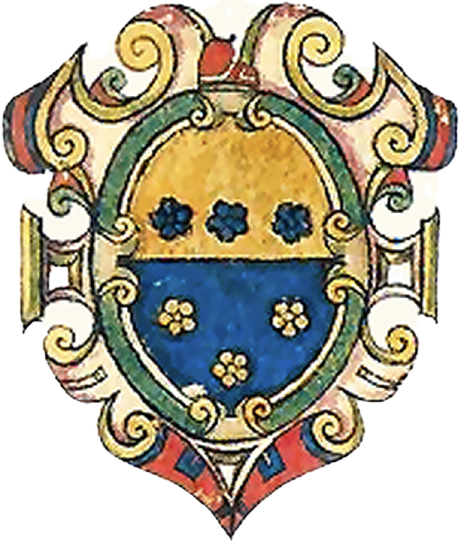
- Coat of Arms of the House of Loredan
- Parent family: House of Loredan
- Country: Former; Republic of Venice; Modern; Albania; Croatia; Cyprus; Greece; Italy; Montenegro; Slovenia
- Current region: Croatia; United Kingdom
- Etymology: by the churches of Santa Maria Formosa and Santa Maria dei Miracoli
- Origin: Venice
- Founded: 14th century
- Founder: Pietro Loredan
- Titles: Procurator of Saint Mark; Regent of the Archipelago; Duchess of the Archipelago; Duke of Albania; Duke of Morea; Duke of Dalmatia; Duke of Friuli; Count of Brescia; Count of Crema; Count of Famagusta; Count of Feltre; Count of Kotor; Count of Palmanova; Count of Peschiera; Count of Pula; Count of Rovigo; Count of Salò; Count of Scutari; Count of Spalato; Count of Treviso; Count of Zara; Lord of Antiparos; Lady of Ios; Lady of Naxos; Lady of Paros; Lady of Therasia
- Members: Antonio Loredan; Giacomo Loredan; Giovanni Loredan; Giovanni Francesco Loredan; Marco Loredan; Marco Loredan; Pietro Loredan; Taddea Caterina Loredan
- Connected members: Francesco Barbaro; Francesco III Crispo; John IV Crispo; Giacomo IV Crispo
- Connected families: Barbarigo; Barbaro; Barozzi; Contarini; Cornaro; Dandolo; Dolfin; Donà; Foscari; Giustiniani; Mocenigo; Mòro; Morosini; Pisani; Priuli; Vendramin; Venier; Zorzi
- Distinctions: Order of Saint Mark
- Traditions: Roman Catholicism
- Motto: NON NOBIS DOMINE (Praise us not, O Lord.)

The House of Loredan-Santa Maria is a cadet branch of the noble House of Loredan which has produced many politicians, diplomats, military generals, naval captains, church dignitaries, writers and lawyers, and has played a significant role in the creation of modern opera with the Accademia degli Incogniti, also called the Loredanian Academy. The branch draws its name from the parishes of Santa Maria Formosa and Santa Maria dei Miracoli in Venice, around which it was historically settled. The progenitor of the branch is considered to be the famous admiral and procurator Pietro Loredan (1372-1438) by his sons Giacomo and Polo.

== History ==
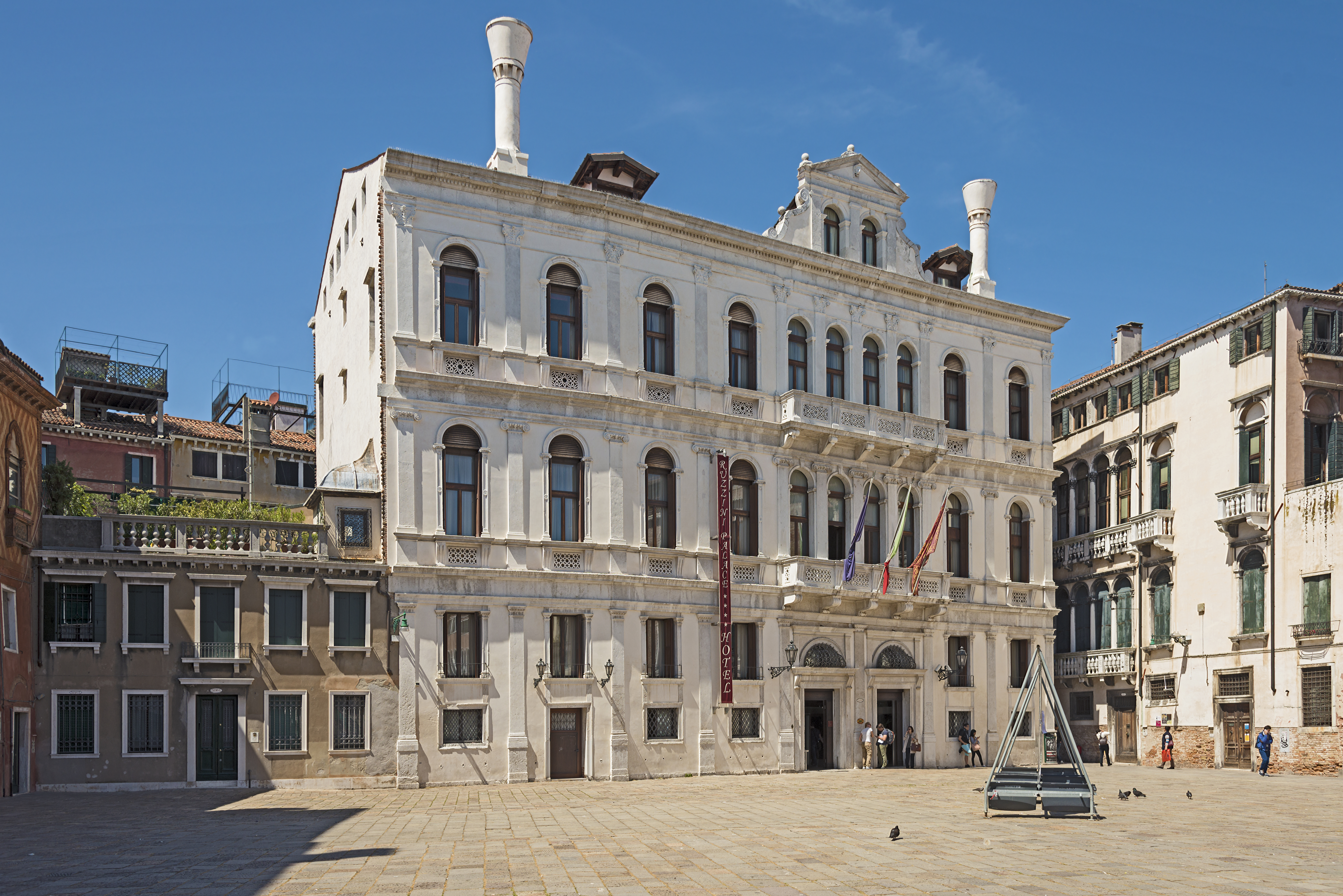
Palazzo Loredan a Santa Maria

The branch of Santa Maria originated from the sons of the admiral Pietro Loredan (1372-1438), Giacomo (1396-1471) and Polo, in the late 14th century. From the two brothers it was divided into two separate lineages named after two nearby parishes around which its members were settled - Santa Maria Formosa (by the homonymous church in Castello) and Santa Maria Nova (by the Church of Santa Maria dei Miracoli in Cannaregio). Besides Venice, in the following centuries the branch also settled in the Aegean islands and on the Dalmatian coast.

Giacomo Loredan (1396-1471) was a military general who served as Captain of the Gulf and three times as Captain General of the Sea in the Venetian Navy. He defeated the Ottomans in battle in 1464. For his many merits towards his homeland, his portrait was placed in the hall of the Great Council in the Doge's Palace, where it remained until the fire of 1577. According to Girolamo Priuli he was "handsome in body and very vigorous, prudent, just and liberal".

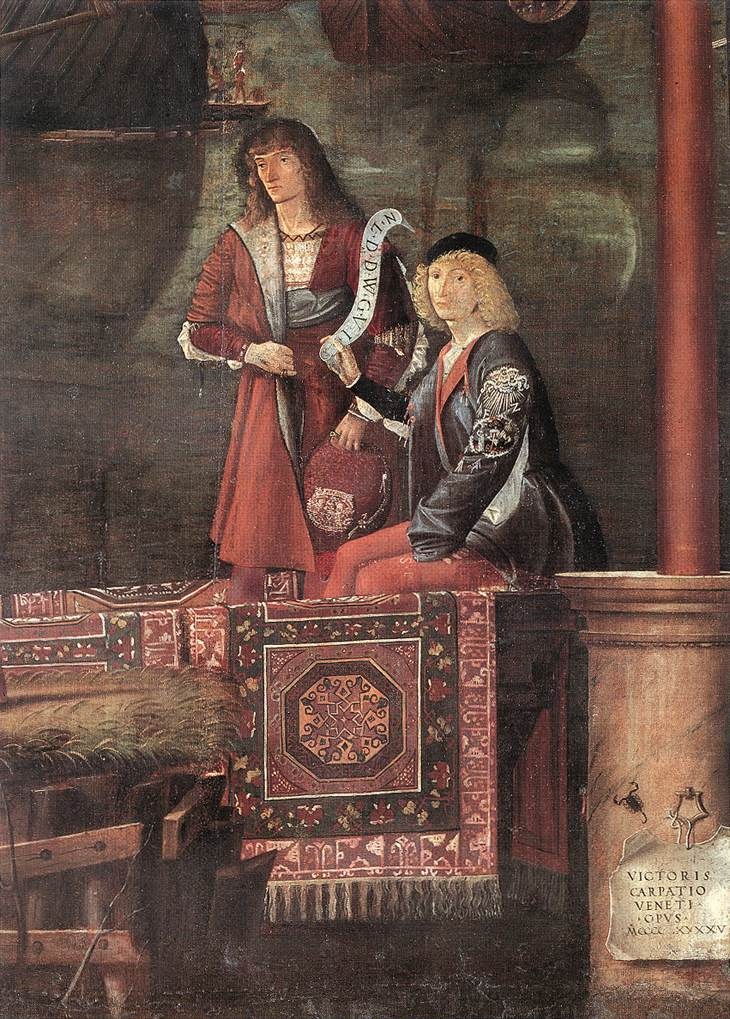
Antonio Loredan (on the right) and a Young Man, by Vittore Carpaccio, 1495, Gallerie dell'Accademia

Antonio Loredan (1420-1482) was captain of Venetian-held Scutari and governor in Split (Venetian Dalmatia), Venetian Albania and the Morea. He is famous for the successful defence of Scutari from Sultan Mehmed II's Ottoman forces led by Hadım Suleiman Pasha. According to some sources, when the Scutari garrison complained for lack of food and water, Loredan told them: "If you are hungry, here is my flesh; if you are thirsty, I give you my blood." He also served as the Captain General of the Sea and is notable for commissioning the Legend of Saint Ursula (1497/98), a series of large wall-paintings by Vittore Carpaccio originally created for Scuola di Sant'Orsola which was under the patronage of the Loredan family.

The family is also significant for the island of Antiparos in the Aegean Sea. Apparently the Venetians did not pay much attention to the island which by the beginning of the 15th century was a pirate base and haven. This changed when the lord of the island became Giovanni Loredan, who had married Maria Sommaripa (d. 1446) from the family of the rulers of Paros, with whom he had a daughter Lucrezia Loredan (1446-1528), Lady of Antiparos. Loredan brought new inhabitants to the island at his own expense and built the castle in 1440 which had a very specific and unique style of architecture. The castle and the island remained in the ownership of the House of Loredan until 1480 when they were given as a dowry to Domenico Pisani, son of the Duke of Crete who had married Fiorenza, the daughter of the Duke of Naxos.

Taddea Caterina Loredan, Duchess of the Archipelago, known as "a lady of wisdom and great talent", was the wife of Francesco III Crispo, who was mentally ill and was known as the "Mad Duke". Francesco attacked her in August of 1510; Taddea tried to escape from him, and she fled to the castle of her cousin Lucrezia Loredan, Lady of Ios and Therasia, where Francesco had followed her a day later and attacked her again, on the 17th of August 1510, now murdering her. Their son John IV Crispo became the next Duke of the Archipelago in 1517, after a regency period during which he was still too young to rule. A 1908 book by historian William Miller titled "The Latins in the Levant, a History of Frankish Greece" indicates that the regent of the Duchy from 1511 to 1517 was Taddea's brother Antonio Loredan.

Marco Loredan (1489-1557) was a senator and politician, as well as Count of Brescia, Feltre, Rovigo, Salò and Famagusta, presiding over a time of famine and poverty following the War of the League of Cambrai.

Marco Loredan (d. 1577) was a priest and senator who was appointed by Pope Julius II as the Bishop of Nona (today Nin, Croatia), a position which he held from 1554 to 1577. He was also appointed by Pope Gregory XIII as the Apostolic Administrator and Archbishop of Zara (today Zadar, Croatia), where he stayed from 1573 until his death on the 25th of June, 1577.

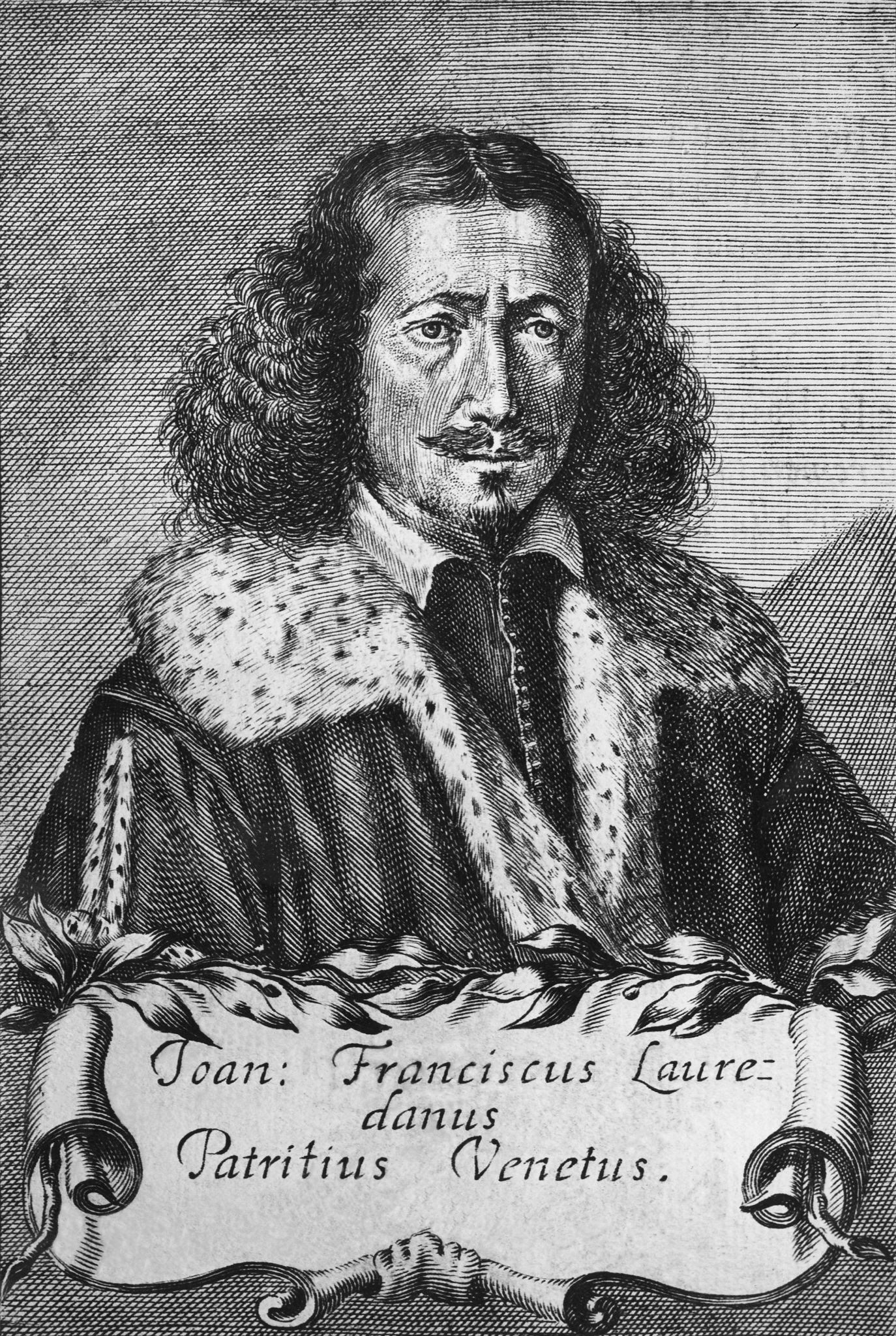
Portrait of Giovanni Francesco Loredan, by Giacomo Piccini

Giovanni Francesco Loredan, born in 1607, was a writer and politician. He was born in Venice as the son of Lorenzo Loredan and Leonora Boldù. When both of his parents died while he was very young, he was raised by his uncle Antonio Boldù and had as his teacher Antonio Colluraffi. He divided his youth between hard study and an extravagant lifestyle. He attended the classes of renowned Aristotelian philosopher Cesare Cremoni in Padua and began, before 1623, to gather around him the group of scholars who then formed the Accademia degli Incogniti, also called the Loredanian academy. As founder of the Accademia degli Incogniti and a member of many other Academies, he had close contact with almost all the scholars of his time. He and his circle played a decisive role in the creation of modern opera. In addition to literary activity, he also took part in public affairs. At twenty he was recorded in the Golden Book, but his career began quite late: in September 1632 he was elected Savio agli Ordini and in 1635 he was treasurer of the fortress of Palmanova. On his return in 1636 he reorganized the Accademia degli Incogniti and, in 1638, despite attempts to avoid it, he was obliged, as the only descendant of his branch, to contract marriage with Laura Valier. He was then Provveditore ai Banchi (1640), Provveditore alle Pompe (1642), and in 1648 he made the leap to the rank of Avogador del Comùn that he held several times (1651, 1656 and 1657). He subsequently joined the office of the State Inquisitors and became a member of the Council of Ten. In 1656 he entered the Minor Consiglio, that is, among the six patricians who, together with the doge, composed the Serenissima Signoria. However, he may then have been pushed out of office, as in the following years he no longer held important positions. In 1660 he was a Provveditore in Peschiera. The following year, on the 13th of August 1661, he died.

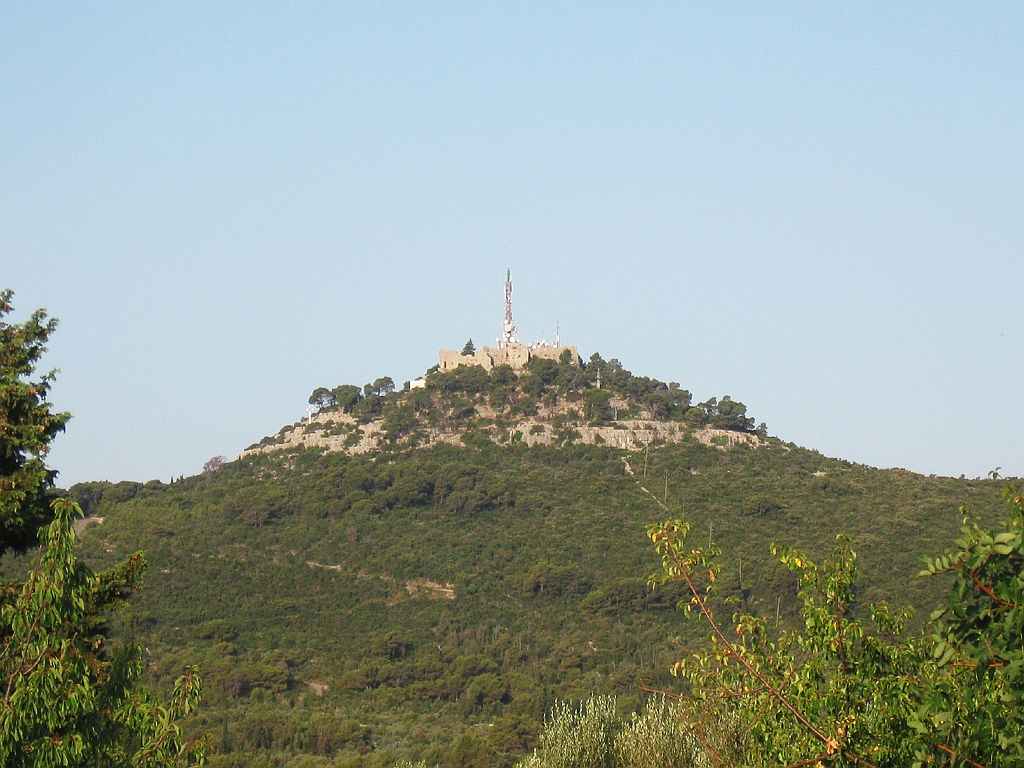

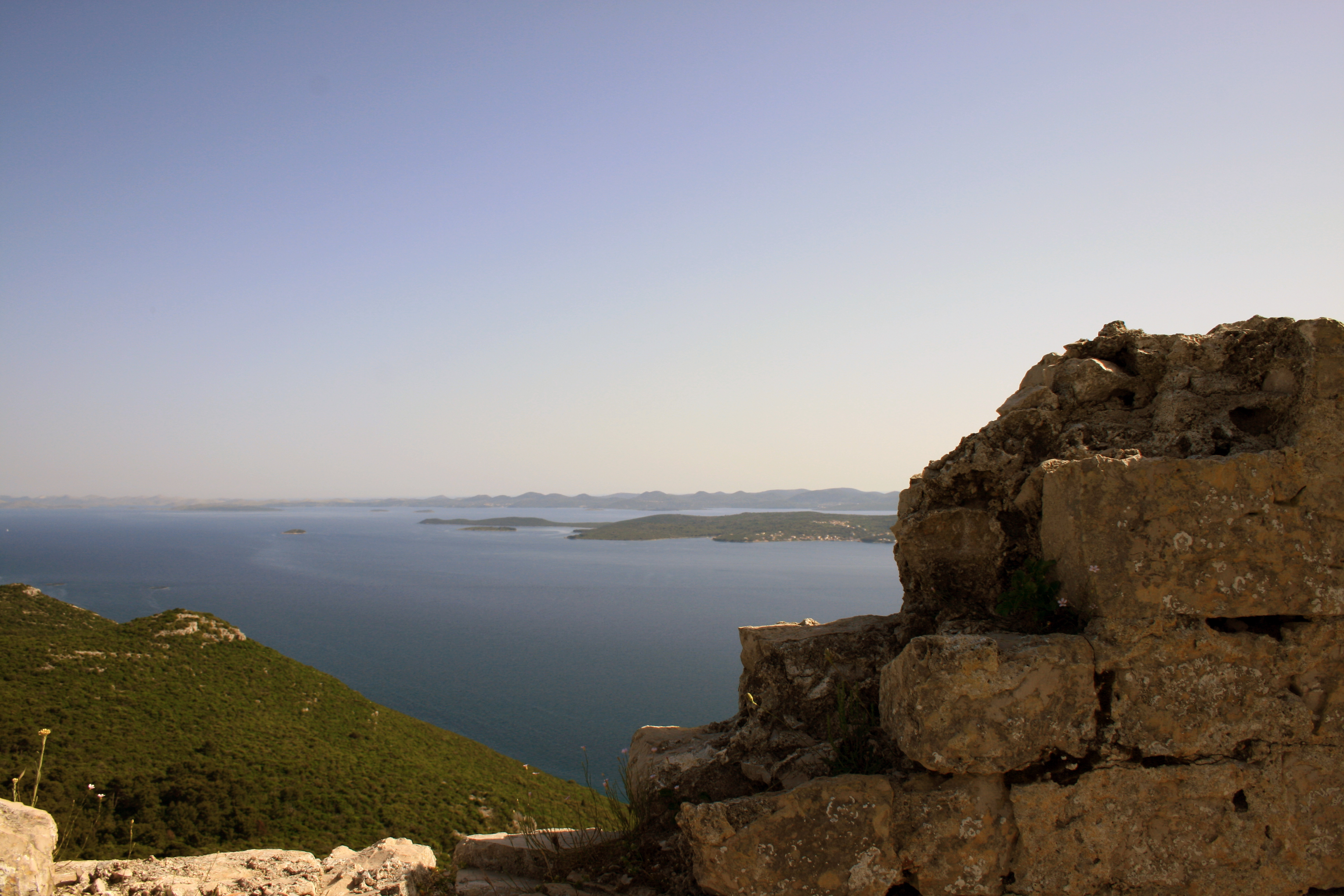
St. Michael's Fort in Ugljan, built by Venetians in 1202.

Although most Venetian nobles usually came to Dalmatian cities on political or military duty, and stayed until the end of their term, branches of some Venetian noble families, such as the Loredans, the Venier, and the da Mosto families, settled in and around Zara. A part of the Santa Maria branch of the Loredan family has been settled on the Dalmatian island of Ugljan (today part of Croatia) since the 18th century. Descendants today still live on the island, as well as in London.

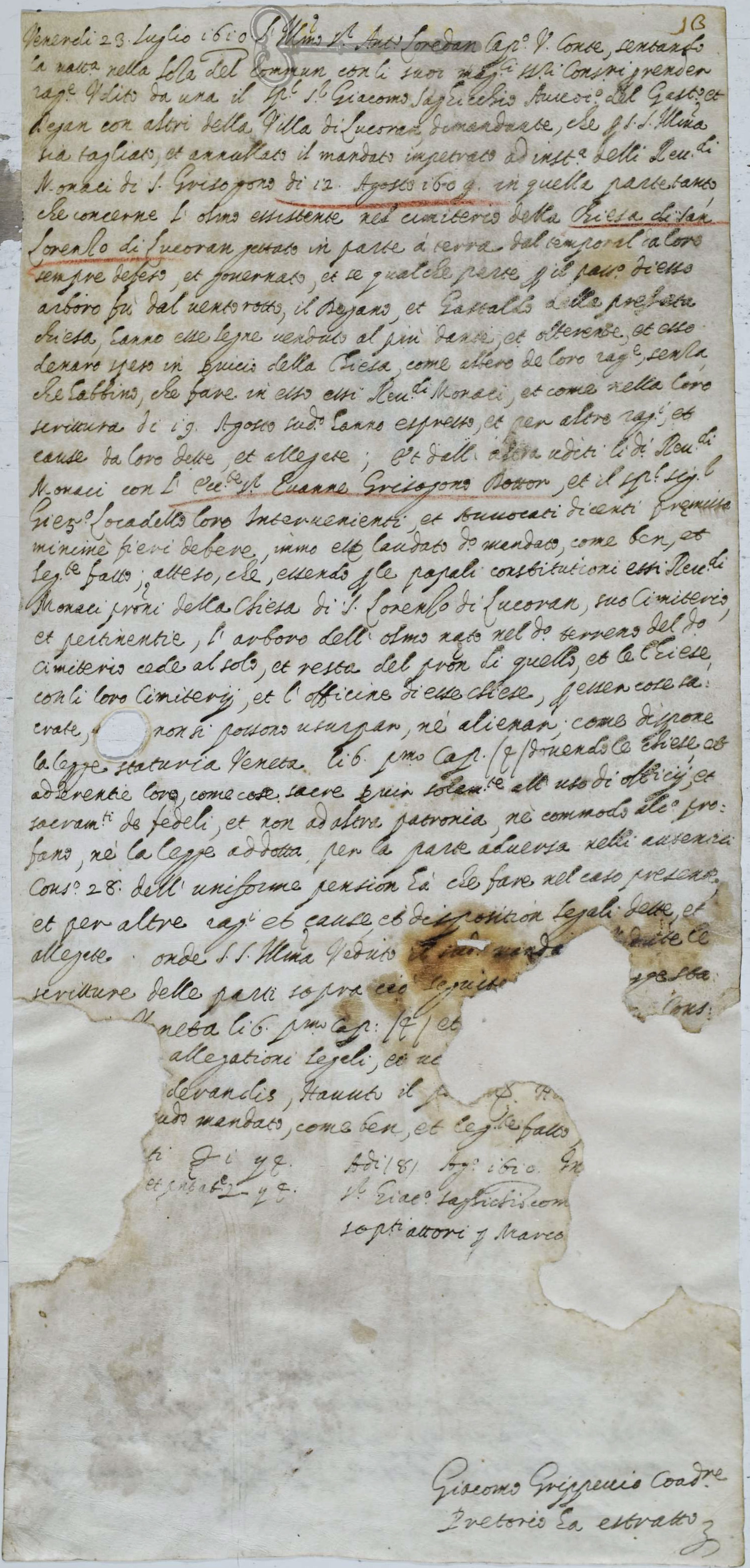
A document describing Antonio Loredan, Count and Captain of Zara, judging over a dispute over the cutting of a tree in the cemetery next to the church of St. Lawrence in Lukoran, Ugljan, on the 23rd of July, 1610.

== Titles ==
Title	Type	Modern country
Procurator of St. Mark	noble and political	Italy
Regent of the Archipelago	noble	Greece
Duchess of the Archipelago	noble	Greece
Duke of the Kingdom of the Morea	noble and political	Greece
Duke of Dalmatia	noble and political	Croatia
Duke of Albania	noble and political	Albania
Duke of Friuli	noble and political	Italy
Count of Treviso	noble and political	Italy
Count of Rovigo	noble and political	Italy
Count of Palmanova	noble and political	Italy
Count of Brescia	noble and political	Italy
Count of Peschiera del Garda	noble and political	Italy
Count of Crema	noble and political	Italy
Count of Feltre	noble and political	Italy
Count of Salò	noble and political	Italy
Count of Zara	noble and political	Croatia
Count of Spalato	noble and political	Croatia
Count of Pula	noble and political	Croatia
Count of Kotor	noble and political	Montenegro
Count of Scutari	noble and political	Albania
Count of Famagusta	noble and political	Cyprus
Lord of Antiparos	noble	Greece
Lady of Ios	noble	Greece
Lady of Therasia	noble	Greece
Lady of Naxos	noble	Greece
Lady of Paros	noble	Greece
Lady of Antiparos	noble	Greece
Bailo of Corfu	diplomatic	Greece
Bailo of Negroponte	diplomatic	Greece
Captain General of the Sea	naval	Greece
Captain of the Gulf	naval	Montenegro
Savio del Consiglio	political	Italy
Avogador de Comùn	legal	Italy
Archbishop of Zara	ecclesiastical	Croatia
Bishop of Nona	ecclesiastical	Croatia

== Genealogy ==
Note: Genealogical trees are partial and do not feature recent members.

Santa Maria Formosa

House of Loredan-Santa Maria Formosa

Alvise Loredan	Giovanna (d. after 1404)
Pietro Loredan (1372-1438)	Campagnola Lando	Giorgio Loredan	Giovanni Loredan (d. 1420)
Polo Loredan	Giacomo Loredan (1396-1471)	Beatrice Marcello	Maria Loredan	Francesco Barbaro (1390-1454)
Antonio Loredan (1420-1482)	Orsola Pisani	Luca Loredan
San Cancian
Giovanni Loredan	Marco Loredan	Jacopo Loredan
Santa Maria Nova
Gianfrancesco Loredan
Lorenzo Loredan (d. 1608)	Leonora Boldù (d. 1609)	Maria Loredan
Giovanni Francesco Loredan (1607-1661)	Laura Valier
Antonio Loredan (b. 1641)	Antonio Alberto Loredan (b. 1644)	Ottavio Loredan (b. 1648)	Lorenzo Loredan (b. 1649)	Elena Loredan
Lorenzo Loredan "Lolo"

Note: Giacomo Loredan (1396-1471) and Beatrice Marcello had several children, although only Antonio Loredan and Luca Loredan are featured in this genealogical tree.

Note: Antonio Loredan (1420-1482) and Orsola Pisani had many children, although only three sons (Giovanni, Marco, Jacopo) are featured in this genealogical tree.

Santa Maria Nova

House of Loredan-Santa Maria Nova

Alvise Loredan	Giovanna (d. after 1404)
Pietro Loredan (1372-1438)	Campagnola Lando	Giorgio Loredan	Giovanni Loredan (d. 1420)
Beatrice Marcello	Giacomo Loredan (1396-1471)	Polo Loredan	Maria Loredan	Francesco Barbaro (1390-1454)
San Cancian
Alvise Loredan (d. 1502)	Argentina Vincenzina Contarini
Santa Maria Formosa
Alessandro Loredan	Lorenzo Loredan	Marco Loredan (1489-1557)	Elisabetta Contarini
Alvise Loredan (1533-1560)	Nicolò Loredan (1534-1560)	Giovanni Loredan (1537-1571)	Polo Loredan (1540-1593)	Pietro Loredan (1541-1565)

Note: Alvise Loredan (d. 1502) and Argentina Vincenzina Contarini had 10 children - 4 sons and 6 daughters, although only Alessandro, Lorenzo and Marco Loredan (1489-1557) are featured in the genealogical tree.

Note: Besides the five sons listed, Marco Loredan (1489-1557) and Elisabetta Contarini also had daughters.

Alvise Loredan (d. 1502) was a military general.

Alvise Loredan (1533-1560) was assassinated in 1560.

Giovanni Loredan (1537-1571) was killed in the Echinades, Ionian Sea, as a commander of a galley in the Battle of Lepanto.

Polo Loredan (1540-1493) was the one to continue the lineage.

Ducal line in Greece

House of Loredan-Greece

Giovanni Loredan	Maria Sommaripa
Francesco Crispo	Lucrezia Loredan (1446-1528)	Paolo Paterno	Francesco III Crispo (1483-1511)	Taddea Caterina Loredan (d. 1510)	Antonio Loredan
Caterina Crispo	John IV Crispo (1499-1564)	Adriana Gozzadini
Caterina Crispo (b. 1516)	Francesco IV Crispo (1518-1550)	Taddea Crispo (b. 1519)	Giacomo IV Crispo (1520-1576)

== Gallery ==
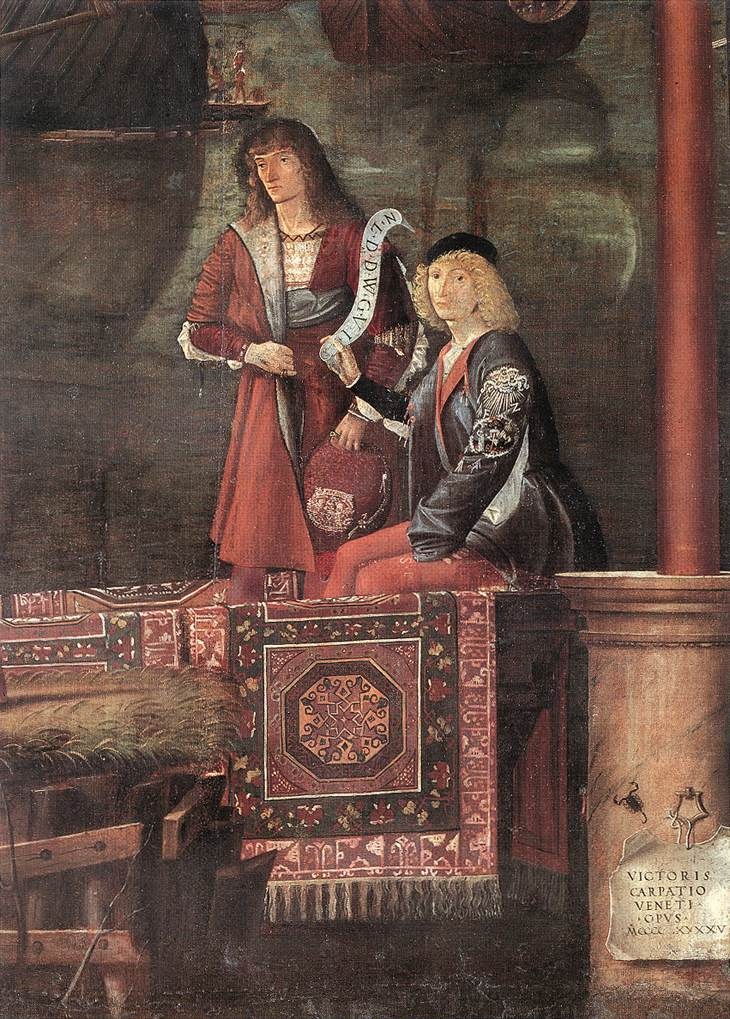
Antonio Loredan (on the right) and a Young Man, by Vittore Carpaccio, 1495, Gallerie dell'Accademia, Venice

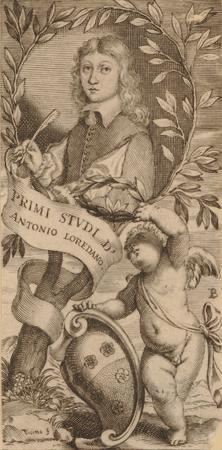
Print of Antonio Loredan, by Giacomo Piccini, 1662, British Museum, London

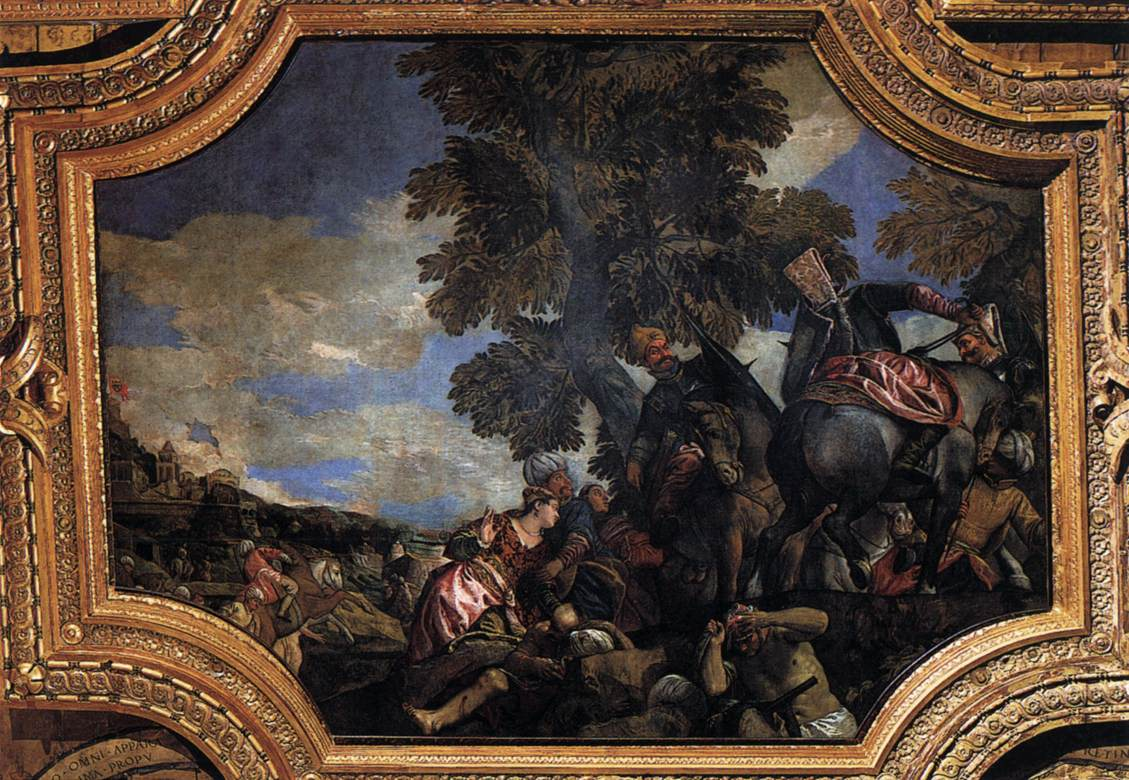
Siege of Scutari, by Paolo Veronese, 1585, featuring Antonio Loredan, Doge's Palace, Venice

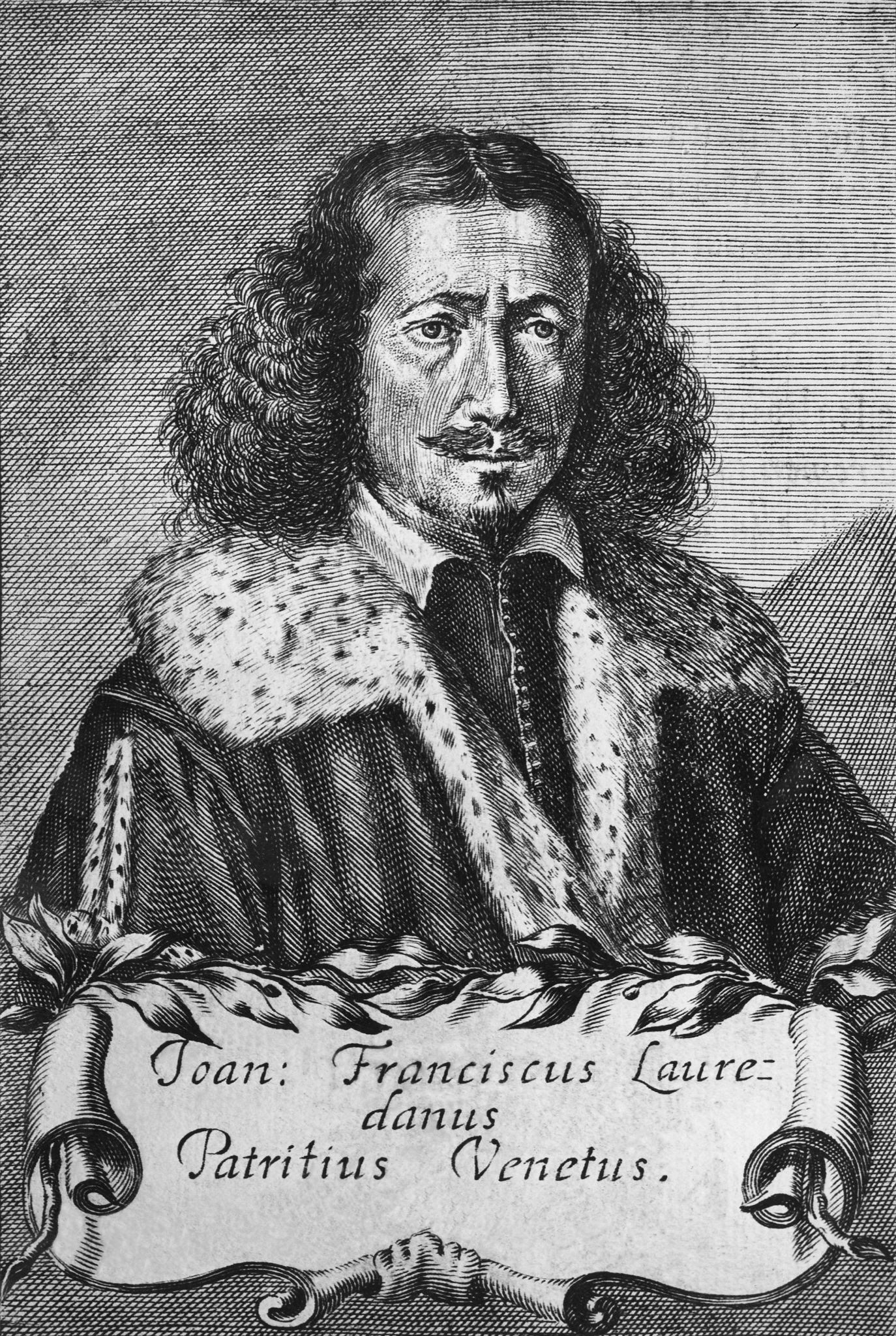
Portrait of Giovanni Francesco Loredan, by Giacomo Piccini

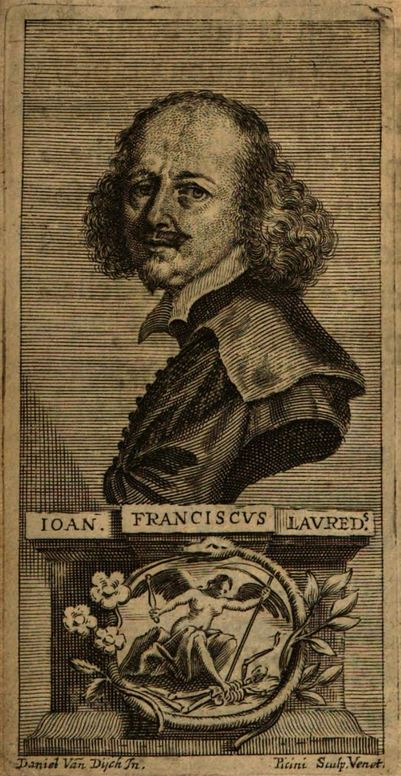
Portrait of Giovanni Francesco Loredan, by Daniel van den Dyck

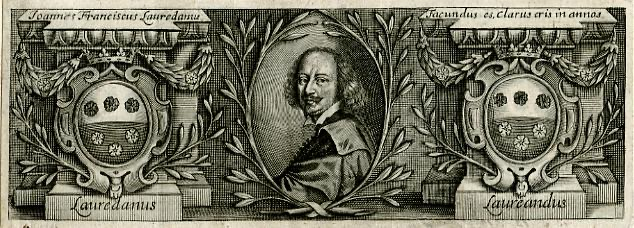
Giovanni Francesco Loredan, print by William Faithorne, 1681, British Museum, London

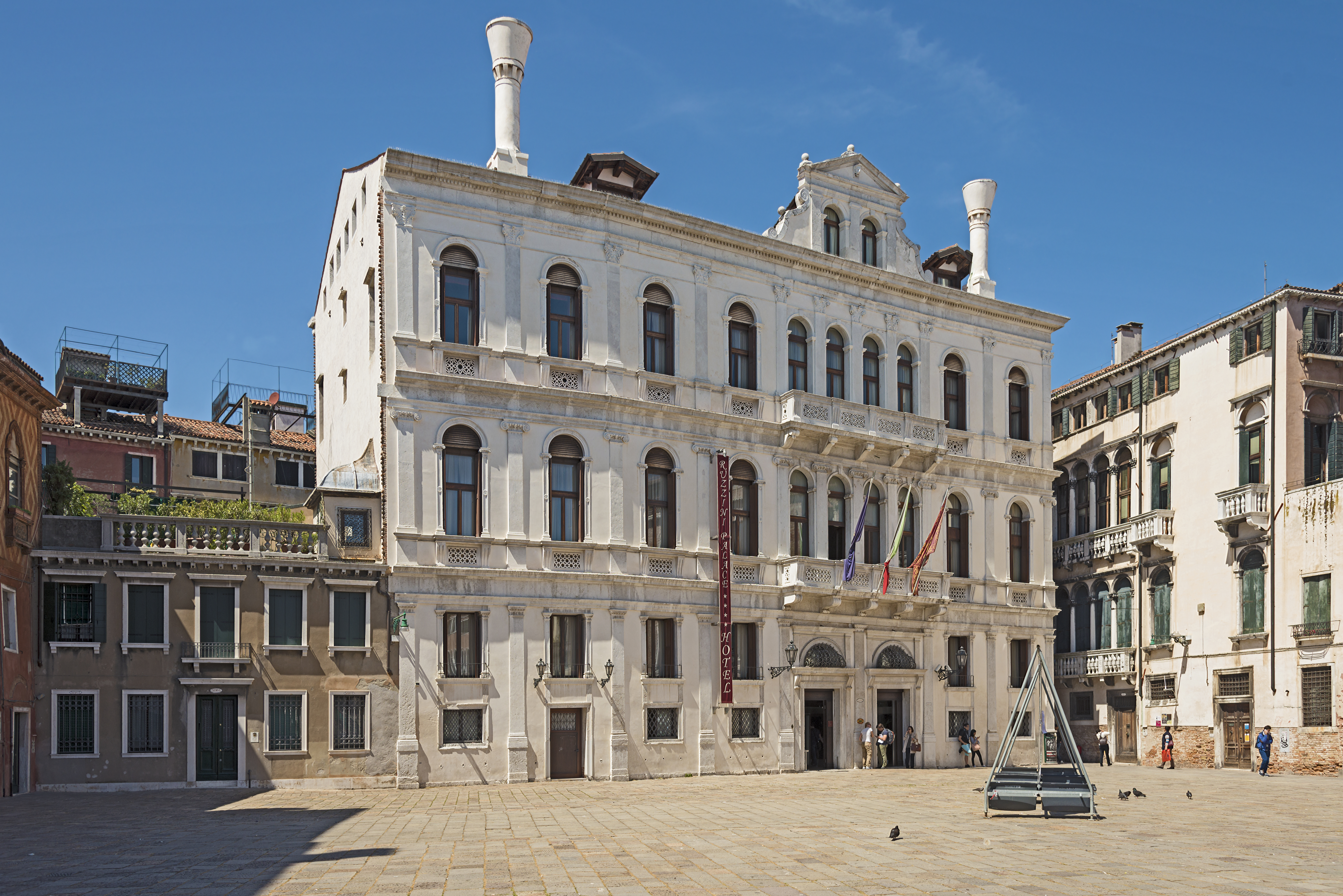
Palazzo Loredan a Santa Maria

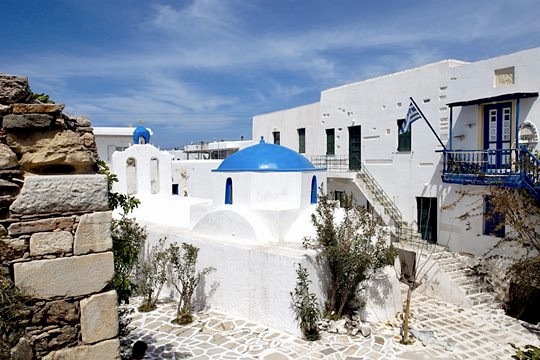
Castle of Antiparos, built by Giovanni Loredan, Lord of Antiparos in 1440

== Notes ==
- a: Although most Venetian nobles usually came to Dalmatian cities on political or military duty, and stayed until the end of their term, branches of some Venetian noble families, such as the Loredans, the Venier, and the da Mosto families, settled in and around Zara.
- b: In the actual Venetian language, his name was Pie[t]ro Loredano; in contemporary Greek sources, he is encountered as Πέτρος Λορδᾶς, Λαυρεδάνος, or Λορδάνο.
