= Giorgio Loredan =

15th-century Venetian nobleman

- Count of Zadar, Chioggia and Padua
- Born: before 1404; Venice
- Died: 1475 (aged 71 at least); Venice
- Offices: Avogadoria de Comùn; Council of Ten; Savi del Consiglio; Venetian Senate
- Family: House of Loredan
- Father: Marco di Fantino Loredan

Giorgio Loredan (died 1475) was a Venetian nobleman, admiral, military general and politician of the Loredan family, known for investigating political crimes and scandals as head of the Council of Ten.

== Early life and family ==
Giorgio Loredan was born in Venice, in the parish of San Canciano, between the end of the fourteenth and the beginning of the fifteenth century, and certainly before 1404, of Marco di Fantino Loredan and a woman of unknown lineage. The name of Giorgio's wife (a daughter of Nicolò Gabriel) and the year of marriage are also unknown. This reticence of sources regarding his private life can be explained by the fact that he had no children, as well as his only brother, Andrea, for which this nucleus of the family died out with them.

Giorgio was part of the conspicuous branch of the Loredan di San Cancian, who in the fifteenth century gave the Republic the most prestigious commanders of the Venetian navy, all of whom reached the dignity of Procurator of Saint Mark, so it is not surprising that the first news concerning him precisely to serve on the sea; it was not he, but the namesake brother of the Captain General Pietro Loredan, the commander of the small Cretan squad that on 14 August 1431 received the order from the Senate to cross between Corfu and Capo Colonne to intercept the Genoese ships, while the bulk of the fleet entered the Tyrrhenian Sea. This is not the only homonym one encounters in reconstructing the biography of Giorgio. In those years a Giorgio Loredan by Francesco was also politically active, so the three co-presences involve many problems of identification, especially when the sources do not specify the father's name or provide other useful information.

== Career ==
Giorgio was certainly the one who, on 5 March 1434 proved that he had reached the age of thirty, so as to be able to take command of a galley of the "Muda" of Flanders. Three years later, in 1437, he was leading the entire convoy, albeit on a shorter route, that of Beirut. The trip ended in January 1438, when Loredan was summoned to the Senate to report on the situation of the Venetian merchants in Syria, whom the sultan of Egypt prevented from leaving Damascus due to certain pending matters concerning the payment of a large consignment of pepper. A few months later he was appointed podestà in Chioggia, while the conflict with Milan was rekindling, in which Loredan was involved.

Due to the passage of the Visconti ranks of the Marquis of Mantua, Gianfrancesco I Gonzaga, Venice was preparing a team of galleys and armed ships to be employed on the Po by the fortress of Sermide. On 11 July 1438 the Senate ordered Giorgio, who had left Chioggia to go to the Adige near Legnago, to send Maffeo Molin, captain of the armed boats. The podesteria of Loredan was therefore resolved in a work of support the ships that operated on the Adige and on the Po, albeit with unfortunate results, given the repeated failures they encountered.

Loredan carried out his task with appreciable ability, since on 1 June 1439, he was elected among the three Wise Men of War. Just then Venice had secured the contribution of Francesco Sforza, through whom it aimed to break the siege of Brescia, which Niccolò Piccinino's troops had closed in October of the previous year; the conflict proceeded in alternating phases.

On 14 January 1440 Loredan was appointed ship captain and on 25 January 1440 an officer at the Cazude, a financial magistracy of little importance that he held for a few months, and on 6 June 1440 he left Venice at the helm of the Muda of Flanders, the same one he had six years earlier as a simple prison commander. Upon his return he was elected captain in Zadar, where he entered on 23 October 1441, replacing Antonio Pesaro in the post; he was in turn taken over by Marino Sanuto on 21 March 1444. At the end of his mandate he was ducal councilor from October 1444 to September 1445, then resumed serving in the fleet with the higher rank of Captain of the Gulf. The interminable conflict with Milan was about to rekindle and shortly thereafter it would undergo a radical change with the death of Filippo Maria Visconti on 13 August 1447. A few months earlier, on 23 May 1447, the Senate wrote to Loredan, who was with the fleet in Ancona, to send to the Arsenal the weapons (spears and bows) he had found in a ship captured off Pesaro; with some delay, seven years later, on 23 June 1454, the College took steps to reclaim the fourth part of the estimated value of these weapons from Loredan, in accordance with the provisions of the law. Again, on 23 May 1447, Loredan was ordered to go to Ravenna, to defend it from a possible coup by Sforza, who was moving up from the Marches towards Lombardy; subsequently he would have to resume flowing along the Adriatic coast up to Ancona. The sudden death of Visconti precipitated the situation; after the first successes of the Venetians, Sforza recaptured Cremona without any help being offered by the thirty-two armed boats sent to the Po with Andrea Querini, nor by the four galleys that flanked them under the command of Loredan.

The war still continued when Loredan was elected captain in Padua, where in August 1449 he took over from Zaccaria Bembo. The economic and cultural vivacity of the city (Donatello was active there at the time) attracted the attention of various power groups, some attributable to the kinship of the doge himself, Francesco Foscari, others to the ousted da Carrara family. Loredan therefore had to grapple with a complex network of intrigues, as well as supplying the troops, incessantly urged by the persistence of a conflict that was fought on two fronts, river and land.

Loredan returned to Venice in July 1450; in October he was appointed ducal councilor of the Cannaregio district for the second time, a position he held until September 1451. Later he was elected captain of the four galleys of the Muda of Aigues-Mortes, but he preferred to give up, and on 5 March 1452 the Senate provided for his replacement. Once again a councilor of Cannaregio since October of that year, at the end of his mandate he became a member of the Council of Ten for the first time, as can be deduced from a document of 31 July 1454 in which his name appears. Later, Giorgio was again elected captain of Padua, where he worked in a less difficult context than five years earlier, until 1456, when he was replaced by Leonardo Contarini. On 1 October that year he again joined the Council of Ten until September 1457, but his presence is also documented among the Savi del Consiglio in the period between 16 December 1456 and 14 March 1457.

It was a particularly delicate moment for Venetian internal politics. On 19 October 1457, the Council of Ten imposed the abdication of the old Doge of Venice, Francesco Foscari. Much of historiography wanted to trace the reasons back to the mortal hatred that for decades opposed the Foscari to the Loredans (in this circumstance, among the leaders of the Ten was Giacomo Loredan). Giorgio had no direct part in this, having been out from his office for almost three weeks. It is likely that an event of such importance and officially motivated only by the too advanced age of the doge, which prevented him from fulfilling his duties, had been debated and prepared for some time now, and that therefore Giorgio took part in the preliminary discussions (in September 1457 he was head of the Ten), then started at the conclusion by his relative Giacomo.

It was certainly Giorgio, however, still head of the Council of Ten, who instructed the trial in June 1457 against the conspiracy of thirty-seven patricians who had agreed among themselves to favour each other in the ballotings for the Great Council and the Senate. For this purpose, a few days earlier, on 28 May 1457, the Ten urged his return to Venice, from where he had temporarily departed and went to Treviso to question the mayor Alvise Baffo about the behavior of his son Lorenzo, Francesco Bon, Andrea Corner, Francesco Canal, Alvise Lombardo and Bartolomeo Pisani, the latter sought after for "detestable excesses"; almost all of them ended up condemned to exile. After his stay among the Ten, Loredan was elected senator (1 October 1457 - 30 September 1458) and Wise Man of the Chambers; then, as evidence of the prestige achieved, on 1 October 1458 he again joined the Council of Ten, of which he was head in December 1458 and in March 1459.

A further confirmation of the political (and economic) rise of Giorgio is shown by his presence among the procurators of the rich hospital of Santi Giovanni e Paolo on 6 March 1459. On 24 June 1459 he was elected ducal councilor for the Cannaregio district, but the appointment was cancelled because he had moved a few months ago to Giudecca, in the Dorsoduro district, so his cousin Lorenzo di Daniele Loredan took over. From San Canciano, therefore, Giorgio had brought his residence to Giudecca, exactly as Alvise Loredan di Giovanni had done a few years earlier, which may perhaps suggest the hypothesis of a lasting link between the different nuclei of the family, once all gathered in the district of San Canciano, in Cannaregio.

As proof, on 30 June 1459 Giorgio, which the sources henceforth define "major", became part of the Savi del Consiglio for three months, and at the end of the mandate, on 3 October, Giacomo Loredan took over, with whom in these years Giorgio alternated several times in the college. As a Wise Man of the council, on 28 July 1459, he proposed to convene the Senate for the following day, in order to decide on the sending of ambassadors to the Margraviate of Mantua, which should have created a league of Christian allies with an anti-Turkish function. Pope Pius II was the soul of the initiative, since after the Fall of Constantinople Europe seemed to exist without reacting to the progressive expansion of the Ottomans in the Aegean and in the Balkans, where only Skanderbeg knew how to organise a heroic but insufficient resistance. The Senate, however, was divided; many, in fact, were afraid of finding themselves fighting against a powerful enemy without a concrete common contribution, as had happened at other times. At the end of the debate, it was decided to send two legates to Mantua, who were chosen in the persons of the knight Orsotto Giustinian and the doctor Ludovico Foscarini; the commissions, however, were late in being released by the Senate, so that, in the face of protests from the Holy See, on 3 September 1459 Giorgio, with his colleague Matteo Vitturi and the Savio di Terraferma, Paolo Morosini, managed to get the date of departure voted for, which was set for the 15th of September.

The reasons for this position taken by Loredan are not known, that is, we do not know whether it was simply a question of a pro-pontifical attitude or of the will to resolutely oppose Sultan Mehmed II. It can be noted that Loredan, during the next long war sustained by the Republic alone against the Porta (1463–1479), did not hold any position in the Maritime Army, as it would have been his relatives Alvise, Antonio and Giacomo, while on 5 March 1460, once again assuming the functions of head of the Council of Ten, he had a provision of the Senate in the matter of benefits overruled, damaging the interests of Cardinal Pietro Barbo, bishop of Padua and future Pope Paul II.

On 1f October 1459, Loredan joined the Council of Ten again, of which he was head for the months of December and March 1460. At the end of the year he was elected Avogador de Comùn, and then he was among the 41 electors who on 12 May 1462 chose the new doge in the figure of Cristoforo Moro, of very advanced age but, at least in verbal interventions, a strong advocate of the anti-Ottoman "crusade" strenuously advocated by Pius II.

The following year Venice really entered the war against the Porta, and Ludovico Sforza tried in every way to avoid any direct involvement (but he had to go to meet the pope in Ancona, in August 1464) and Loredan, as it has been said, did not play a part in it. He spent his last years in Venice, continuing to hold prestigious positions within the Signoria, but not central to the government's foreign policy, since his name no longer appears among the Savi del Consiglio.

He was thus again ducal councilor from October 1466 to September 1467, then Avogador di Comùn in 1468, among the five correctors of the promissione ducale in the election of Doge Nicolò Tron in November 1471, among the 41 electors of Doge Nicolò Marcello on 13 August 1473. Then, on 28 October 1474, he was elected Procurator of Saint Mark de Ultra.

The merits of Giorgio Loredan, are found above all in the long actions of "political police" exercised among the Ten; a work, silent and obscure, certainly important and delicate, but not of such importance as to motivate such a great honour, especially in consideration of the fact that there was no shortage of conspicuous emergencies in Venice at the time; therefore the hypothesis that with this appointment the Maggior Consiglio intended to reward the Loredan family as a whole, for the great merits acquired in the service of the homeland in the Maritime Army. The branch of San Cancian, in fact, had enjoyed the dignity of procuration with Pietro, Alvise and Giacomo; compared to these, Giorgio was only a relative not too close, but his election would have represented a link in the chain of conjunction which, in 1478, would have led to the Procuratorship the grandson of the great Pietro - Antonio Loredan. To confirm this, the role of the Giorgio was purely symbolic; in fact he had no offspring and shortly after renounced the Procuratorship; thus Priuli wrote: "And finally, full of years, as if free from ambition, having enjoyed the Procuratia for no more than five months, he refused it and died shortly after with the name of an illustrious and valiant captain and senator".

He died in Venice in 1475, in the Cannaregio district where he had returned to live, probably in the ancestral parish of San Canciano.

== Ancestry ==
House of Loredan-San Cancian (Genealogy)

Alvise Loredan	Giovanna (d. after 1404)	Bertucci Loredan	Fantino Loredan
Campagnola Lando	Pietro Loredan (1372-1438)	Giorgio Loredan	Giovanni Loredan (d. 1420)	Lorenzo Loredan	Marina Contarini	Marco Loredan
Polo Loredan	Giacomo Loredan (1396-1471)	Maria Loredan	Francesco Barbaro (1390-1454)	Andriola Negrobon	Alvise Loredan (1393-1466)	Isabella Cocco	Gerolamo Loredan	Antonio Loredan (1446-1514)	Franchescina Mòro di Baldissera	Alvise Loredan	Tommaso Loredan	Andriana Loredan	Giorgio Loredan (died 1475)	Andrea Loredan
Francesco Loredan	Giovanni Loredan	Marco Loredan	Nicolò Loredan	Lorenzo Loredan
Santa Maria Nova	Santa Maria Formosa

Note: In the Venetian language, Pietro Loredan (1372-1438) was known as Piero Loredan.

Note: Besides the four sons and a daughter listed in the tree, Lorenzo Loredan and Marina Contarini had two other sons, Bortolo and Piero, but they died at birth.
