= Giovanni Francesco Loredan =

Venetian writer and politician

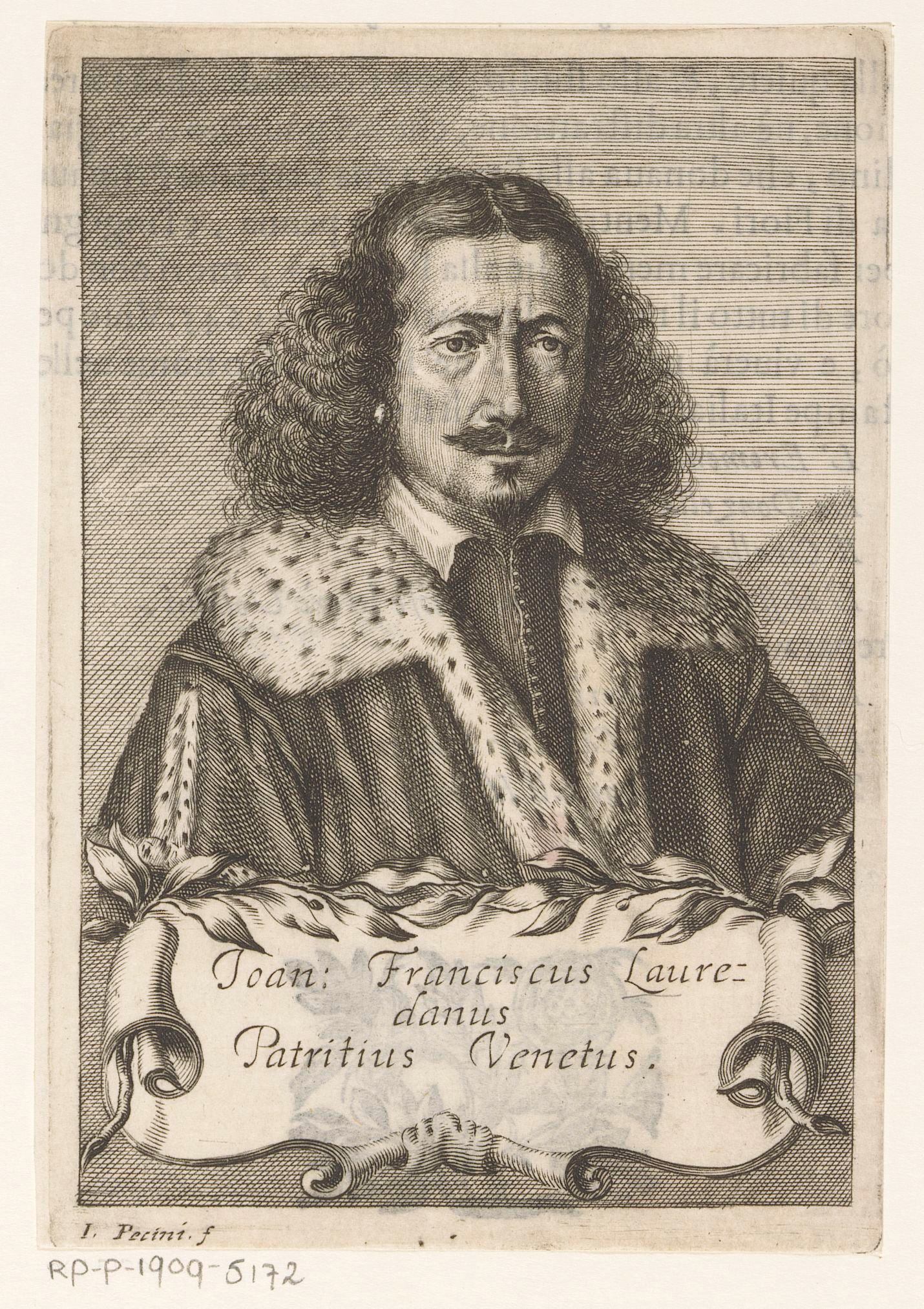
- Portrait of Giovanni Francesco Loredan, by Giacomo Piccini
- Full name: Giovanni Francesco Pietro Melchiorre
- Born: February 27, 1607; Venice
- Died: 13 August 1661 (aged 54); Peschiera del Garda, Republic of Venice
- Noble family: House of Loredan
- Spouse: Laura Valier (m. 1638)
- Issue: Antonio, Antonio Alberto, Ottavio, Lorenzo, Elena
- Father: Lorenzo Loredan
- Mother: Leonora Boldù

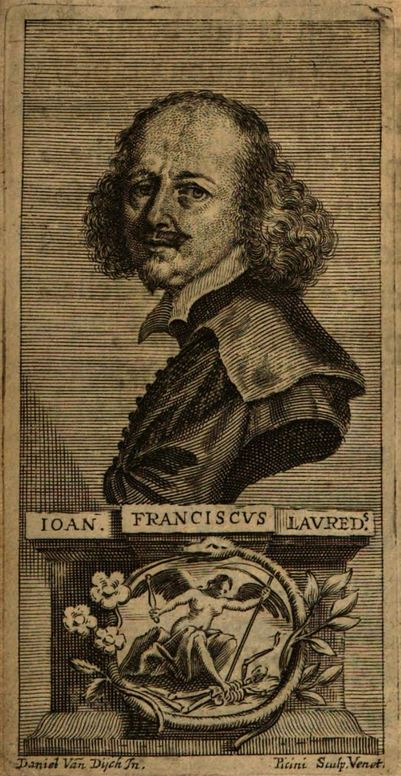
Portrait of Giovanni Francesco Loredan, by Daniel van den Dyck

Giovanni Francesco Loredan (or Loredano) (Venice, 27 February 1607 – Peschiera del Garda, 13 August 1661) was a Venetian writer and politician, and a member of the noble family of Loredan. In 1630, he founded the Accademia degli Incogniti, a learned society of freethinking intellectuals, mainly noblemen, that significantly influenced the cultural and political life of mid-17th century Venice.

== Biography ==
Giovanni Francesco Loredan was born in Venice into the Santa Maria branch of the House of Loredan as the son of Lorenzo Loredan and Leonora Boldù. When both of his parents died while he was very young, he was raised by his uncle Antonio Boldù and had as his teacher Antonio Colluraffi, repeatedly mentioned in the publications of the Accademia degli Incogniti.

He divided his youth between hard study and an extravagant lifestyle. He attended the classes of renowned Aristotelian philosopher Cesare Cremoni in Padua and began, before 1623, to gather around him that group of scholars who then formed the Accademia degli Incogniti. As founder of the Accademia degli Incogniti and a member of many other academies, he had close contact with almost all the scholars of his time. He and his circle played a decisive role in the creation of modern opera In addition to literary activity, he also took part in public affairs. At twenty he was recorded in the golden book, but his career began quite late: in September 1632 he was elected Savio agli Ordini and in 1635 he was treasurer of the fortress of Palmanova. On his return he reorganized the Accademia degli Incogniti (1636) and, in 1638, despite attempts to avoid it, he was obliged, as the only descendant of his branch, to contract marriage with Laura Valier. He was then Provveditore ai Banchi (1640), Provveditore alle Pompe (1642), and in 1648 he made the leap to the rank of Avogador del Comùn that he held several times (1651, 1656 and 1657) and Provveditore alle Biave (1653). He subsequently joined the offices of the State Inquisitor and became a member of the Council of Ten. In 1656 he entered the Minor Council, that is, among the six patricians who, together with the doge, composed the Signoria of Venice. However, he may then have been pushed out of office, as in the following years he no longer held important positions. In 1660 he was a provveditore in Peschiera. The following year (13 August 1661) he died.

== Works ==
In addition to the Scherzi Geniali (Sarzina, Venice, 1632) he wrote novels that were reprinted numerous times and also translated into French, such as La Dianea (Venice, Sarzina, 1635) and L'Adamo (Venice, Sarzina, 1640), operettas of religious subjects, as Sensi di devozione sui Sette, (Venice, Guerigli, 1652); Life of Alexander the Pope, (Venice, Sarzina, 1637); Life of St. John the Bishop of Trogir, (Venice, Guerigli, 1648); I gradi dell'anima, (Venezia, Guerigli, 1652), collections of academic essays (Bizzarrie accademiche, Venezia, Guerigli, 1655), Sei dubbi amorosi (ivi, Sarzina, 1632); Il cimiterio; epitafi giocosi (together with Pietro Michiel, Tivoli, Mancini 1646), a comic Iliad (Venice, 1654), historical compilations Ribellione e morte del Valestain, under the pseudonym of Gnaeo Falcidio Donaloro, Milan, Ghisolfi, 1634 which cost him a warning by the Inquisitors of State, Istoria de 're Lusignani, with the pseudonym of Enrico Giblet, Bologna, Monti, 1647), a Vita del Marino (Venice, Sarzina, 1633), a collection of Letters still under the pseudonym of E Giblet (Venice, Guerigli, 1653). As founder of the Accademia degli Incogniti he edited the publications of the collective works of the Academy:Cento Novelle, Venezia, Guerigli, 1651; Discorsi accademici, Venezia Sarzina, 1635; Le glorie degli incogniti, Venezia, Valvasense, 1647; Novelle amorose, Venezia, eredi del Sarzina, 1641.

== Publications ==
- Casoni, Guido and Loredano, Giovanni Francesco. 1632. Emblemi politici del Signor caualier Guido Casoni. In Venetia : Presso Paolo Baglioni.
- Loredan, Giovanni Francesco. 1651. Historie de' re Lusignani. Publicate da Henrico Giblet caualier. Libri vndeci. Venetia: Appresso li Guerigli.
- Loredan, Giovanni Francesco. 1653. Nouelle amorose di Gio. Francesco Loredano nobile veneto. Venetia: Appresso li Guerigli.
- Loredano, Giovanni Francesco. 1670. Bizzarrie academiche di Gio. Francesco Loredano Nobile Veneto. In Venetia : Appreso i Guerigli.

== Secondary Sources ==
- Accademico Eteroclito (Francesco Maidalchino), Il Loredano. Panegirico, Venice, 1634.
- Brunacci, G. (1662). Vita di Gio. Francesco Loredano senator veneto. Venice: Guerigli.
- Lupis, Antonio (1663). Vita di Giovan Francesco Loredan senator veneto. Venice: Francesco Valuasense.
- Brocchi, V. (1897–98). "L'accademia e la novella nel Seicento: Giovan Francesco Loredan". Atti del R. Istituto veneto di scienze, lettere e arti. IX: 284–311.
- Ivanoff, N. (1965). "Giovan Francesco Loredan e l'ambiente artistico a Venezia nel Seicento". Ateneo Veneto. III: 186–190.
- Morini, A. (1994). Sous le signe de l'inconstance. La vie et l'oeuvre de Giovan Francesco Loredan (1606-1661), noble vénitien, fondateur de l'Académie des Incogniti. diss., Université de Paris IV.
- Morini, A. (1997). "Giovan Francesco Loredan: sémiologie d'une crise". Revue des études italiennes. XLIII: 23–50.
- Miato, M. (1998). L'Accademia degli Incogniti di Giovan Francesco Loredan. Venezia (1630-1661). Florence: Casa Editrice Leo S. Olschki. ISBN 978-8822246-85-1.
- Morini, A. (1998). "Giovan Francesco Loredan (1606-1661): le retour à la bergerie". In Bruno Toppan (ed.). Soulèvements et ruptures: l'Italie en quête de sa révolution. Actes du Colloque du CSLI. Nancy. p. 73–88.
- Giovan Francesco Loredano (2015). L. Manini (ed.). Morte del Volestein e altre opere. Lavis: La Finestra editrice. ISBN 978-8895925-60-8.
- Rosand, Ellen (2007). Opera in Seventeenth-Century Venice: the Creation of a Genre. Berkeley: University of California Press. ISBN 978-0-520-25426-8.

== See also ==
- Accademia degli Incogniti
- House of Loredan
- Libertine
- Ferrante Pallavicino
- Antonio Rocco
- Barbara Strozzi
- Anna Renzi
- Arcangela Tarabotti
