= Marco Loredan =

Marco Loredan may refer to:

- Marco Loredan (11th century), Venetian nobleman
- Marco Loredan (bishop) (died 1577), Venetian nobleman
- Marco Loredan (politician) (1489–1557), Venetian senator
