= Admiral Loredan =

Admiral Loredan may refer to:

- Alvise Loredan (1393–1466), Venetian admiral
- Giorgio Loredan (died 1475), Venetian admiral
- Pietro Loredan (1372–1438), Venetian admiral
