= Magistrato alle pompe =

The magistrato alle pompe (lit. 'magistracy on pomp/luxury') was a government department of the Republic of Venice responsible for upholding the Republic's sumptuary laws.

== History ==
The responsibility of supervising sumptuary laws was initially divided among several different magistracies, until the creation in 1476 of a board of three officials, the savi alle pompe (lit. 'Sages on Luxury'). This office was short-lived, however, and after its abolition the tasks were again distributed to various other magistracies, including the Procurators of Saint Mark.

This led to the establishment, in 1514, of the magistrato alle pompe as a board of three provveditori alle pompe (lit. 'superintendents on luxury'), elected by the Great Council of Venice. In 1559, they were joined by two sopraprovveditori, elected by the Venetian Senate, and three years later an assistant sopraprovveditore was named, and the board given the right to legislate on the topic, a power previously held by the Senate. In 1635 four assistant sopraprovveditori were appointed temporarily for the revision of the legislation, which had become too complex, and again three in 1644, for the same purpose.

As the avogadori de comùn frequently intervened in the magistrato alle pompe's sentences, in 1652 a special board (collegio) of seven nobles was established to examine them. In 1666, one of the seven was named inquisitor with the task of reviewing all trials and sentences of the magistrato alle pompe.

From its heyday in the 17th century, the magistrato alle pompe lost its importance in the 18th century. It passed its last laws in 1749, and thereafter continued to exist by force of tradition, busying itself with minor tasks such as decoration of the city or fire-fighting.

== Sources ==
- Da Mosto, Andrea (1937). L'Archivio di Stato di Venezia. Indice Generale, Storico, Descrittivo ed Analitico. Tomo I: Archivi dell' Amministrazione Centrale della Repubblica Veneta e Archivi Notarili (in Italian). Rome: Biblioteca d'arte editrice. OCLC 772861816. Archived from the original on 2021-11-13.
