= Marco Loredan (politician) =

16th-century Venetian nobleman and senator

- Count of Brescia, Feltre, Rovigo, Salò, and Famagusta
- Born: 1489; Venice, Republic of Venice
- Died: 15 October 1557 (aged 67–68); Venice, Republic of Venice
- Buried: Church of Sant'Elena
- Offices: Senator
- Family: House of Loredan
- Spouse: Elisabetta Contarini
- Issue: Alvise, Nicolò, Giovanni, Polo, Pietro
- Father: Alvise Loredan
- Mother: Argentina Vincenzina Contarini

Marco Loredan (1489-1557) was a Venetian nobleman, senator and politician of the Loredan family, as well as Count of Brescia, Feltre, Rovigo, Salò and Famagusta, presiding over a time of famine and poverty following the War of the League of Cambrai.

== Early life and family ==
He was born in Venice in 1489, the youngest son of Alvise di Polo di Pietro, of the branch of Santa Maria Nova, and of Argentina Vincenzina Contarini di Giacomo da S. Maria Formosa.

In the family, which had made itself famous both in politics and in mercantile activity, notable is his great-grandfather Pietro Loredan, procurator, who fought in the wars against Genoa, Mantua and Milan and in 1423 was Francesco Foscari's rival in the race for the ducal seat, losing it by only one vote, and a great-aunt Maria, wife of Francesco and mother of Zaccaria Barbaro, famous humanists. His father, an administrator in the army, died in 1502 after a dignified career, leaving his numerous children, besides Marco, three boys and six girls, to the care of his wife.

From his wife Elisabetta di Nicolò Contarini, whom he married in 1532, he had, in addition to his daughters, Pietro (1541–65), Alvise (1533–60), murdered, Giovanni (1537–71) killed in the Battle of Lepanto in command of a galley, Nicolò (1534–60) and Polo (1540–93), continuer of the family. The testament of 1547, permeated with a sincere wish for family harmony, divided the inheritance equally among all the children, assigning the residence of S. Maria Nova to males only.

== Career ==
His career, at first modest, had a qualitative leap from the 1530s on. Returning to the Senate in 1532, failing the election as captain in Vicenza, in March 1533 he obtained that of podestà and captain in Feltre, starting on 2 July. The territory still bore the signs of the devastation caused by the recent War of the League of Cambrai and the inhabitants were afflicted by poverty. Marco, while not having sufficient and adequately paid personnel, worked with sensitivity and constancy to alleviate the pains of the population. On this reality and on the defensive shortcomings, Loredan dwelt in the report read in the Senate in 1534. On 28 October 1537 he was appointed administrator in Salò and captain of the Brescia Riviera. He had found, as he wrote in the report presented on 18 June 1539, a regiment with little obedience, a high crime rate and flourishing food smuggling operations in favour of neighbouring towns and states. The impoverishment of resources, the misery of the population and the serious damage to the treasury could have been dealt with, he suggested, by strengthening the means and establishing a body to be paid with the proceeds of criminal convictions.

After being elected in 1542 to oversee tithes in Rialto, in February 1543 he went as captain to Brescia, where, in charge of the defensive system, he did his utmost to keep the structures entrusted to him efficient, increasing the guns and ammunition with a more rational use of local technical and production resources. Returning to Venice in 1544, he entered the Senate and the following year he was appointed ordinary senator and member of the electors of Doge Pietro Lando. In June 1547 he was elected captain and podestà in Rovigo, which he found to be in the throes of "competitions and hostilities" among the most eminent families, with grave danger for the public peace already compromised by ancient feuds. Loredan, acting with energy and thanks to the support of the Council of Ten, managed to impose tranquility and order. In the report presented on 26 September 1548, however, he ignored these facts, focusing instead on the tax damage caused by the failure to collect the duties and proceeds of the numerous fiefdoms of this territory, due to an irrational management of public goods and the infidelity of officials.

Returning to Venice at the end of 1548, he entered the Senate again, and was elected as procurator, and on 2 November 1550 he was appointed captain in Famagusta, Cyprus, taking office on 1 June 1551 and completing it in May 1553.

Both the dispatches and the final report are missing from his stay in Cyprus, but the commissions entrusted to him in March 1551 show a priority interest of the Senate for the efficiency of the fortifications and the port and for the well-being of the population, important for the stability of that Venetian dominion. Recalled, after his return, to the Senate, unsuccessfully running for the Council of Ten, he was elected administrator of the Salò in 1555 and again, in 1557, he was elected senator.

He was still vested with that office when, on 15 October 1557, Marco died in Venice and was buried, as he had wished, in the Church of Sant'Elena.
