= Domenico Malipiero =

Domenico Malipiero (1428–1515) was a naval captain from a patrician Venetian family who passed his youth in maritime commerce on his family's behalf and became a Venetian senator in 1465. He held a command in the War of Ferrara (1482–1484), fought to relieve the siege of Pisa and was eventually made Admiral of the Fleet. Before that, at the capture of Gallipoli in Apulia, the captain-general was shot down on his poop deck as the battle was about to commence; Malipiero modestly and matter-of-factly recounts that he spread a sheet over the captain's body and put it about that the captain was merely severely wounded. In semi-retirement from his maritime career he served as the Venetian governor of Rovigo (1494), Rimini (1505), Napoli di Romania (1510) and of Treviso in the year of his death.

He kept a chronicle in the Venetian language of the history of Venice which runs from 1457 to 1500, and offers details of the Venetian wars with the Sultan. Malipiero's Annali, the Diarii of Marino Sanudo and the diaries of Girolamo Priuli are the triumvirate of primary sources for Renaissance Venice, "a full, vivacious and veracious narrative of Venetian history, of life in the city, of wars and intrigues of the Republic, during her splendour and the beginning of her decline (1457–1535)" In the later sixteenth century the diaries came into the hands of Francesco Longo, who made an abridged copy of them, which was printed under the title Annali veneti dell'anno 1457–1500. The originals have disappeared.
