= Antonio Loredan =

Venetian noble, politician, and general

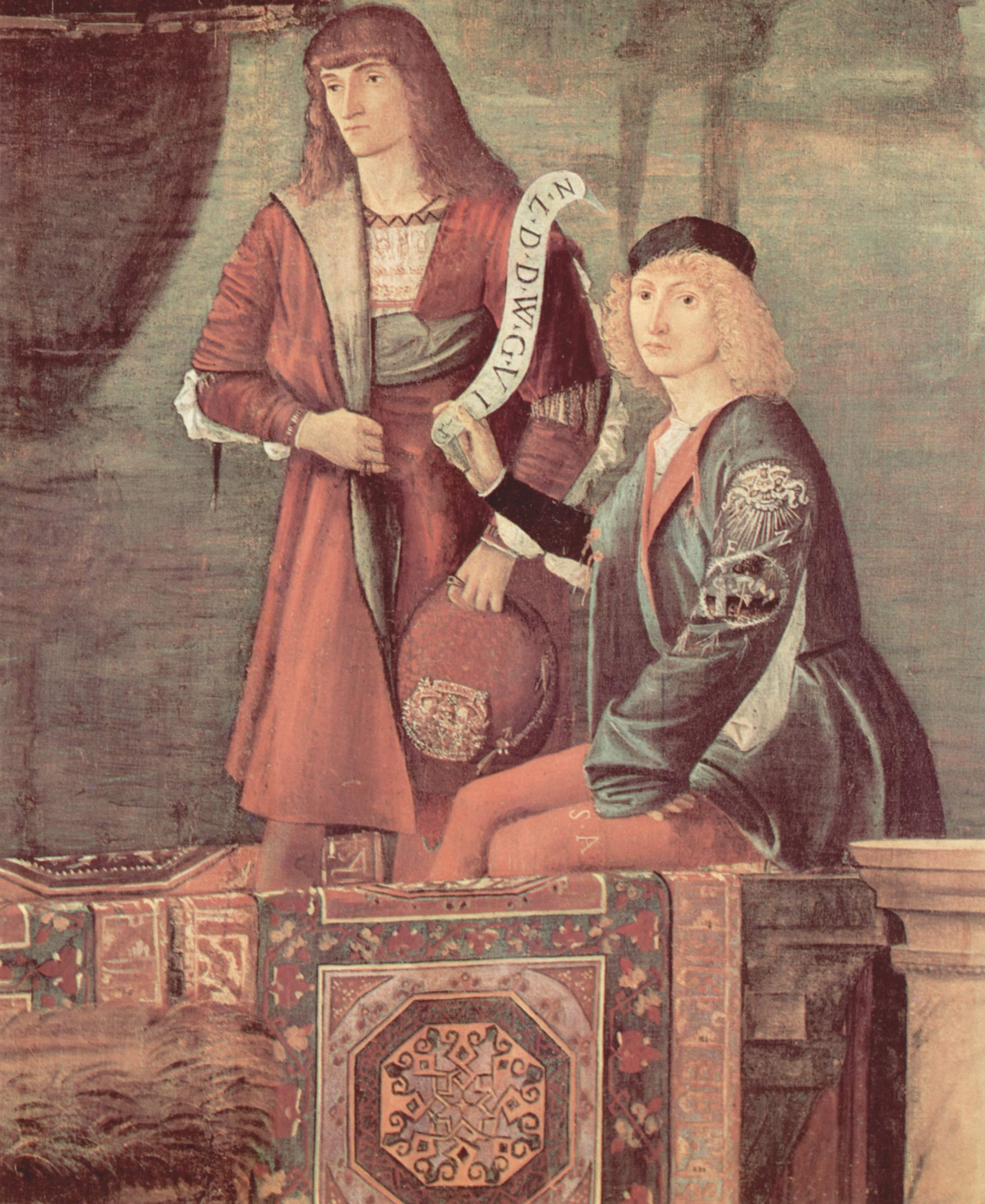
- Antonio Loredan (on the right) with a Young Man, by Vittore Carpaccio, 1495, Gallerie dell'Accademia
- Born: 1420
- Died: August 1482 (aged 61–62)
- Occupations: Military Officer and Governor
- Known for: successful defence of Scutari and commissioning the Legend of Saint Ursula
- Spouse: Orsola Pisani
- Children: Giovanni Loredan, Marco Loredan, Jacopo Loredan
- Parent(s): Giacomo Loredan; Beatrice Marcello
- Family: House of Loredan
- Honours: Order of Saint Mark

Antonio Loredan (Latin: Antonius Lauretanus; 1420 – August 1482) was a member of the Venetian noble family of Loredan, captain of Venetian-held Scutari (Shkodër in modern Albania) and governor in Split (Venetian Dalmatia), Albania Veneta, and the Morea.

== Family ==
Antonio Loredan was born into the Santa Maria branch of the noble House of Loredan. His wife was Orsa (Orsola) Pisani, with whom he had three sons: Giovanni, Marco and Jacopo.

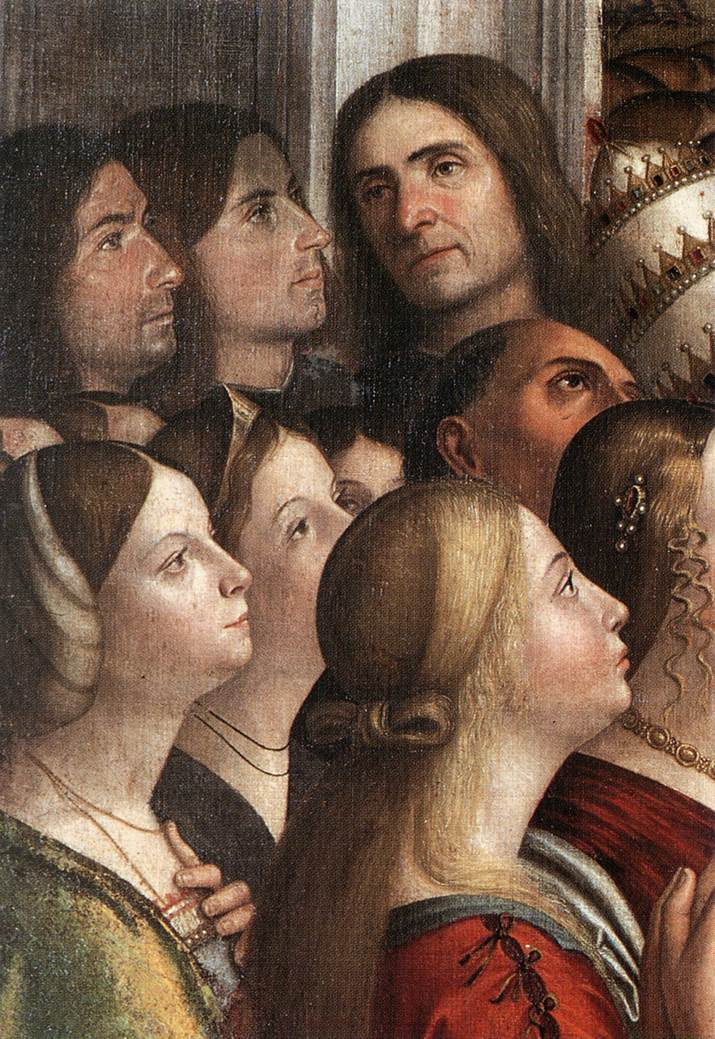
The three sons of Antonio Loredan, detail from the Apotheosis of Saint Ursula, by Vittore Carpaccio, 1491, Gallerie dell'Accademia, Venice.

== Morea and Dalmatia ==
In 1466 Loredan was governor in the Morea. In the period 1467—69 he was a governor of Split in Venetian Dalmatia.

== Albania Veneta ==
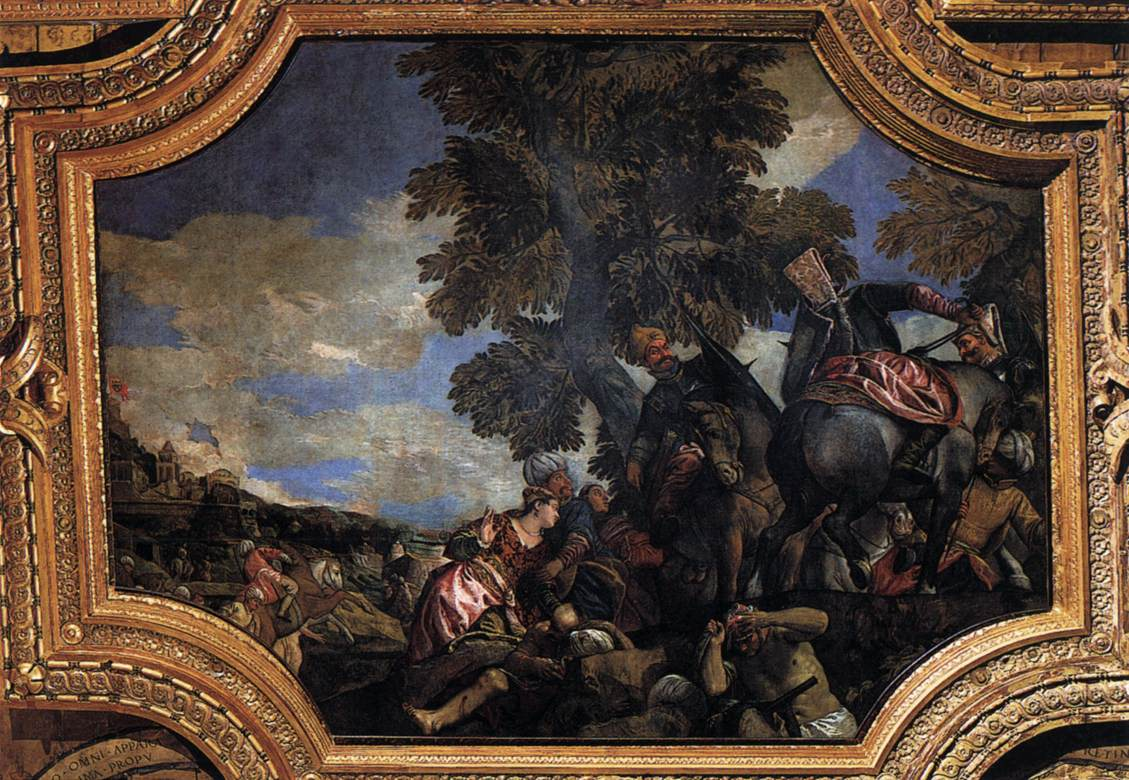
Antonio Loredan directs the assault for the liberation of Scutari from the siege by Mehmed II - Paolo Veronese, 1585, Doge's Palace.

Loredan was appointed as captain of Scutari and governor of Albania Veneta on 12 July 1473.

He was one of Venetian military commanders during the Siege of Shkodra (1474). According to some sources, when Scutari garrison complained for lack of food and water, Loredan told them "If you are hungry, here is my flesh; if you are thirsty, I give you my blood."

Because of the successful defense of the city he was considered a war hero. Venetian government awarded Loredan with title of "Knight of San Marco". To celebrate this victory Venetians decided on 4 September 1474 to construct a hospital.

== Cyprus and Venice ==
After successful defense of Scutari, Loredan was ordered by the Venetian government to seize Cyprus and garrison its castles after destroying Ottoman forts on Bojana first. The purpose of this move was to prevent the Republic of Genoa to use unstable situation at Cyprus and capture it first.

In 1478 Loredan was elected as a Procurator of San Marco. He died of marsh fever in 1482, during the War of Ferrara.

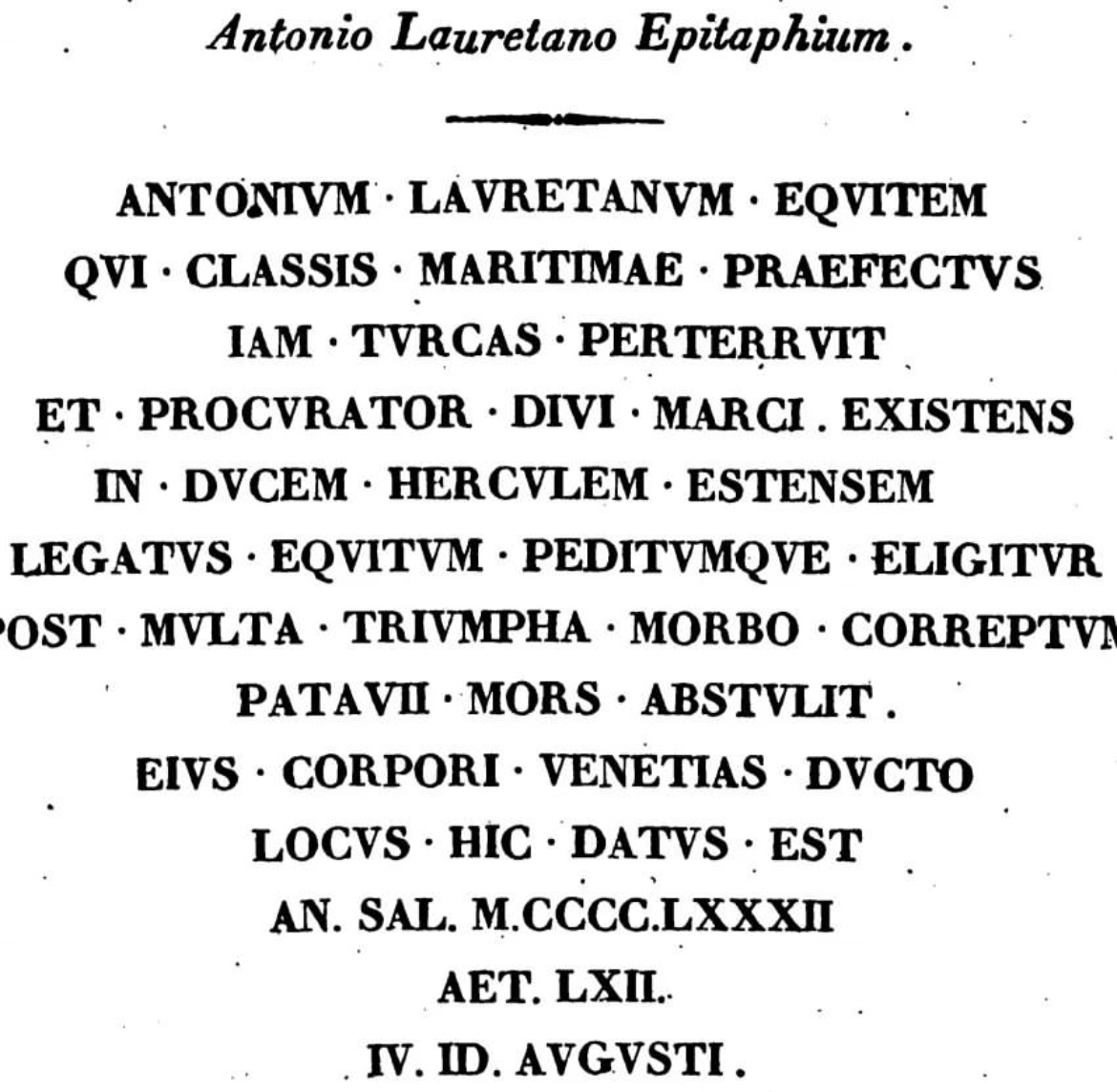
Epitaph in Latin

== In literature and the arts ==
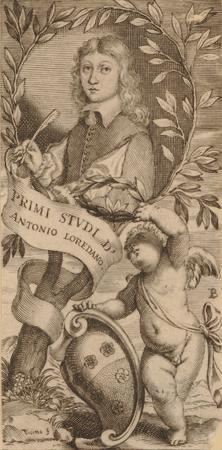
Print of Antonio Loredan, by Giacomo Piccini, 1662, British Museum, London

Loredan is mentioned in many works of literature, such as those authored by Stjepan Mitrov Ljubiša and Marin Barleti.
