= Giacomo Loredan =

15th-century Venetian nobleman and general

- Duke of Friuli, Count of Brescia and Crema
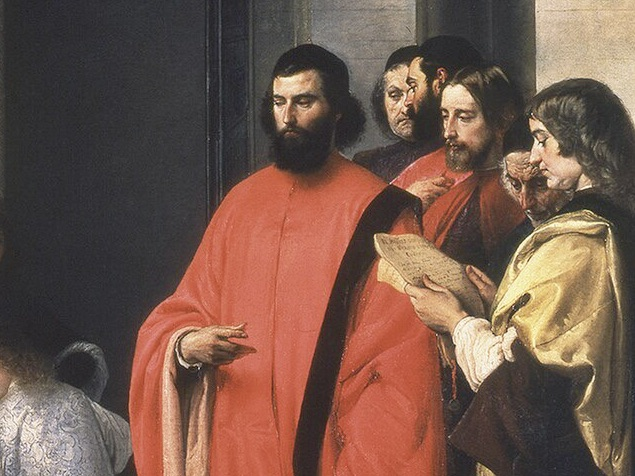
- Giacomo Loredan, detail from Doge Francesco Foscari's Removal, by Francesco Hayez, 1844, Pinacoteca di Brera, Milan
- Born: 1396; Venice
- Died: 3 November 1471 (aged 74–75); Venice
- Buried: Church of Sant'Elena
- Offices: Captain General of the Sea; Captain of the Gulf; Podestà of Padua
- Family: House of Loredan
- Spouse: Beatrice Marcello
- Issue: Antonio Loredan, Luca Loredan, and others
- Father: Pietro Loredan
- Mother: Campagnola Lando

Giacomo Loredan (1396-1471) was a Venetian nobleman, admiral and military general of the Loredan family, who served as Captain of the Gulf and three times as Captain General of the Sea in the Venetian Navy.

== Early life and family ==
The eldest son of the famous admiral and Procurator of Saint Mark Pietro Loredan and of Campagnola Lando di Vitale, he was born in Venice in the first half of 1396 and, like his father, married in time, contrary to the practice then in use among fellow citizens: in 1419 he married Beatrice Marcello di Francesco, with whom he had several children, including Antonio Loredan.

== Career ==
In his youth he devoted himself to trading (on 2 March 1430 he was appointed patron of the galleys of Flanders and in 1443 his son Luca was in Damascus) but without too much success. Soon, therefore, he joined, or perhaps even replaced, private activity with public, and on 2 February 1432 he was given command of a galley in the campaign led by his father against the Genoese in the Tyrrhenian Sea. A few months later, on 16 December, he was elected Captain of the Gulf.

For the next five years there was no news of Giacomo, but it is likely that he continued to serve in the fleet. On 26 November 1437 he accompanied his father on a delicate mission to Gianfrancesco Gonzaga, Marquis of Mantua, in an attempt to prevent his passage into the opposing camp. There was a war, in fact, between Venice and Milan and the events did not turn in favor of Venice, whose forces were hardly engaged in the Brescia area. On 3 April 1438 Giacomo failed to be elected vice-captain in the Gulf, but on 11 July he was appointed superintendent of the thirty armed boats that were to operate on the Adige, while his father assumed command of the army on the Po. Shortly thereafter, however, on 28 October Pietro died; on 26 October Giacomo had obtained repatriation, in all probability to be with him in his last days and provide for the burial. The funeral inscription explicitly indicates poisoning as the cause of Pietro Loredan's death and many authors identify the principal as Doge Francesco Foscari, whose enmity with the deceased procurator was known.

The following year, Loredan resumed service in the fleet; in May 1439 he brought Holy Roman Emperor Frederick III to Palestine and on 20 August he obtained command of the muda of Flanders; the long journey, which also touched Southampton, ended on 21 July 1440. In October 1440, Loredan took over as captain of Brescia from his brother-in-law Francesco Barbaro, who had animated the defense of the city during the memorable siege against the Visconti troops. He stayed there for a long time, until the spring of 1442, after which he was councilor for the sestiere of San Marco in Venice and on 1 October he joined the Council of Ten for a year. On 29 October, moreover, he was appointed supervisor for the preparation of fifty new galleys. In October 1443, his son Luca was in Syria to trade, so it is probable that Giacomo was also involved in this activity; this would explain the absence of his name from politics until 23 June 1446, when he was elected Captain of the Gulf in place of Lorenzo Minio. There was a question of keeping Ancona in alliance with Venice and supporting Francesco Sforza's reasons for Pesaro, while extorting the trade of Fano and Rimini, then under the dominion of Sigismondo Malatesta. Loredan spent the whole summer running along the Adriatic coast. Then, on 1 October, he rejoined the Council of Ten and in this capacity on 31 May 1447 he was tasked with instructing the trial against Andrea Donà, son-in-law of the Doge, accused of treason, just as Jacopo Foscari had been two years earlier.

Between autumn of 1447 and autumn 1448 he was podestà in Padua, a difficult city, at the center of economic appetites on the part of the Venetian rulers, but also of resurgent pro-Carrarese plots. On 10 December 1448 he was elected administrator in the operations aimed at the reconquest of Crema; on the 19th he was given the commissions and he went to Orzinuovi, with the troops commanded by Sigismondo Malatesta. In a particularly harsh winter, Loredan had to ensure to the troops the necessary supplies and the means to support the siege which, however, proved inconclusive. Loredan remained in Lombardy until the beginning of July 1449, on the eve of peace, which was stipulated in the following September.

On 8 July 1449 Loredan was in Venice, where he assumed the position of Savio del Consiglio until 30 September, when he became ducal councillor for the sestiere of San Marco. On 24 October he was elected administrator in Crema, which the peace treaty had assigned to Venice, but he refused. He accepted instead, on 6 January 1450, to go with Tommaso Duodo, both with the double title of ambassador and administrator, to the captain general of the Venetian army, Sigismondo Malatesta, where Andrea Dandolo already worked, with the task of supplying Brescia from the Veronese and completing the difficult negotiation with Francesco Sforza, who aimed to become Lord of Milan, as in fact would happen shortly thereafter. In the frenetic evolution of events, the intrigues and ambitions of the leaders intertwined: this explains the reproach addressed by the Senate to Loredan and Duodo, on 29 January, for not having sufficiently worked with Bartolomeo Colleoni, despite the previous instructions to observe all possible savings. On 23 March 1450 Loredan was in Bergamo together with Andrea Dandolo, but by now the game was resolved in favor of Sforza and on 2 July there was peace. Two days later, Loredan appears to be a Savio del Consiglio, but shortly thereafter he was elected luogotenente in Friuli, where he stayed until September 1451. Then, on 1 October, he joined the Council of Ten. The succession of assignments continued intensely; on 20 May 1452 he refused the appointment as administrator in the Veronese area; three days later he was among the wise men of the Council even though at the same time he was part of the Ten: on 1 July, in fact, the Great Council of Venice replaced him in this second magistracy, having accepted the appointment (on 19 June) of administrator in Brescia, together with Antonio Diedo. In fact, the war with Milan had resumed and the opposing armies were facing each other in the Brescia area, sacking the villages and devastating the crops. While Diedo remained in the city, Loredan went to the camp to keep in touch with the commander of the Venetian troops, Gentile da Leonessa. While tilting in favor of the Venetians, the conflict continued for a long time. In the meantime, Constantinople was about to fall into the hands of the Ottoman Empire. On 7 February 1453 the Signoria therefore elected Girolamo Barbarigo as administrator in place of Loredan, who on 2 March was appointed Captain General of the Sea, the same position that his father had so often held with honour.

On 7 May he was given instructions inspired by the greatest prudence; essentially the Signoria sent Bartolomeo Marcello as a mediator of peace, hoping for an agreement, but Loredan did not have time to reach Constantinople: the news of the Fall of Constantinople reached him in Negroponte. At this point, while the Senate was negotiating with Sultan Mehmed II, Loredan was ordered to proceed with the conquest of some islands and to damage the Ottoman settlements in the Dardanelles Straits. The Venetian fleet was cruising the Aegean Sea for the whole of 1454, then took refuge in Modon, while Loredan repatriated to take his place among the Savi del Consiglio; the mandate should have covered the first half of 1455, instead it extended well beyond.

On 30 April 1455, Loredan was elected to the embassy "of obedience", which took place in June, to the new Pope Callixtus III, together with Ludovico Foscarini, Triadano Gritti and Pasquale Malipiero. Then, on 1 October, he joined the Council of Ten, while continuing to sit among the Savi del Consiglio.

He was appointed to audit the tax chambers on 17 April 1456, and then, on 1 June, to welcome Cardinal Isidore of Kiev. In the same month of June he was head of the Council of Ten, when once again the magistrate proceeded against Jacopo Foscari, decreeing his perpetual banishment to Chania, on the island of Crete. In the popular imagination, the names of the Foscari and Loredan had to remain linked to a sort of generational feud, partly documented, partly due to certain historiographic bias; and yet it is undeniable how, in the crucial moments that marked the life of Francesco and Jacopo Foscari, a Loredan was always present.

A member of the Savi del Consiglio between March and September 1457, in October Giacomo once again entered the Council of Ten and it was he, as head of the council, who on 19 October imposed the abdication on the doge.

In the years that followed, Loredan sat almost uninterruptedly among the Savi del Consiglio (22 times, according to Girolamo Priuli). He left on 11 September 1458 to be part of the embassy to the newly elected Pope Pius II. Appointed podestà in Padua in December 1460, Loredan stayed there until the spring of 1462; he was then Savio del Consiglio until August 1464; then, although 68 years old, he was nominated for the second time as Captain General of the Sea.

Elected on 7 April, he received commissions on 4 September, when he was already in the Levant; the war against the Turks, in the Morea, after a brilliant start was turning badly for the Venetians; Loredan's task was to raise the morale of the troops and at the same time weaken that of the adversaries, carrying out raids in the Straits, which he managed to block with his forty-two galleys. After having wintered in Candia, in May 1465 Loredan went back to the Dardanelles, but in fact these maneuvers were inconclusive, so Loredan was induced to ask for repatriation, which was granted to him on 13 September owing to precarious health conditions; he was replaced in Negroponte by Vettore Cappello on 9 February 1466.

He was again Savio del Consiglio from August 1466 to March 1467. On 15 April 1467 he was elected Captain General of the Sea for the third time against the Ottomans; this time, however, it was not a question of conquering the Morea, but of defending Negroponte: the fate of the conflict now turned decidedly in favour of the Turks.

Loredan left immediately and remained in the Levant for a year and a half, organizing amphibious strikes, carrying out ephemeral conquests, carrying out raids and fighting pirates, without ever reaching a decisive clash with the enemy fleet. He returned to Venice on 17 November 1468 to demobilize part of the fleet, with surprising decision his position was not renewed, and was instead entrusted to the inept Nicolò Canal.

On 6 September 1467 Loredan was elected Procurator of San Marco de Citra. He resumed being part of the Savi del Consiglio, a position he held from the beginning of 1469 until his death, refusing, however, any other position, such as that of provveditore in the field against the Duke of Milan, and ambassador "of obedience" to Pope Sixtus IV.

He died in Venice on 3 November 1471 and was buried next to his father, in the Monastery of Sant'Elena. For his many merits towards his homeland, his portrait was placed in the hall of the Great Council in the Doge's Palace, where it remained until the fire of 1577. According to Priuli, he was "handsome in body and very vigorous, prudent, just and liberal".

== Sources ==
- Gullino, Giuseppe (2005). "Loredan, Giacomo". Dizionario Biografico degli Italiani (in Italian). Vol. 65: Levis–Lorenzetti. Rome: Institute of the Italian Encyclopaedia. ISBN 978-88-12-00032-6.
