= Pietro Loredan (admiral) =

Italian noble and admiral

- Born: 1372; Venice
- Died: 28 October 1438 (aged c. 66); Venice
- Burial place: Monastery of St. Helena
- Spouse: Campagnola Vitale Lando di Pietro
- Children: Polo, Giacomo, Maria
- Relatives: Alvise Loredan (nephew); Francesco Barbaro (son-in-law)
- Military career
- Allegiance: Republic of Venice
- Service years: 1403–1438
- Rank: Captain-General of the Sea; Governor-General of Dalmatia
- Wars: Battle of Modon, Battle of Gallipoli, Battle of Motta, Venetian conquest of Dalmatia, War over Thessalonica, Wars in Lombardy

Pietro Loredan (Venetian: Pie[t]ro Loredan; 1372 – 28 October 1438) was a Venetian nobleman of the Loredan family and a distinguished military commander both on sea and on land. He fought against the Ottomans, winning the Battle of Gallipoli (1416), played a leading role in the conquest of Dalmatia in 1411–1420, and participated in several campaigns against Venice's Italian rivals, Genoa and Milan, to secure Venice's mainland domains (Terraferma). He also held a number of senior political positions as Avogador de Comùn, ducal councillor, and governor of Zara, Friuli, and Brescia, and was honoured with the position of Procurator of St Mark's in 1425. In 1423, he contended for the position of Doge of Venice, but lost to his bitter rival Francesco Foscari; their rivalry was such that when Loredan died, Foscari was suspected of having poisoned him.

== Early life and career ==
Pietro Loredan was born in 1372, in the parish of St. Canciano in Venice. He was a scion of a veritable dynasty of admirals: his father Alvise Loredan and grandfather, and later his son Giacomo and nephew Alvise, were all distinguished naval commanders in the service of the Republic of Venice. His father was further distinguished by being elected to the highly prestigious position of Procurator of St Mark's. His mother, Joan, appears to have been from a wealthy family. Pietro Loredan married at a young age, probably in 1395, to Campagnola Vitale Lando di Pietro. Some historians report a second marriage, to a Foscolo, in 1422, but as Campagnola survived her husband and is still mentioned in his will, this is evidently erroneous.

Loredan commanded the galley which, at Manfredonia in June 1401, the young Michael of Rhodes (known for his Book of Michael of Rhodes) joined as an oarsman. In 1403, he served as commander of one of the three galleys that conveyed the Byzantine emperor Manuel II Palaiologos (r. 1391–1425) back to Constantinople, after his voyage in the courts of Western Europe. On the return journey, the three ships joined with the Venetian fleet under Carlo Zeno, and participated in the Venetian victory against the Genoese fleet of Marshal Boucicaut at the Battle of Modon on 7 October 1403.

== Military and political career, 1411–1422 ==
Loredan probably continued to serve in the fleet thereafter, until 1411, when he is attested for the first time as fleet commander (Captain of the Gulf), at the signing of the Treaty of Selymbria between Venice and the Ottoman prince and contender for the Ottoman throne, Musa Çelebi, on 3 September 1411. He was then ordered to go to Zara in Dalmatia, as the King of Hungary (and Holy Roman Emperor-elect) Sigismund was fighting to expand into Venetian holdings. As captain-general, he obtained the capitulation of Šibenik on 21 July 1412, and hastened to the assistance of the Venetian land forces at Motta di Livenza, helping them score a decisive victory in the Battle of Motta against Sigismund's troops on 24 August. Having helped secure Dalmatia for Venice, Loredan then came into conflict with his lifelong rival, Francesco Foscari, the Doge of Venice (leader of the republic); unlike Foscari, who advocated expansion in the Italian mainland (the Terraferma), Loredan was a proponent of Venice's maritime orientation.

In October 1412, Loredan was named ducal councillor, but held the post only briefly, as he was elected governor (podesta) of Treviso. The city constituted the "pivot of the Venetian defence system in the east", and Loredan busied himself with strengthening its fortifications over the next year. On 26 June 1414, he was elected, along with Lorenzo Capello and Vitale Miani, as provveditore over Dalmatia. There he was active in the suppression of pro-Hungarian moves among the local nobility, and in the preparations for a new fortification of Zara. On 5 April 1415, he was appointed commander of the annual trade convoy (muda) to Flanders. Upon his return, he was elected as an Avogador de Comùn (public prosecutor), but again held the post for a short while because on 2 April 1416, he was chosen as captain of the Gulf to lead an expedition to the Ottoman Empire. The Great Council of Venice charged him with conveying Venetian ambassadors to the Sultan, and exhausting peaceful means, but in the event, on 29 May 1416, at the Battle of Gallipoli, Loredan scored a major victory against the Ottoman fleet, destroying or capturing most of its vessels. Loredan himself was wounded in the battle. Despite this success, the conflict was not concluded until November 1419, when a peace treaty was signed following exhaustive negotiations. Nevertheless, on his return to Venice on 8 November 1416, Loredan was feted as a hero.

In spring 1417, he was sent as an envoy to Milan to complain about the occupation of Lodi, Como, and other places whose autonomy had been guaranteed by Venice. Then he was appointed rector at Zara, where he remained until late 1418. Upon completion of his term there, he was again selected as Avogador de Comùn. In September 1419, he was elected as one of the committee of five wise men (savi di Terraferma) charged with overseeing the final phase of the Venetian conquest of Dalmatia and Friuli. As Sigismund was preoccupied with dealing with the Hussite Rebellion, the Venetians moved in to secure their claims on the eastern shore of the Adriatic Sea. Loredan was again named captain of the Gulf on 8 February 1420, and set sail from Venice on 12 May. By the end of June, he had secured the surrender of Trogir and Split, and between September and October he brought the islands of Brač, Korčula, and Hvar under Venetian control. In February 1421, he was sent to the Levant to counter the Genoese Giovanni Ambrogio Spinola, who was raiding Venetian commercial shipping in the area. On is return in summer, he was sent to Friuli as its luogotenente ("Lieutenant", i.e., governor). His selection for the post was probably influenced by the fact that the area had been conquered by his nephew, Francesco Loredan, the previous year.

On 3 November 1422, serving again as captain of the muda of Flanders, and re-appointed again as ducal councillor, he was present at the registration of his son, Francesco, in the Golden Book, the book containing the names of the nobles eligible for public office.

== Contender for the Dogate, 1423 ==
On 4 April 1423, the Doge Tommaso Mocenigo died at a critical juncture: the next Doge would have to make decisions affecting the course of the Republic, particularly regarding the continued expansion in the Terraferma or a reaffirmation of the traditional maritime policy. A successful commander, well educated and a capable orator, Loredan had all the prerequisites necessary for the position, but in the end it was his old rival, Francesco Foscari, who was elected. The two men were fierce rivals, their political differences reinforced by personal relationships. Thus two of Loredan's daughters, Maria and Marina, were married to Francesco Barbaro and Ermolao Donà respectively, both of them opponents of Foscari. Furthermore, when Foscari proposed a marriage between his own daughter and one of Loredan's sons, it was rejected.

== Military and political career, 1424–1438 ==
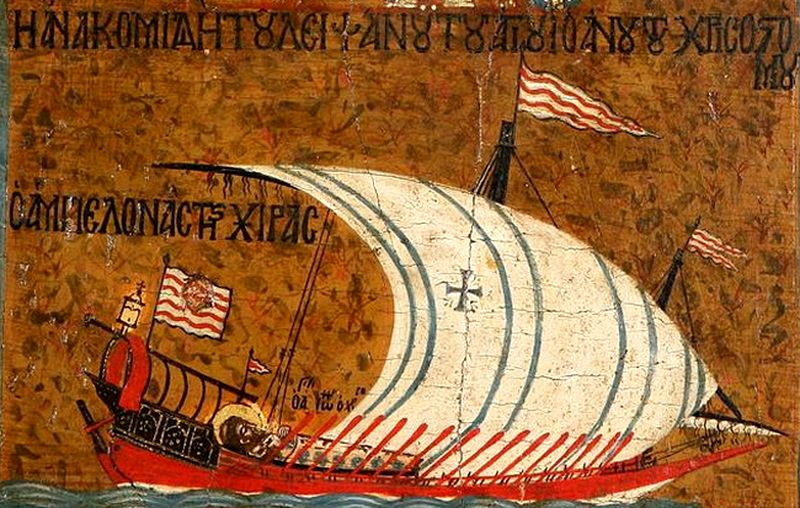
14th-century painting of a light galley, from an icon now at the Byzantine and Christian Museum at Athens

Despite this setback, on 12 January 1424, Loredan was again elected as captain-general of the Gulf, with the task of assisting Thessalonica, which the Republic had acquired the previous year, by attacking Gallipoli and applying military and diplomatic pressure on the Ottoman Sultan Murad II to recognize Venetian possession of the city. Loredan led his fleet to patrol the Dardanelles from July to October, and fought a number of engagements with the Turks. This prompted the Byzantine emperor to send Loredan a number of holy relics as a token of gratitude. Despite Loredan's activities, however, the conflict continued fruitlessly for the Venetians, amidst increasing suffering and discontent for the inhabitants of Thessalonica, until the city was conquered by the Ottomans in March 1430.

He remained savio del consiglio, until he was elected as Procurator of St Mark's on 17 June 1425. At this time, Venice decided to join the war between the ruler of Milan, Filippo Maria Visconti, and the Republic of Florence, as Visconti's successes were threatening the balance of power in Italy. In 1426, Loredan was appointed as provveditore of the army along with Fantino Michiel, and accompanied the condottiere Francesco Bussone da Carmagnola in the conquest of Brescia (10 August 1426). Loredan remained in the city as rector over the next year. In summer 1427 he repelled a Milanese attack on Brescia, and was one of the driving forces in getting Carmagnola to abandon his dilatory stance and confront the Milanese, leading to the victory of the Battle of Maclodio on 11 October.

Loredan disappears from the sources for the next few years until 1431, when the war between Venice and Milan was renewed. On 28 May 1431, he was appointed as captain-general of the Sea and charged with sailing into the Tyrrhenian Sea, joining with the Florentines, and capturing Genoa, which had joined Visconti. The Venetian fleet gained a major victory over the Genoese at Rapallo on 21 August 1431, but the Venetians failed in their efforts to overthrow the Genoese government. Loredan then led his fleet to winter in Apulia and Corfu. Returning to the Tyrrhenian Sea, he stormed the fortress of Sestri in July, where he was wounded; unable to contribute anything more to the campaign, he returned with his fleet to Venice, where they arrived on 22 October 1431.

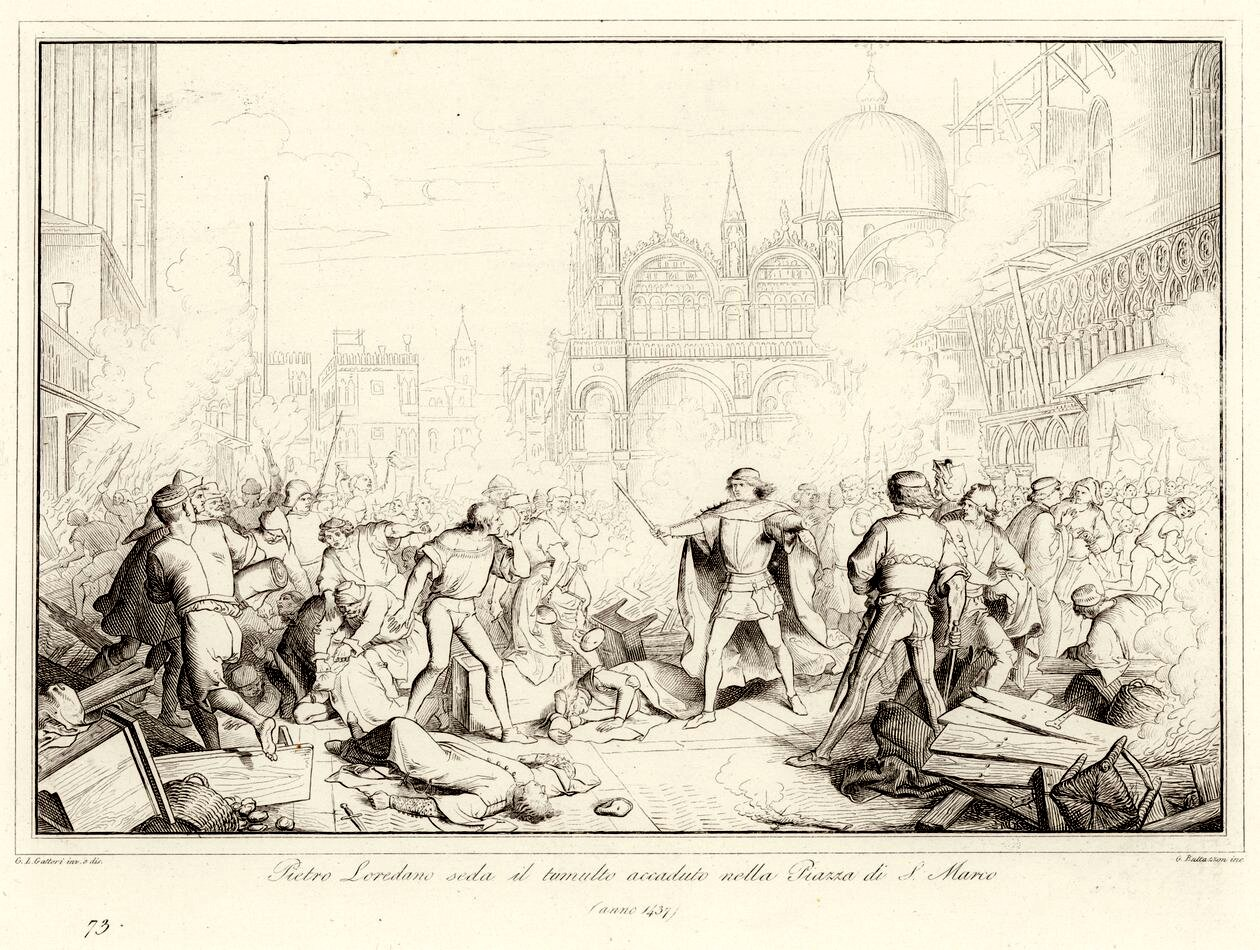
Pietro Loredan calms down rioters in the Piazza San Marco in 1437

Over the next few years, Loredan served alternately as savio del consiglio and ducal councillor for the sestiere of San Marco. When the conflict with Milan broke out again, Loredan was once again appointed provveditore of the army on 9 April 1437, under the commander-in-chief Gianfrancesco Gonzaga, Marquess of Mantua, but poor health forced him to leave his post and return to Venice, being replaced by Paolo Tron. The war began badly for the Venetians, however, and as soon as Loredan was restored to health in November, he was sent to join the army and raise its faltering morale. He was joined by his son Giacomo Loredan, who thus began his own distinguished military career. By that time, it became clear that Gonzaga was considering defecting from Venice to the Milanese. On 21 June 1438 Loredan was elected as ambassador to the Marquess, in a last-ditch effort to prevent his defection, but Loredan refused. On 13 July 1438, he was appointed commander of the naval forces on the Po River. His appearance alone was sufficient to quell a riot by the troops in the Piazza San Marco. Nevertheless, the campaign went badly: Loredan was unable to exercise his accustomed tactics in a river, his actions were dependent on the course of the land campaign, and the climate once again affected his health.

On 23 August 1438, Loredan dictated his last will, and on 21 October, obtained permission to return to Venice, being replaced by Stefano Contarini. He arrived in Venice on 26 October 1438, "molto agravato da mal" and died two days later. He was buried in the Monastery of St. Helena (demolished in the Napoleonic period). His tomb's inscription claimed that he was poisoned by unknown enemies ("per insidias hostium veneno sublatus"); popular legend ascribed the deed to the Doge Francesco Foscari. Loredan left behind a series of Commentaries, well-regarded by the contemporary historian (and Loredan's subordinate at Brescia) Flavio Biondo, but now lost.

== Notes ==
a: In contemporary Greek sources, he is encountered as Πέτρος Λορδᾶς, Λαυρεδάνος, or Λορδάνο.
b: At this time, Venice had no standing fleet. Every winter, the standing committees of the Great Council of Venice established the annual orders for the so-called "guard fleet", or "fleet of the Gulf [the Adriatic Sea]". The Great Council then voted on the proposals, the size of the fleet, and the appointment of a captain-general and the galley captains (sopracomiti) for the galleys to be outfitted in Venice. The commanders of the galleys equipped by Venetian colonies were decided by the local colonists.

== Sources ==
- Gulino, Giuseppe (2005). "LOREDAN, Pietro". Dizionario Biografico degli Italiani (in Italian). Vol. 65: Levis–Lorenzetti. Rome: Istituto dell'Enciclopedia Italiana. ISBN 978-88-12-00032-6.
- Romano, Dennis (2007). The Likeness of Venice: A Life of Doge Francesco Foscari. Yale University Press. ISBN 978-0-300-11202-3.
- Setton, Kenneth M. (1978). The Papacy and the Levant (1204–1571), Volume II: The Fifteenth Century. Vol. 2. Philadelphia: The American Philosophical Society. ISBN 0-87169-127-2.
- Stahl, Alan M. (2009). "Michael of Rhodes: Mariner in Service to Venice". In Long, Pamela O. (ed.). The Book of Michael of Rhodes: A Fifteenth-Century Maritime Manuscript. Volume III: Studies. Cambridge, Massachusetts: MIT Press. pp. 35–98. ISBN 978-0-262-12308-2.
- Trapp, Erich; Beyer, Hans-Veit; Walther, Rainer; Sturm-Schnabl, Katja; Kislinger, Ewald; Leontiadis, Ioannis; Kaplaneres, Sokrates (1976–1996). Prosopographisches Lexikon der Palaiologenzeit (in German). Vienna: Verlag der Österreichischen Akademie der Wissenschaften. ISBN 3-7001-3003-1.
