= Girolamo Priuli (1476–1547) =

Italian historian (1476–1547)

Girolamo Priuli (1476–1547) was a Venetian noble who avoided the responsibilities of public life but kept a detailed personal diary: the diaries of Girolamo Priuli, with Domenico Malipiero's Annali and the Diarii of Marino Sanudo, are the triumvirate of primary private sources for the history of the Republic of Venice during the second half of the fifteenth and first part of the sixteenth century, the Golden Age of Venice.
