= Marco Loredan (bishop) =

Venetian nobleman and Bishop of Nona

- Bishop of Nona
- Church: Roman Catholic Church
- Province: Dalmatia
- Diocese: Diocese of Nona
- Appointed: 19th of November, 1554
- In office: 19 Nov 1554 - 25 Jun 1577
- Predecessor: Jakob Diphnico
- Successor: Petar II Cedolini

Orders
- Ordination: by Pope Julius III

Personal details
- Died: 25th of June, 1577 Zara, Republic of Venice

Marco Loredan (d. 1577) was a Venetian nobleman and senator of the Loredan family who served as the Bishop of Nona (today Nin, Croatia) from 1554 to 1577 and as the Apostolic Administrator and Archbishop of Zara (today Zadar, Croatia) from 1573 until his death on the 25th of June, 1577.

He was appointed Bishop of Nona by Pope Julius III on the 19th of November, 1554, a position in which he held until 1577. He was appointed an Apostolic Administrator in Zara by Pope Gregory XIII on the 16th of November, 1573, where he stayed until his death on the 25th of June, 1577.
