= Avogadoria de Comùn =

Institution of the Republic of Venice

The Avogadori de Comùn, (transl. 'state attorneys'), were an institution of the Republic of Venice. The Avogadori were responsible for taking care of and defend the interests of the Commune Veneciarum, meaning the union of noble families in the Government of Venice, in a manner similar to that of a modern State Attorney.

The Avogadori could supervise the Camerlenghi's accounts, prosecute violations of naval laws reported by crew members, investigate allegations of corruption moves with the courts' judges or negligence of the officials, be present in the Council of Forty's legal action in all identified cases in which were at stake the interests of the municipality, that is, ultimately, the government of the oligarchy as a whole. Since 1400 the Doge himself could be taken to court for legal proceedings.

The main task of the Avogadori was the protection of constitutional legality, watching carefully the strict compliance with the laws by councils and the various organs of the Venetian state and the power to suspend the unconstitutional measures. They themselves could be prosecuted for negligence in doing their jobs, being mentioned in front of the Supreme Court of the Forty.

== Sources ==
- Da Mosto, Andrea (1937). L'Archivio di Stato di Venezia. Indice Generale, Storico, Descrittivo ed Analitico. Tomo I: Archivi dell' Amministrazione Centrale della Repubblica Veneta e Archivi Notarili (in Italian). Rome: Biblioteca d'arte editrice. OCLC 772861816. Archived from the original on 2021-11-13.
