= Procurators of Saint Mark =

Second most prestigious life appointment in the Republic of Venice

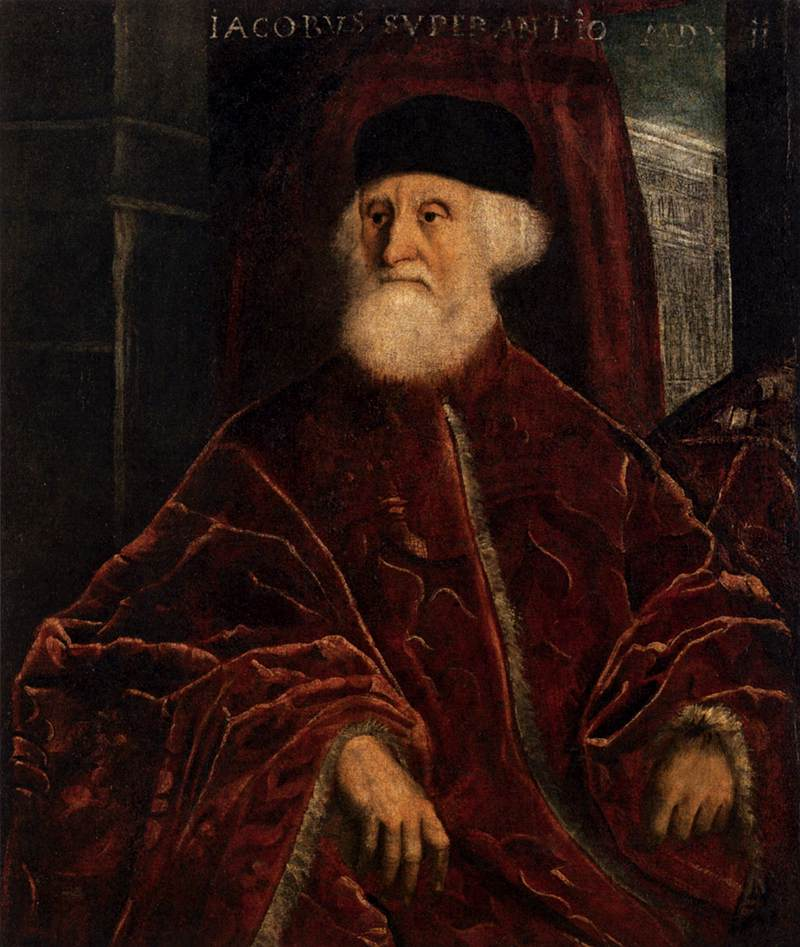
Tintoretto, Portrait of Jacopo Soranzo (1550), elected procurator de supra in 1522

The Procurators of Saint Mark (Venetian: Procuradori de San Marco) were lifelong senior magistrates in the Republic of Venice, holding the second-highest rank after the Doge and serving as custodians of the St. Mark's Basilica's assets, finances, and charitable bequests. Elected by the Senate from noble families, the position, typically numbering nine procurators divided into three colleges (di supra for basilica-centric duties, di citra for districts like San Marco and Castello, and de ultra for areas including San Polo), conferred immense prestige, with many incumbents later ascending to the dogeship and wielding influence over Venetian fiscal policy and public welfare. (Note: In the 1663 edition of Venetia città nobilissima et singolare..., Martinioni records 40 procurators who, beginning in 1275, were subsequently elected doge. For the complete list, see Sansovino and Martinioni, Venetia città nobilissima et singolare..., 1663 edn., pp 299–300.)

== Origins ==
The office of procurator of Saint Mark originated in the ninth century with a single procurator operis Sancti Marci, nominated to assist the doge in the administration of the Church of Saint Mark, the ducal chapel. Over time the number of procurators increased. A second was created in 1231 and a third in 1259. After 1261, there were four procurators, two of which, the procurators de supra (Ecclesiam sancti Marci), retained responsibility for the financial administration of the Church of Saint Mark, its upkeep, and its decoration as well as its treasury. The other two procurators, called de subtus super commissariis, administered trust funds established as pious donations on behalf of religious and charitable institutions. In 1319, there were six procurators, and in 1443 there were nine. These were divided into three procuracies: de supra (responsible for the Church of Saint Mark and its treasury), de citra (responsible for trust funds established in the sestieri (districts) of San Marco, Castello, and Cannaregio), and de ultra (responsible for trust funds established in the sestieri of San Polo, Santa Croce, and Dorsoduro).

Beginning in 1516, initially to aid in the economic recovery from the War of the League of Cambrai, supernumerary procurators could also be created in moments of financial constraint in exchange for monetary contributions to the treasury. This amounted to the periodic sale of the prestigious title. The number of procurators fluctuated thereafter: in 1521, there were eighteen. At times, the number rose to forty. The effective sale of the position also made it possible for young and ambitious nobles to quickly rise to high office and to consequently exert great influence. In the sixteenth century, notably Antonio Cappello, Vettore Grimani, Federico Contarini, and Andrea Dolfin purchased the office.

== Election ==
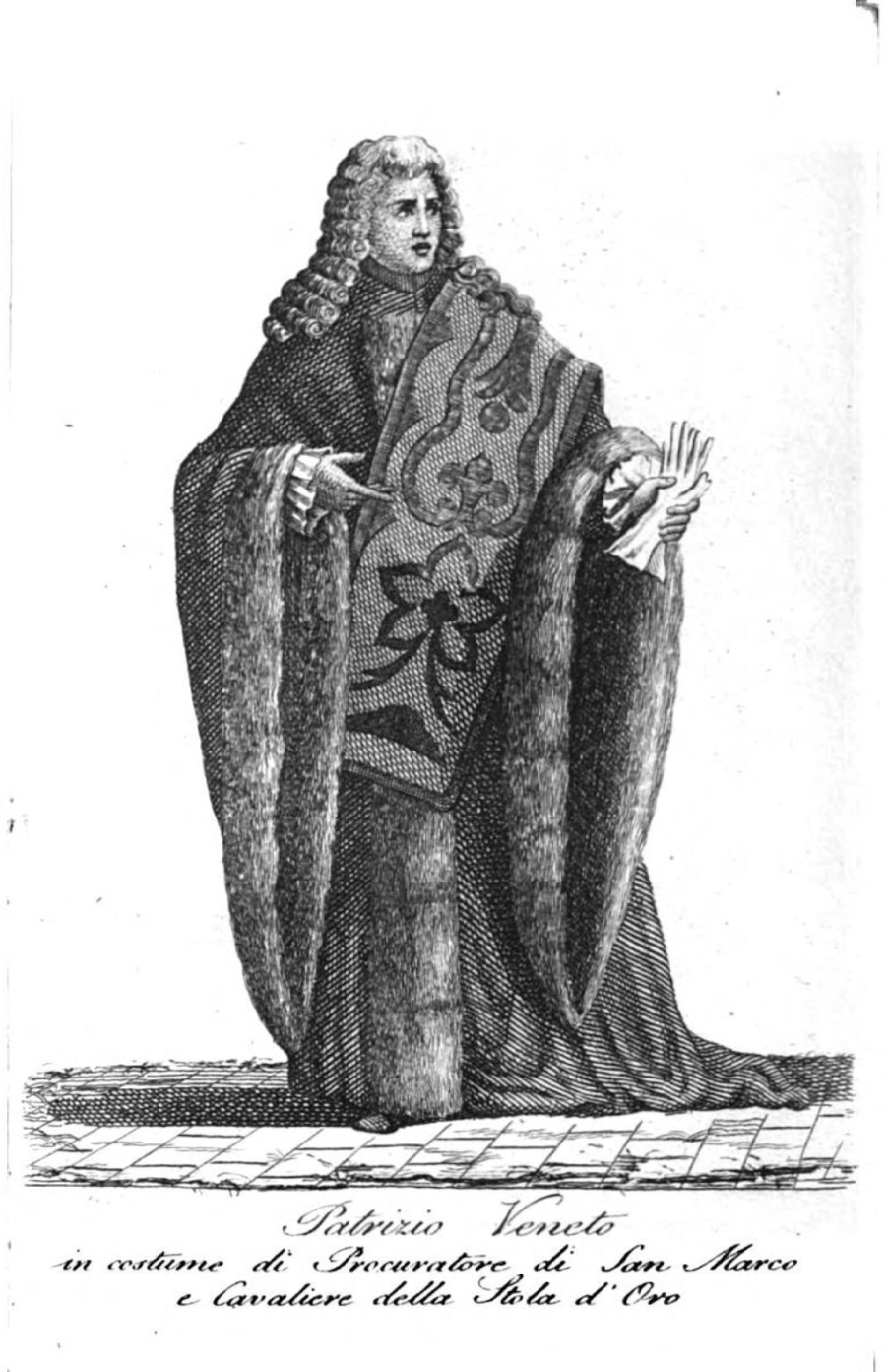
Venetian patrician in the dress of a Procurator of Saint Mark and Knight of the Order of the Golden Stole

The first procurator was chosen by the doge. But after 1231, the procurators were elected by the Great Council.

== Functions ==
In addition to the associated public honour, the office of procurator ensured an active role in the political life of Venice: after 1453, it guaranteed a seat in the Senate with the right to vote. Apart from extraordinary embassies to foreign courts, the procurators were also relieved from the obligation incumbent upon all nobles to accept political appointments, including on the Venetian mainland and in the overseas possessions, thus ensuring their presence in the city. (Note: A deliberation of 1305 required that the Great Council specifically authorize a procurator to occupy a seat on any council. Subsequently, in 1388, it was established that only one procurator for each procuracy could hold another government office. But beginning in 1569, the procurators were allowed to serve as Savio Grande. See Da Mosto, L'Archivio di Stato di Venezia…, p. 25.) The position also brought economic and financial influence through the management of vast amounts of capital and of investments in commercial and private real estate, in government bonds, and in securities and deposits. With the exception of the Doge's Palace, the procurators de supra were also specifically responsible for the construction, maintenance, and management of the public buildings around Saint Mark's Square, including the shops, food stalls, and apartments that were rented out as sources of revenue.

The Procurators' offices, called ridotti, were located on the upper floor of the Marciana Library in Saint Mark's Square.

== The office today ==
The office of Procurator of St Mark's was not abolished at the fall of the Republic of Venice in 1797. Instead, the Procurators remained responsible for administering the assets of St. Mark's Basilica, under the authority of the Patriarch of Venice.

The position was confirmed by a royal decree issued by Victor Emmanuel III of Italy in 1931. Today, there are seven procurators, with the president holding the title of First Procurator of St Mark's (Primo Procuratore di San Marco). The Procurators work closely with architects and engineers to ensure the historic preservation of St. Mark's Basilica.

== Bibliography ==
- Cappelletti, Giuseppe, Relazione storica sulle magistrature venete (Venezia: Filippi Editore, 1873)
- Da Mosto, Andrea, L'Archivio di Stato di Venezia, indice generale, storico, descrittivo ed analitico (Roma: Biblioteca d'Arte editrice, 1937)
- Howard, Deborah, 'Architectural Politics in Renaissance Venice', Proceedings of the British Academy, vol 154 (2008), 29–54
- Morresi, Manuela, Piazza san Marco: istituzioni, poteri e architettura a Venezia nel primo Cinquecento (Milano: Electa, 1999) ISBN 8843566954
- Sansovino, Francesco and Giustiniano Martinioni, Venetia città nobilissima et singolare... (Venetia: Stefano Curti, 1663), pp 299–300
- Tiepolo, Maria Francesca, 'Venezia', in La Guida generale degli Archivi di Stato, IV (Roma: Ministero per i beni culturali e ambientali, Ufficio centrale per i beni archivistici, 1994), pp. 857–1014, 1062–1070, 1076–1140 ISBN 9788871250809
