= Terra firma =

Terra firma ("solid earth" in Latin) may refer to:

- Solid earth, the planet's solid surface and its interior
- Terra firma forest, moist tropical forest that does not get seasonally flooded
- Terrafirma, the mainland territories of the Republic of Venice
- Terra Firma Capital Partners, a private equity firm

== Music ==
=== Performers ===
- Terra Firma (band), a Swedish stoner metal group

=== Albums and EPs ===
- Terra Firma (Tash Sultana album), 2021
- Terra Firma (Tommy Emmanuel and Phil Emmanuel album), 1995
- Terra Firma (Wolfstone album), 2007
- Terra Firma, by Test Dept, 1988
- Terra Firma, an EP by the Flashbulb (Benn Jordan), 2011

=== Songs ===
- "Terra Firma" (song), by the Young Knives, 2007
- "Terra Firma", by Crumbächer, 1987
- "Terra Firma", by Delerium from Poem, 2000
- "Terra Firma", by MyChildren MyBride from Lost Boy, 2010
- "Terra Firma", by Todd Rundgren from Global, 2015

== Television ==
- "Terra Firma" (Star Trek: Discovery), a double-episode of the third season of Star Trek: Discovery
- "Terra Firma" (Farscape episode)

== See also ==
- Landmass
- Terra (disambiguation)
- Firma (disambiguation)
- Tierra Firme (disambiguation)
- Terraferma (film)
- Domini di Terraferma
- Savio di Terrafirma
