= Ca' Foscari =

Palace in Venice

Coordinates: 45°26′04″N 12°19′36″E

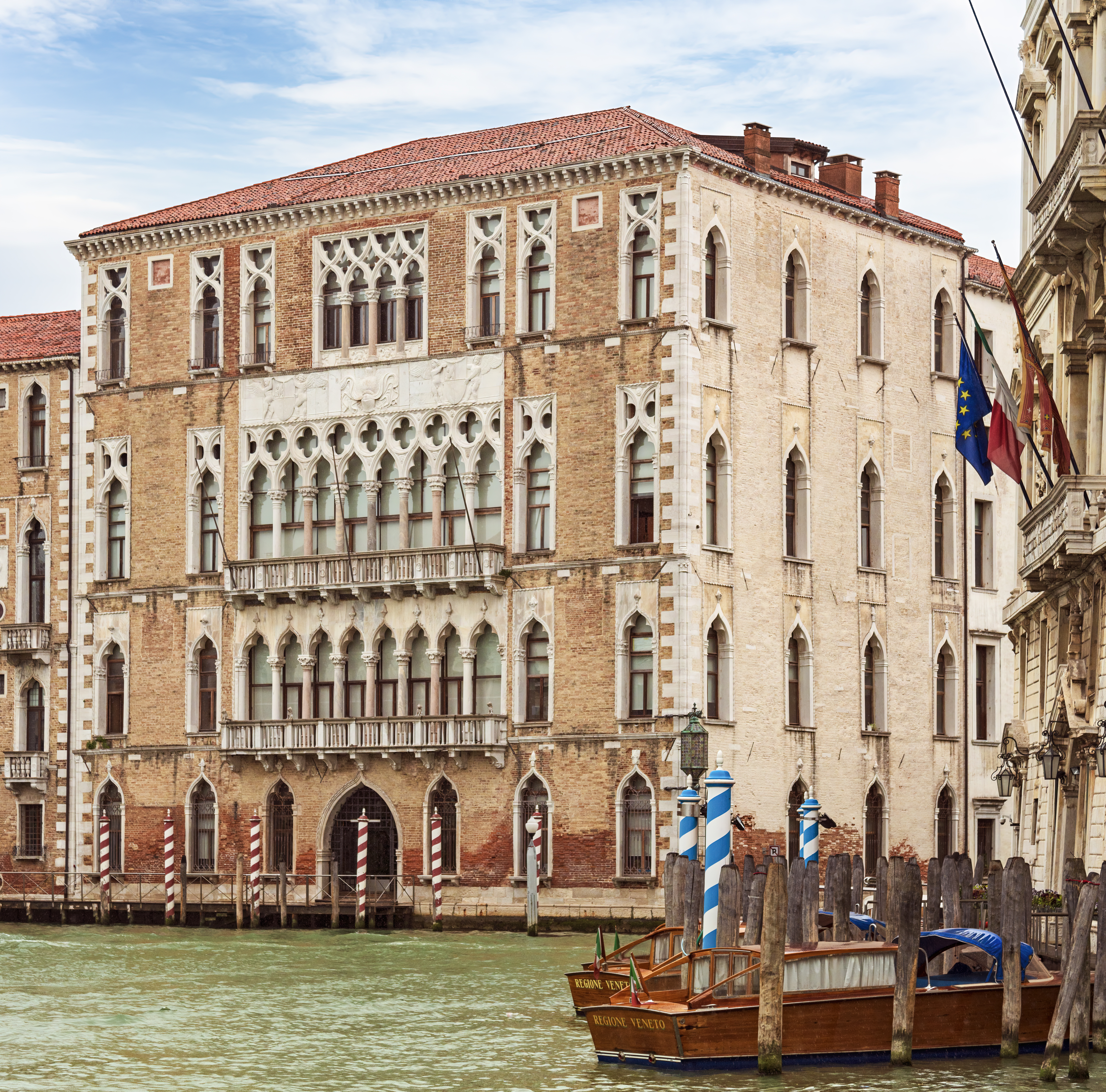
- Façade on the Grand Canal
- Click on the map for a fullscreen view

General information
- Type: Palace
- Architectural style: Gothic
- Location: Venice, Italy
- Opened: 1453
- Owner: Ca' Foscari University of Venice

Design and construction
- Architect: Bartolomeo Bon

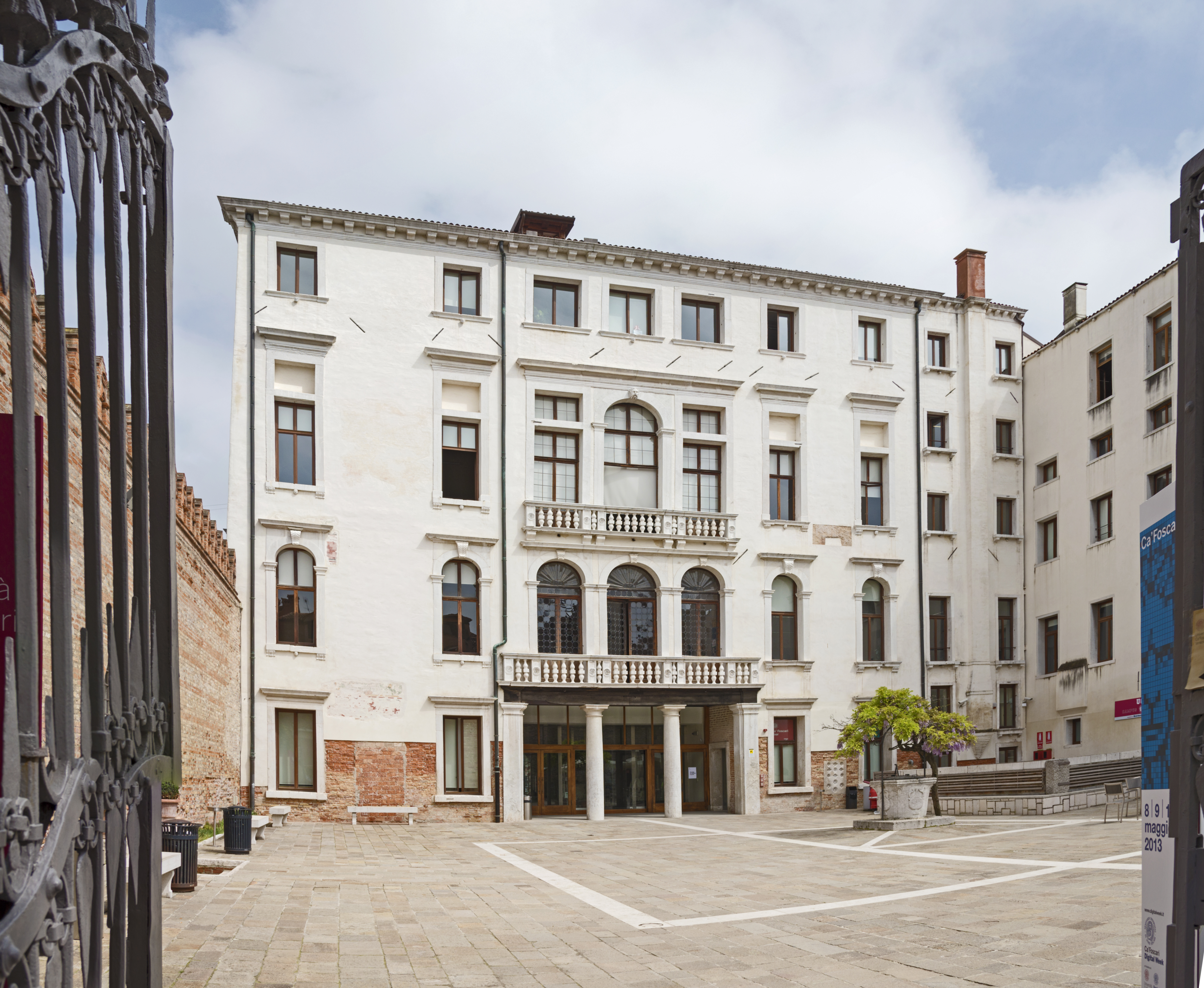
Façade on "Calle Foscari"

Ca' Foscari, the palace of the Foscari family, is a Gothic building on the waterfront of the Grand Canal in the Dorsoduro sestiere of Venice, Italy.

It was built for the doge Francesco Foscari in 1453, and designed by the architect Bartolomeo Bon. It is now the main seat of Ca' Foscari University of Venice.

The palace is located on the widest bend of the Grand Canal. Here, during the annual Regata Storica (Historical Regatta), held on the first Sunday in September, a floating wooden structure known as the La Machina is placed (from this structure the Venetian authorities watch the race); this is also the site of the finishing line, and the venue for prize-giving. A Byzantine palace known as the "House with the Two Towers" previously stood on the site. Ca' Foscari's external courtyard is the biggest courtyard of a private house after that of the Doge's Palace.

== History ==
Previously a Byzantine palace, known as the "House with the Two Towers", stood on the site. This was bought by the Republic of Venice in 1429 from Bernardo Giustinian, to be the residence of the vice-captain of the Republic, Gianfrancesco Gonzaga. The palace consisted of two towers flanking a lower, central block and was used for entertaining illustrious guests of the Republic, including kings and diplomats. In 1439, the palace was given to another captain, Francesco Sforza. However, In 1447, Francesco Sforza betrayed the Republic and was deprived of the residence.

In 1453 the Republic of Venice regained possession of the palace and sold it by auction to the Doge of the time, Francesco Foscari; he had the palace demolished and rebuilt in late Venetian gothic style; the building was chosen by the doge for its position on the Grand Canal. Foscari immediately set about rebuilding the palace in a manner befitting his status: he moved the site of the new palace forward on to the bank of the Grand Canal. Buying and rebuilding the palace for himself meant for the doge affirming his political and military role: he actually represented the continuity of the military successes of that period, lasted 30 years, and was the promoter of the Venetian expansion in the mainland (terraferma). The huge new palace could hardly have been finished when Foscari was disgraced in 1457 and retired to his new home until his death.

In 1574 king Henry III of France was housed in the second floor of the building.

The most recent restoration of Ca' Foscari and the adjacent Palazzo Giustinian was commissioned in 2004, aiming to fulfill the new requirements of safety and practicality. Work lasted from January 2004 until the summer of 2006.

The palace is the headquarters of the Ca' Foscari University, which has made accessible to the public some of the most beautiful halls, such as the "Aula Baratto" and the "Aula Berengo".

In 2013, thanks to a series of important technical measures for energy efficiency and thanks to the adoption of stringent environmental management practices put in place by the Ca' Foscari University, the building obtained the LEED certificate for sustainability, thus becoming the oldest building in the world to acquire this prestigious certification.

== Description ==
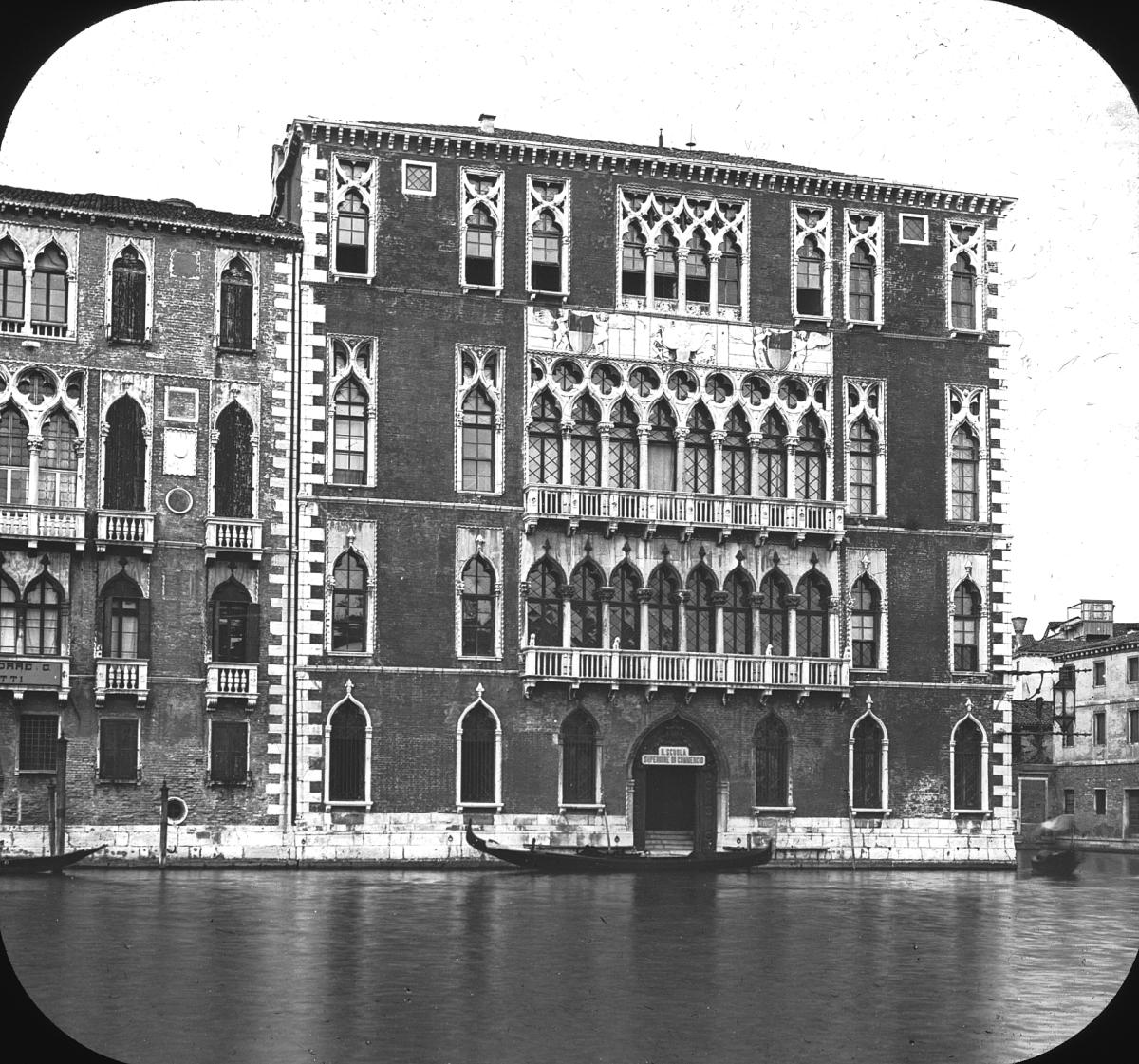
Ca' Foscari, view from across the canal

Ca' Foscari is a typical example of the residence of the Venetian nobles and merchants. The structure is one of the most imposing buildings of the city and its external courtyard is the biggest courtyard of a private house after that of the Doge's Palace. In common with other palaces, Ca' Foscari's principal and most decorated façade and entrance faced the Grand Canal—the city's main thoroughfare. This façade is characterized by a rhythmic sequence of arches and windows; this style, known as Floral Gothic, is emulated throughout the city and can be identified through the use of pointed arches and carved window heads. At Ca' Foscari, the tops of each column are decorated with carved quatrefoil patterns, whereas the Gothic capitals are adorned with foliage, animals and masks. Above the Gothic window is a marble frieze with a helmet surmounted by a lion couchant representing the role of the doge as the captain of the republic. At each side of the central helmet are two putti holding a shield symbolising the Foscari's coat of arms with the winged lion of Saint Mark, symbol of Venice.

The practical function of Venetian palaces differed from those in other Italian cities. The nobility did not derive their income from landed estates as elsewhere, but from seafaring and trade. As a result, their "fondaco" houses had to serve not only as residences but also as the headquarters for their trading ventures. The main features of these early palaces were two-storey arcades or loggias along the waterfront; on the ground floor was a portal for loading and unloading merchandise. The portal often led into an entrance hall or "portico" used for business negotiations, with storerooms and offices on either side and a kitchen at the back. The living quarters were upstairs, with the rooms leading off great T-shaped central room. A well and an open staircase were placed in the courtyard. There were low towers at each end of the façade. The House of the two Towers too used to have this structure, before Francesco Foscari decided to destroy it and rebuild it in Gothic style.

The ground floor was used as storerooms; the first and second floors ("piani nobili") were used for formal entertaining and private residential use, respectively. The central loggia of these two principal floors are designed in a similar Venetian floral Gothic style to the better known arcade of the Doge's Palace. The loggias, tied one above the other, are now glazed and light the large halls behind. The loggias are flanked by wings each of two bays containing smaller rooms.

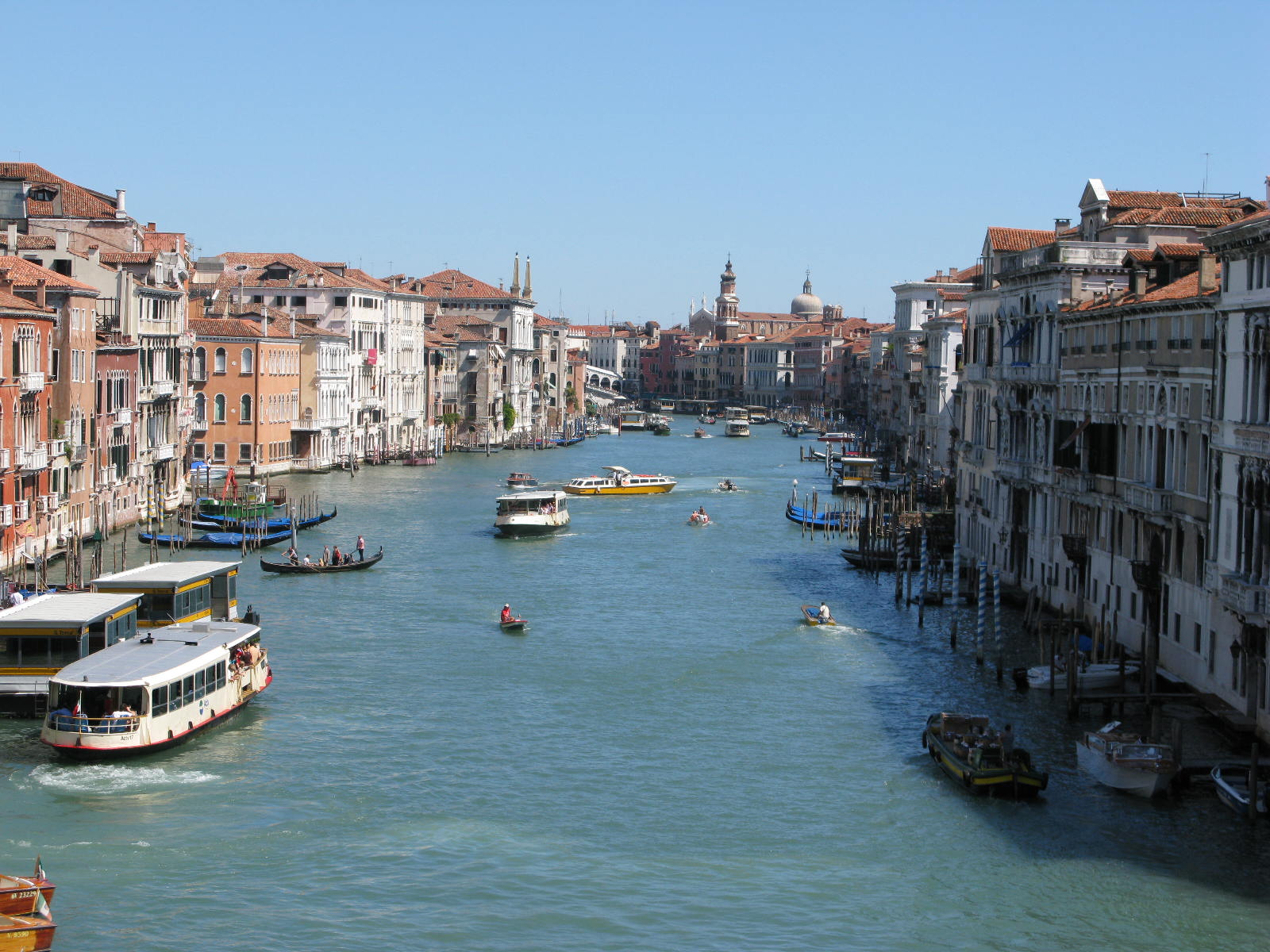
View on the Grand Canal from the second floor of Ca' Foscari

== Uses of the building ==
After the death of Francesco Foscari in 1457, the palace was used for various purposes. Some dates of events and particular uses of the building:

- 2 May 1513: Wedding party of Federico Foscari (son of Francesco Foscari) and Cecilia Venier (daughter of Giovanni Venier)
- 1516: Palace divided among the heirs of the Foscari family; used as lodgings for European royalty calling at Venice
- 1574: Accommodation (decorated with great pomp) for Henry III of France, arriving aboard the bucentaur. During this stay, the king became infatuated with Veronica Franco
- 1661: Heirs of the Foscari family take up residence in one wing of the palace; another wing rented to the Duke of Brunswick
- 1698: Secret accommodation for Peter I of Russia
- 1747: Bull hunt in the courtyard
- 1750: Fire
- 1790: Death of Francesco Foscari (diplomat and historian, born 1704), last family member to live in the palace
- 1811: Used as a theatre by amateur actors
- 1835: Used by homeless families, artists (who took advantage of the view of the Grand Canal), and shopkeepers (who used it as a warehouse)
- 1837: Start of negotiations for the purchase of the palace by municipality of Venice
- ca. 1840: Laura and Marianna Foscari (elderly daughters of Nicolò Foscari), reduced to poverty, return to live on the second floor. Meanwhile, speculators and stonecutters plunder the building and its courtyard
- 1845: Deed of purchase drawn up by municipality
- 1846-1848: Restoration work
- 1848: During Risorgimento uprisings and the establishment of a provisional government in Venice, rooms on the ground floor used as barracks by the civic guard created by Daniele Manin
- 1849: Used as temporary shelter for poor families during the bombing of Venice by the Austrians; under Austrian rule, used as army barracks
- 1866: End of the Third Italian War of Independence; municipality regains possession of the palace
- 1868: Decision to instate the Higher School of Commerce (later Ca' Foscari University) in the palace. Courses start in December 1868, even though restoration work is still ongoing
- 1936 and 1956: Restorations by Carlo Scarpa
- 2004-2006: Restoration of the palace and the adjacent Ca' Giustinian dei Vescovi. Creation of connections between the two buildings, modernisation of systems; discovery of 9th-century remains under the courtyard, and of 15th- and 16th-century elements in various rooms

=== The portal ===
The portal of Ca' Foscari is today the main entrance of the building and was restored in 2008. It is made of Istrian marble, is of rectangular shape, it is surmounted by a lunette; on its perimeter it is decorated with chequered patterns. The coat of arms inside the lunette is composed of a central blazon and three putti (one on each side and one on the top); inside the blazon is depicted the winged lion of St. Mark holding an open book. In 1797, following the forced surrender of Venice and overthrow of the Republic by General Bonaparte, family blazons were abolished; consequently, they were hidden, taken down or, as at Ca' Foscari, covered with whitewash.

=== Entrance hall ===
The entrance hall was restored in 1936 by the great Italian architect Carlo Scarpa. On that occasion Scarpa designed:

- the glass wall entrance, which reminds the window of the great hall on the second floor
- the benches (with the typical T-shape pattern present in other works by Carlo Scarpa)
- the handrail of the nineteenth-century stairway
- the lamps

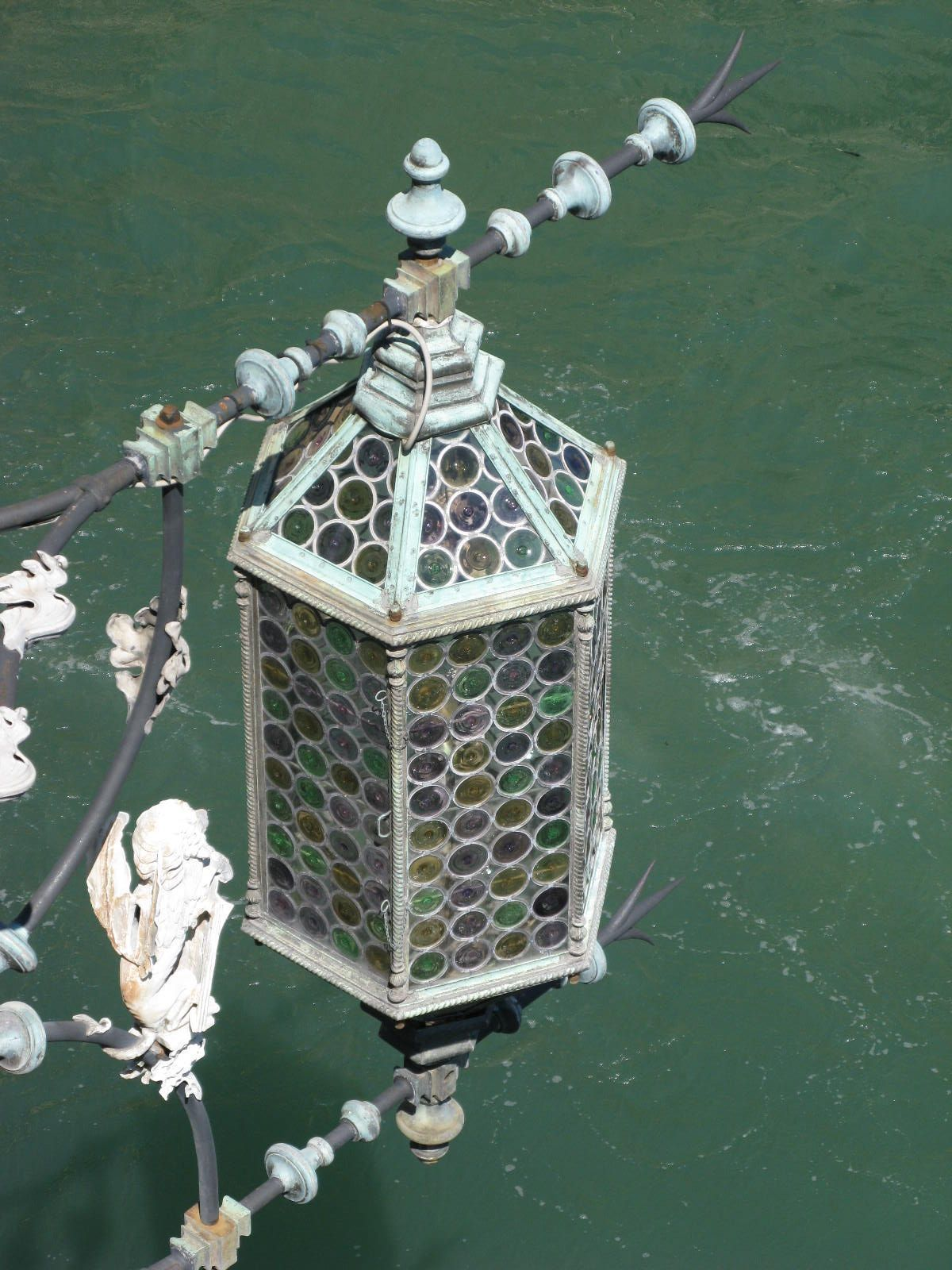
19th-century lantern in the palace

=== Mario Baratto Hall ===
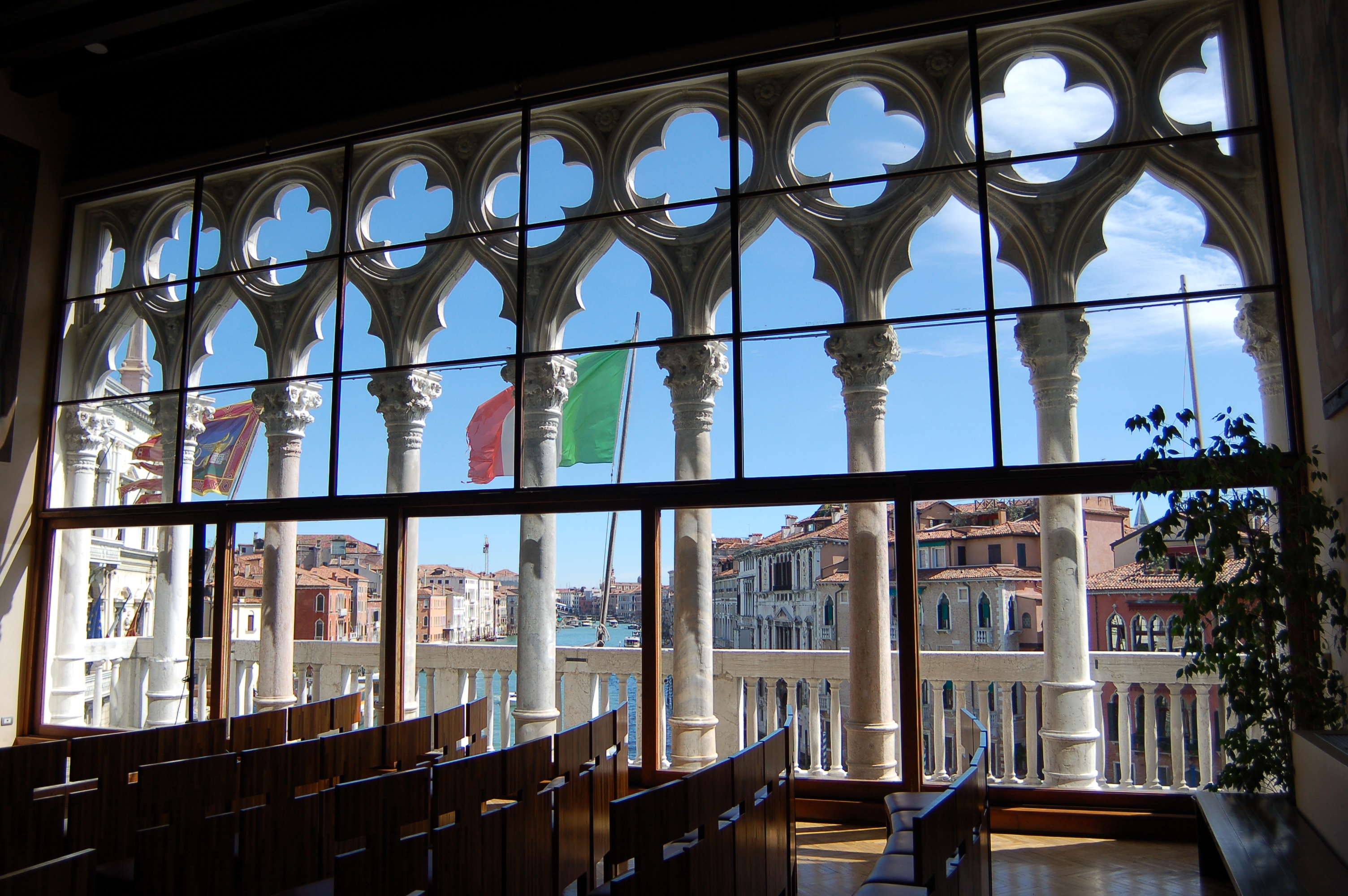
Ca' Foscari-Aula Baratto

The great hall dedicated to Mario Baratto (a professor of Italian literature and antifascist, who died in 1984) is situated on the second floor (the piano nobile) of the palace. The room is used today for conferences, conventions, formal ceremonies, advanced training courses and important events of Ca’ Foscari University. Scarpa designed the Great Hall in order to replace the Museum of Commerce. A massive portal with the Latin inscription ″STUDIA DECUS ORNAMENTUMQUE VITAE″ introduces the hall.

The most relevant features of the rooms are represented by:

- the interventions made by Carlo Scarpa (the window, the boiserie and the footboard);
- the two frescos painted by Mario Sironi e Mario De Luigi, which date back to 1936-1937;
- the view on the largest bend of the Grand Canal.

In 1979 a fire destroyed part of the room and consequently the architect Valeriano Pastor restored the room and the boiserie. After the fire the boiserie of Scarpa was in a very deteriorated state. Valeriano Pastor, student of Scarpa, restored it together with the same craftsman that worked with Scarpa in 1956.

Between 1935 and 1937 Mario Sironi was asked by the rector Agostino Lanzillo to decorate the Great Hall of Ca’ Foscari. He was chosen because he was considered an artist able to convey the faith and the fervor of the Italian Fascist youth of that period. The Italy, Venice and Studies fresco includes a student athlete holding a book and a musquet, the allegory of Technique, the allegory of Medicine, the city of Venice sitting on a throne, the lion of St. Mark and the domes of the basilica. It also shows a figure in chains called Motherland, which represents the victory of Italy in Ethiopia. There is an inscription over the Motherland figure: “Italy will do by itself”; it refers to the autarky pursued by Italy and to its ambition to become an imperial power. The second painting represents the school of philosophers. In the middle there is the thinker surrounded by his students. The painting presents traces of cubism, but there is also the three-dimensional element. The painting recalls Pablo Picasso's and Juan Gris's artistic style and Georges Braque's emphasis on colors.

In 2004 the room was restored once more, this time as part of the general restoration of the entire building. The craftsmen who had worked with Carlo Scarpa were called upon for the restoration of the boiserie and it was on this occasion that the chairs now present in the room were made.

=== Interventions by Carlo Scarpa ===
In 1936 Carlo Scarpa restored and remodeled various parts of the university, including the great hall.

In 1956 Scarpa was asked to return to Ca' Foscari to transform the great hall into a lecture hall, and on this occasion he created the boiserie elements. Before the intervention of the architect, the space now occupied by the great hall was used to house a museum of the Faculty of Economics.

Scarpa's project for the great hall included:

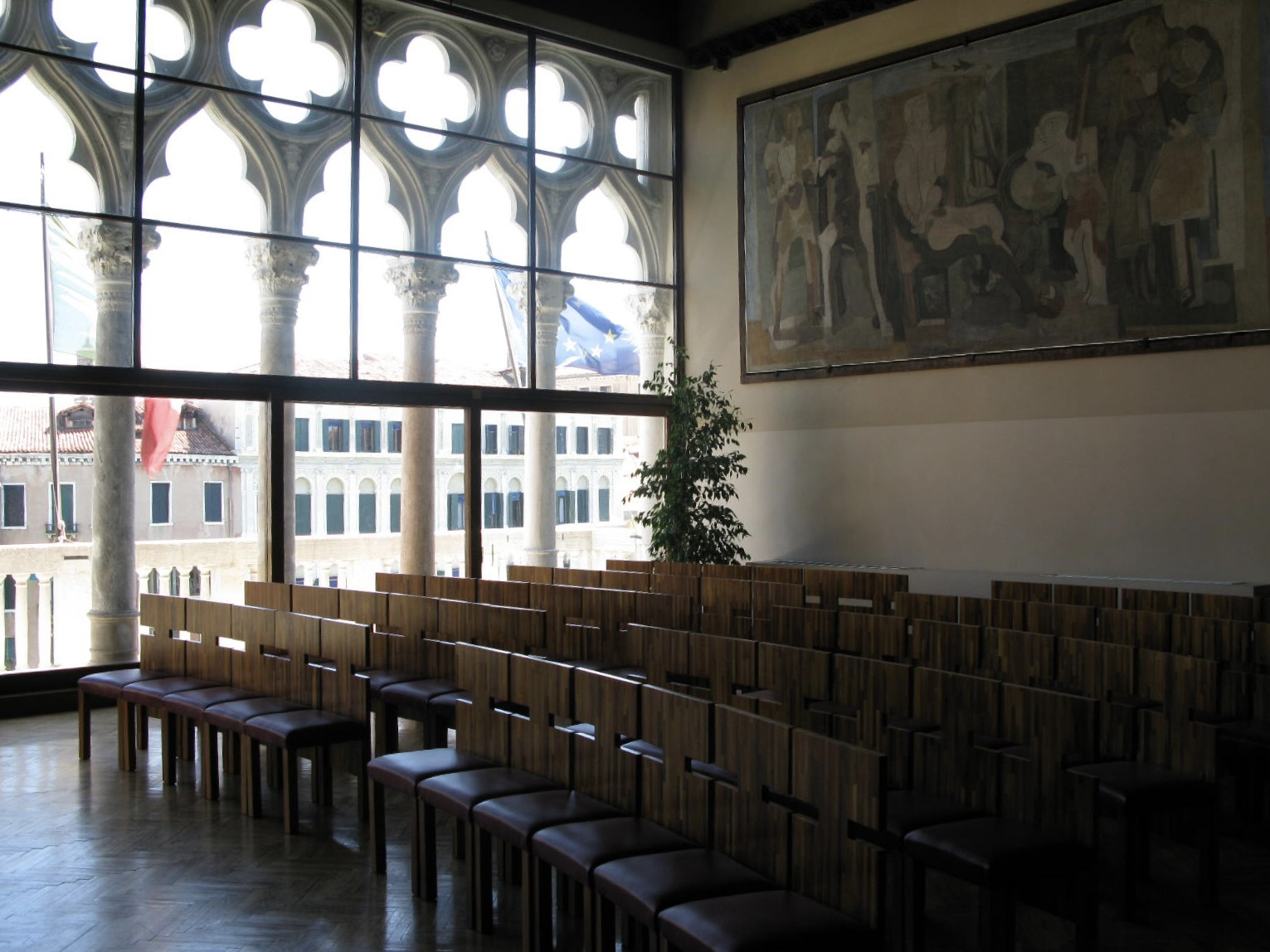
The Great hall Mario Baratto: a detail

- the window frame (made of glass and wood) in front of the 15th-century gothic window (polifora)
- the wooden platform with the slab of marble with a Latin inscription and the two pedestals
- the wooden tribune
- the marble portal with a Latin inscription

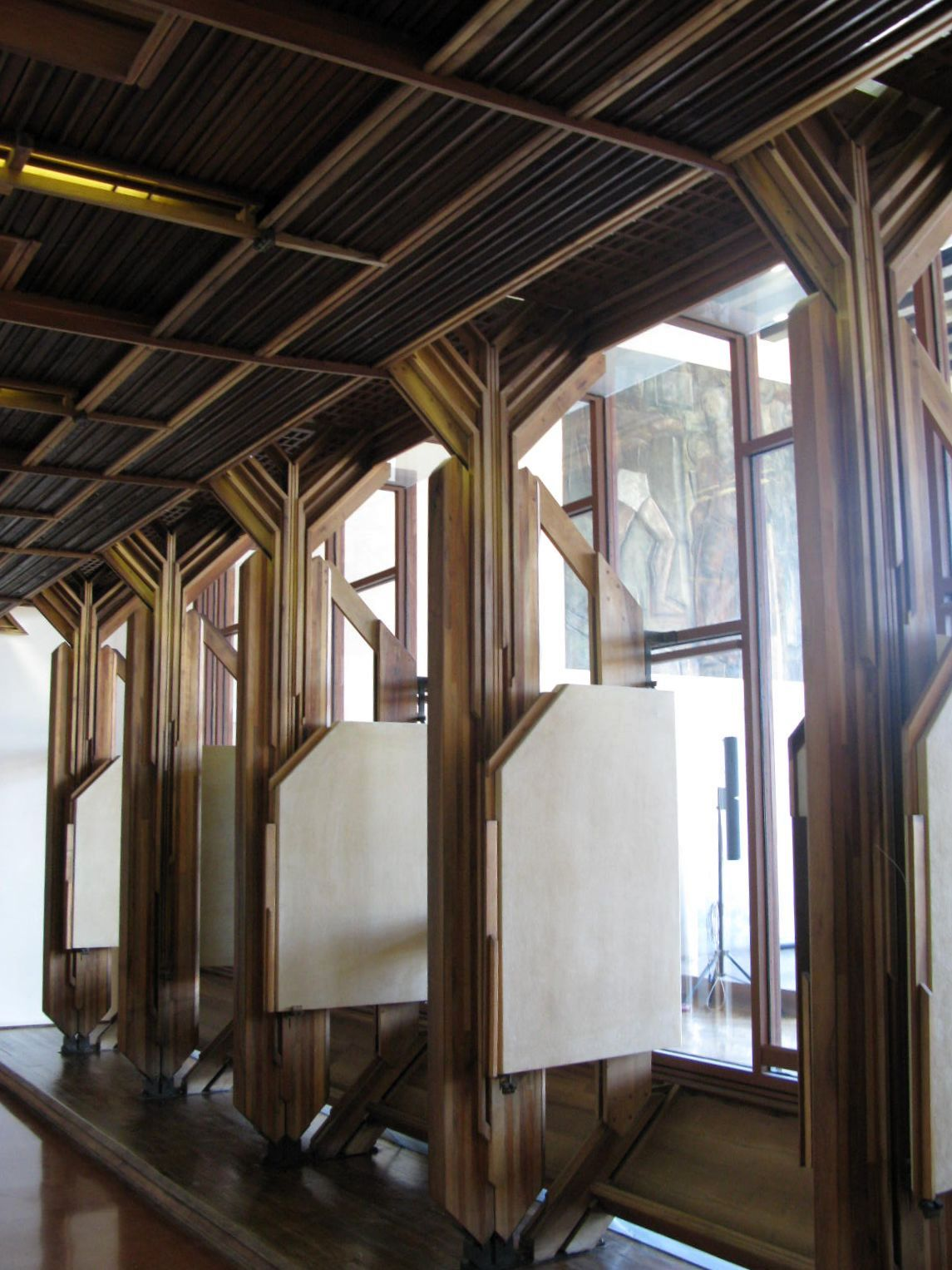
Ca' Foscari: boiserie designed by Carlo Scarpa

Scarpa removed the student tribune and designed the boiserie panelling, using part of the same wood employed for the student gallery. The boiserie is both a connection and a separation between the room and the corridor. Its sliding cloth-covered frames are used to conceal the room, and when they're closed they remind the ogive of the gothic window. The image of the gothic window is mirrored on the glass of the boiserie, with notable light effects.

=== Frescoes ===
==== Venezia, l'Italia e gli Studi, by Mario Sironi ====
Mario Sironi was commissioned to decorate the great hall Mario Baratto in 1936. The painting portrays a series of allegorical figures:

- the student athlete (emblem of the Fascist University Groups) holding a book and a musket;
- the winged lion emblem of the Republic of Venice;
- the domes of the St Mark's Basilica;
- the allegory of Technique (the woman leaning against a wheel);
- the allegory of Medicine (the woman with the caduceus);
- Venice (the woman on the throne holding a plate depicting Ca' Foscari);
- the Homeland (which represents the victory of Italy against Ethiopia).

==== La scuola, by Mario De Luigi ====
Mario De Luigi was a close friend of Carlo Scarpa; they both attended the Academy of Fine Arts of Venice and they worked together in the field of design and town planning; he was assistant of Arturo Martini at the Academy, then he started teaching scenography at University IUAV of Venice. De Luigi was asked to decorate a room on the first floor of Ca' Foscari palace; afterwards the painting was moved to the second floor, in the great hall Mario Baratto. The painting portrays a philosopher among his students.

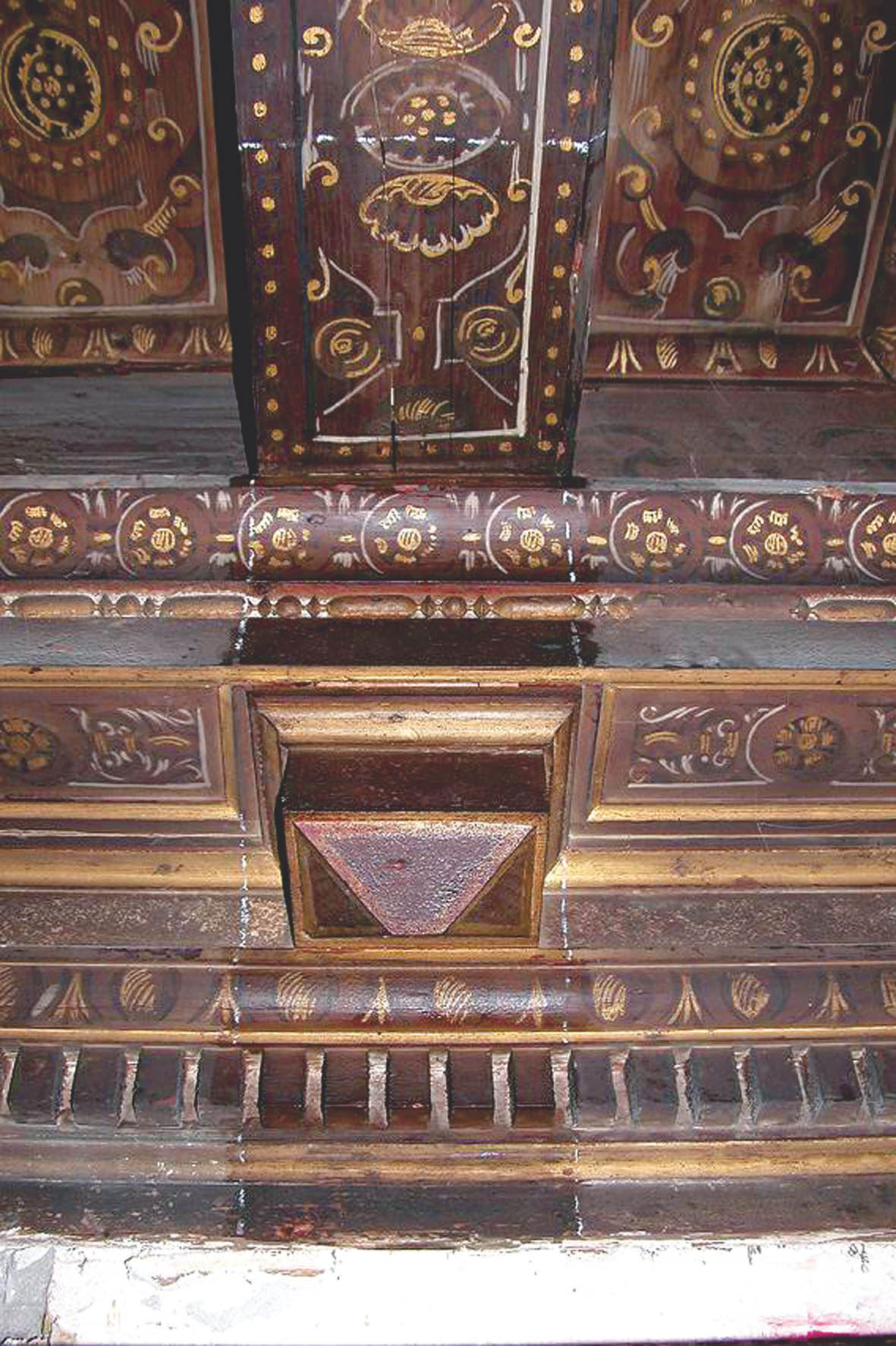
16th-century decorated ceiling in the palace

== See also ==
- University Ca' Foscari of Venice
- Francesco Foscari
- Carlo Scarpa
- Villa Foscari
- List of buildings and structures in Venice

== Sources ==
- Marcello Brusegan. La grande guida dei monumenti di Venezia. Rome, Newton & Compton, 2005. ISBN 88-541-0475-2.
- Guida d'Italia – Venezia. Milan, Touring Editore, 2007. ISBN 978-88-365-4347-2.
- Elsa e Wanda Eleodori. Il Canal Grande. Palazzi e Famiglie. Venice, Corbo e Fiore, 2007. ISBN 88-7086-057-4.
- Isnenghi, Mario; Stuart Woolf (2002). L'Ottocento e il Novecento. Rome: Istituto della enciclopedia italiana.
- Lorenzetti, Giulio (1994). Venezia e il suo estuario. Lint Editoriale Associati.
- Maurizio, Vittoria (1997). Breve storia di Venezia. Rome: Newton & Compton.
- Giuseppe Maria Pilo, ed. (2009). Ca' Foscari. Storia e restauro del palazzo dell'Università di Venezia. Venice: Marsilio.
- Elena Gobbo, Indagine chimico-fisica della superficie lapidea del portale di Ca' Foscari, Università Ca' Foscari, Venice, 2007

Preceded by Ca' d'Oro	Venice landmarks Ca' Foscari	Succeeded by Ca' Pesaro
