= Foscari =

Venetian noble family

Coat of arms of the Foscari family, incorporating Venice's Lion of Saint Mark

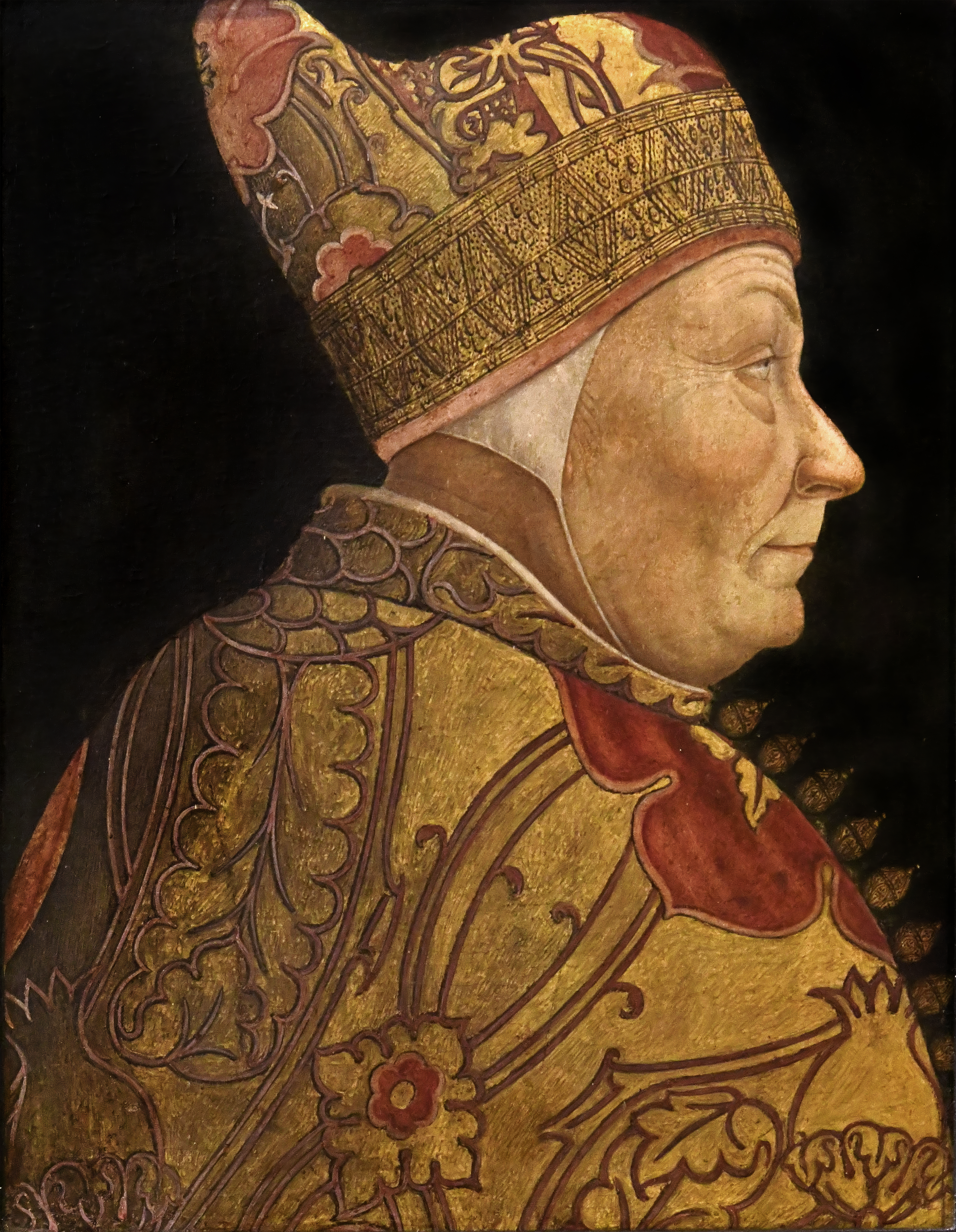
Francesco Foscari (1373–1457), Doge of Venice

The House of Foscari (Italian: [ˈfoskari]) was an ancient Venetian patrician family, which reached its peak in the 14th–15th centuries, culminating in the dogeship of Francesco Foscari (1423–1457).

== History ==
According to family tradition, they originated from the area of Mestre, and had settled in Venice proper in the late 10th century, and the first members of the family are attested in written sources in the early 11th century. The Foscari were not very important during the subsequent centuries, but in the 13th century, after the Fourth Crusade, they became rulers of the Greek island of Lemnos, along with the Navagero family, until 1276.

The family's real rise to prominence began in the early 14th century, when they managed to be included among the c. 150 patrician families that held the hereditary right to be members of the Great Council of Venice following the so-called "Serrata" ("Closing"). As membership in the Great Council was a prerequisite for holding any of the senior offices of the Republic of Venice, this meant that henceforth the upper nobility monopolized control of the state. The first important member of the family was Niccolò, who owned much property both in Venice and in the hinterland (terraferma). His contacts with the princes of northern Italy led to him being knighted by Cangrande I della Scala, Lord of Verona, in 1328, while three years later, he was enfeoffed over his estates at Zellarino, Noventa, and San Bruson and given the hereditary title of count by John of Luxemburg. Niccolò married three times and had two sons, Giovanni and Jacobello, and two daughters, Agnesina and Maria.

Giovanni enjoyed a long and somewhat successful career in public office, serving as military commander, city governor (podesta), and ambassador. He had at least six sons, of whom the most prominent were Paolo, who became a priest and eventually rose to become Latin Archbishop of Patras, Niccolò the younger, and Franzi Foscari. Until his death in 1412, Niccolò served in a succession of political offices, including governor of Corfu and Verona, ducal councillor, and finally a member of the powerful Council of Ten. The eldest of his six children was the future doge Francesco Foscari. Franzi Foscari also followed a distinguished career until his death in 1424/25, and his son Polidoro Foscari rose to become Archbishop of Zara.

The family reached its apogee under Francesco Foscari, Doge of Venice from 1423 to 1457, when he was forced to abdicate by the Council of Ten. Francesco Foscari's dogeship was marked by Venice's expansion in the terraferma and its wars with the Duchy of Milan, but also by the increasingly autocratic rule of the Doge, and the trials and exile of his son Jacopo Foscari for bribery and corruption. Jacopo's misdeeds, actual and alleged, provided a means for the Doge's political opponents to attack him, and played a major role in Francesco's own downfall. The tragic spectacle of a father, acting as head of state, forced to send his only surviving son into exile, provided much inspiration for artists, such as Lord Byron's The Two Foscari, on which Giuseppe Verdi based his opera I due Foscari. The family continued after that, but never recovered its former prominence.

In 1558, brothers Nicolo and Luigi Foscari commissioned a new villa beside the Brenta canal on the terraferma, the main land near Venice, with architect Andrea Palladio. It was completed in 1560 and is one of the most splendid examples of Palladianism. The villa was sold by the family in 1926, but re-purchased in 1973 and restored to its old glory. It houses a museum.

In the 19th century count Piero Foscari married the Austrian countess Elisabeth Widmann-Rezzonico, heiress of the lordship of Paternion in Carinthia, Austria. Paternion Castle, together with castles Pöllan and Kreuzen and 8,800 hectares of forest, are still today owned by the Austrian branch, the counts Foscari-Widmann-Rezzonico.

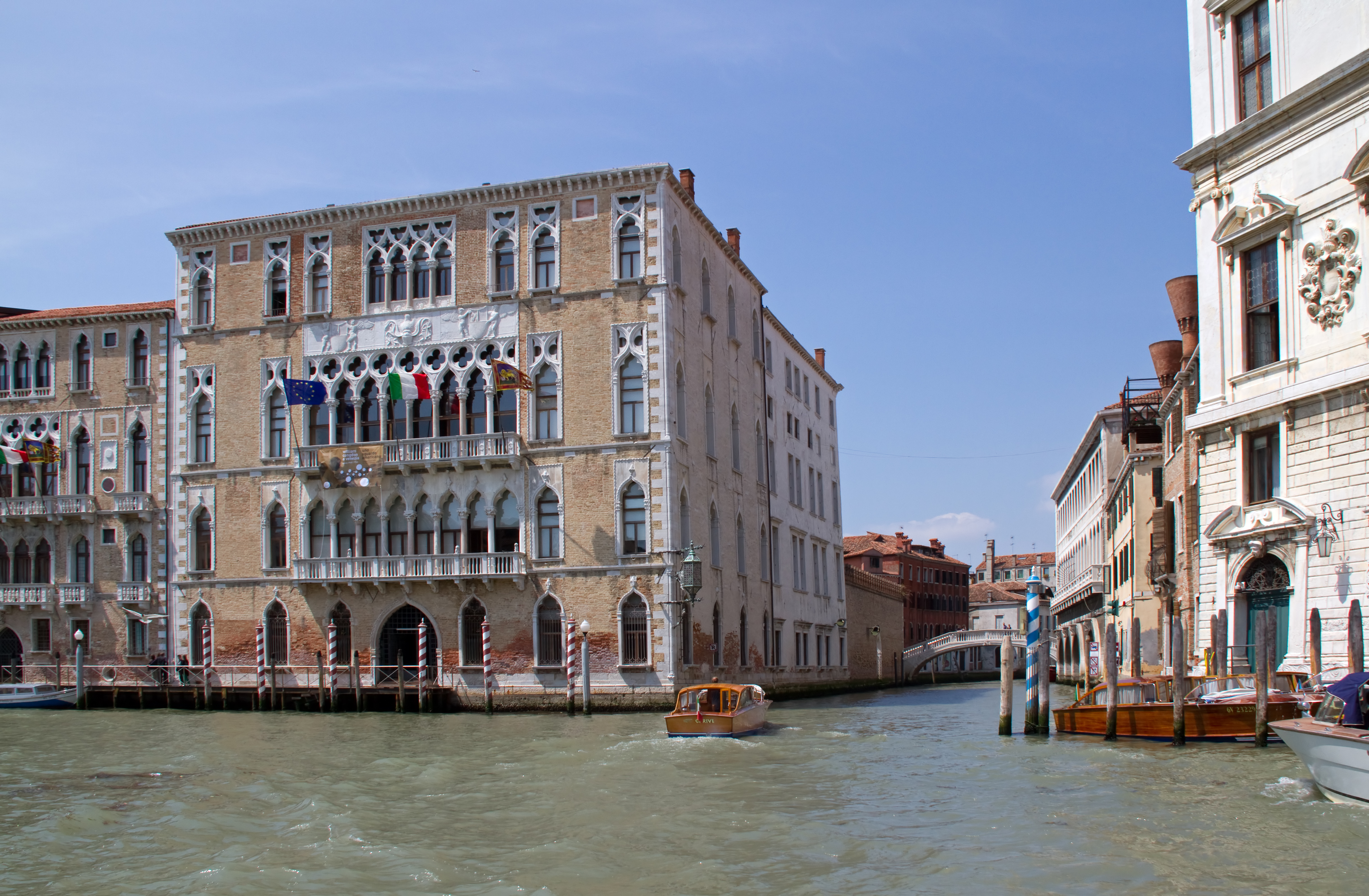
Ca' Foscari

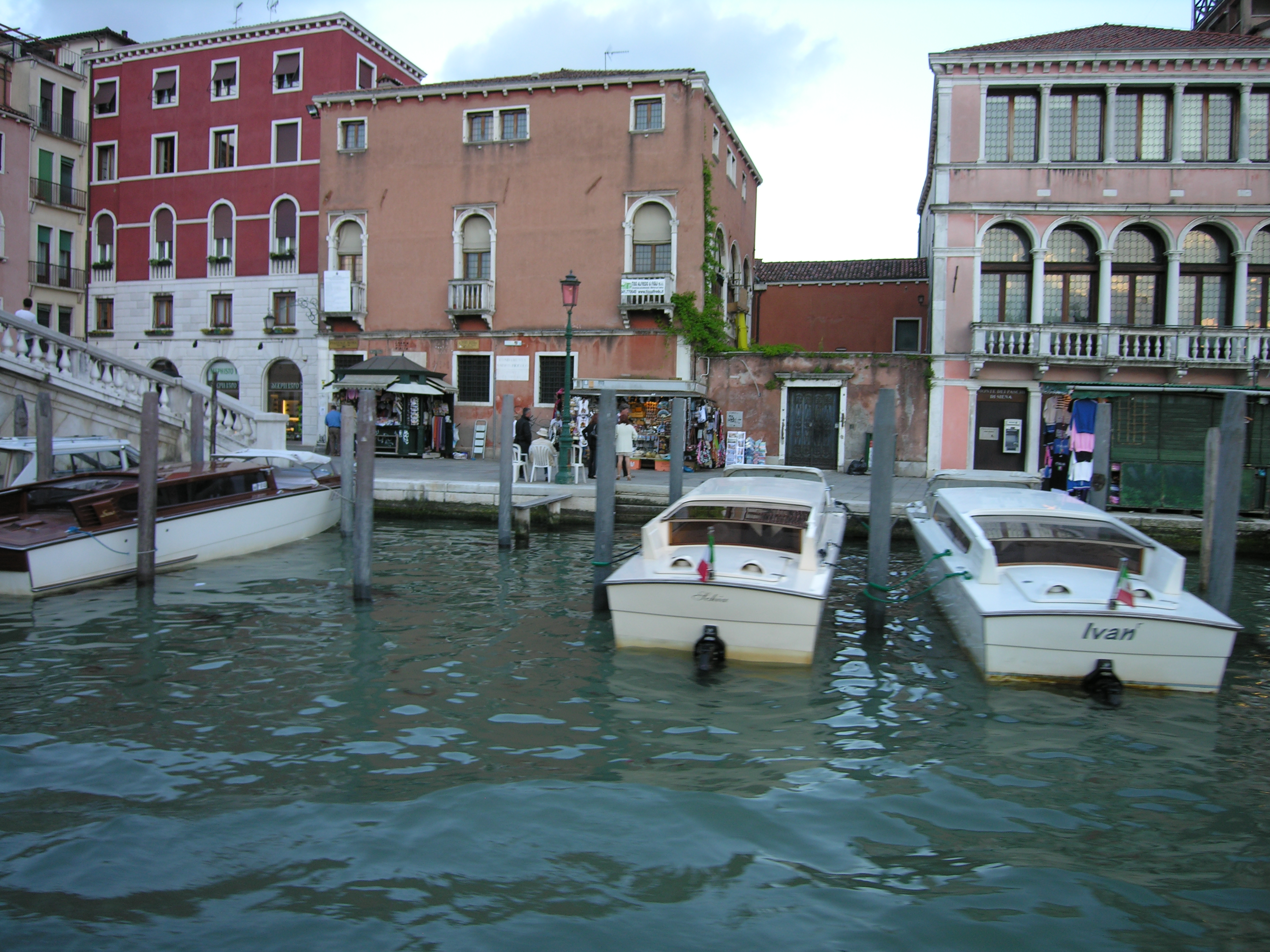
Palazzo Foscari Contarini

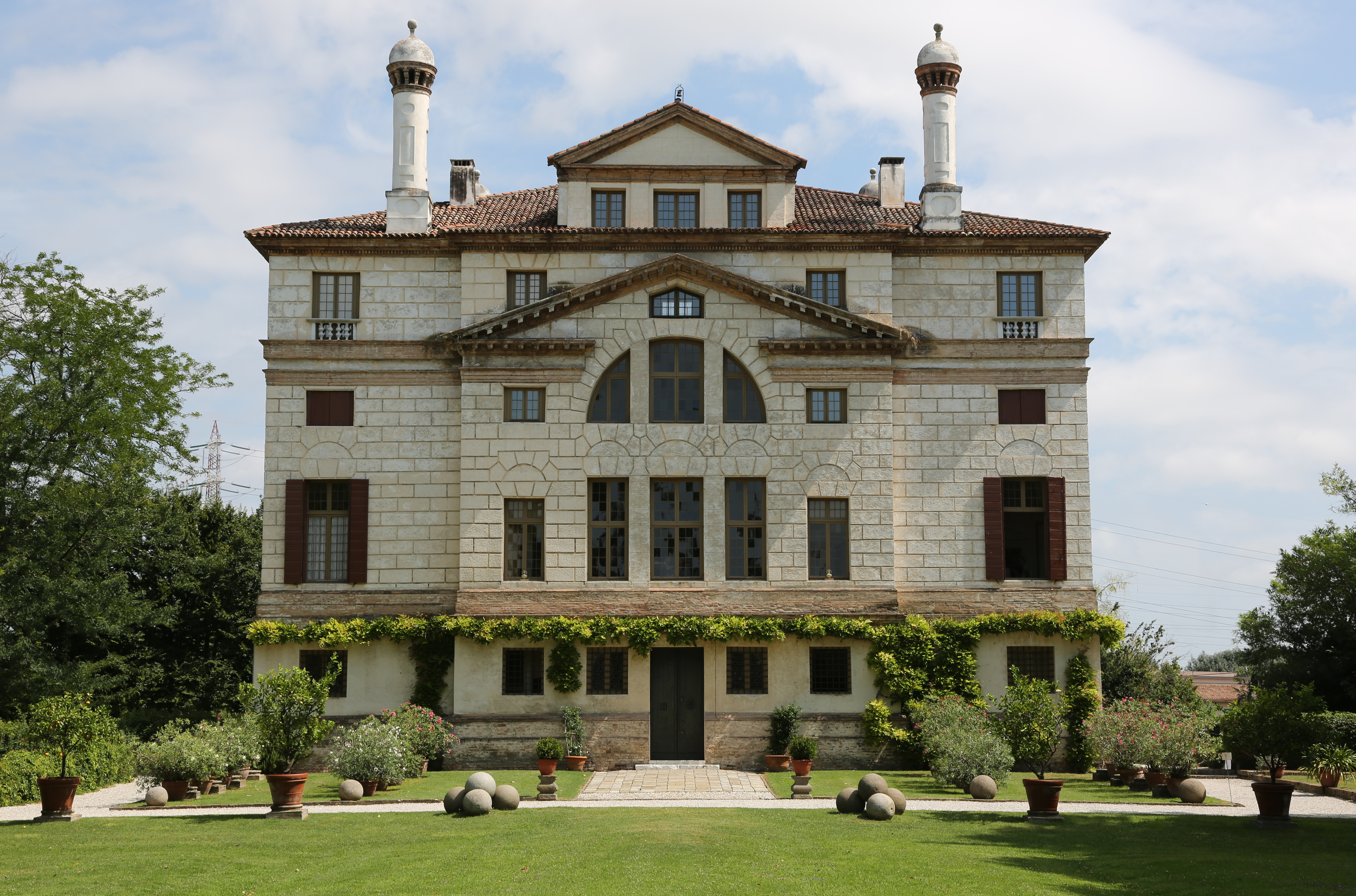
Villa Foscari

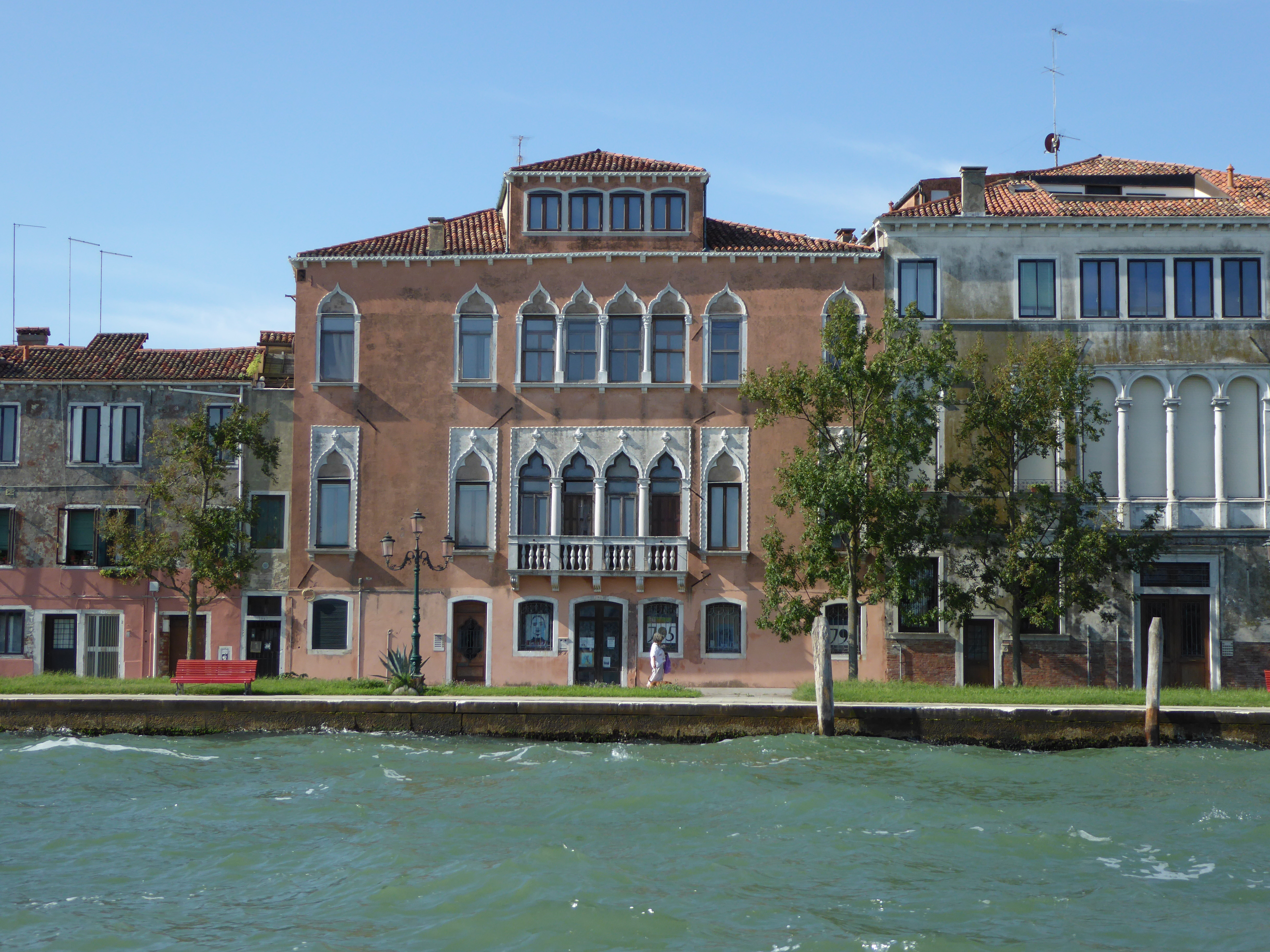
Palazzo Foscari (Giudecca 795)

== Sources ==
- Cessi, Roberto (1932). "FOSCARI". Enciclopedia Italiana (in Italian).
- Gullino, Giuseppe (1997). "FOSCARI, Francesco". Dizionario Biografico degli Italiani, Volume 49: Forino–Francesco da Serino (in Italian). Rome: Istituto dell'Enciclopedia Italiana. ISBN 978-88-12-00032-6.
- Ravegnani, Giorgio (1997). "FOSCARI, Giovanni". Dizionario Biografico degli Italiani, Volume 49: Forino–Francesco da Serino (in Italian). Rome: Istituto dell'Enciclopedia Italiana. ISBN 978-88-12-00032-6.
- Ravegnani, Giorgio (1997). "FOSCARI, Paolo". Dizionario Biografico degli Italiani, Volume 49: Forino–Francesco da Serino (in Italian). Rome: Istituto dell'Enciclopedia Italiana. ISBN 978-88-12-00032-6.
- Romano, Dennis (2007). The Likeness of Venice: A Life of Doge Francesco Foscari. Yale University Press. ISBN 978-0-300-11202-3.
