= Peruque Creek =

Stream in the American state of Missouri

Location
- Country: United States
- State: Missouri
- Region: St. Charles and Warren counties

Physical characteristics
- Source
  - coordinates: 38°48′22″N 91°04′37″W
  - elevation: 825 ft (251 m)
- Mouth
  - coordinates: 38°53′46″N 90°38′47″W
  - elevation: 420 ft (130 m)

Peruque Creek is a stream in St. Charles and Warren Counties in the U.S. state of Missouri. It is a tributary of the Mississippi River.

The stream headwaters arise three miles east of Warrenton. The stream flows east and northeast passing just south of Wright City and enters St. Charles County just southwest of Foristell. The stream flow south of and parallel to Interstate 70 past Wentzville. The stream crosses under US Route 61 and enters the waters of Lake St. Louis. Below the dam the stream flows north passing under Interstate 70 then turns east flowing north of O'Fallon. The stream turns to the northeast and passes under Missouri Route 79 to continue southeast of the old community of Firma to its confluence with the Mississippi northwest of the village of Peruque.

Peruque is a name given by French settlers; several traditions attempt to explain the meaning.

During the Civil War the Union Army built a log fort to protect the railroad bridge over the Peruque. The crossing is located just north of the current Lake St. Louis dam.

Alternate names include: Trains Creek, Barrock Creek, Bear Creek, Perruque Creek, and Perruque River.

== See also ==
- List of rivers of Missouri
