= Firma =

Firma may refer to:

- Firma, Missouri, a ghost town in the United States
- Firma (supporter group), a Serbian football fan club
- Firma, a monthly magazine supplement to the Globes (newspaper) newspaper
- Firma (TV series), a 2005 Finnish TV series
- Firma (hip hop group), a Polish hip hop group

== See also ==
- Die Firma, a German hip hop group
- Terra firma (disambiguation)
