= Piano nobile =

Main floor of a palace

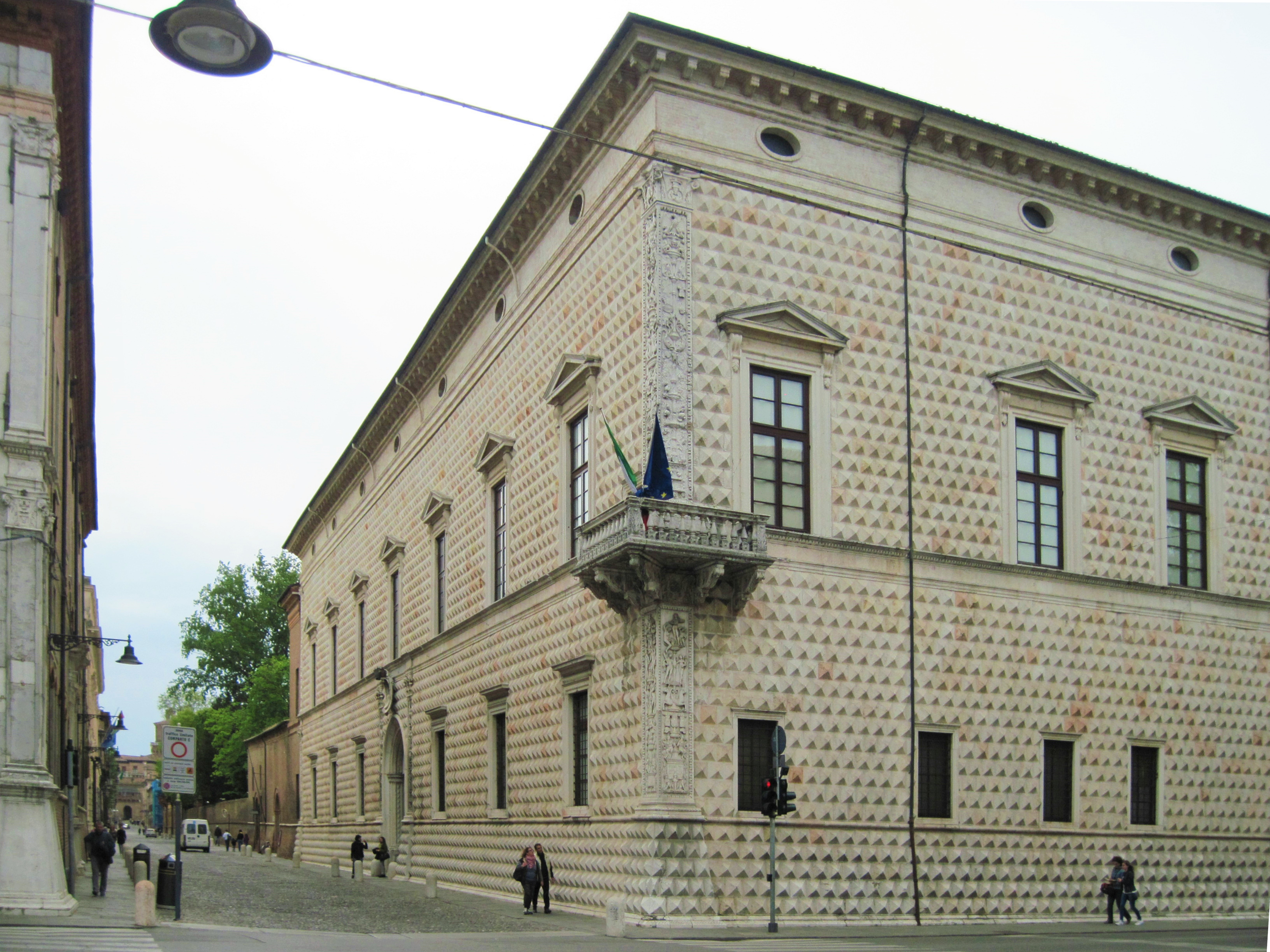
An early-15th-century piano nobile at the Palazzo dei Diamanti, Ferrara. Its larger windows indicate its superior status compared with the rooms on the floor below.

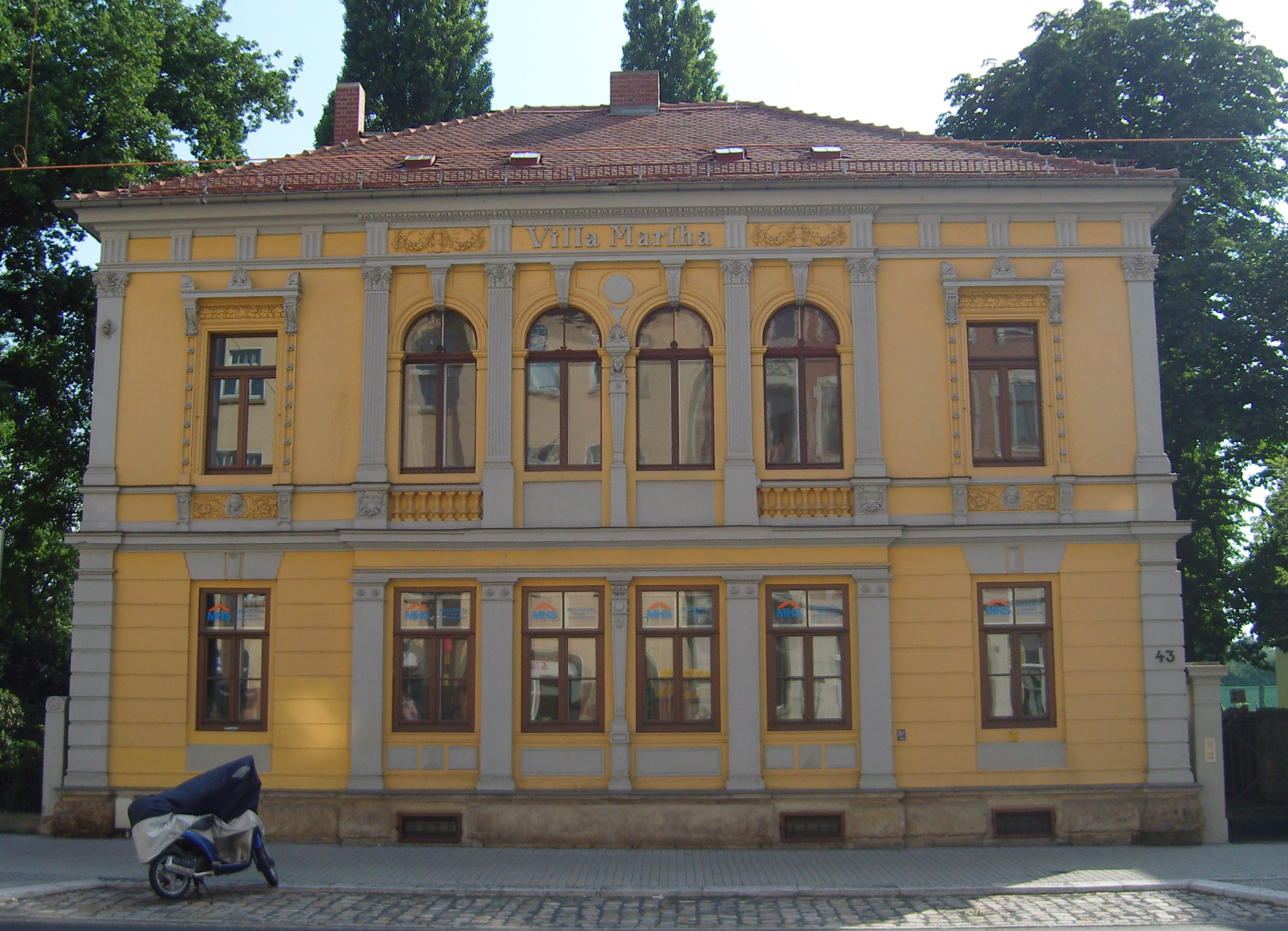
The Beletage of Dresden's Villa Martha, built in the 1870s

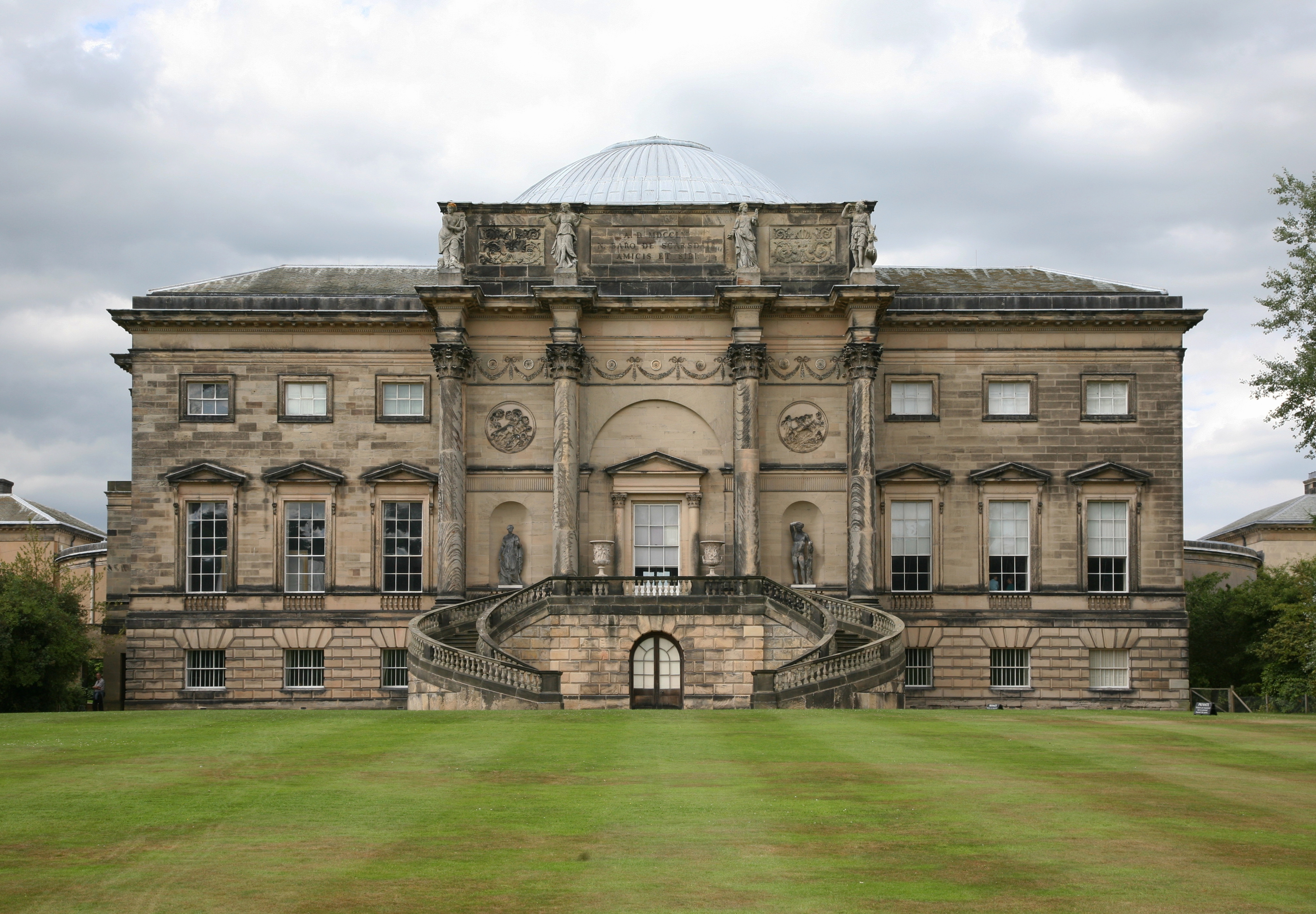
At the 18th-century Kedleston Hall in Derbyshire, the piano nobile is placed above a rusticated ground floor, and reached by an external staircase. The uppermost windows indicate that the upper floor is of far lower status.

Piano nobile (Italian for "noble floor" or "noble level", also sometimes referred to by the corresponding French term, bel étage 'beautiful storey') is the architectural term for the principal floor of a palazzo. This floor contains the main reception and bedrooms of the house.

The German term is Beletage (from the French). Both date to the 17th century.

== Characteristics ==
The piano nobile is usually the first floor (in European terminology; second floor in American terms) or sometimes the second storey and contains major rooms, located above the rusticated ground floor containing the minor rooms and service rooms. The reasons were so that the rooms above the ground floor would have finer views and to avoid the dampness and odours of the street level. That is especially true in Venice, where the piano nobile of the many palazzi is especially obvious from the exterior by virtue of its larger windows and balconies and open loggias. Examples are Ca' Foscari, Ca' d'Oro, Ca' Vendramin Calergi and Palazzo Barbarigo.

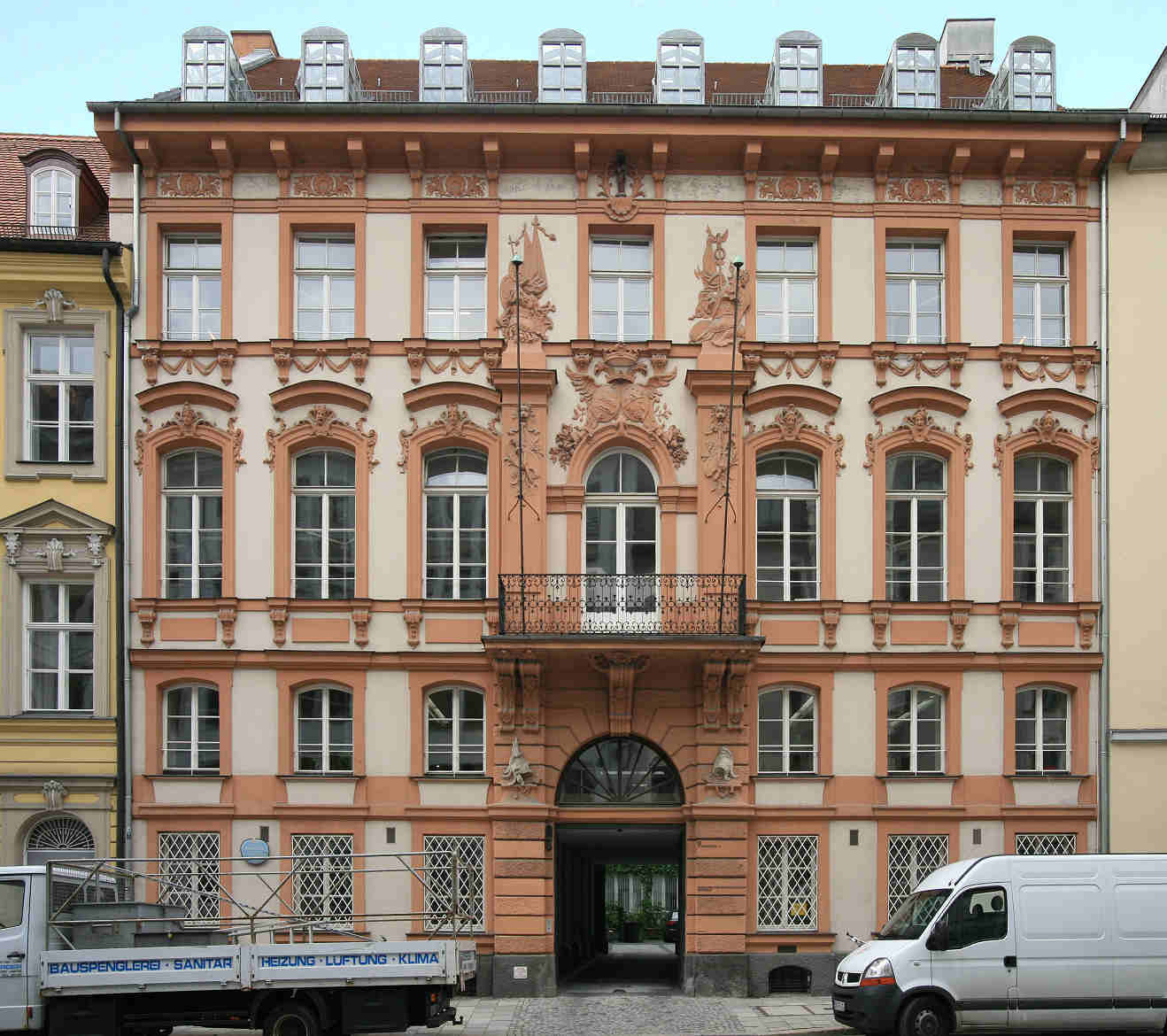
The Beletage of the Palais Gise in Munich is on the second floor (third floor in American terms).

Larger windows than those on other floors are usually the most obvious feature of the piano nobile. In England and Italy, the piano nobile is often reached by an ornate outer staircase, which permitted the floor's inhabitants to enter the house avoiding the servant's floor below. Kedleston Hall is an example of this in England, as is Villa Capra "La Rotonda" in Italy.

Most houses contained a secondary floor above the piano nobile, which contained more intimate withdrawing and bedrooms for private use by the family of the house when no honoured guests were present. Above that floor would often be an attic floor containing staff bedrooms.

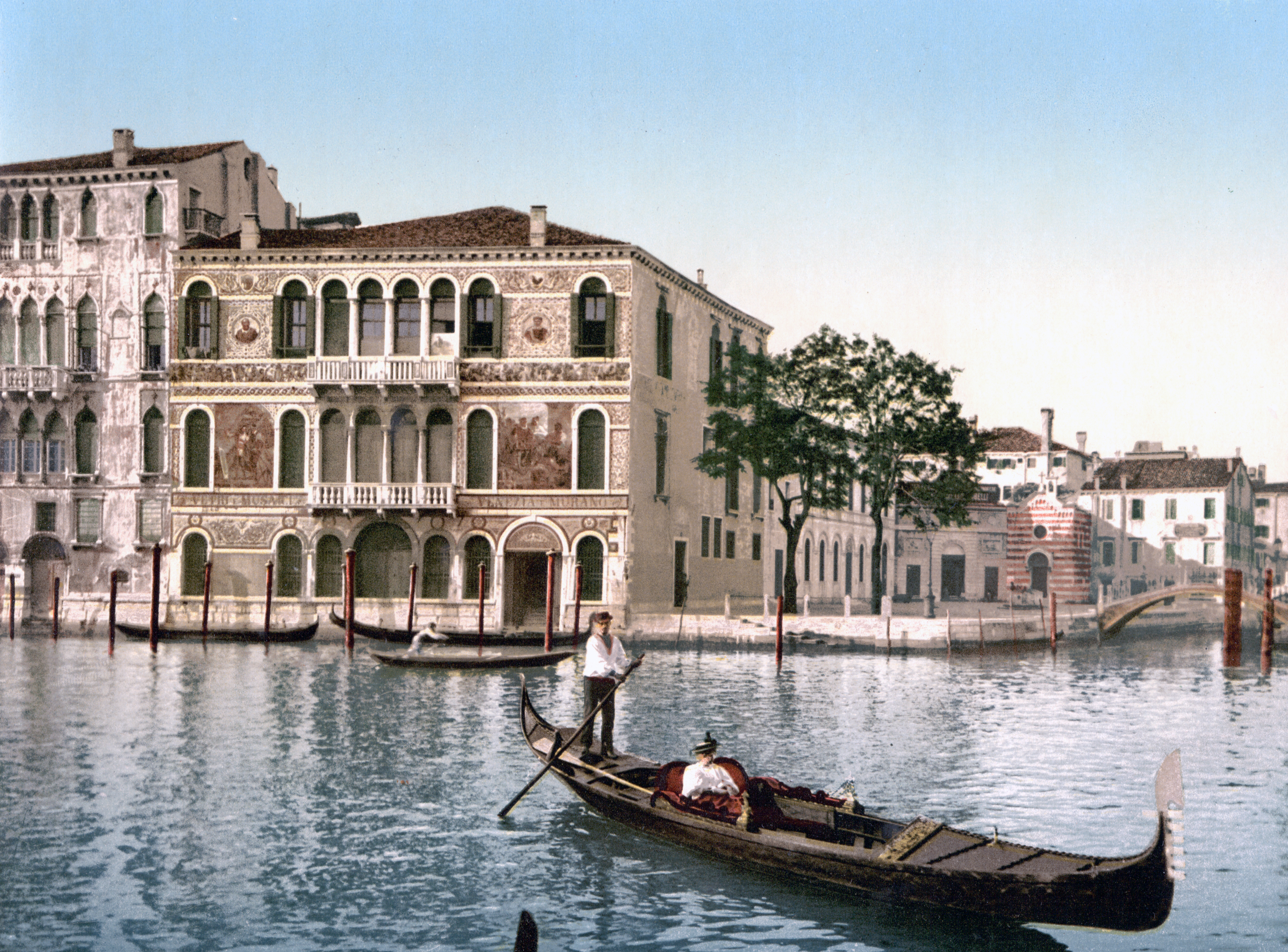
At the Palazzo Barbarigo in Venice, the floor above the piano nobile is of almost equal status, so it is referred to as the secondo piano nobile.

In Italy, especially in Venetian palazzi, the floor above the piano nobile is sometimes referred to as the "secondo piano nobile" (second principal floor), especially if the loggias and balconies reflect those below on a slightly smaller scale. In those instances and occasionally in museums, the principal piano nobile is described as the primo piano nobile to differentiate it.

The arrangement of floors continued throughout Europe as large houses continued to be built in the classical style. The arrangement was designed at Buckingham Palace as recently as the mid-19th century. Holkham Hall, Osterley Park and Chiswick House are among the innumerable 18th-century English houses that employed the design.

== Bibliography ==
- Chiarini, Marco (2001). Pitti Palace. Livorno: Sillabe s.r.l. ISBN 88-8347-047-8.
- Chierici, Gino (1964). Il Palazzo Italiano. Milan.
- Copplestone, Trewin (1963). World Architecture. Hamlyn.
- Dynes, Wayne (1968). Palaces of Europe. London: Hamlyn.
- Dal Lago, Adalbert (1966). Ville Antiche. Milan: Fratelli Fabbri.
- Girouard, Mark (1978). Life in the English Country House. Yale University Press. ISBN 0-300-02273-5.
- Halliday, E. E. (1967). Cultural History of England. London: Thames and Hudson.
- Harris, John; de Bellaigue, Geoffrey; & Miller, Oliver (1968). Buckingham Palace.
- Hussey, Christopher (1955). English Country Houses: Early Georgian 1715–1760 London, Country Life.
- Jackson-Stops, Gervase (1990). The Country House in Perspective. Pavilion Books Ltd.
- Kaminski Marion, Art and Architecture of Venice, 1999, Könemann, ISBN 3-8290-2657-9
- Masson, Georgina (1959). Italian Villas and Palaces. London: Harry N. Abrams ltd.London:Nelson. ISBN 0-17-141011-4
