= Francesco Foscari =

Doge of Venice from 1423 to 1457

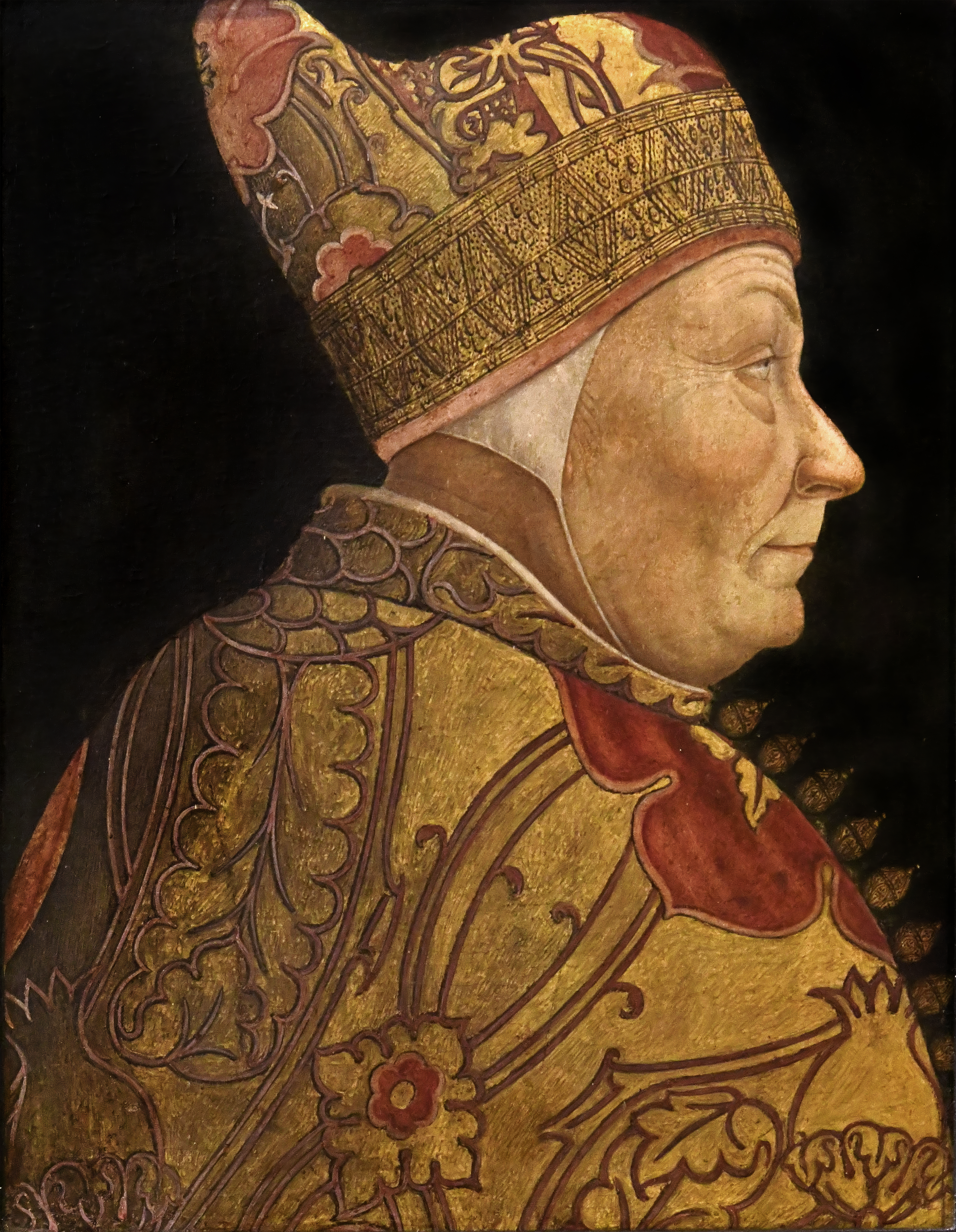
- Portrait by Lazzaro Bastiani, Museo Correr, Venice.

Doge of Venice
- Reign: 15 April 1423 – 22 October 1457
- Predecessor: Tommaso Mocenigo
- Successor: Pasquale Malipiero
- Born: 19 June 1373; Venice, Venetian Republic
- Died: 1 November 1457 (aged 84); Santa Margherita, Venice, Venetian Republic
- Burial: Santa Maria Gloriosa dei Frari, Venice
- House: Foscari

Francesco Foscari (19 June 1373 – 1 November 1457) was the 65th Doge of the Republic of Venice, serving from 1423 until his death in 1457. His reign of 34 years, 6 months, and 8 days was the longest in Venetian history. His tenure coincided with the early stages of the Italian Renaissance, a period during which Venice increased its prominence in art, humanism, and diplomacy.

Foscari's dogeship marked a critical phase in the territorial expansion of Venice onto the Italian mainland—known as the Domini di Terraferma—through prolonged wars with Milan during the Wars in Lombardy.

== Biography ==
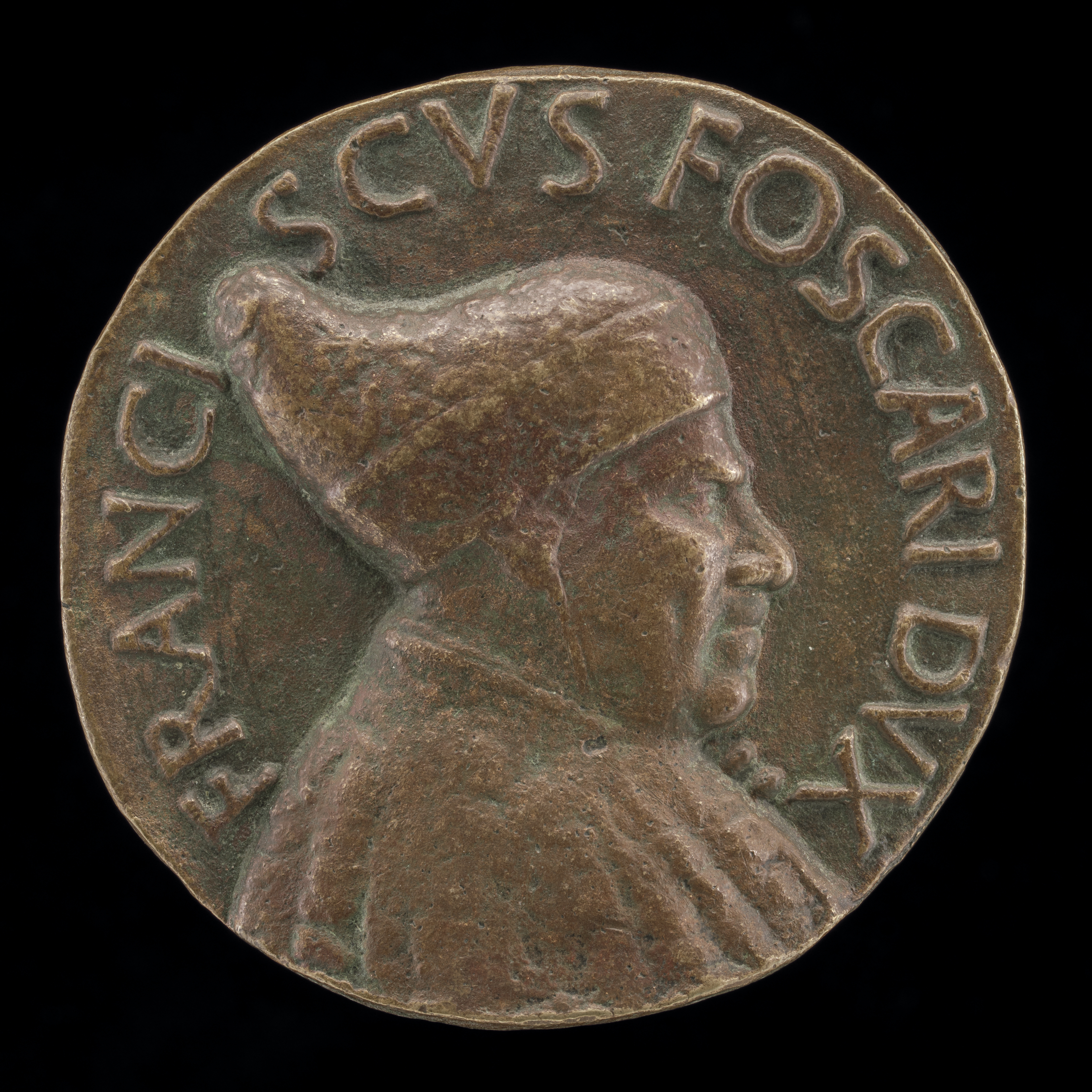
Antonio Gambello, Francesco Foscari, c. 1374–1457, Doge of Venice 1423 (obverse), probably c. 1457

Coat of arms of Francesco Foscari.

Francesco Foscari was born in 1373, as the oldest son of Nicolò Foscari and his wife Cateruzia Michiel. The Foscari family had been of only moderate importance, but had managed to become one of the few noble families that secured a hereditary place in the Great Council of Venice after the so-called Serrata ("Closing") of the Great Council, and had begun to rise in prominence throughout the 14th century. Francesco's ancestors began holding high public office, and his father Nicolò even became a member of the powerful Council of Ten.

Francesco served the Republic of Venice in numerous official capacities—as ambassador, president of the Council of Forty, member of the Council of Ten, inquisitor, Procurator of St Mark's, avogador de comùn—before he was elected in 1423 defeating the other candidate, Pietro Loredan. His task as doge was to lead Venice in a long and protracted series of wars against Milan, governed by the Visconti, who were attempting to dominate all of northern Italy. Despite the justification of Venetian embroilment in the terraferma that was offered in Foscari's funeral oration, delivered by the humanist senator and historian Bernardo Giustiniani, and some victories, the war was extremely costly to Venice, whose real source of wealth and power was at sea. Venice, which during Foscari's leadership abandoned her ally Florence, was eventually overcome by the forces of Milan under the leadership of Francesco Sforza. Sforza soon made peace with Florence, however, leaving Venice alone.

Foscari was married twice: first to Maria Priuli, and then in 1415 to Marina Nani. In 1445, his only surviving son, Jacopo, was tried by the Council of Ten on charges of bribery and corruption and exiled from the city. Two further trials, in 1450 and 1456 – during the latter he confessed, without even the need of torture, to having pleaded for help from the Ottoman Sultan Mehmed II and the aforementioned Duke of Milan, both Venice's enemies – led to Jacopo's imprisonment on Crete and his eventual death there soon after.

News of Jacopo's death caused Foscari to withdraw from his government duties, and in October 1457 the Council of Ten forced him to abdicate. However, his death a week later provoked such public outcry that he was given a state funeral.

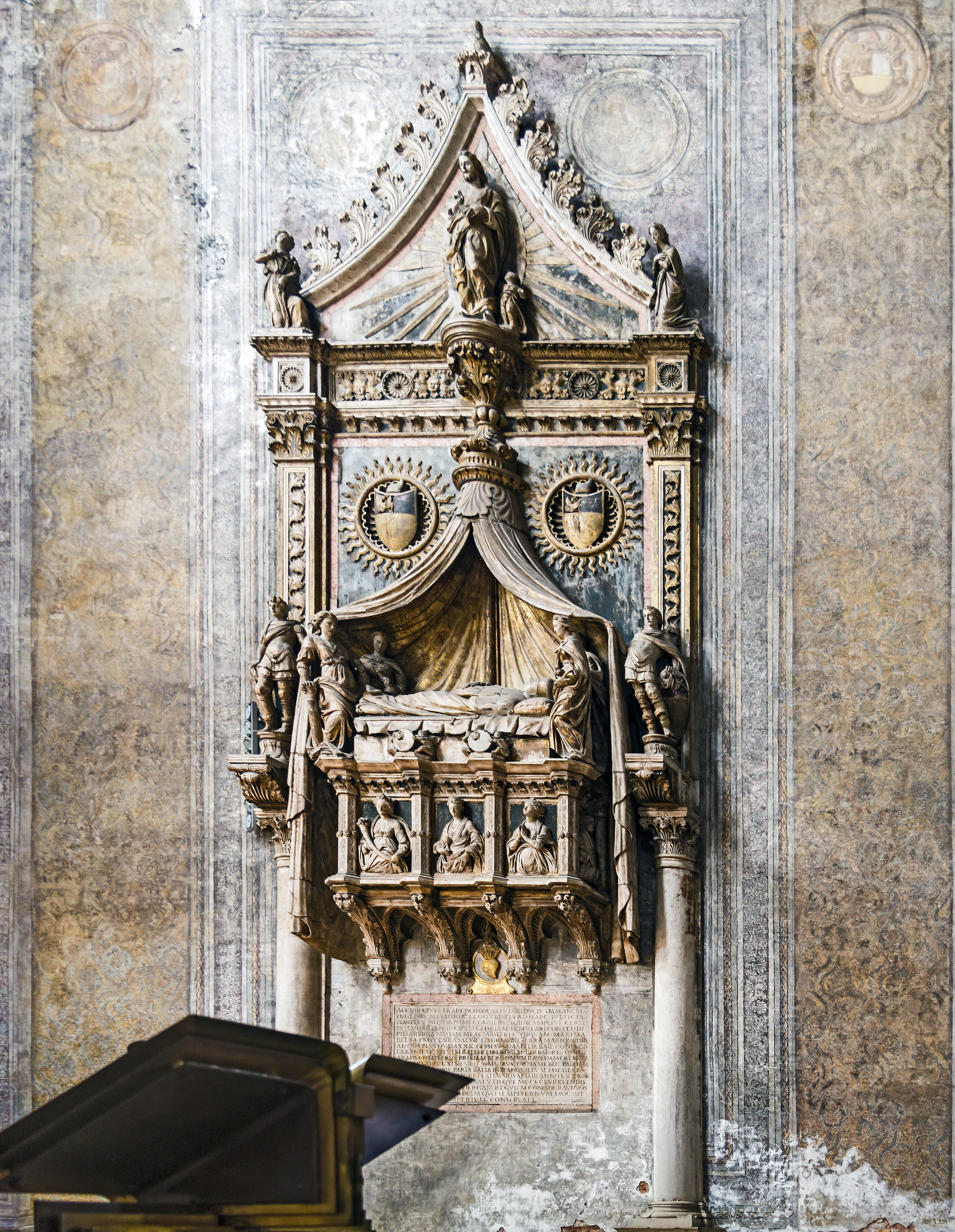
The tomb of Foscari in Frari, Venice

Beside his profile portrait by Lazzaro Bastiani, Foscari commissioned a bas-relief bronze plaquette from Donatello, which survives in several examples. His figure kneeling in prayer to St Mark figured over the portal to the Doge's Palace until it was dismantled by order of the revolutionary government, 1797; the head was preserved and is conserved in the Museo dell'Opera di Palazzo Ducale. His monument by the sculptor Antonio Bregno in collaboration with his architect brother Paolo was erected in the church of Santa Maria dei Frari in Venice.

He was deposed from office on 27 October 1457 and died five days after.

== In literature and opera ==
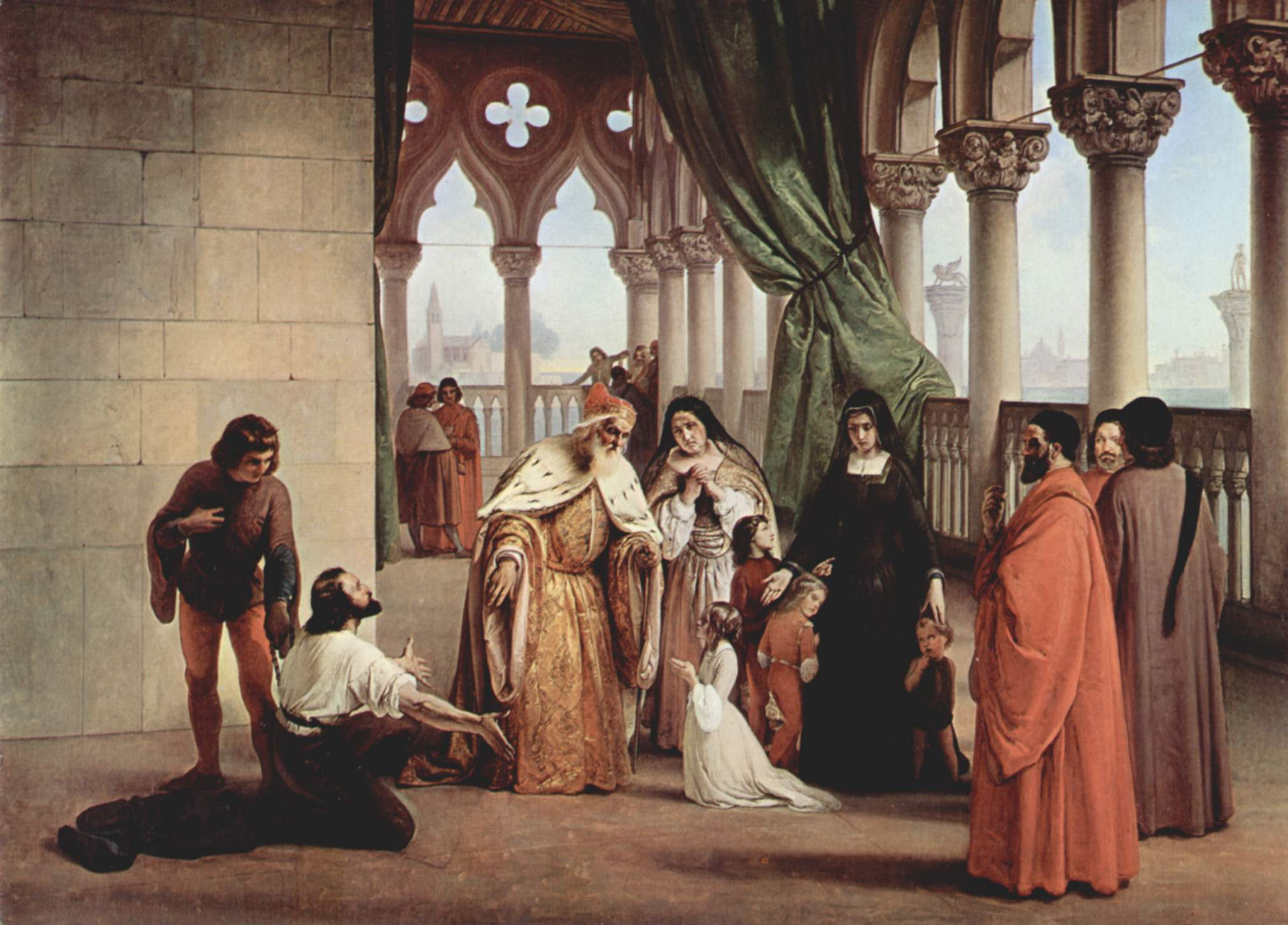
The Parting of the Two Foscari by Francesco Hayez 1842 (Galleria d'Arte Moderna, Florence).

Foscari's life was the subject of a play The Two Foscari by Lord Byron (1821) and an episode in Samuel Rogers' long poem Italy. The Byron play served as the basis for the libretto written by Francesco Maria Piave for Giuseppe Verdi's opera I due Foscari, which premiered on 3 November 1844 in Rome. Mary Mitford, author of the popular literary sketches of the English countryside entitled Our Village, also wrote a successful play concerned with events in Foscari's life. Mitford's play Foscari debuted at Covent Garden in 1826 with famed actor Charles Kemble in the lead.

== See also ==
- Ca' Foscari, built by Francesco Foscari on the Grand Canal.

== Sources ==
- Romano, Dennis (2007). The Likeness of Venice: A Life of Doge Francesco Foscari. Yale University Press. ISBN 978-0-300-11202-3.
- Villari, Luigi (1911). "Foscari, Francesco" . In Chisholm, Hugh (ed.). Encyclopædia Britannica. Vol. 10 (11th ed.). Cambridge University Press. p. 730.

Political offices
Preceded by Tommaso Mocenigo	Doge of Venice; 1423–1457	Succeeded by Pasquale Malipiero
