= Tierra Firme =

Tierra Firme may refer to:

- Province of Tierra Firme, 16th century Spanish colony
- Tierra Firme (album), a 2011 album by Puerto Rican singer-songwriter Luis Fonsi
- Tierra Firme F.C., a Panamanian football team
- Santa Fe de Tierra Firme, a fictional country of Hispanic America in:
  - Ramón María del Valle-Inclán's 1926 novel Tirano Banderas
  - its 1993 film adaptation Banderas, the Tyrant

== See also ==
- Terra firma (disambiguation)
