= Peruque, Missouri =

Unincorporated community in Missouri, U.S.

Coordinates: 38°52′06″N 90°36′29″W

Peruque (/pəˈruːk/) is an unincorporated community in St. Charles County, in the U.S. state of Missouri. The community is adjacent to the Mississippi River, approximately five miles north of St. Peters on Missouri Route C. McCann Landing is just to the southeast along the river.

== History ==
A post office was established in 1888, and remained in operation until 1979. The community takes its name from Peruque Creek.

It was also known as Peruque Station as it was on the St. Louis, Keokuk and North Western Railway.

== Notable person ==
- Ken Heintzelman (1915–2000), Major League Baseball pitcher who played for both Pennsylvania MLB teams was born here.
