= Ken Heintzelman =

American baseball player (1915–2000)

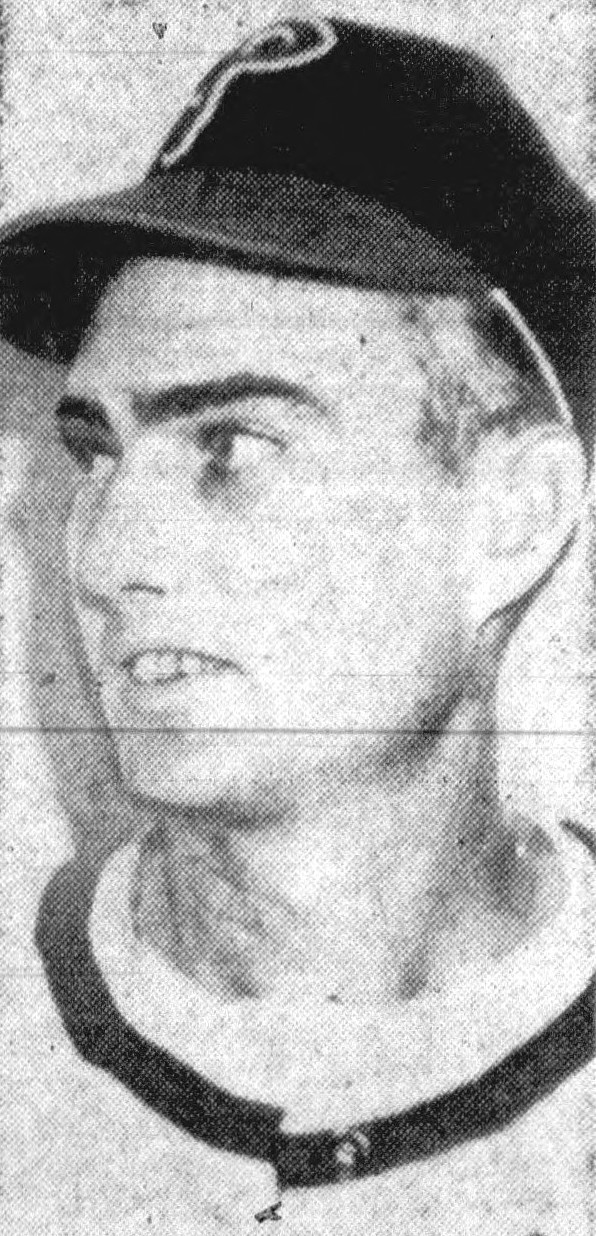
- Heintzelman, circa 1951
- Pitcher
- Born: October 14, 1915; Peruque, Missouri, U.S.
- Died: August 14, 2000 (aged 84); St. Peters, Missouri, U.S.
- Batted: Right Threw: Left

MLB debut
- October 3, 1937, for the Pittsburgh Pirates

Last MLB appearance
- August 13, 1952, for the Philadelphia Phillies

MLB statistics
- Win–loss record: 77–98
- Earned run average: 3.93
- Strikeouts: 564
- Stats at Baseball Reference

Teams
- Pittsburgh Pirates (1937–1942, 1946–1947); Philadelphia Phillies (1947–1952)

Kenneth Alphonse Heintzelman (October 14, 1915 – August 14, 2000) was an American professional baseball pitcher who played all or part of 13 seasons in Major League Baseball (MLB) for the Pittsburgh Pirates (1937–42 and 1946–47) and Philadelphia Phillies (1947–52). He threw left-handed, batted right-handed, and was listed as 5 feet 11 inches (1.80 m) tall and 185 pounds (84 kg). His son, Tom, was an MLB infielder during the 1970s.

== Baseball career ==
Heintzelman was born in Peruque, Missouri. He was originally signed by the Boston Braves in 1935, and was acquired by the Pirates the following year. In 1937—despite a frustrating minor league season that saw him lose 17 of 21 decisions in the Class A-1 Southern Association—he was recalled by Pittsburgh in the season's closing weeks and on Sunday, October 3, he made his MLB debut by throwing a complete game victory against the Cincinnati Reds, limiting the Reds to six hits and two earned runs. However, Heintzelman's first full year in the majors did not come until 1939.

Heintzelman lost three seasons (1943–45) in the prime of his career, serving in the United States Army in the 65th Reconnaissance Troop (Mechanized) of the 65th Infantry Division in the European theatre of World War II. He returned to the Pirates' pitching staff in 1946 and the following May his contract was sold to the Phillies.

Heintzelman's best season statistically was in 1949. He finished ninth in voting for the National League Most Valuable Player Award for leading the Senior Circuit in shutouts (five) and posted a 17–10 won–lost record in 33 games pitched (32 as a starter), with 15 complete games, 250 innings pitched, 239 hits allowed, 96 runs allowed, 84 earned runs allowed, 19 home runs allowed, 93 bases on balls allowed, 65 strikeouts. He recorded a 3.02 earned run average, fifth-lowest in the National League, and a 1.328 WHIP. His 17 wins, tied for tops on the Philadelphia staff, helped lead the Phillies to their first above-.500 season since 1932, and only their second winning record since 1917.

The following season, he was a veteran member of the "Whiz Kids", the Phillies' National League pennant winners, and started Game 3 of the 1950 World Series against the New York Yankees at Yankee Stadium. Heintzelman, who had recorded a mediocre 3–9 (4.09) mark during the regular season, rose to the occasion. He pitched brilliantly into the eighth inning, holding a 2–1 lead and limiting the Bombers to four hits through 72/3 innings. But he walked the bases loaded before he was relieved by Jim Konstanty, and the Yankees tied the contest on an unearned run that scored on an error. New York then scored the winning run in their half of the ninth inning off Russ Meyer. They went on to sweep the Phillies in four straight games.

Heintzelman's major-league career ended in August 1952, but he went on to pitch for three more seasons in the Triple-A International League before he retired from the mound.

In all or part of his 13 big-league seasons, Heintzelman had a 77–98 win–loss record, 319 games (183 started), 66 complete games, 18 shutouts, 72 games finished, 10 saves, 1,5012/3 innings pitched, 1,540 hits allowed, 746 runs allowed, 656 earned runs allowed, 100 home runs allowed, 630 walks allowed, 564 strikeouts, 14 hit batsmen, 33 wild pitches, 6,497 batters faced, 4 balks, a 3.93 ERA and a 1.445 WHIP.

Ken Heintzelman died in St. Peters, Missouri, in 2000 at the age of 84.
