= Tommaso Mocenigo =

Doge of Venice from 1414 to 1423

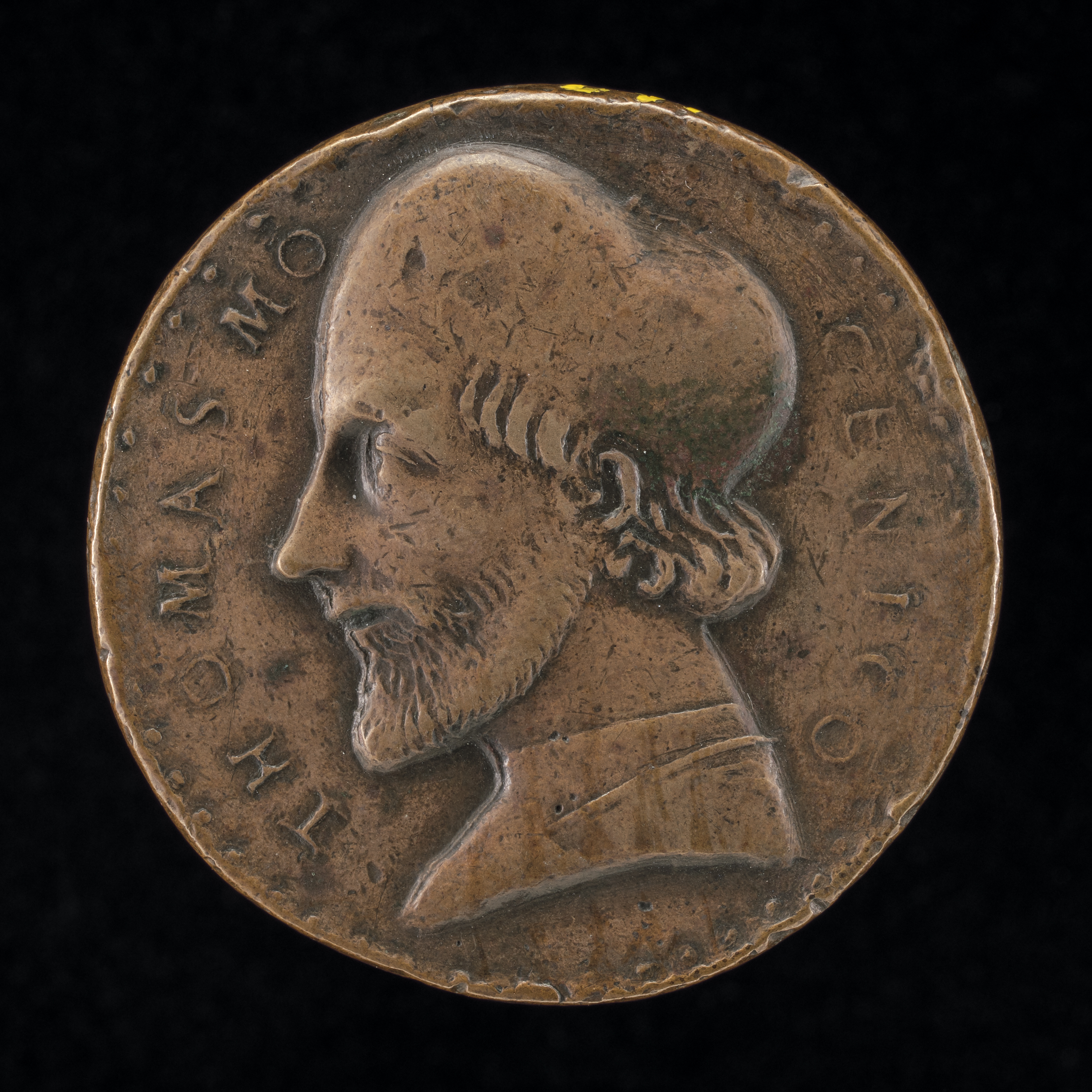

Doge of Venice
- In office 1414–1423
- Preceded by: Michele Steno
- Succeeded by: Francesco Foscari

Personal details
- Born: 1343 Venice, Republic of Venice
- Died: 4 April 1423 (aged 79–80) Venice, Republic of Venice

Tommaso Mocenigo (1343–1423) was doge (chief magistrate) of the Republic of Venice from 1414 until his death.

== Biography ==
He commanded the crusading fleet in the expedition to Nicopolis in 1396 and also won battles against the Genoese during the War of Chioggia of 1378–1381.

While he was Venetian ambassador at Cremona, he was elected doge (1414), after previously being a procurator of St Mark's basilica, and he had escaped in secret, fearing that he might be held a prisoner by Gabrino Fondolo, tyrant of that city. He made peace with the Turkish sultan, but, when hostilities broke out afresh, his fleet defeated that of the Turks at the Battle of Gallipoli.

During his reign, the patriarch of Aquileia Louis of Teck formed an anti-Venetian alliance with Emperor Sigismund. Venice, under a double-sided attack, was able to launch an offensive that, in 1419–1420, conquered Udine, Cividale, Feltre, Belluno and most of Friuli from the Aquileian patriarchate. The Cadore also surrendered spontaneously. The ensuing treaty led to a peace with Hungary and the annexation of the patriarchate's lands to the Republic of Venice.

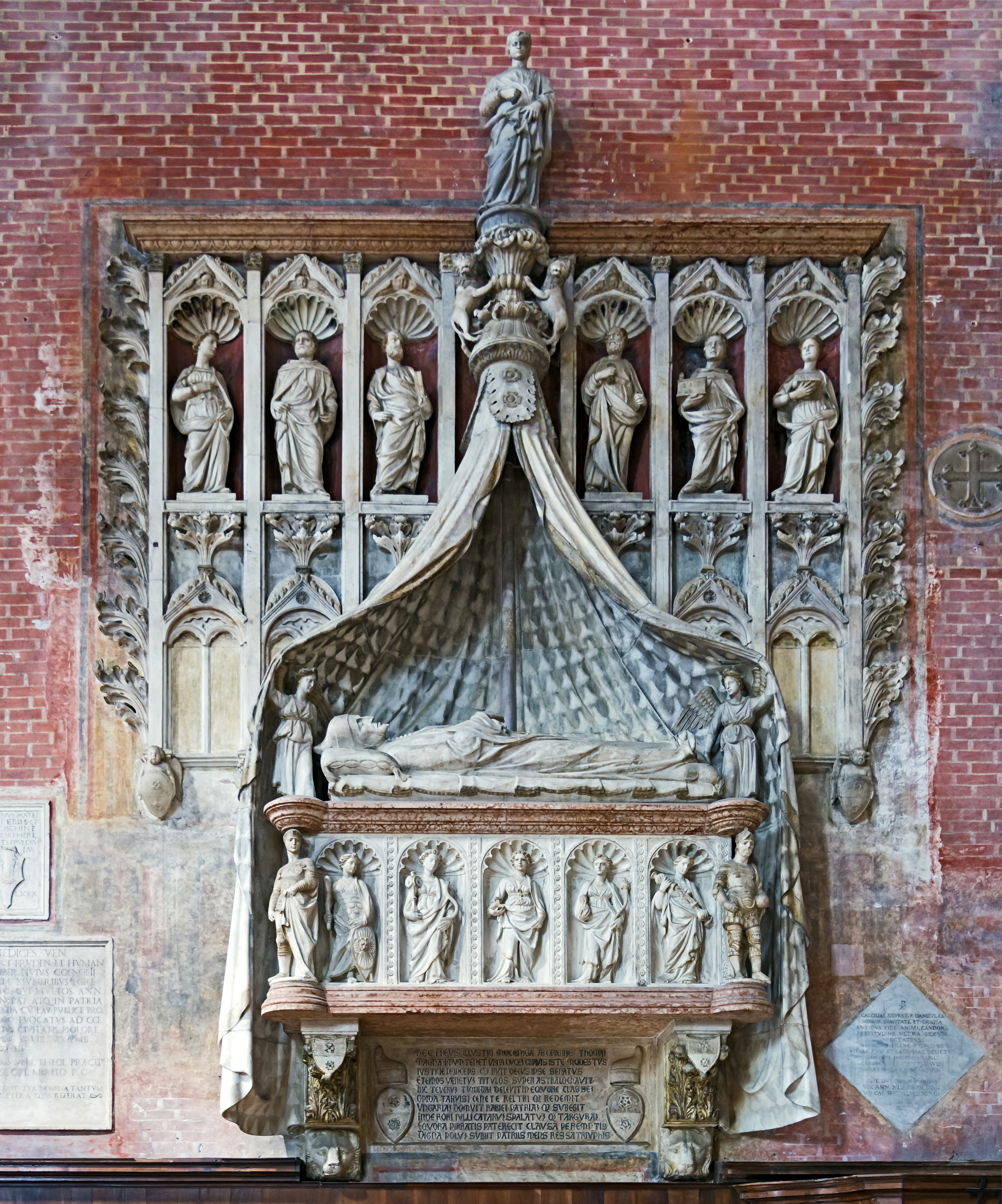
The tomb of Tommaso Mocenigo in the church of San Giovanni e Paolo

Mocenigo greatly encouraged commerce, reconstructed the ducal palace and commenced the dogal library. He died after a long illness in 1423. He was interred in the Basilica di San Giovanni e Paolo, a traditional burial place of the doges.

== See also ==
- Mocenigo family

Political offices
Preceded by Michele Steno	Doge of Venice; 1413–1423	Succeeded by Francesco Foscari
