= Firma, Missouri =

Extinct hamlet in Missouri, U.S.

Coordinates: 38°53′21″N 90°40′33″W

Firma is an extinct town in St. Charles County, in the U.S. state of Missouri. The GNIS classifies it as a populated place.

A post office called Firma was established in 1901, and remained in operation until 1924. The community is named after a railroad employee, according to local history.

Firma is now located on Dalbow Road.
