= Domini di Terraferma =

Hinterland territories of the Republic of Venice

Mainland domains Domini de Teraferma (Venetian)
- Domain of the Republic of Venice
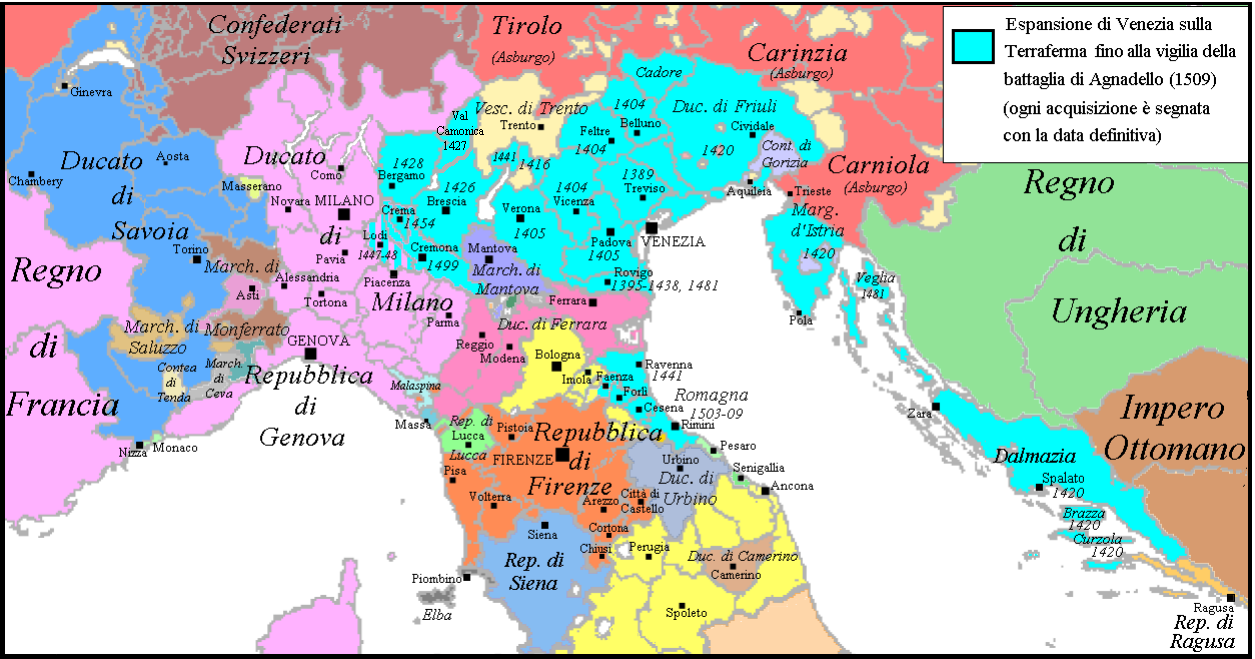
- Turquoise color shows the extent of the Terraferma in 1509.
- Historical era: Early modern period
  - War of Padua: 1404–1405
  - Ludovico Trevisan surrenders the Patria del Friuli: 1445
  - Battle of Maclodio: 11 October 1427
  - Treaty of Lodi: 9 April 1454
  - Treaty of Bagnolo: 7 August 1484
  - War of the League of Cambrai: 1508–16
  - Treaty of Campo Formio: 17 October 1797
Preceded by
Verona
Carraresi
Patria del Friuli
Succeeded by
Venetian Province
Cisalpine Republic

The Domini di Terraferma (lit. 'mainland domains') or Stato da Tera (lit. 'mainland state') was the hinterland territories of the Republic of Venice beyond the Adriatic coast in Northeast Italy. They were one of the three subdivisions of the Republic's possessions, the other two being the original Dogado (Duchy) and the Stato da Màr (maritime territories).

== Geography ==
At its greatest extent, it included the present-day Italian regions of Veneto, Western and Central Friuli-Venezia Giulia and the eastern parts of Lombardy (i.e. the present-day Bergamo and Brescia provinces) up to the Adda River, where it bordered on the Imperial Duchy of Milan.

In the south the lower Po River (Polesine) formed the border with the Papal States. The Terraferma comprised the western and central parts of the historic Friuli region, except for the easternmost part along the Isonzo River, which was held by the Imperial counts of Gorizia. In the north, the Carnic and Julian Alps marked the border with the Inner Austrian duchies of Carinthia and Carniola.

== History ==
Venice had conquered the Mestre mainland from the Scaliger rulers at Verona in 1337 during the Scaliger War, followed by Treviso and Bassano del Grappa in 1339. The development of the Terraferma province actually began with the accession of Doge Michele Steno in 1400, who systematically campaigned in the Venetian hinterland in order to secure trade and sustenance for the citizens of Venice. His successors Tommaso Mocenigo and Francesco Foscari enlarged the possessions to the disadvantage not only of the Scaligeri, but also of the Carraresi at Padua (Lord Francesco Novello da Carrara was executed in 1406) and the Visconti at Milan.

In 1420, Venice annexed the Friulian territories of the Imperial Patriarchate of Aquileia from the Adriatic coast up to Pontebba in the Julian Alps. Emperor Sigismund had to acknowledge the acquisition in 1433; four years later he officially ceded the territory to Venice as an Imperial fief. In 1523 Emperor Charles V finally renounced all titles as feudal lord.

On the fall of the Republic and the Treaty of Campo Formio, the Domini spent a short while under French rule until Napoleon ceded it to Austria in 1797, and in 1805 the former Domini were united with the Napoleonic Kingdom of Italy (1805–14), and in 1815 with what was left of Lombardy to make the Kingdom of Lombardy–Venetia under the control of the Austrian Empire. It was united with the Kingdom of Italy in 1866, as a result of the Third Italian War of Independence.

== Sources ==
- Berengo, Marino. Il governo veneziano a Ravenna (PDF) (in Italian). Archived from the original (PDF) on 2009-12-11.
- Da Mosto, Andrea (1937). L'Archivio di Stato di Venezia (in Italian). Rome: Biblioteca d'Arte editrice.
- Mallett, Michael E. (1996). "La conquista della Terraferma". In Alberto Tenenti; Ugo Tucci (eds.). Storia di Venezia. Dalle origini alla caduta della Serenissima. Vol. IV: Il Rinascimento. Politica e cultura (in Italian). Rome: Enciclopedia Italiana. pp. 181–244. OCLC 644711024.
- Mutinelli, Fabio (1852). Lessico Veneto (in Italian). Venice: tipografia Giambattista Andreola.
- Viggiano, Alfredo (1996). "Il Dominio da terra: politica e istituzioni". In Alberto Tenenti; Ugo Tucci (eds.). Storia di Venezia. Dalle origini alla caduta della Serenissima. Vol. IV: Il Rinascimento. Politica e cultura (in Italian). Rome: Enciclopedia Italiana. pp. 465–528. OCLC 644711024.
