= Santa Maria Gloriosa dei Frari =

Basilica di Santa Maria Gloriosa dei Frari
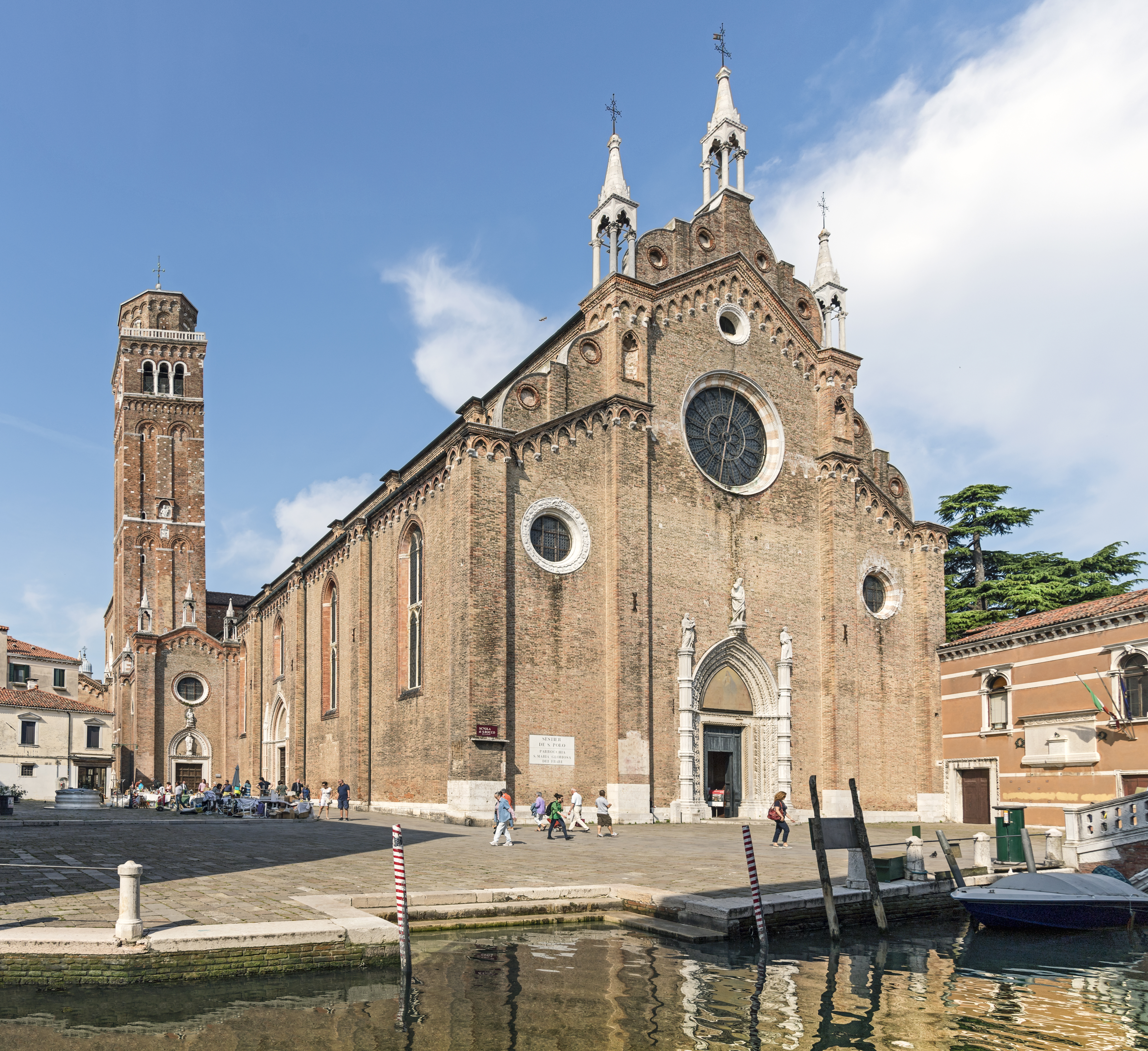
- Facade of Santa Maria Gloriosa dei Frari with bell tower behind
- Click the map for an interactive, fullscreen view
- 45°26′12″N 12°19′34″E
- Location: Venice
- Country: Italy
- Denomination: Catholic Church
- Religious order: Franciscans
- Website: basilicadeifrari.it

History
- Status: Conventual church Minor basilica
- Dedication: Assumption of Mary
- Consecrated: 27 May 1492

Architecture
- Architectural type: Church
- Style: Venetian Gothic architecture
- Groundbreaking: 1250
- Completed: 1338

Specifications
- Length: 102 metres (335 ft)
- Width: 32 metres (105 ft)

The Basilica di Santa Maria Gloriosa dei Frari, commonly abbreviated to the Frari, is a church located in the Campo dei Frari at the heart of the San Polo district of Venice, Italy. It is one of the largest churches in the city and it has the status of a minor basilica. The church is dedicated to the Assumption of Mary.

The imposing edifice is built of brick and is one of the three notable churches in the city that retain most of their Venetian Gothic appearance. In common with many Franciscan churches, the exterior is rather plain, even on the front facade. The exterior features a bell tower that was repaired in the early 2000s for structural problems.

The interior is notable for many tombs and works of art that accumulated in the centuries after it was built. It contains many very grand wall monuments to distinguished Venetians buried in the church, including a number of Doges. Many of these are important works in the history of Venetian sculpture, including that by Donatello. Paintings in situ include two large and important altarpieces by Titian, the Assumption of the Virgin on the high altar and the Pesaro Madonna in a chapel. The basilica also contains the only rood screen still in place in a church in Venice, a vestige of the Venetian Gothic architecture that preceded Venetian Renaissance architecture.

== History ==
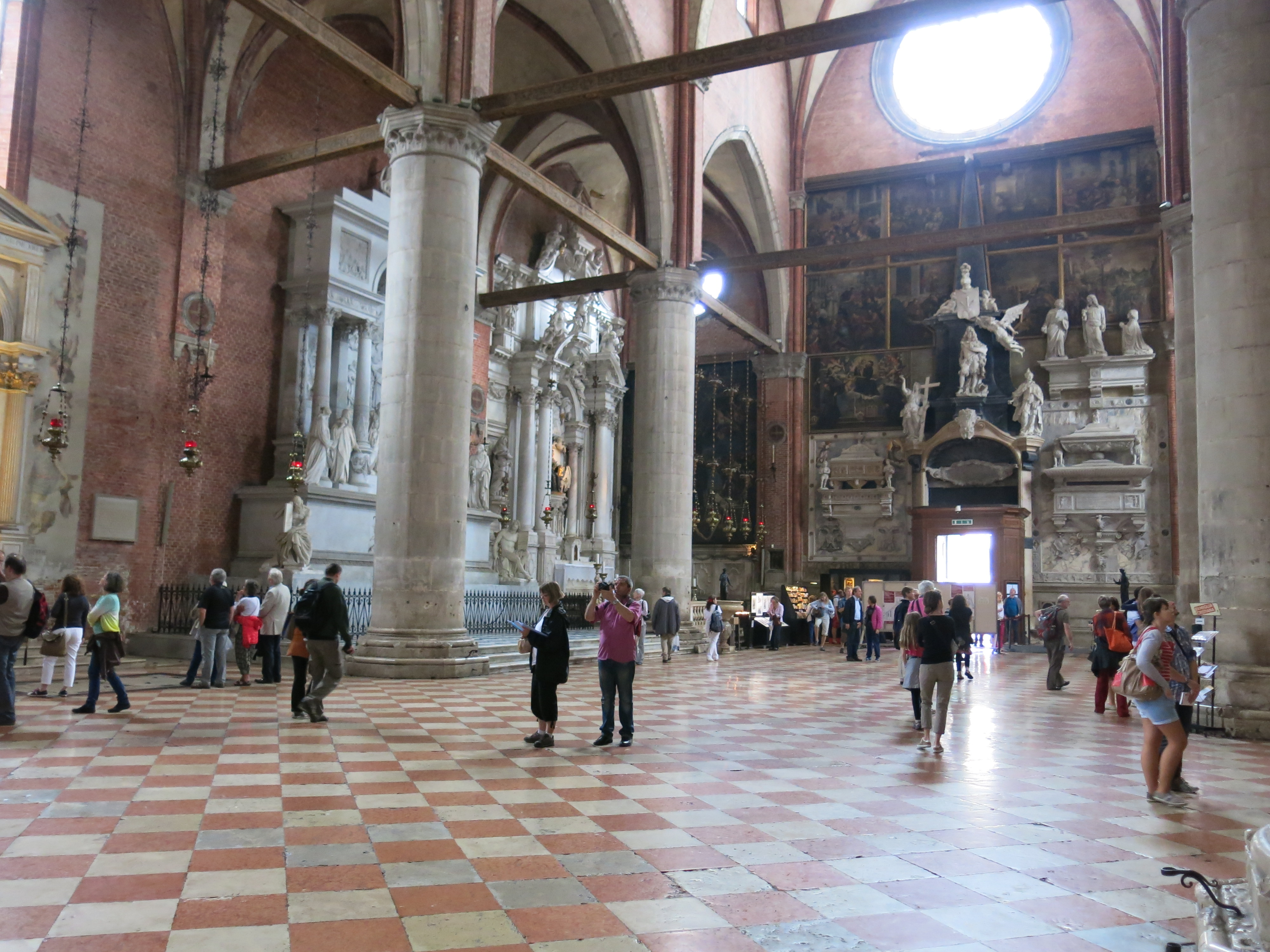
Interior, looking toward the entrance in the front wall

In 1231, under Doge Jacopo Tiepolo, the city donated land at this site to establish a monastery and church belonging to the Franciscan Order of Friars Minor. This edifice proved too small and a three-nave church was begun in 1250, but not completed until 1338. Work almost immediately began on its much larger replacement, the current church, which took more than a century to build. The new church inverted the original orientation, thus placing the facade so that it faces the plaza and small canal. The work was started under Jacopo Celega, but completed by his son Pier Paolo. The campanile, the second tallest in the city after that of San Marco, was completed in 1396. Under the patronage of Giovanni Corner, the Chapel of San Marco was added in 1420. In 1432-1434, Bishop Vicenza Pietro Miani built the chapel of San Pietro next to the bell-tower. The facade was not completed until 1440. The cornice is surmounted by three statues (1516) by Lorenzo Bregno. The main altar was consecrated in 1469. In 1478, the Pesaro family commissioned a chapel in the apse of the church. On 27 May 1492, the church was consecrated with the name of Santa Maria Gloriosa.

The Frari is a parish church of the Vicariate of San Polo-Santa Croce-Dorsoduro. Other churches of the parish are San Barnaba, San Ludovico Vescovo, Santa Maria del Soccorso, and Santa Margherita. In the sixteenth century, however, devotional life changed significantly; being private, less moral, and contained people from various countries. The congregations enlarged only when a famous preacher was preaching, or a major feast was taking place. All connections had a relationship with the brotherhood involved in the church, as most of the other chapel areas were designed for private groups. This church is notable to hosting funerals and other gatherings for the deceased. Also, in later times, there was some crime and mischief going on with the church. As a result, the Franciscans had been expelled from the church during the nineteenth century, the church was restored to the order in 1922. The bell tower went through a structural intervention from 1904 to the 1990s that helped fix the cracks in the bell tower.

Titian, the most prominent sixteenth-century Venetian painter, is interred in the Frari.

== Architectural Features ==
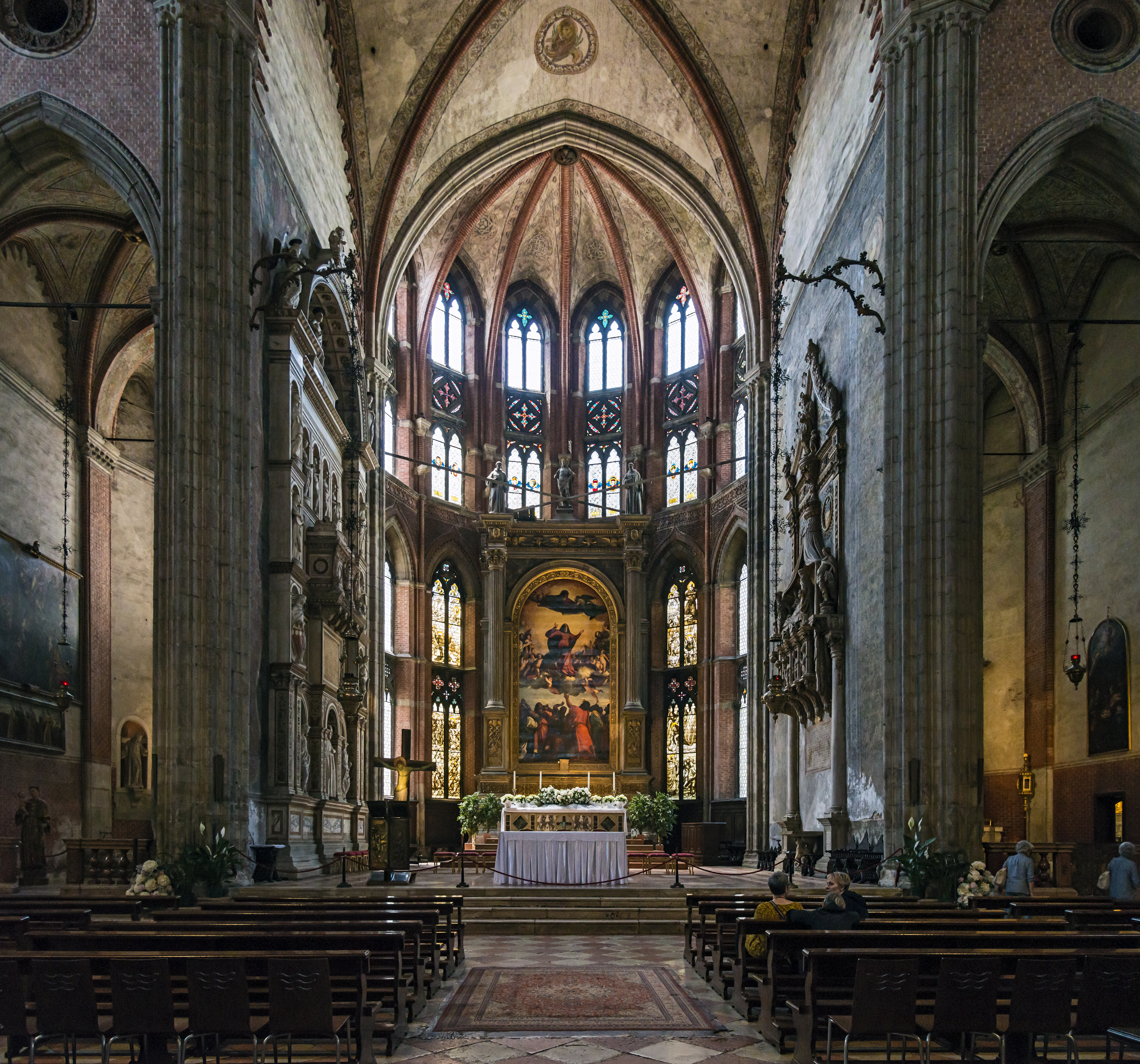
High altar showing Assumption of the Virgin by Titian

The church overall is in the Venetian style, as the walls were made of red brick, the beams were decorated on the inside, and details were made of Istrian stone. In common with many Franciscan churches, the exterior is rather plain, even on the front facade.

It also has Roman influence, because the columns in the nave contain large cylindrical shafts. The church also contains six smaller chapels as well as the main chapel, three on each side of the main chapel. The baptistery and sacristy were featured along with two other chapels, making the church a family chapel.

The church overall has a vaulted Gothic rib ceiling, making the interior volume large. The church does not have a central dome, making it unique. The materials used were mostly hard and resonant, from marble and Istrian stone tile floors, to masonry walls, and vaults with brick covered with intonaco.

== Bell tower structural intervention ==
Following the collapse of St. Mark's bell tower, cracks started to form on the Frari bell tower in 1904. This led to a structural intervention at the Frari. An investigation of the Frari bell tower began in 1990. With structural problems identified in 2000, the tower was investigated deeply in 2001-2003 using a monitoring system to identify crack patterns. The stress was also measured using flat-jack testing. Overall, the tower was inspected geotecnically in great detail, including the use of standard penetration tests and digging through the bell tower foundation. A structural analysis of the bell tower was then performed, and the forces and loads needed to fix the tower were calculated. After the investigation, several instruments, including a crack-gauge and a strain gauge were used to keep track of the work on the bell tower in real time.

Strengthening interventions were conducted to keep the tower safe and used with a structural-geotechnical monitoring system. The first phase involved using a steel cable connecting one of the columns to the bell tower of the Frari. The second phase involved injecting mortar into the soil so that the soil would be strengthened in order to accommodate the increased stress. The most information derived during the first phase came directly from the bell tower and the precision leveling. The mortar was grouted to determine the velocity of the different intervention phases. At the end, the settlement velocity decreased. The third and final phase of the intervention involved a structural joint between the tower and the church. Although it took six months to execute and resulted in extensive deformations in the tower, it was successful and has prevented damage to the bell tower and parts of the church. Overall, soil-fracture intervention and structural-joint execution both use the direct pendulum. The structural joint contributes to prevention of future cracks when seismic loads occur.

== Interior plan ==
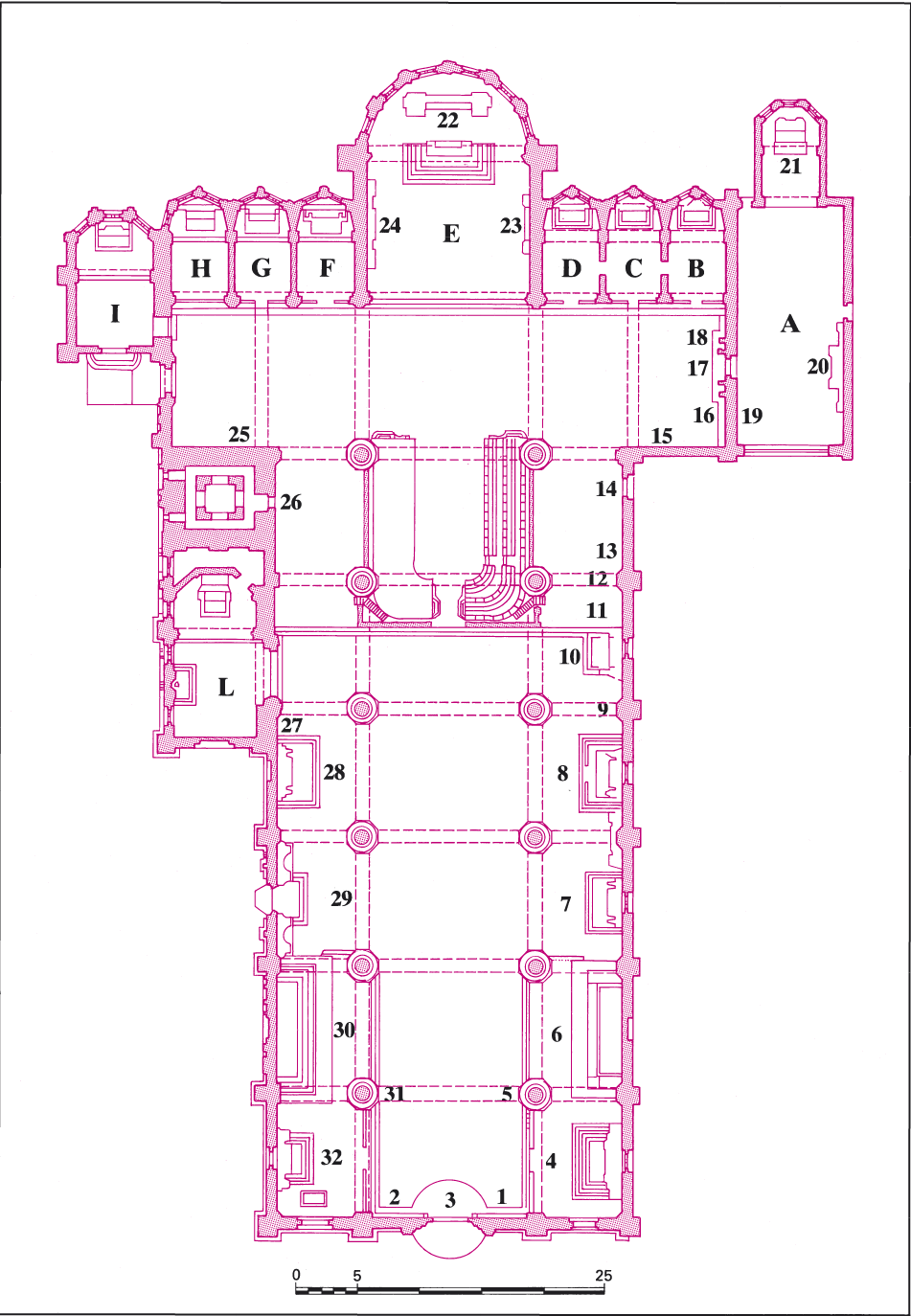
Plan of the basilica.

The plan of the church resembled a typical Gothic cathedral, as it was shaped like a Latin cross, and featured aisles on the sides. The list below indicates what is located on the image of the plan, shown below.

1. Monument of Alvise Pasqualigo, Procurator of St. Mark;
2. Monument of Pietro Bernardo;
3. Monument of Girolamo Garzoni; Right nave:
4. First altar;
5. First pier, holy water font with Meekness;
6. Second bay, monument to Titian;
7. Second altar;
8. Third altar;
9. Urn of Jacopo Barbaro, captain in the 1480 war against the Turks;
10. Fourth altar;
11. Monument to Marco Zen, bishop of Torcello;
12. Monument of Giuseppe Bottari, bishop of Pola;
13. Monument of Benedetto Brugnolo of Legnago;
14. Wooden urn;
15. Monument to Jacopo Marcello, generalissimo killed at the assault of Gallipoli;
16. Monument of Blessed Pacifico (Friar Scipione Bon);
17. Monument of Benedetto Pesaro, sea captain;
18. Monument of Paolo Savelli, Roman patrician in service of the Republic;
19. Tabernacle of the relic of the Blood of Christ;
20. Altar of the Relics;
21. Altar;
22. Main altar, Assumption altarpiece by Titian;
23. Monument of Doge Francesco Foscari;
24. Monument of Doge Nicolò Tron;
25. Monument of Generosa Orsini Zen;
26. Bell tower door;
27. Monument of Jacopo Pesaro;
28. Second altar;
29. Mausoleum of Doge Giovanni Pesaro;
30. Monument of Antonio Canova;
31. First pier with holy water font with statuette of St. Anthony of Padua;
32. First altar (32), 17th century, Crucifix and sculptures attributed to Josse Le Court.

(A) Sacristy; Apse chapels: (B) Bernardo Chapel; (C) Sacrament Chapel; (D) Florentine Chapel. (E) Presbytery; (F) Chapel of St. Francis; (G) Trevisan Chapel; (H) Milanese Chapel; (I) Corner or St. Mark Chapel; (L) Emiliani or St. Peter Chapel.

== Choir Screen ==
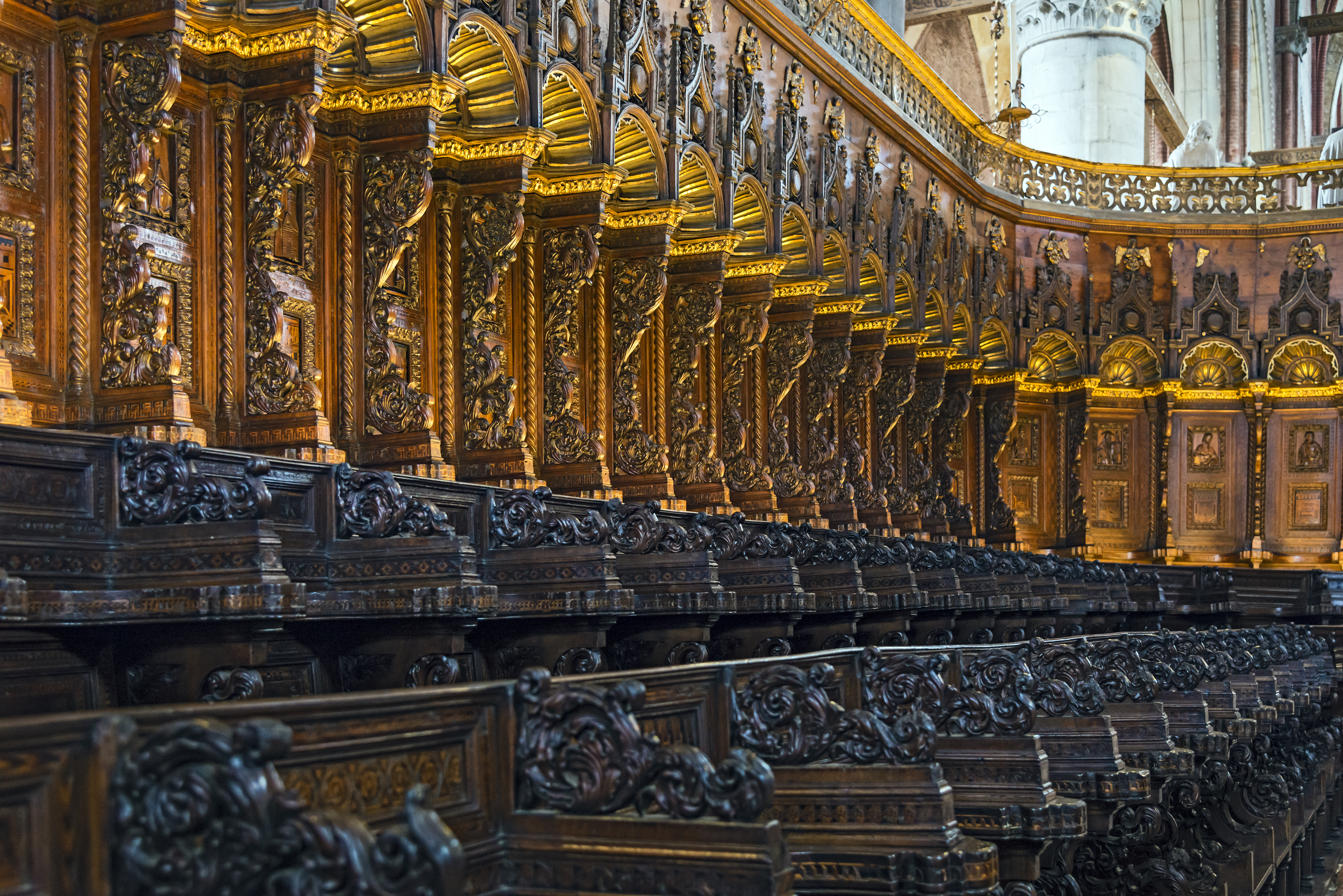
Choir stalls by Marco Cozzi

In 1475, a choir screen was built at the Santa Maria Gloriosa dei Frari so that during the service, the friars were separated from everyone else. It remains the only choir screen in Venice today. The front of the screen has much Gothic influence, especially from the late Gothic era. Some of the styles on the screen today were in historical Venetian fashion. Some elements have a classical influence, such as the leaves that were formed on the pilasters. The screen had an inscription on the front that was created in addition to the main curtain screen that came from the Romans. The design of the screen had works that influenced from other churches, such as San Zaccaria, Ss. Giovanni E Paolo, and San Michele in Isola.

== Works of art ==
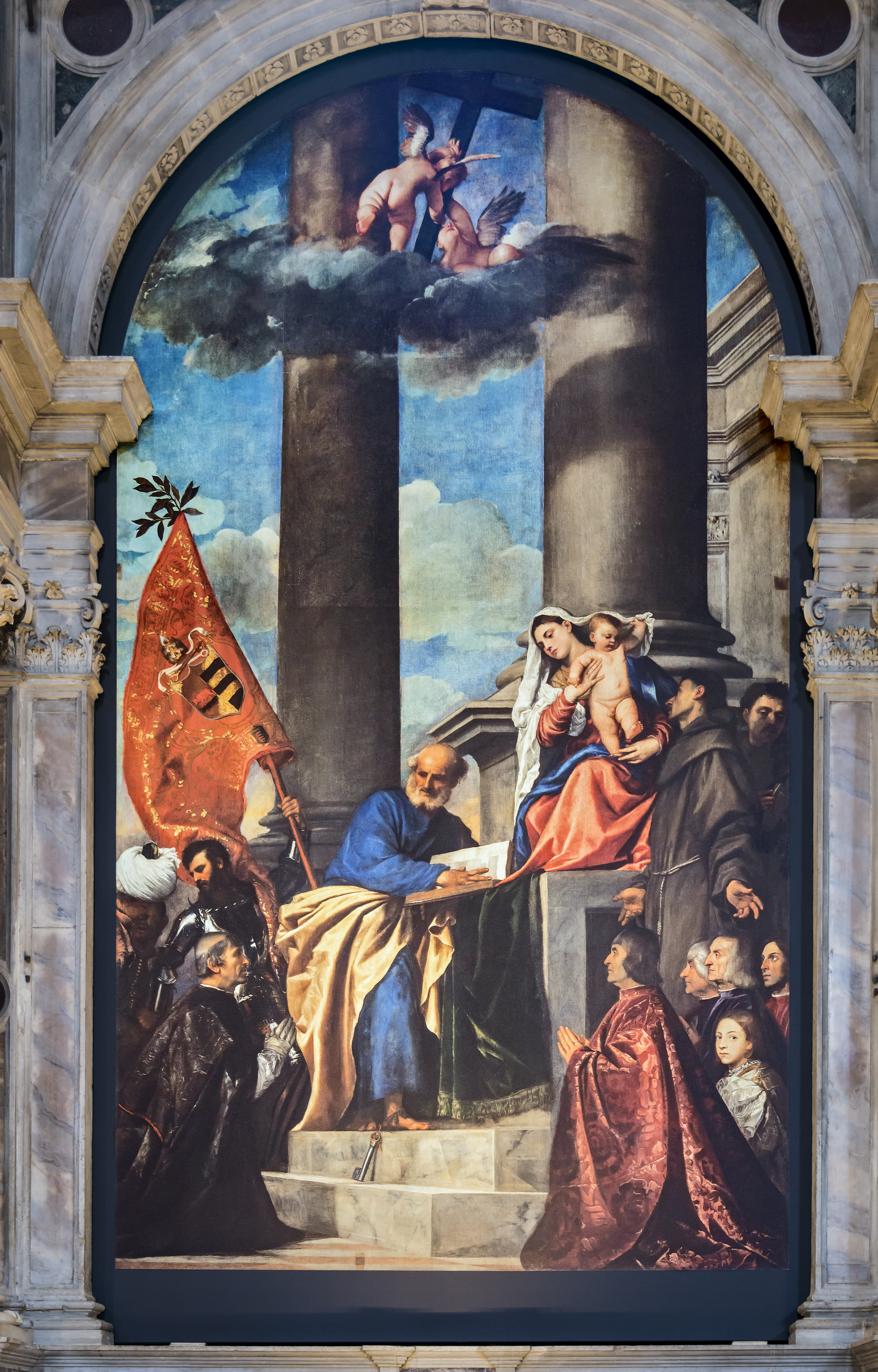
Titian's Pesaro Madonna, 1519–1526

- Assumption of the Virgin by Titian
- Titian, Pesaro Madonna on the north wall of the nave
- Giovanni Bellini, Frari Triptych
- Antonio and Paolo Bregno, tomb of Doge Francesco Foscari in the chancel (attributed; may be by Niccolò di Giovanni Fiorentino)
- Lorenzo Bregno, tomb of Benedetto Pésaro above the sacristy door
- Girolamo Campagna, statuettes of St. Anthony of Padua and St. Agnes on the water stoups in the nave
- Marco Cozzi, choir stalls in the choir
- Donatello, figure of St. John the Baptist in the first south choir chapel, first documented work in Venice by Donatello
- Tullio Lombardo, tomb of Pietro Bernardo on the west wall (attributed; may be by Giovanni Buora)
- Antonio Rizzo, tomb of Doge Niccolò Tron in the chancel
- Jacopo Sansovino, damaged figure of St. John the Baptist on the font in the Corner Chapel
- Palma il Giovane, Martyrdom of St. Catherine from Alexandria / Martirio di santa Caterina d'Alessandria (1590-1595)
- Paolo Veneziano, Doge Francesco Dandolo and His Wife Presented to the Virgin by Ss. Francis and Elizabeth in the sacristy
- Alessandro Vittoria
- Giambattista Pittoni, Hagar in the desert, Oil on Canvas, sacristy
- Bartolomeo Bon's workshop, figures of the Virgin and St. Francis on the west front
  - figure of The Risen Christ on the west front
  - figure of St. Jerome on the south wall of the nave
- Alvise Vivarini, St. Ambrose and other Saints in the north transept chapel, his last work
- Bartolomeo Vivarini
  - St. Mark Enthroned in the Capella Corner in the north transept
  - Madonna and Child with Saints, altarpiece in the third south choir chapel
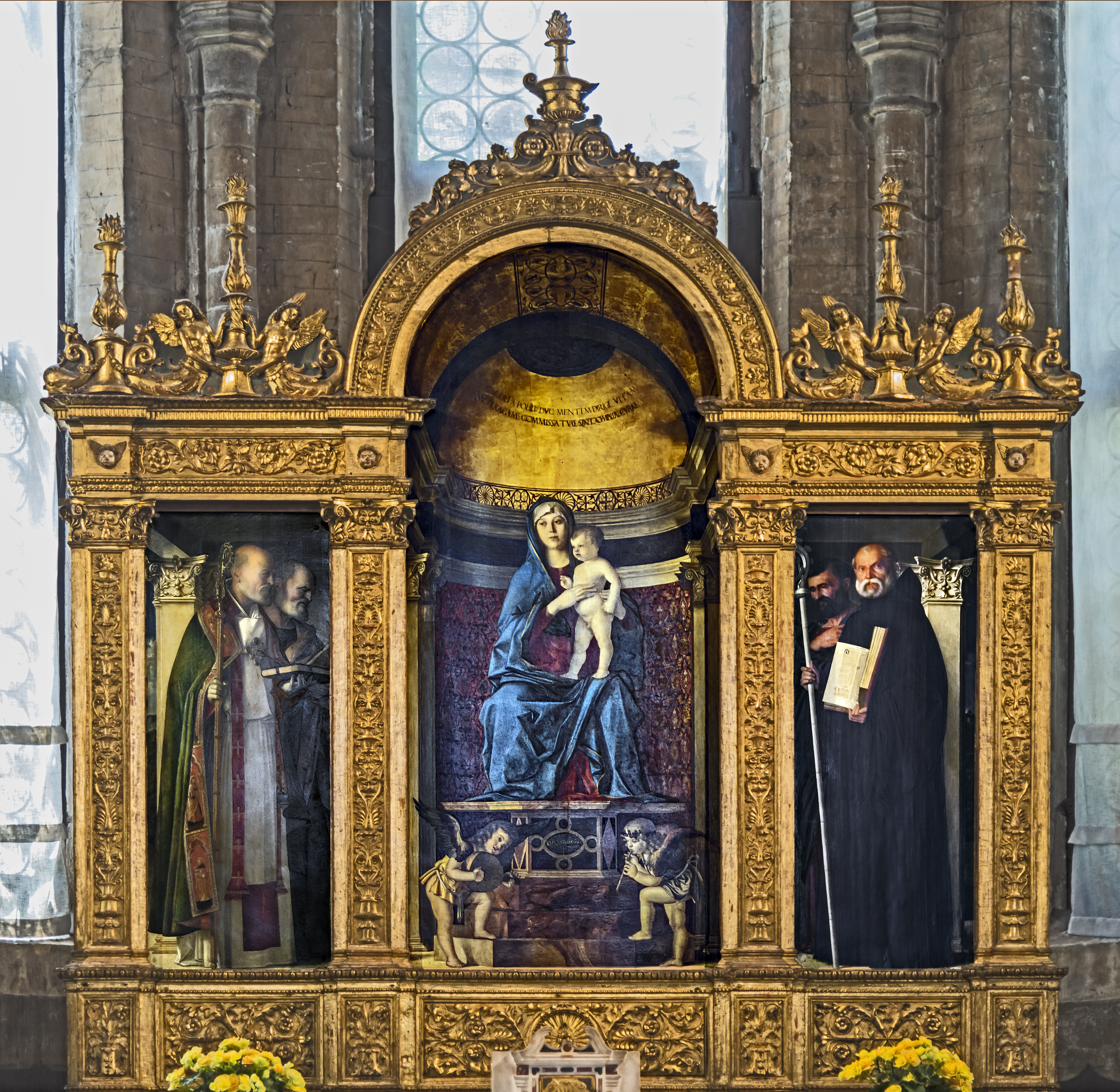
Giovanni Bellini, Madonna and Child with Ss. Nicholas of Bari, Peter, Mark, and Benedict

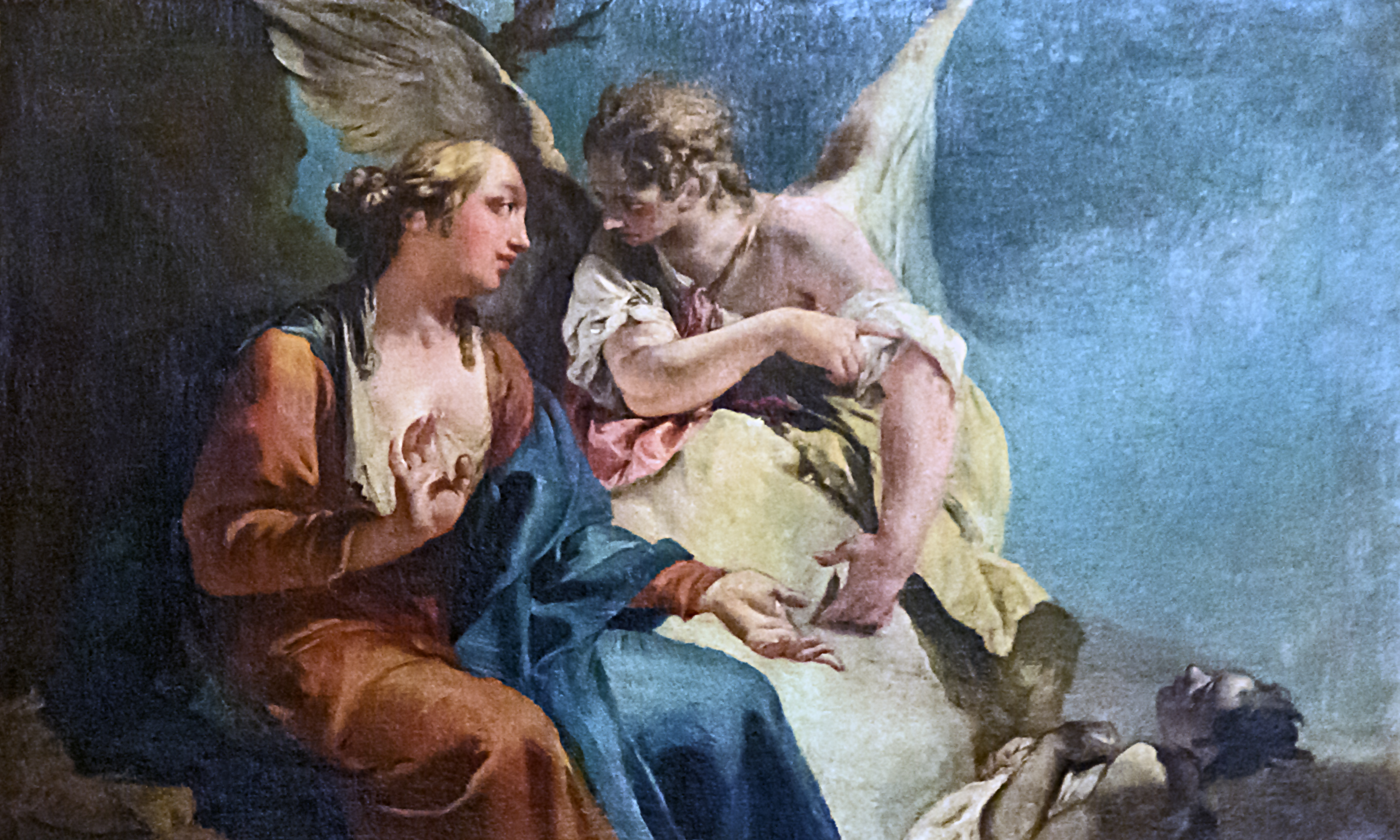
Giambattista Pittoni, Hagar in the desert

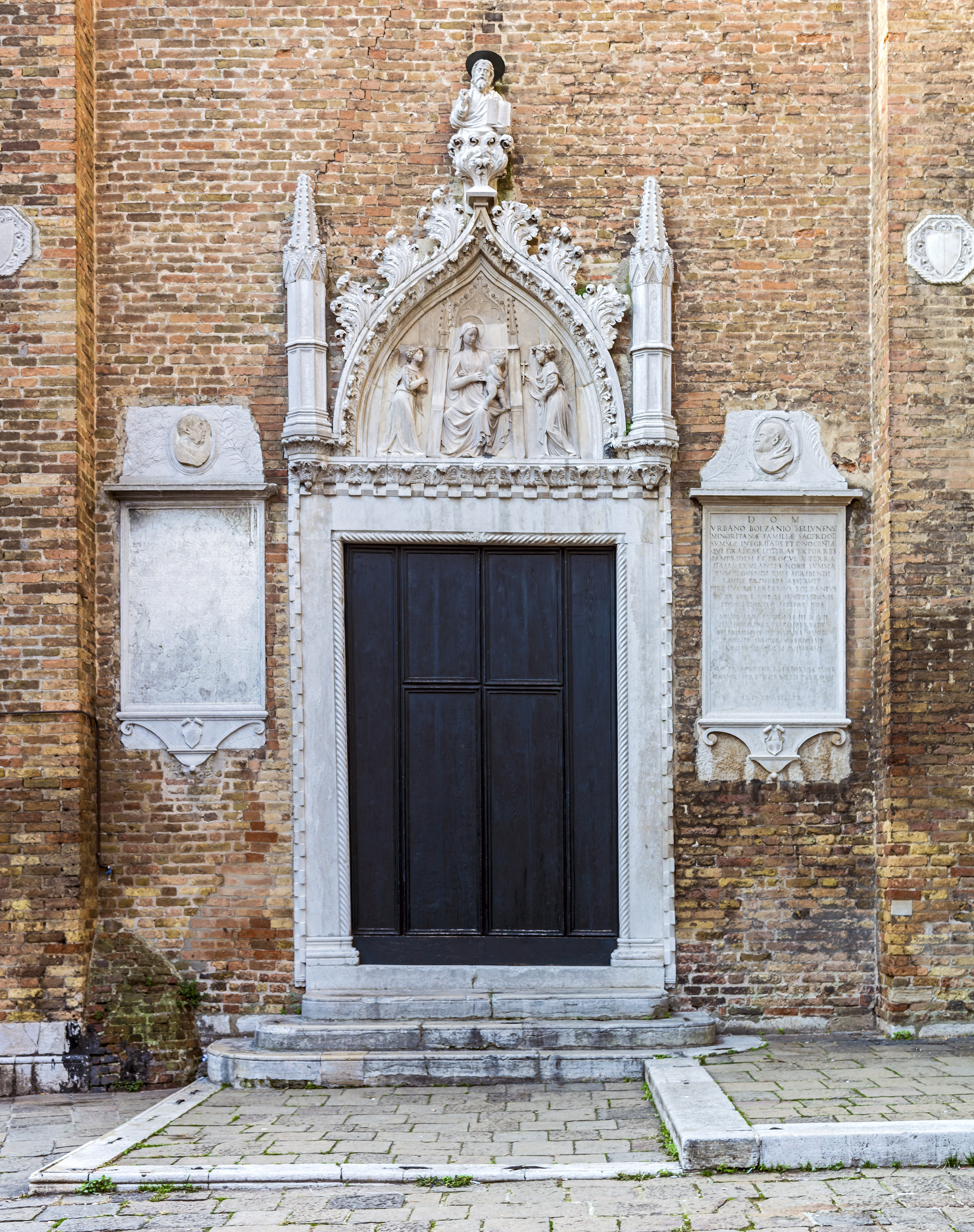
Bartolomeo Bon the Virgin and St. Francis on the west front

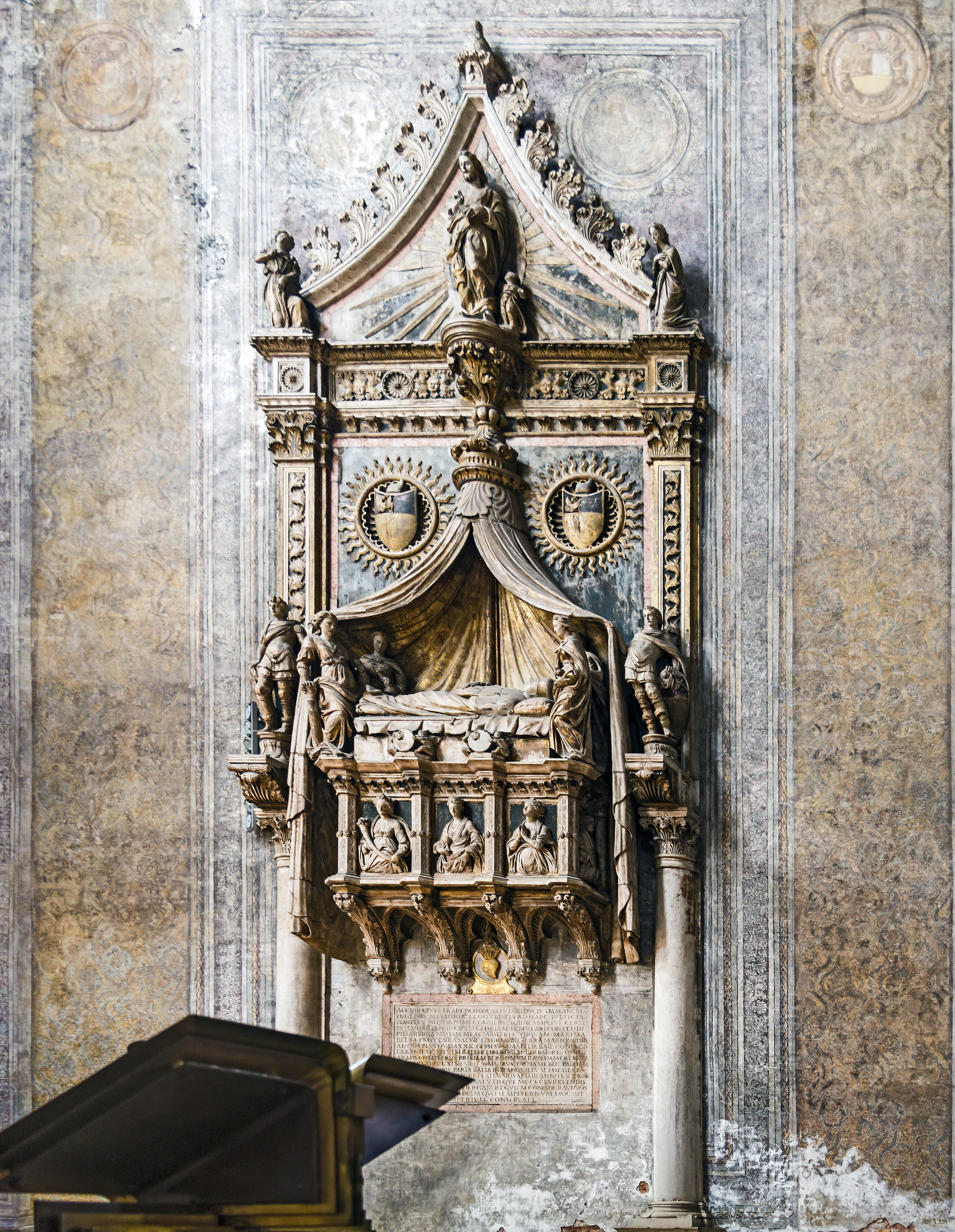
Antonio and Paolo Bregno, tomb of Doge Francesco Foscari

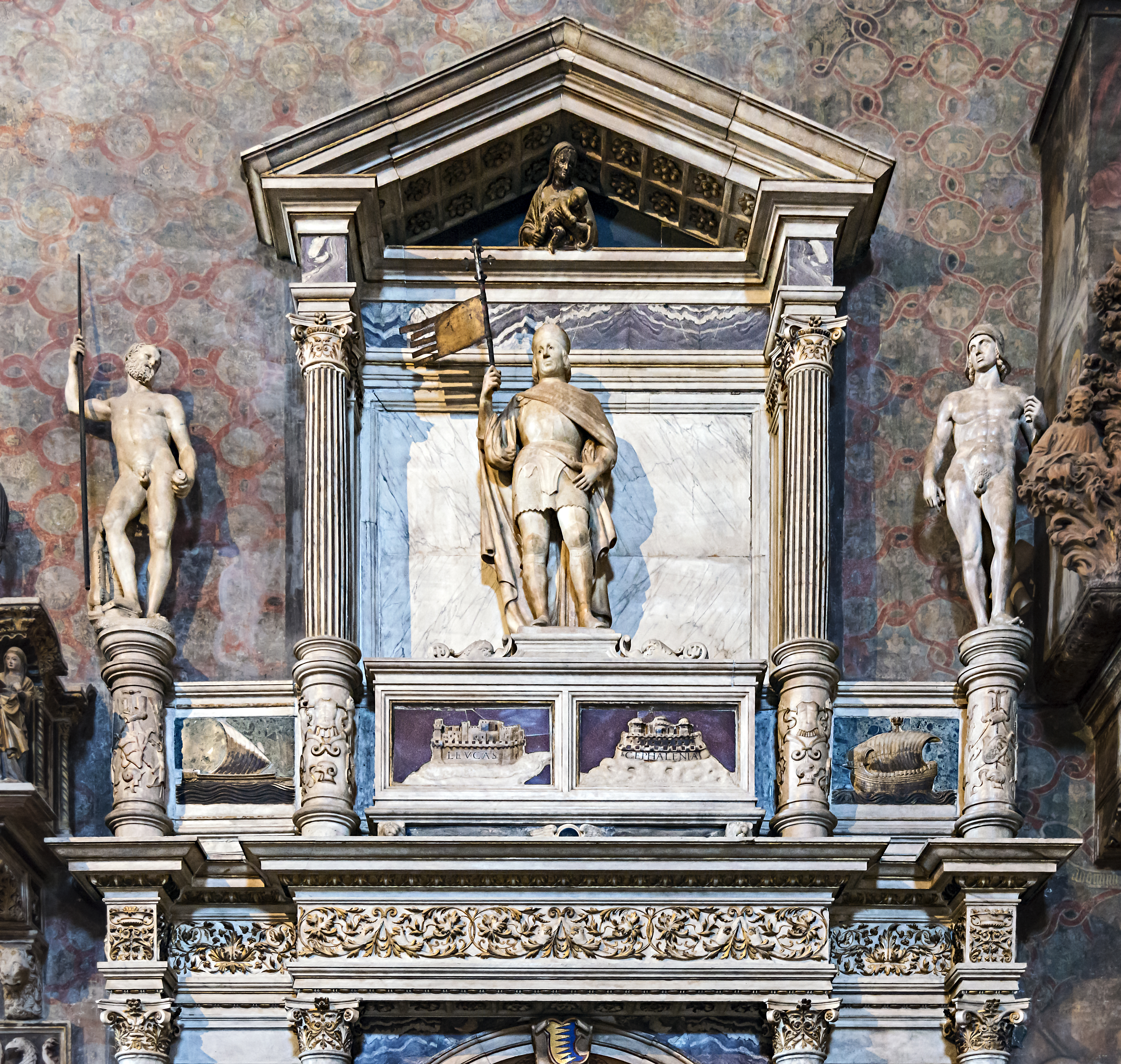
Lorenzo Bregno tomb of Benedetto Pésaro

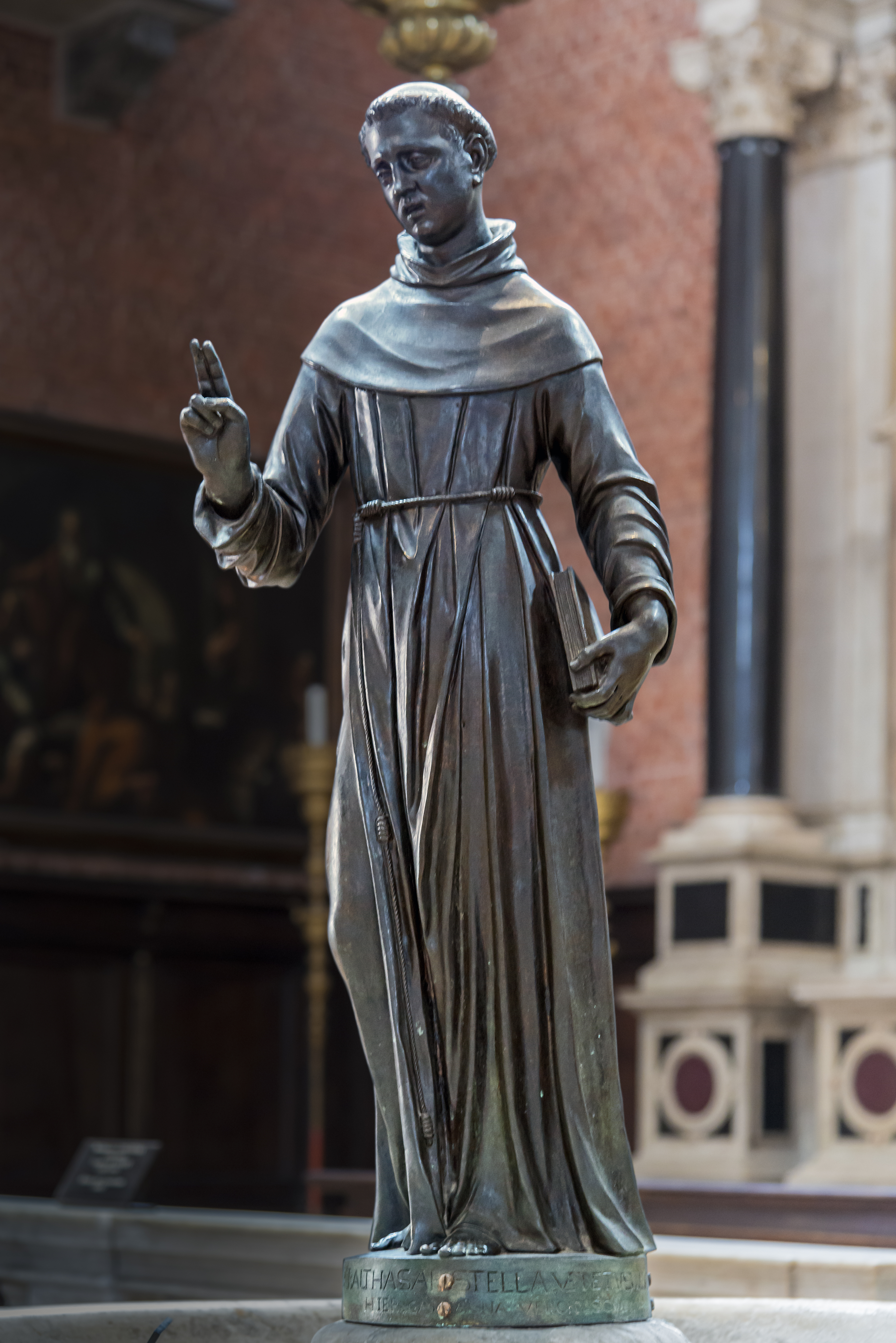
Girolamo Campagna,St Anthony of Padua

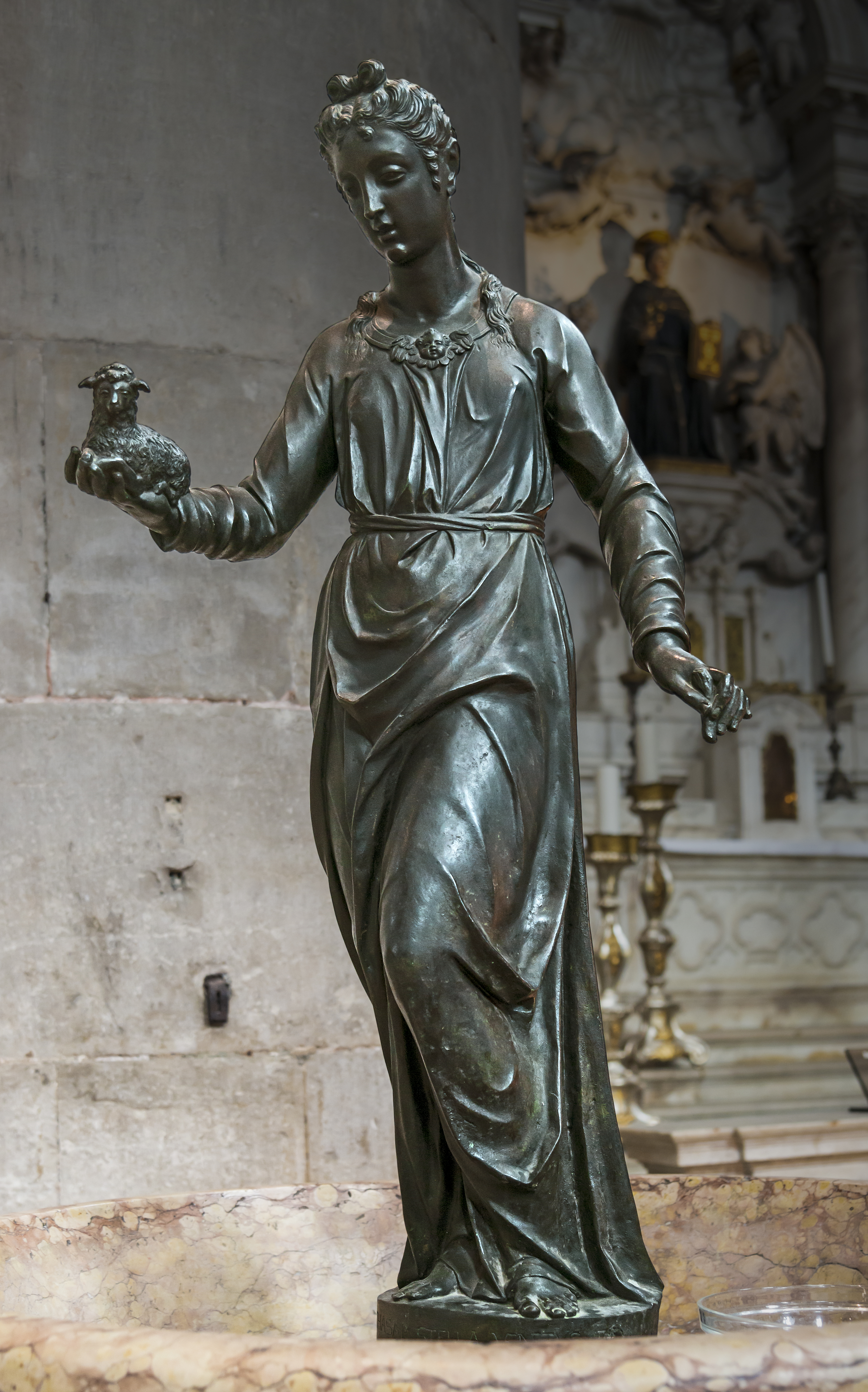
Girolamo Campagna, St Agnes

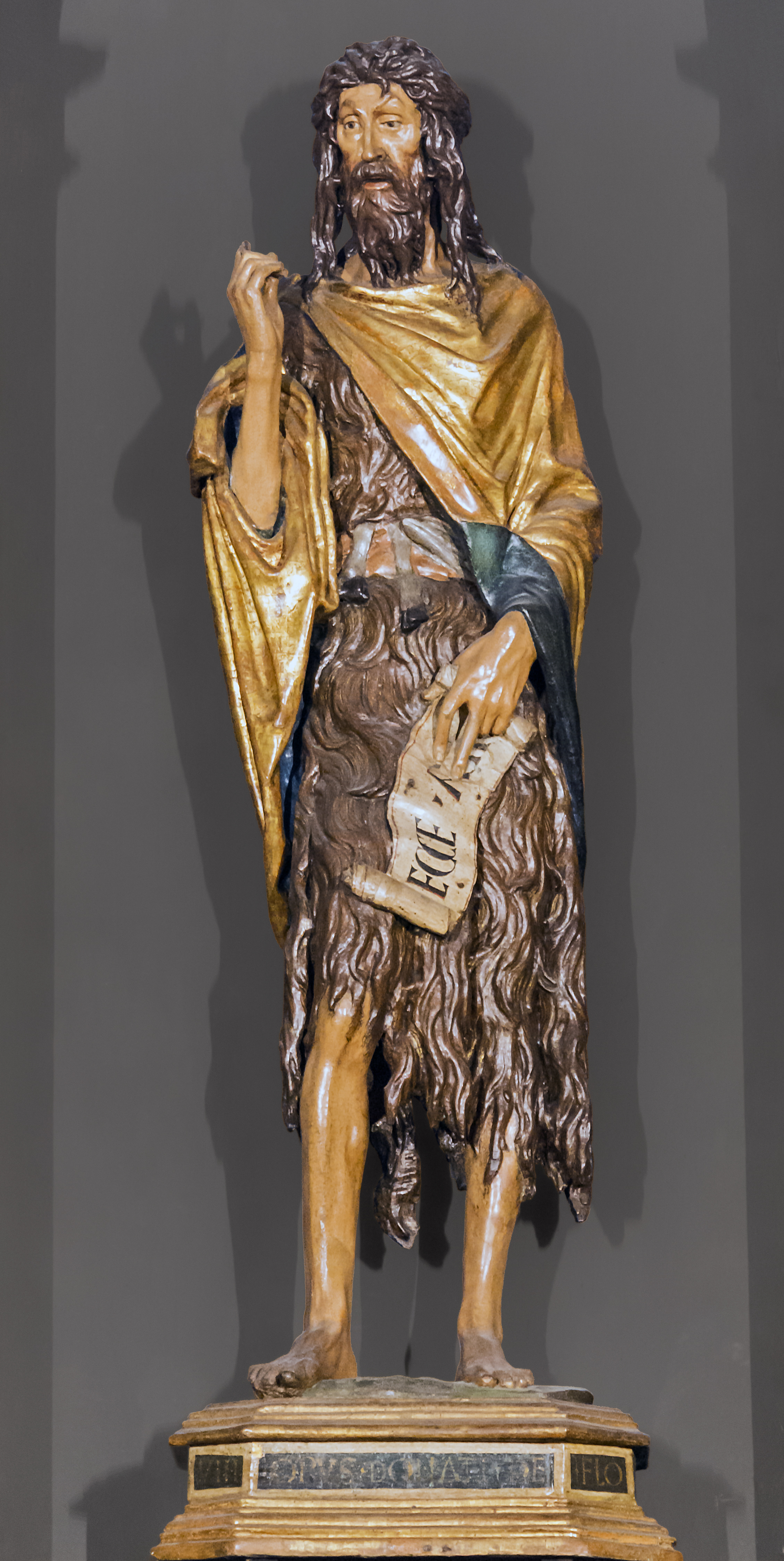
Donatello, St. John the Baptist

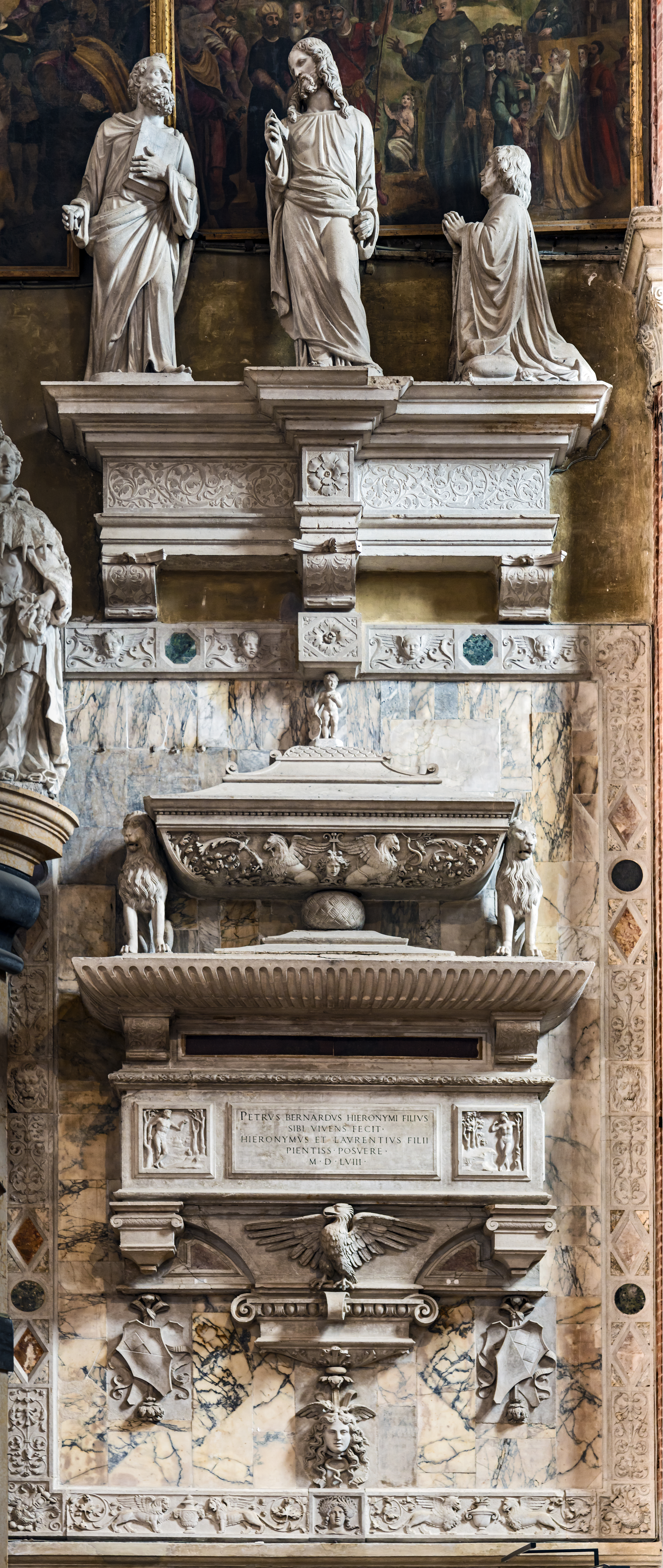
Tullio Lombardo, tomb of Pietro Bernardo

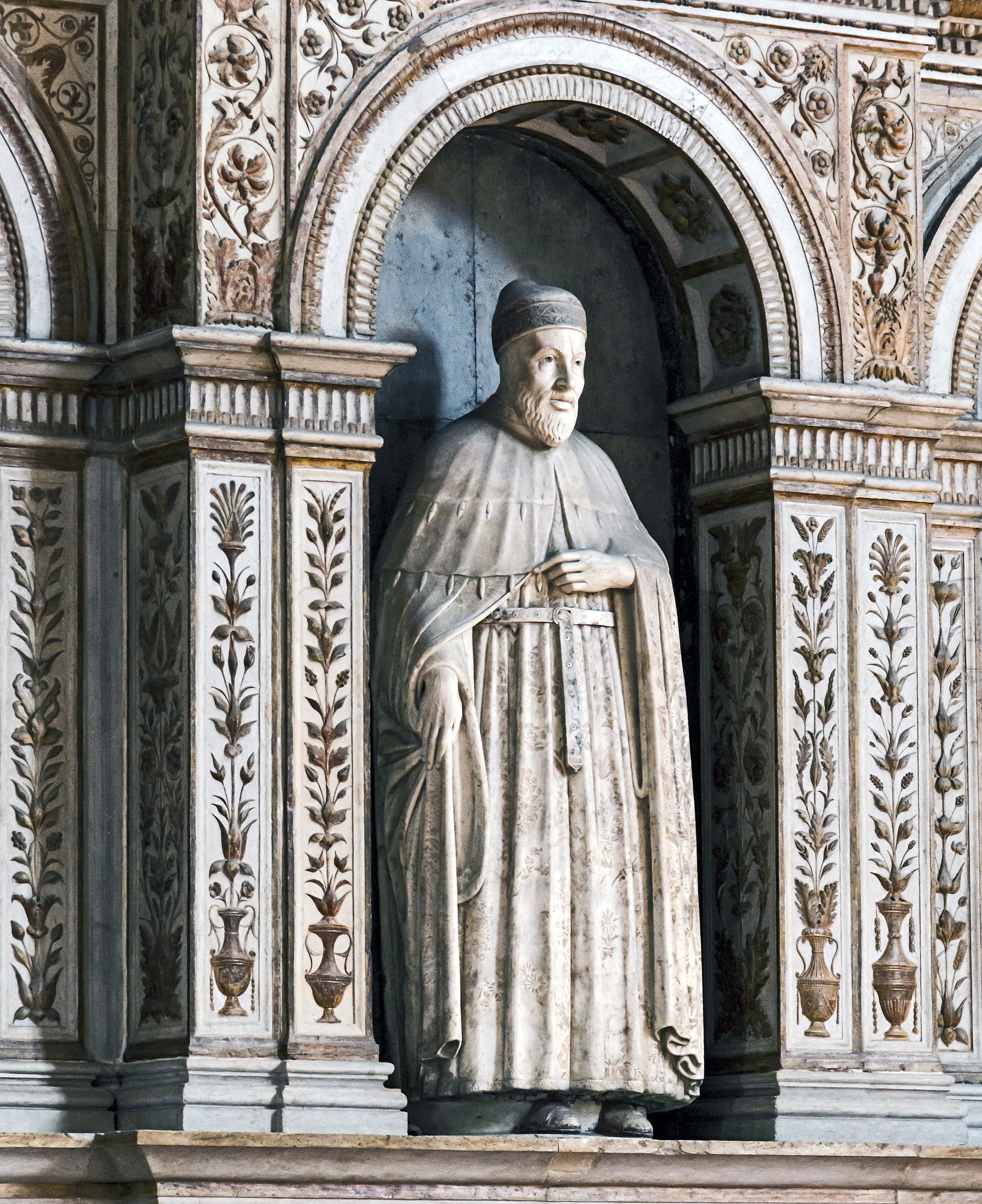
Antonio Rizzo, tomb of Doge Niccolò Tron

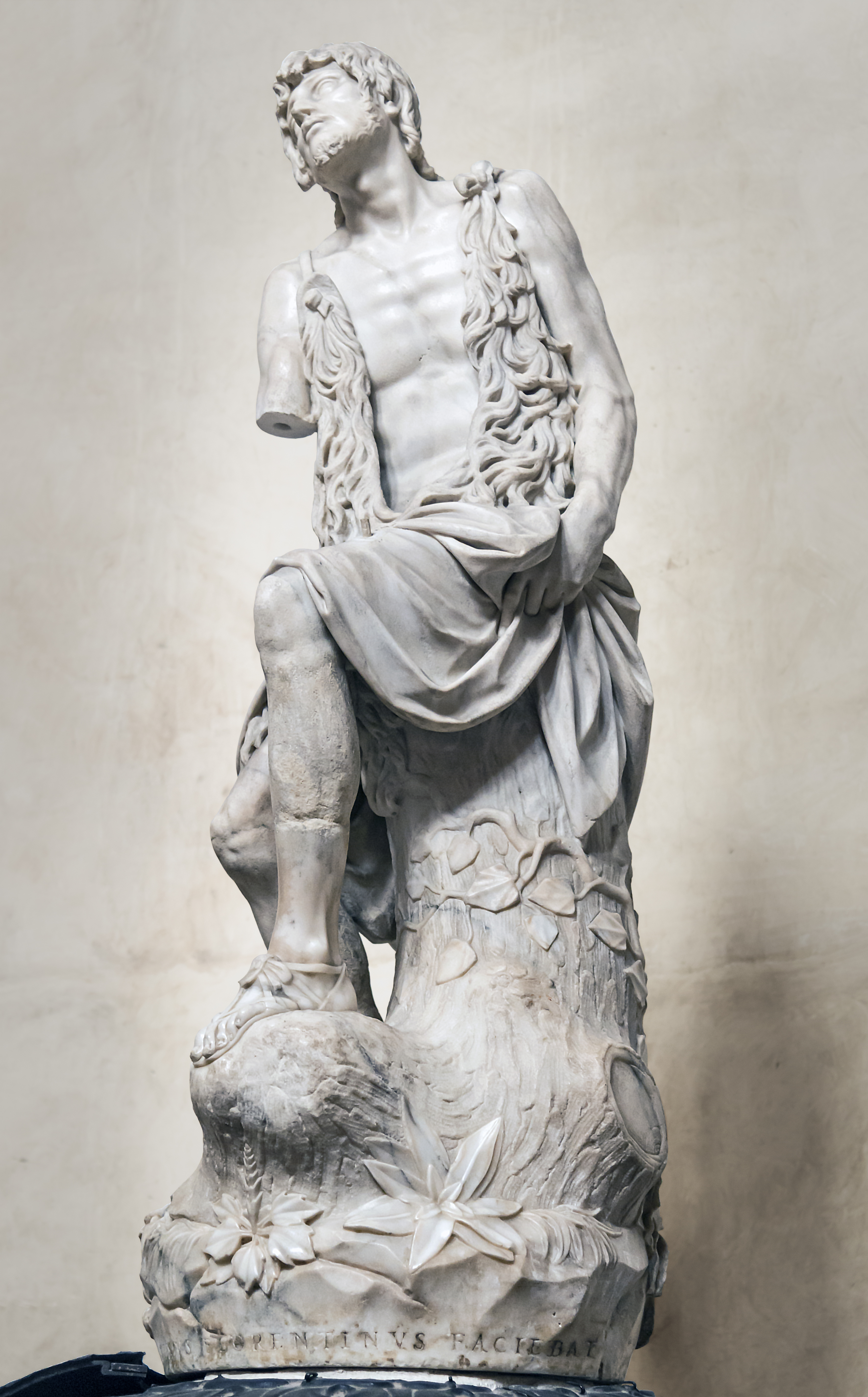
Jacopo Sansovino, St. John the Baptist

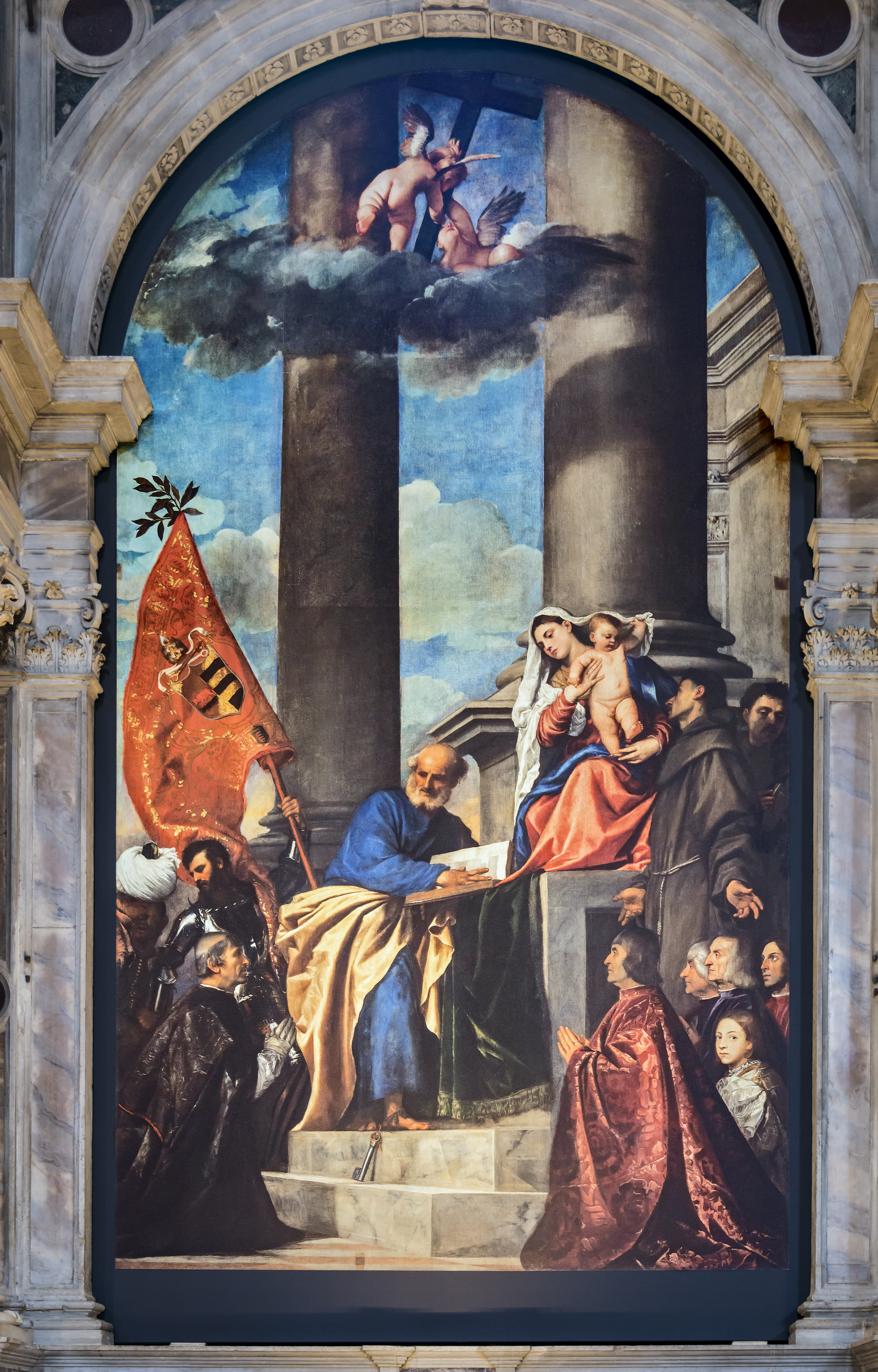
Pesaro Madonna by Titian

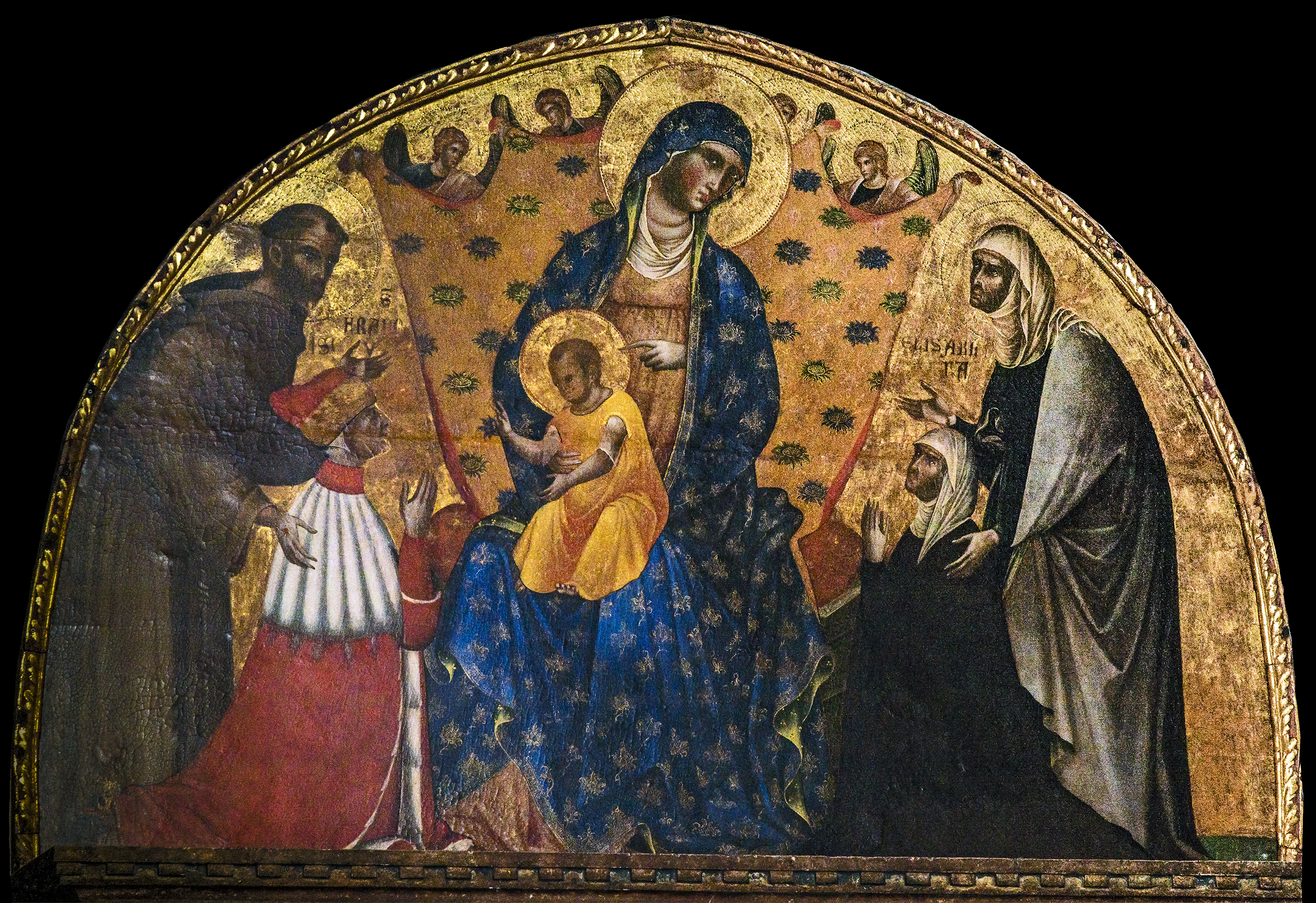
Paolo Veneziano, Doge Francesco Dandolo and His Wife Presented to the Virgin by Ss. Francis and Elizabeth

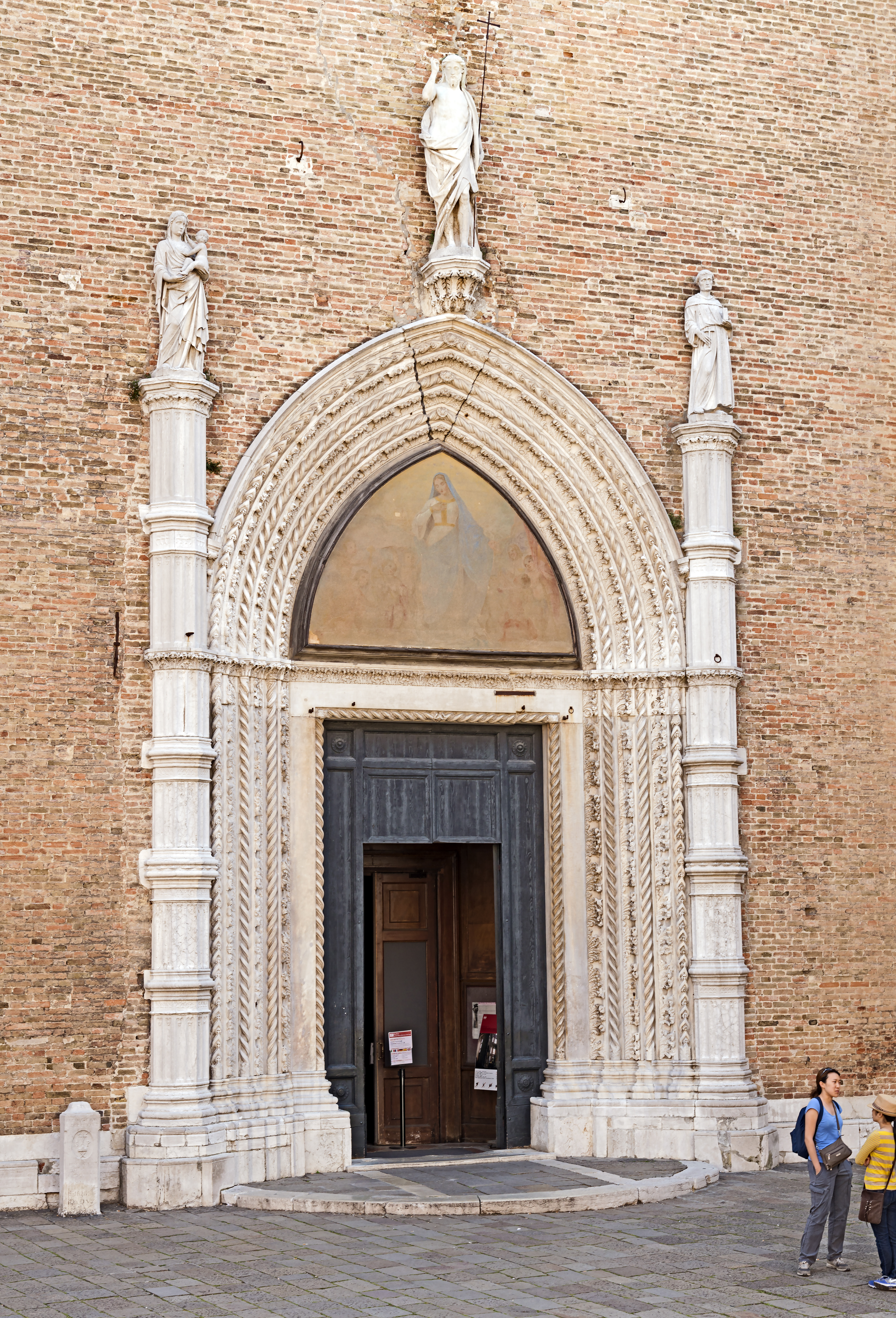
Alessandro Vittoria The Risen Christ

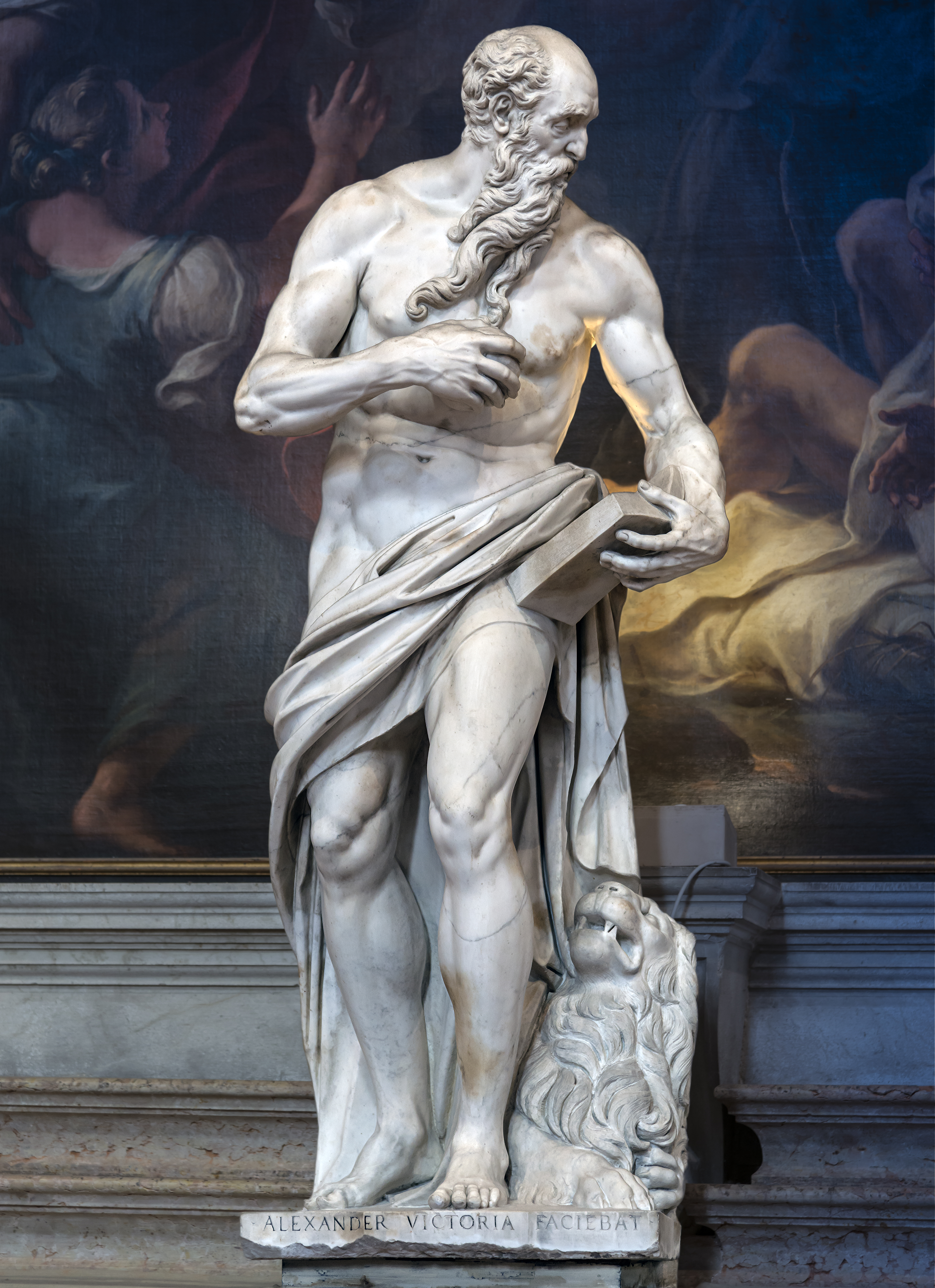
Alessandro Vittoria St. Jerome

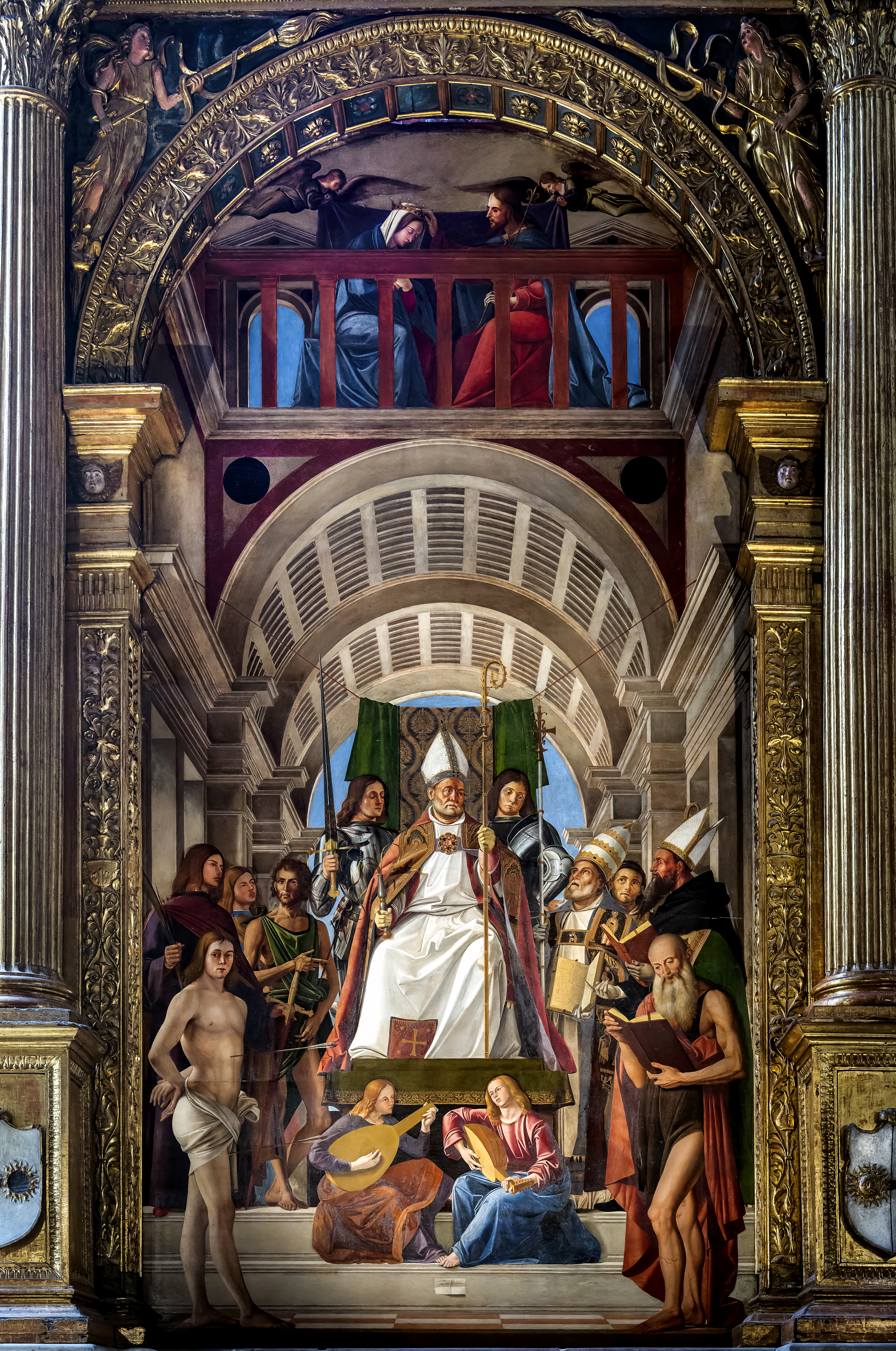
Alvise Vivarini St. Ambrose and other Saints

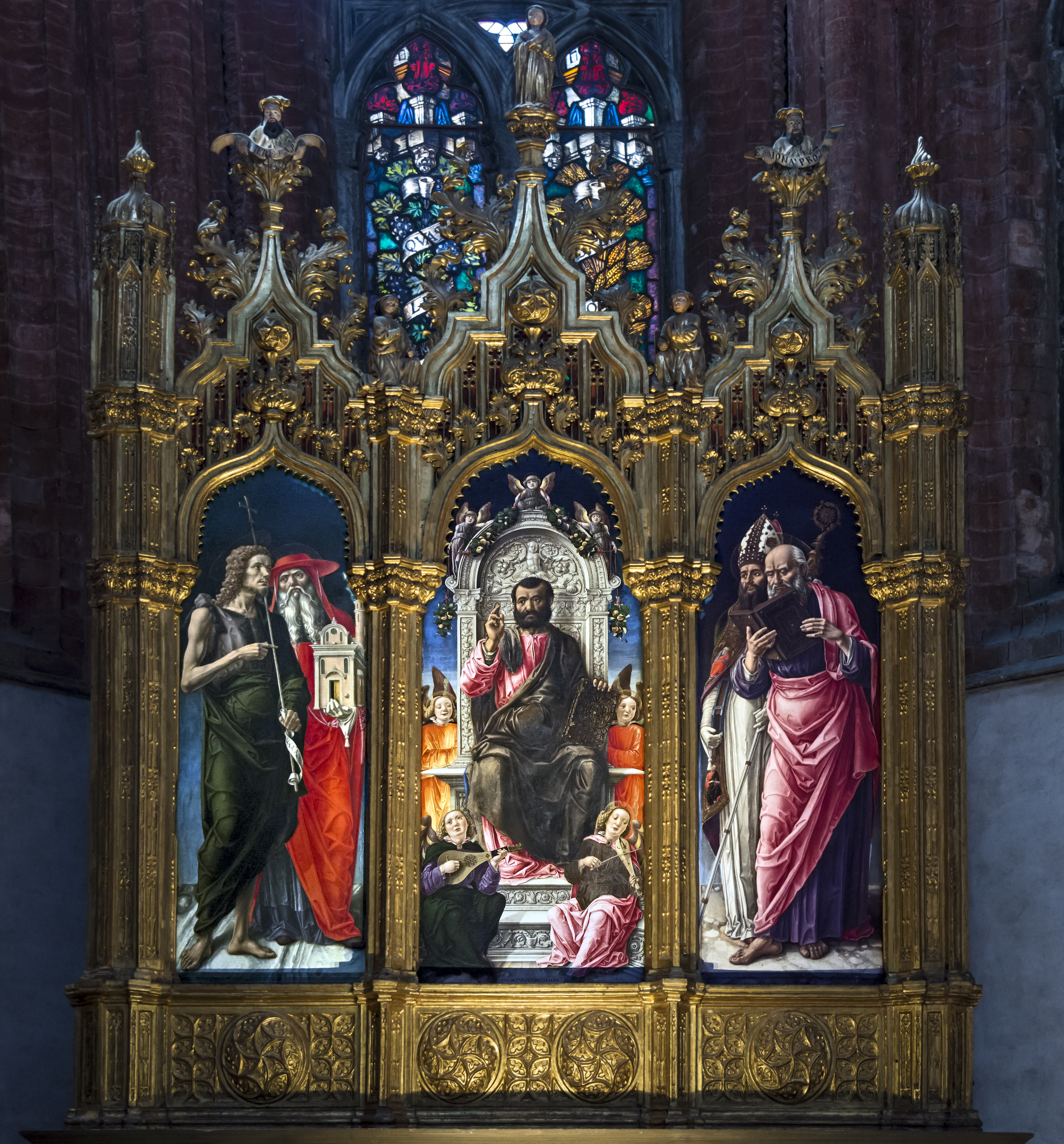
Bartolomeo Vivarini St. Mark Enthroned

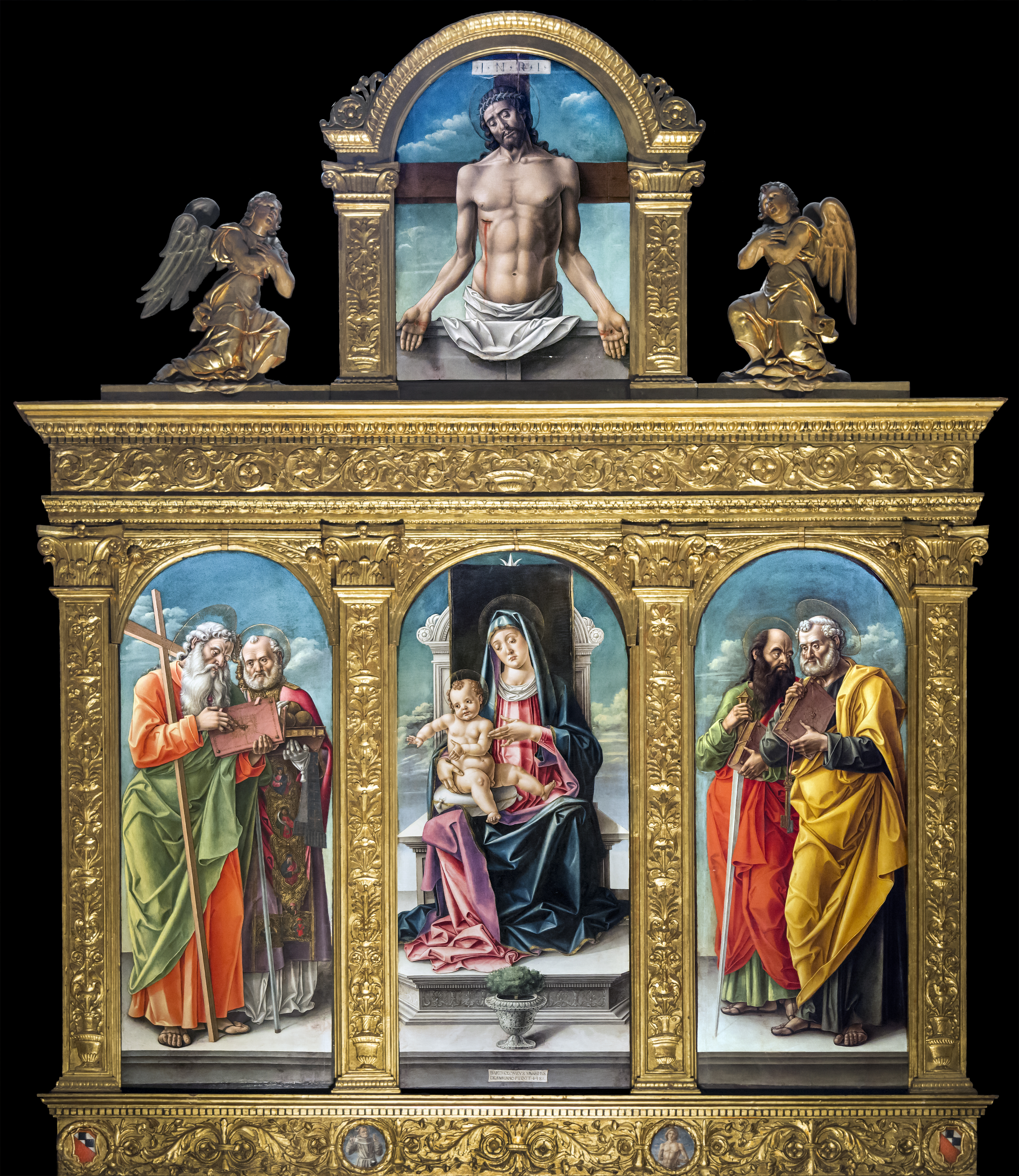
Bartolomeo Vivarini Madonna and Child with Saints

== Funerary monuments ==
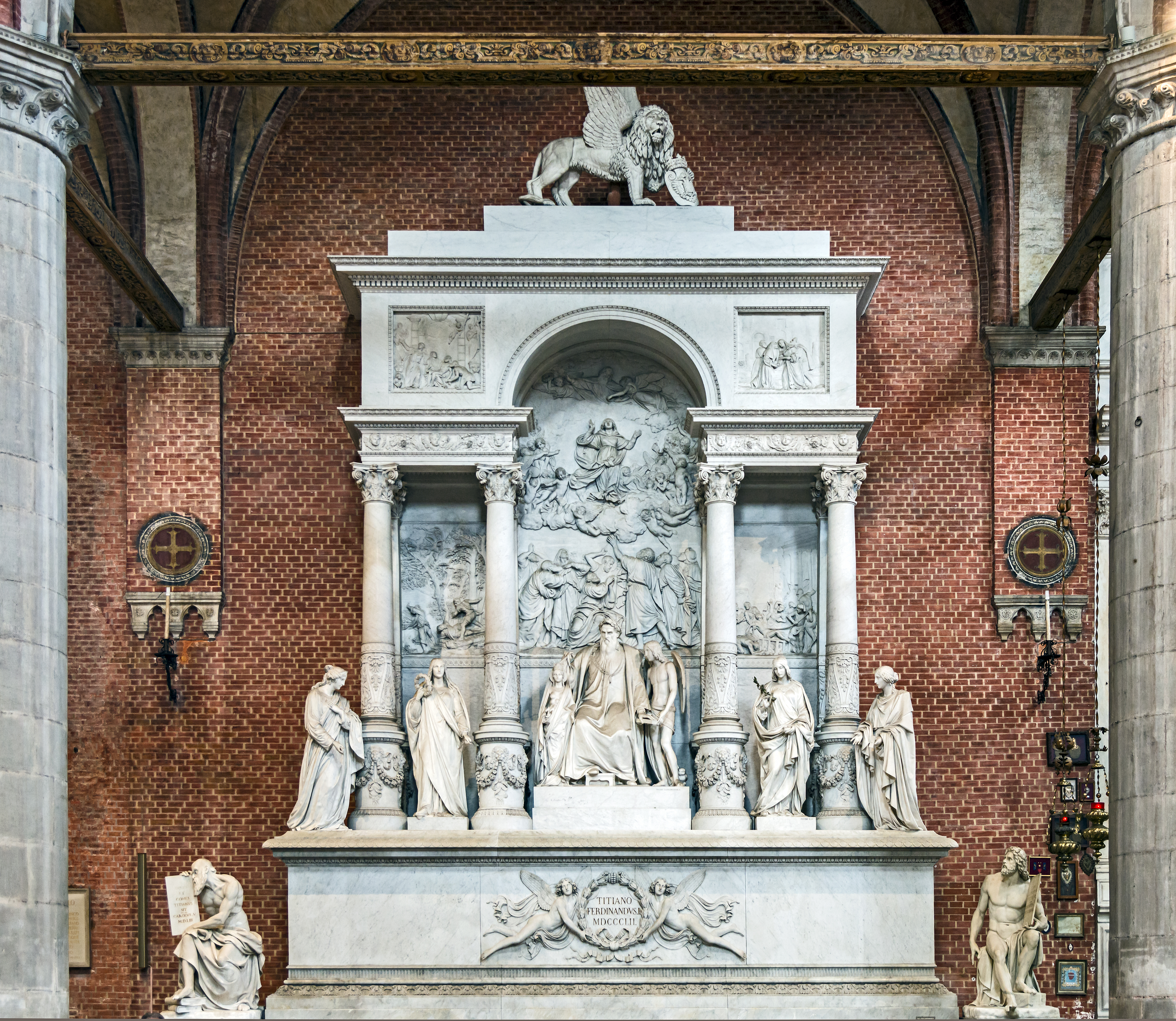
Monument of Titian

- Francesco Barbaro (1390–1454) (humanist and senator)
- Pietro Bernardo (d. 1538) (senator)
- Antonio Canova (only his heart is buried here; the tomb, realised by his disciples, is based on the drawing by Canova for an unrealised tomb for Titian)
- Federico Cornaro
- Doge Francesco Dandolo (in the chapter house)
- Doge Francesco Foscari (d. 1457)
- Jacopo Marcello
- Claudio Monteverdi (one of the greatest composers of the 17th century, Chapel of the Milanese )
- Beato Pacifico (founder of the current church)
- Alvise Pasqualigo (d. 1528) (Procurator of Venice)
- Benedetto Pésaro (d. 1503) (general)
- Doge Giovanni Pesaro
- Bishop Jacopo Pésaro (d. 1547)
- Paolo Savelli (condottiere) (the first Venetian monument to include an equestrian statue)
- Titian (d. 1576) (Renaissance painter)
- Melchiorre Trevisan (d. 1500) (general)
- Doge Niccolò Tron
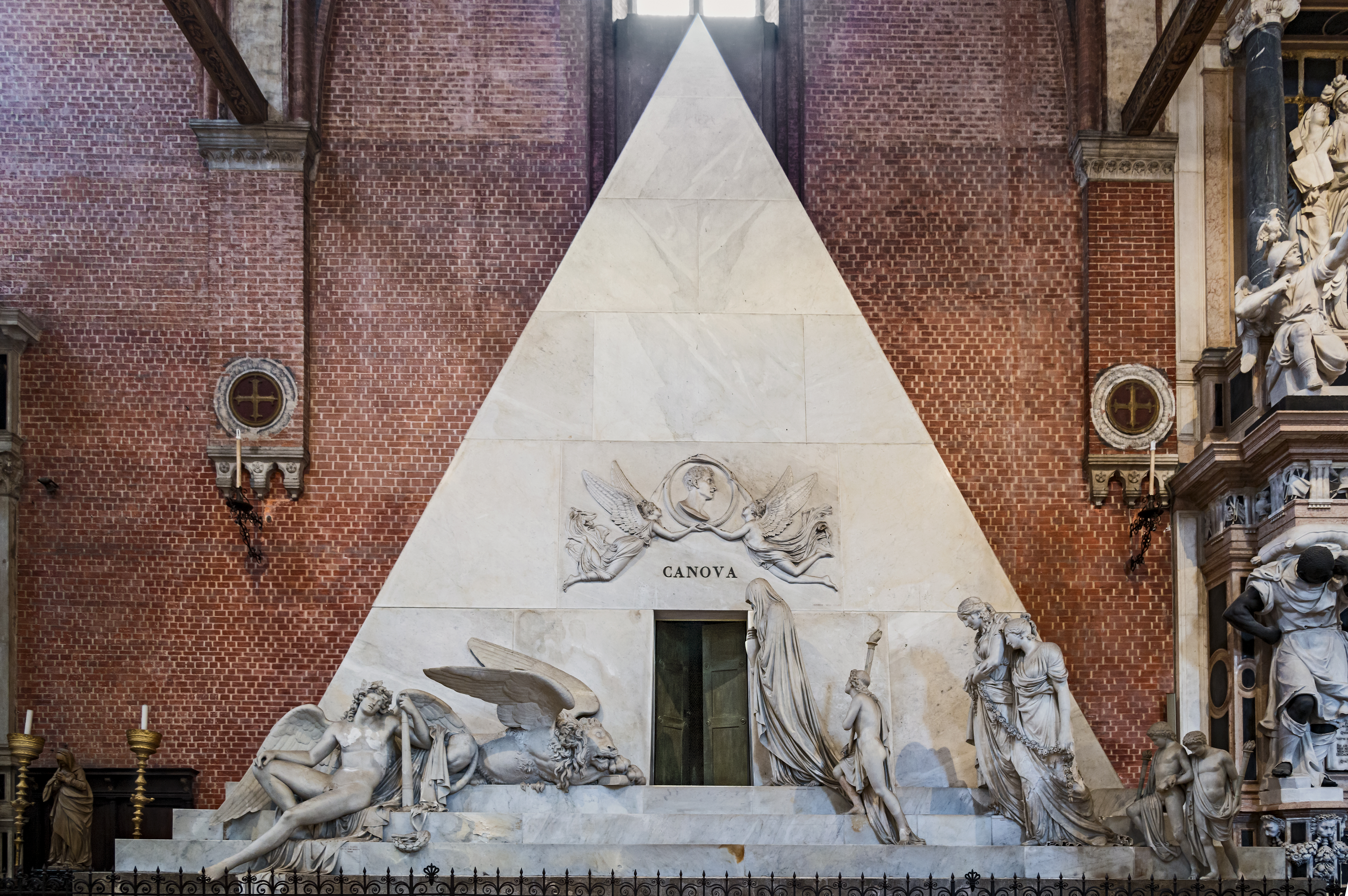
Monument to Antonio Canova

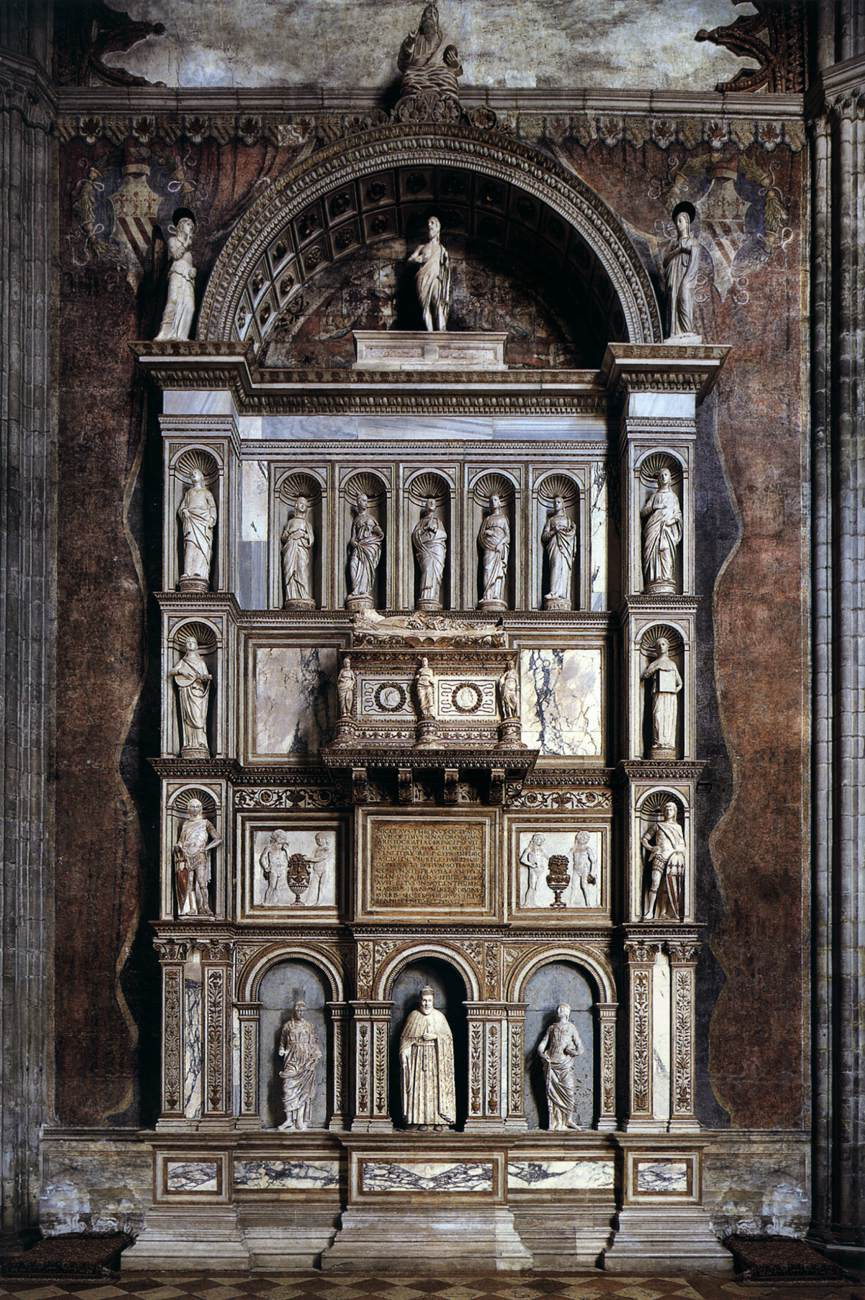
Monumento to Doge Niccolò Tron

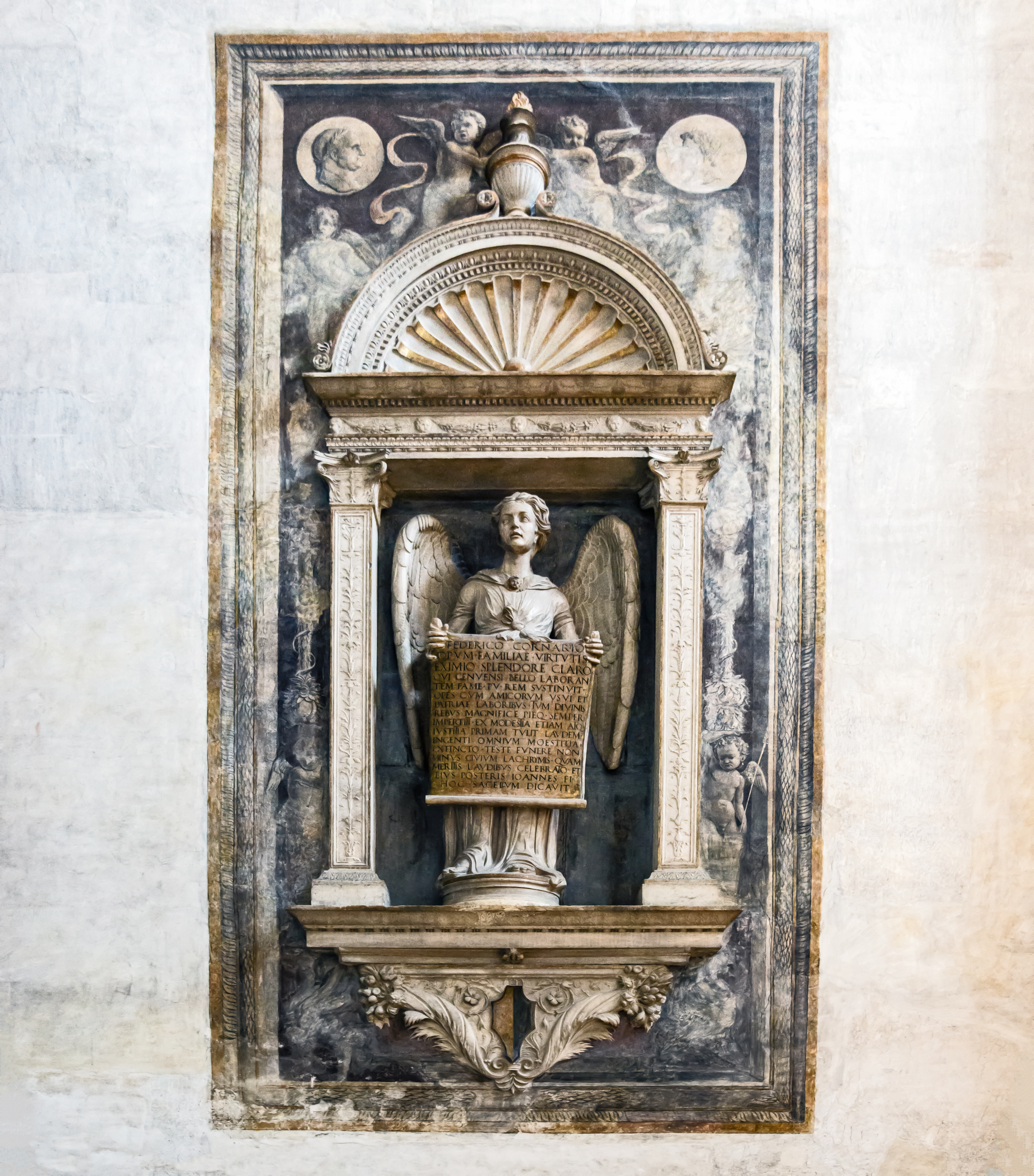
Monument to Federico Cornaro

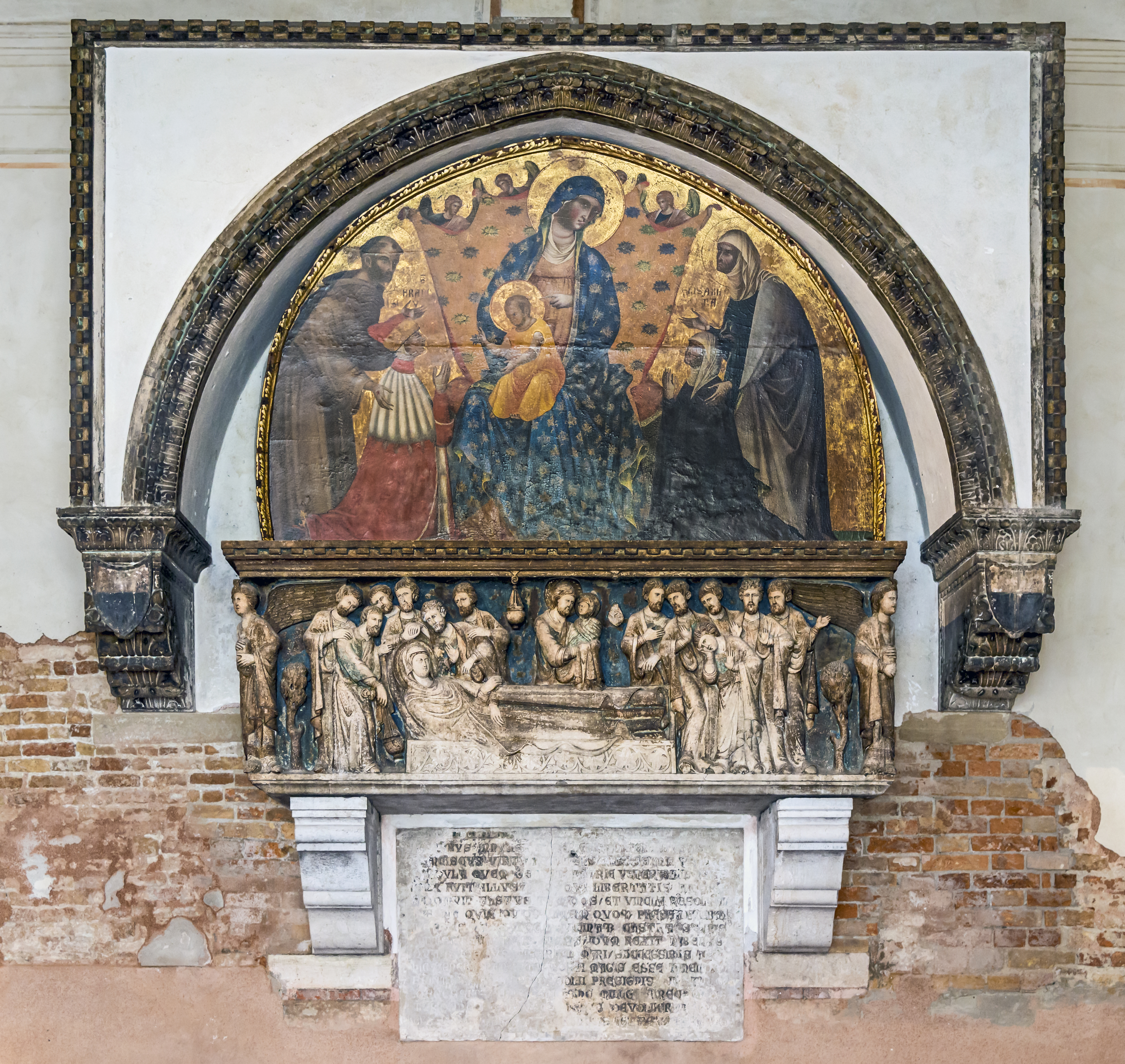
Monumento to Doge Francesco Dandolo

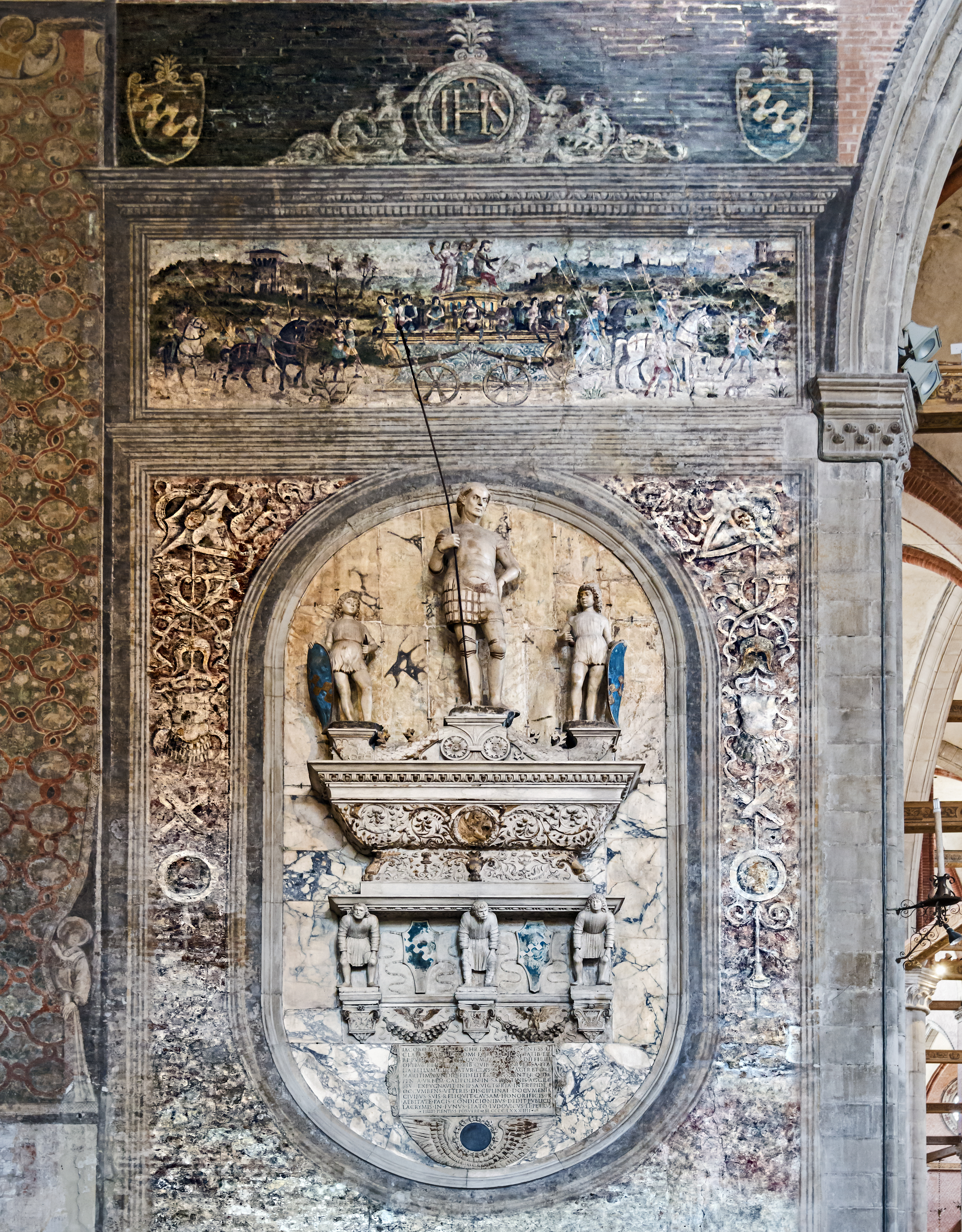
Monument to Jacopo Marcello

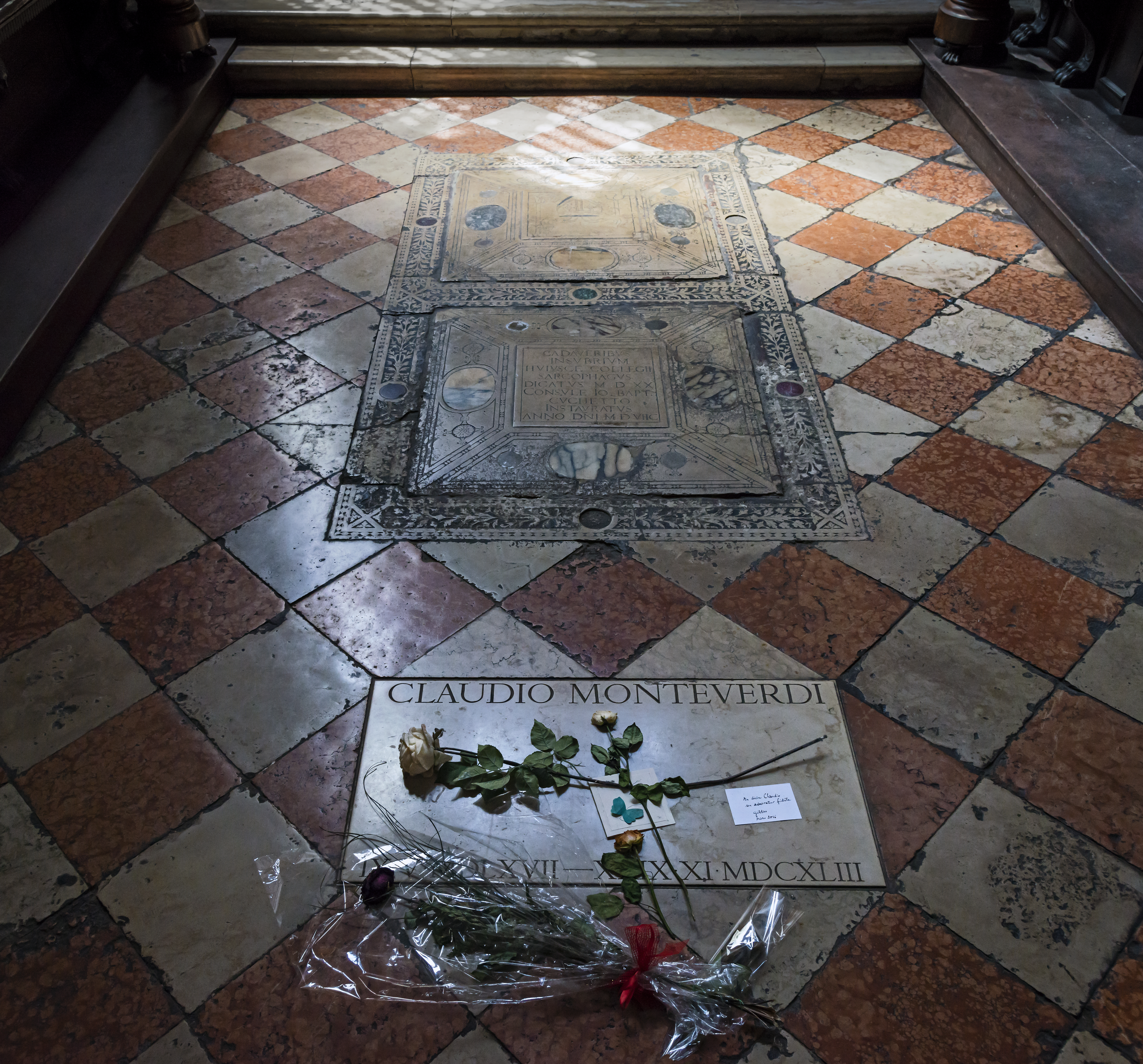
Tomb of Claudio Monteverdi

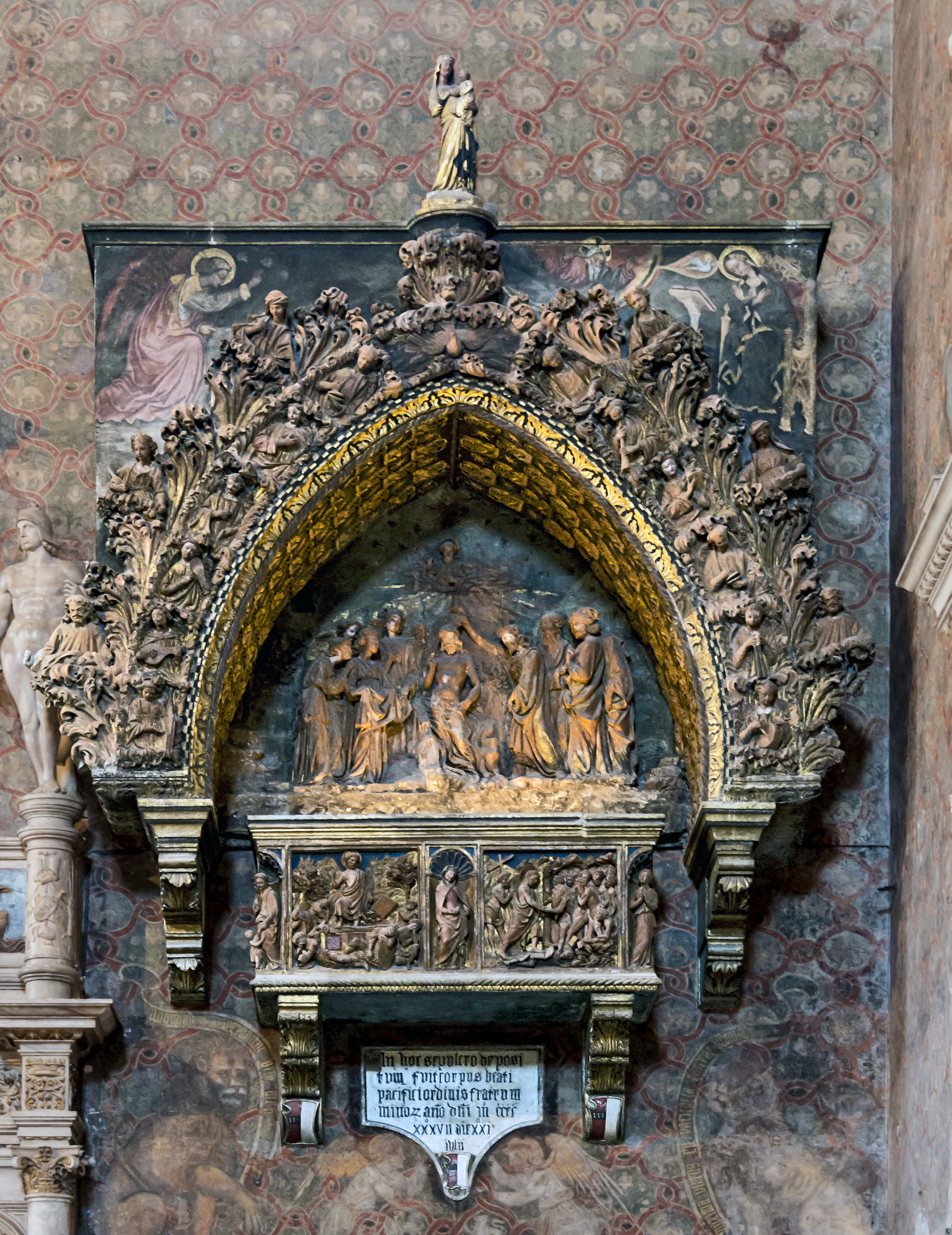
Monument to Blessed Pacifico

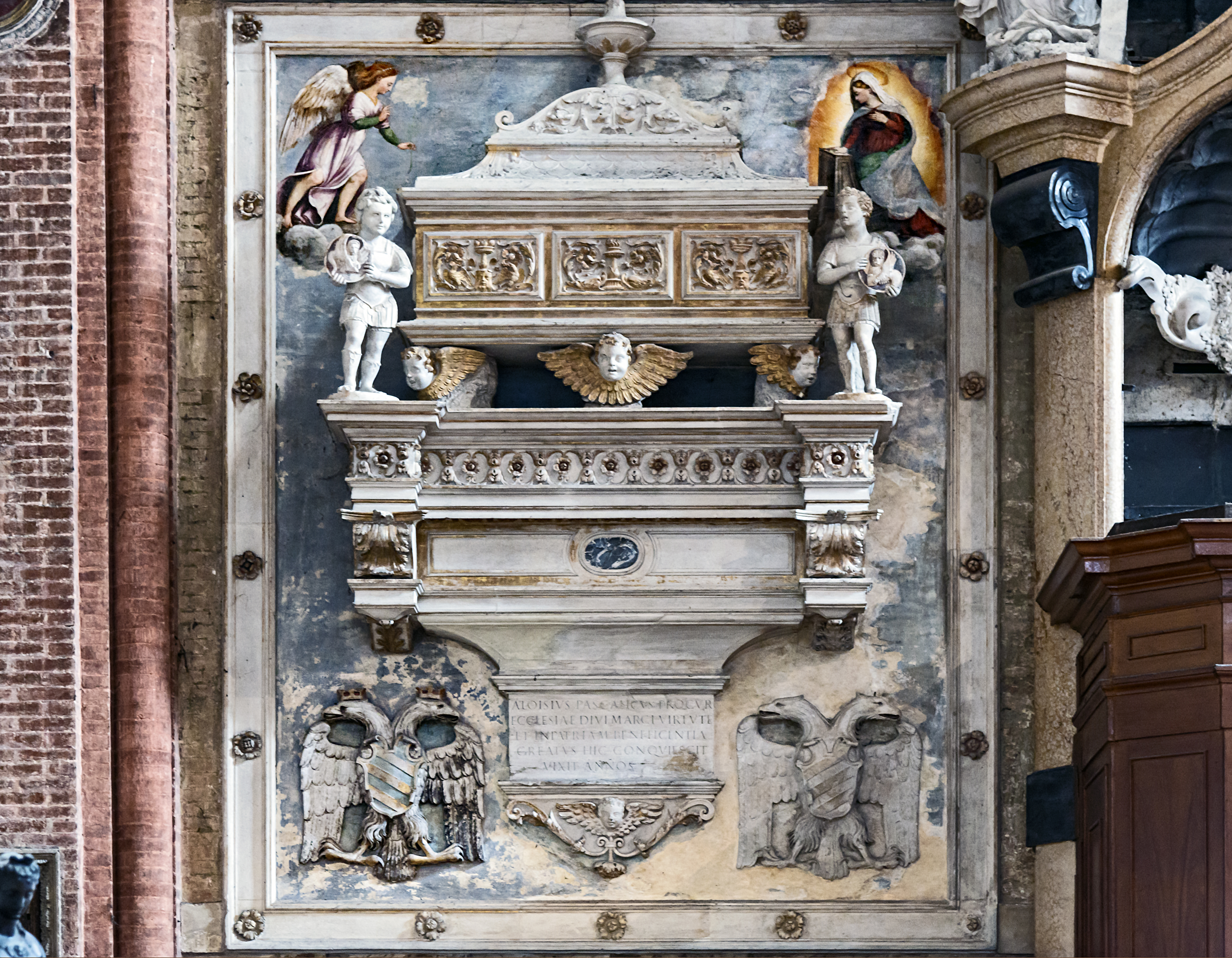
Monument to Alvise Pasqualigo

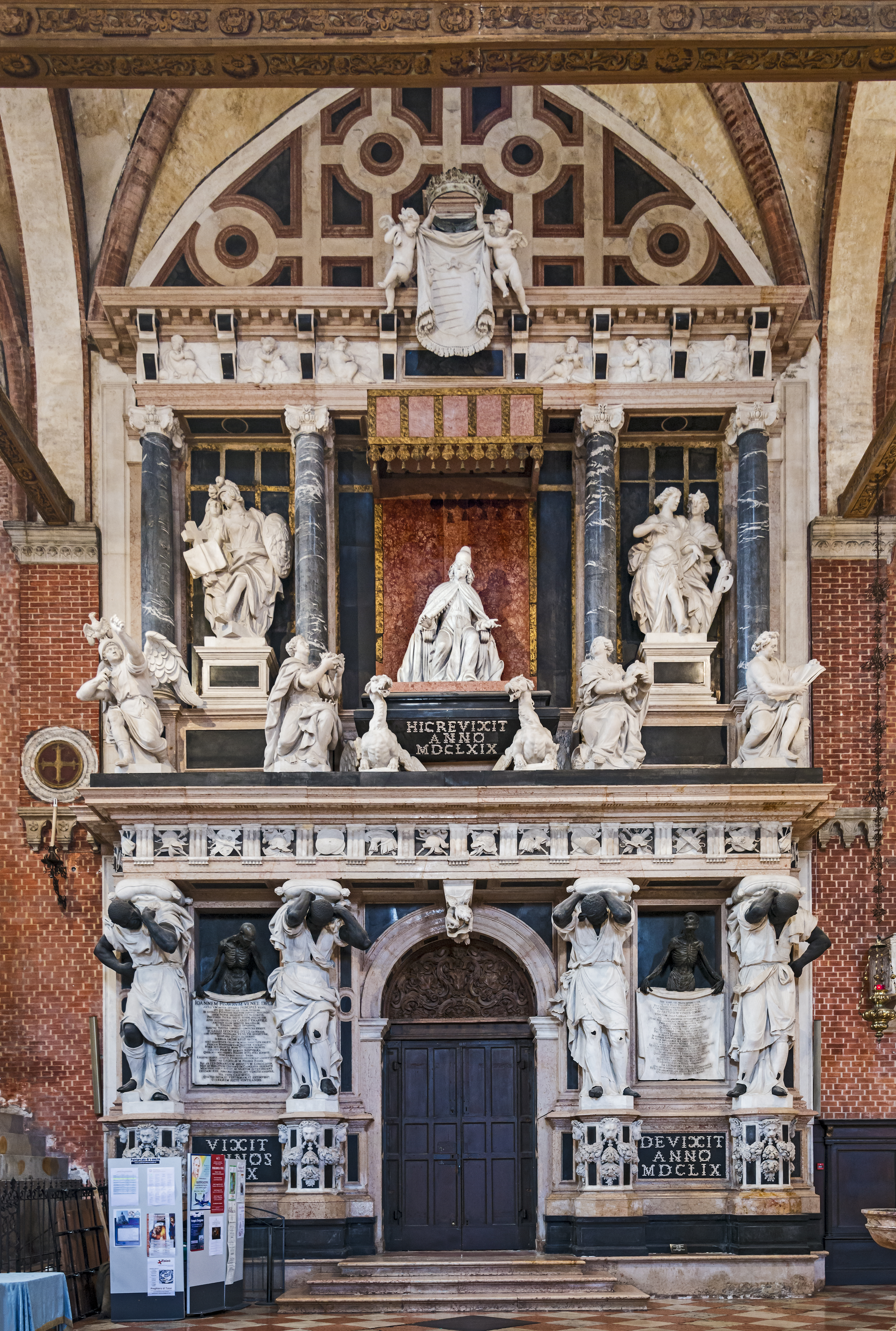
Monument to Doge Giovanni Pesaro

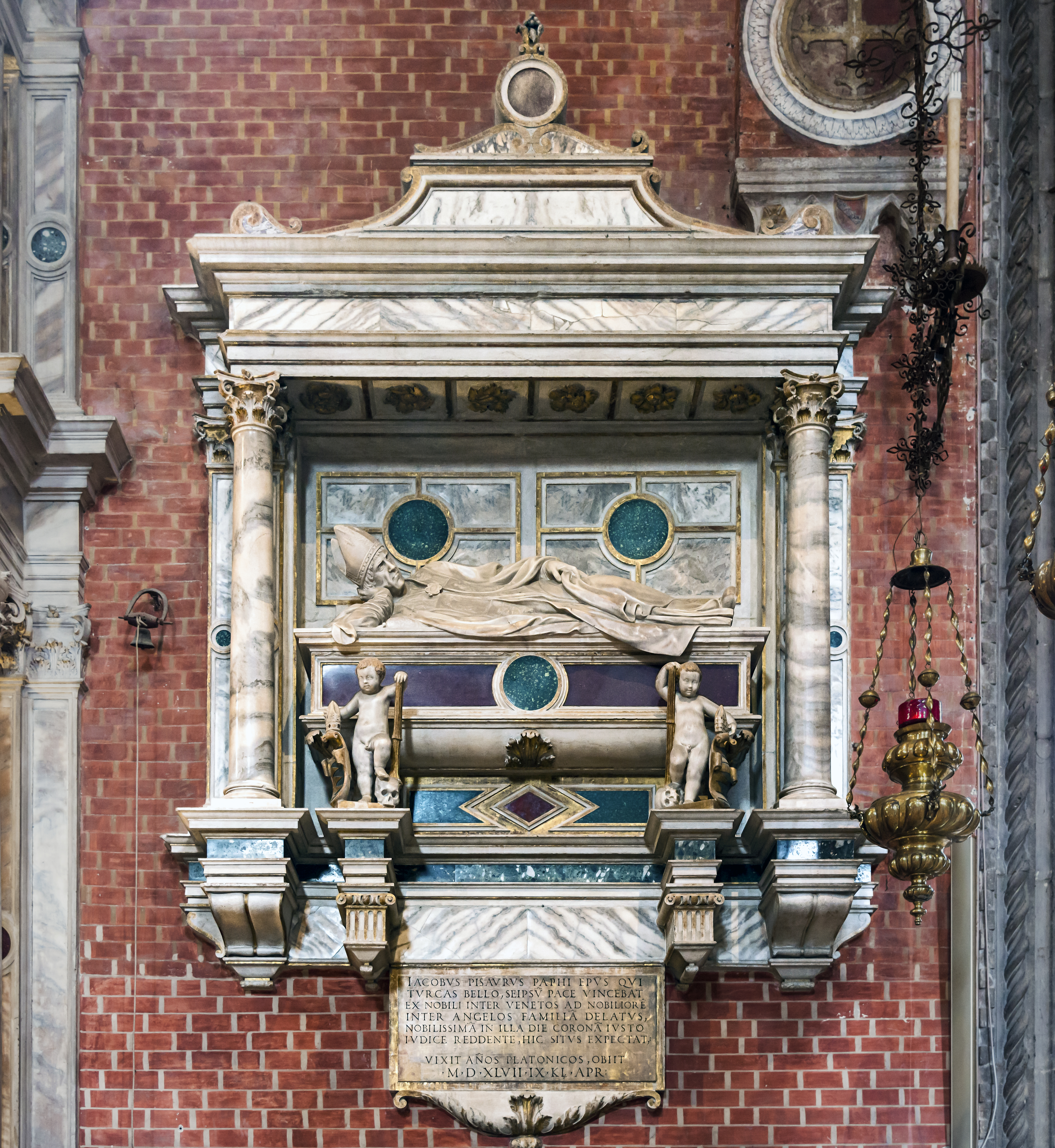
Monument to Jacopo Pesaro

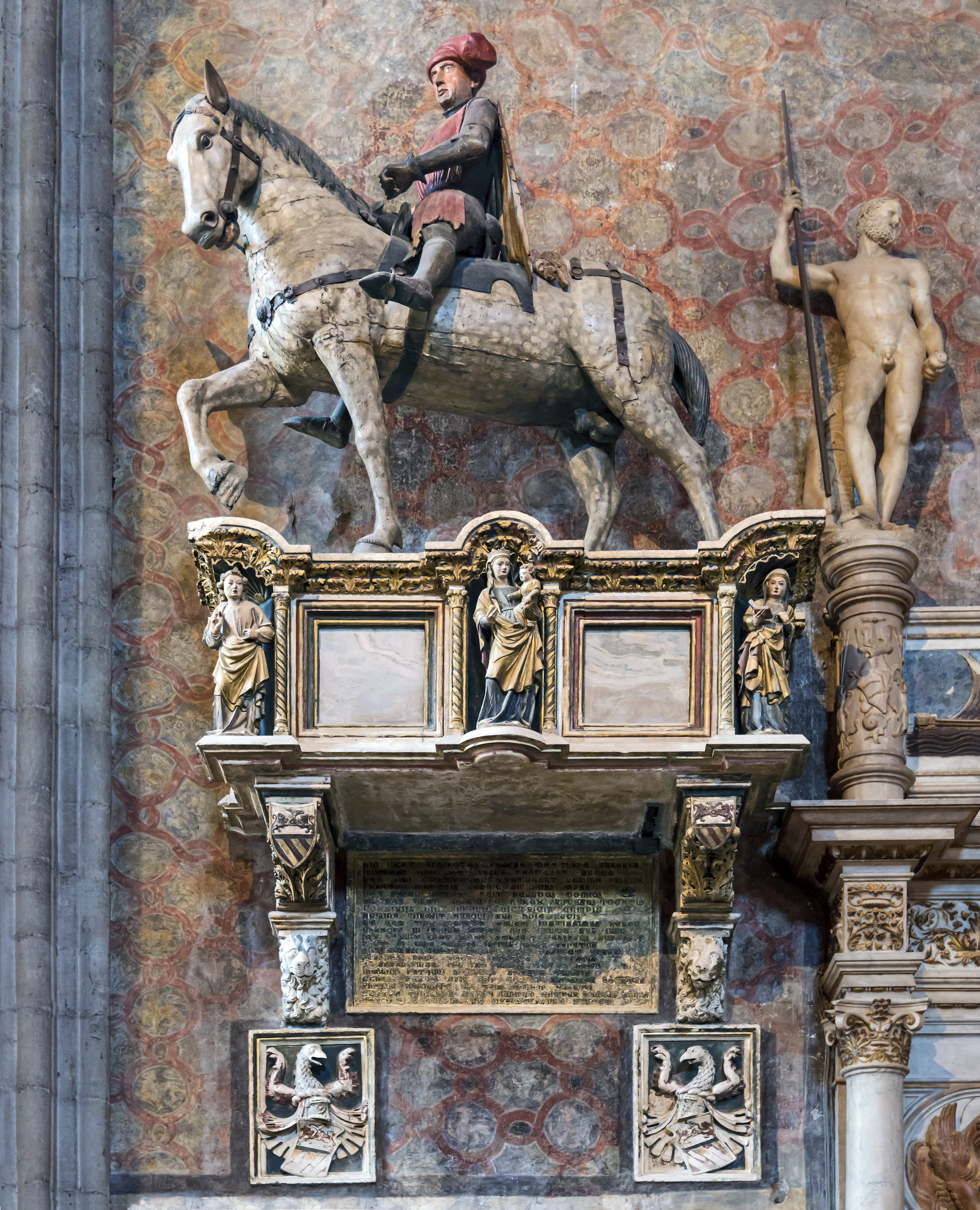
Monument to Paolo Savelli

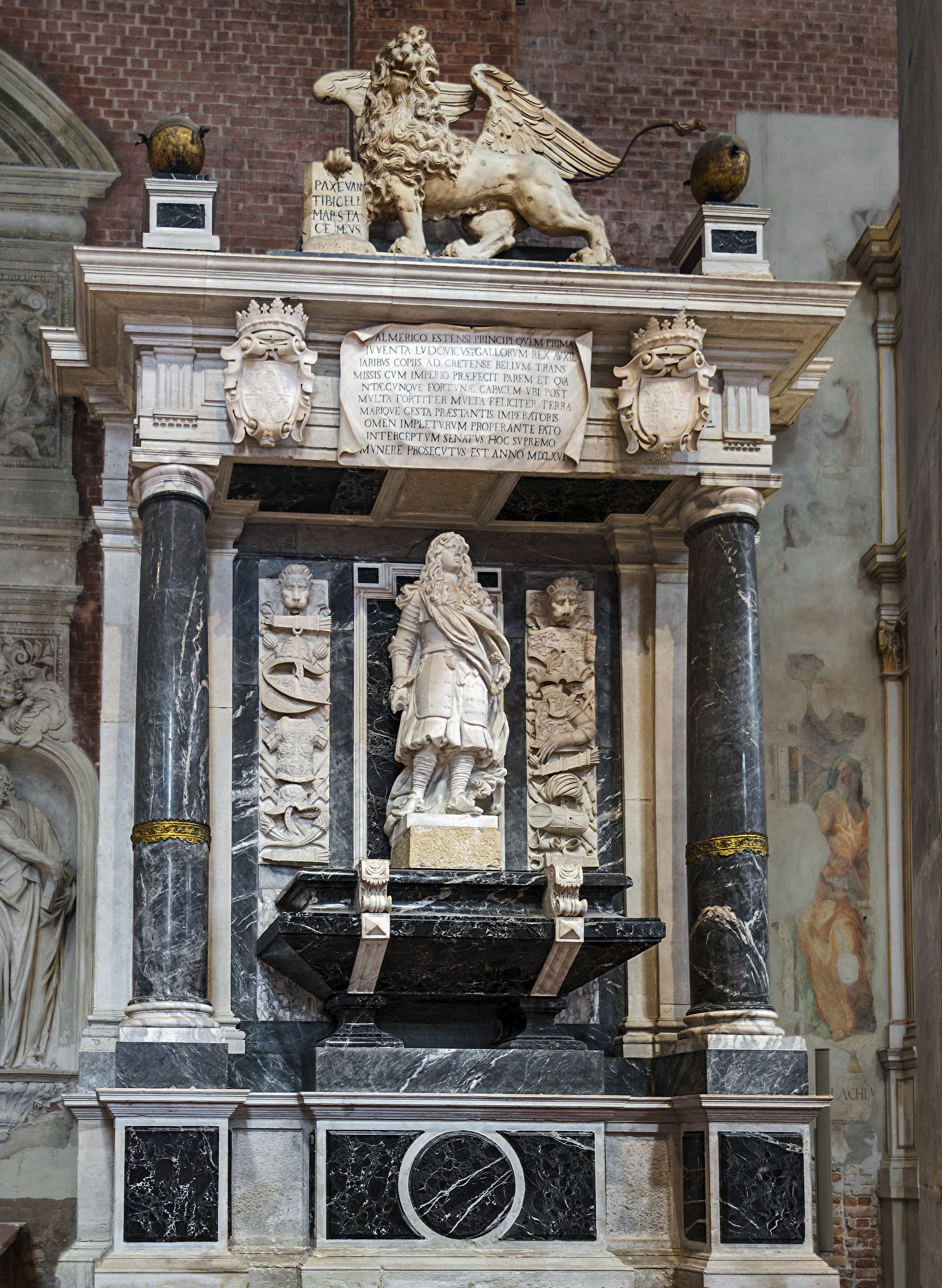
Monument to Almerico d'Este

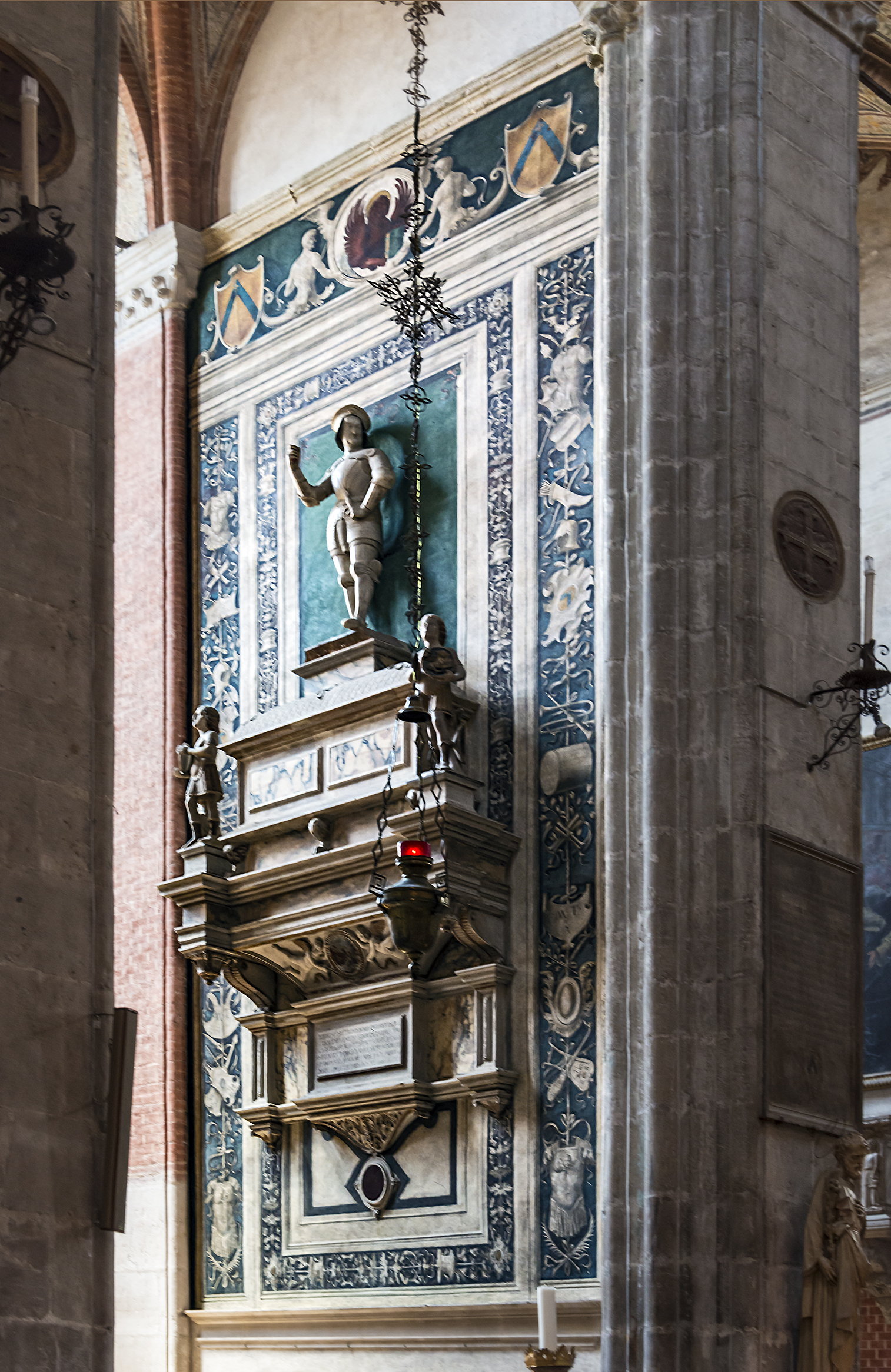
Monument to Melchiorre Trevisan

== Pipe organs ==
=== History ===
The first historical information about organs in the Frari basilica dates back to the fifteenth century. In 1483, a chronicle of the convent refers to the existence of a "perfectum" organ. In service for more than thirty years ranging approximately from 1593 at least until 1629. Girolamo Diruta (1586-1589) and Giovanni Picchi are among the most famous organists of the basilica during that period.

An engraving depicting the choir of the basilica made by Father Vincenzo Coronelli in 1708, shows that the basilica then had two organs on the perimeter wall of the choir that were facing one another and placed sideways on the choir stalls.

The left organ was probably built by Giovan Battista Piaggia in 1732, this instrument could therefore be one of his first works. The activity, known up to now, of this Venetian organ builder extends, in fact, from 1740 to 1760, the organ he built for the Venetian church of San Giovanni Evangelista dates back to that date and has remained almost unchanged; the latter therefore served as a term of comparison to validate the attribution of that of the Frari and, above all, to allow its reconstruction in 1970. In fact, after Gaetano Callido had built the front organ (1795), this instrument was progressively abandoned, so as to reach the early seventies almost completely stripped of the metal rods.

The organ on the right was built by Gaetano Callido in 1795 or 1796. Almost uninterrupted documentation from then until the early decades of the twentieth century provides information confirming that, unlike the other organ in the pair, this instrument was entrusted to qualified organ builders for ordinary maintenance and, from time to time, the organ on the right was restored with substantial respect for its authenticity.

Problems regarding restoration of the two ancient organs was faced in 1969. Following construction of new organ with electropneumatic transmission (1928) by Mascioni, an organ located in the apse close to Titian's Assumption, use of the Callido organ decreased so much over time that between 1929 and 1969 there were no maintenance interventions on the original pared organs.

The restoration of the pared organs was unequal. Given the good condition of conservation and integrity of the right organ, an intervention of extraordinary maintenance was all that was needed. While a more radical intervention was needed for the left organ that called for a reconstruction in the strictest sense, since there were seven façade pipes, all the internal mechanics, nine wooden pipes, and a bellows were missing. For this reconstruction all the surviving elements were used and, on the basis of these, also making comparisons with the organ of San Giovanni Evangelista, the measures of the pipes were established.

The restoration made it possible to appreciate again the round and robust sounds of the Callido organ and the transparent and delicate timbre of the Piaggia organ, closer to Renaissance sound models. Eventually, the instruments were tuned in unison, in order to be played together. After more than thirty years, a new revision work was promoted, which was completed in the months of April and May 2004.

Thanks to the availability of two organs placed on two opposing choirs that was typical of a musical style in vogue in Venice in the sixteenth and seventeenth centuries, the practice of the double choir is restored in the basilica of the Frari. It is the last surviving example in Venice - and one of the rare examples in Italy - of two choirs with functioning historical organs.

=== Piaggia organ ===
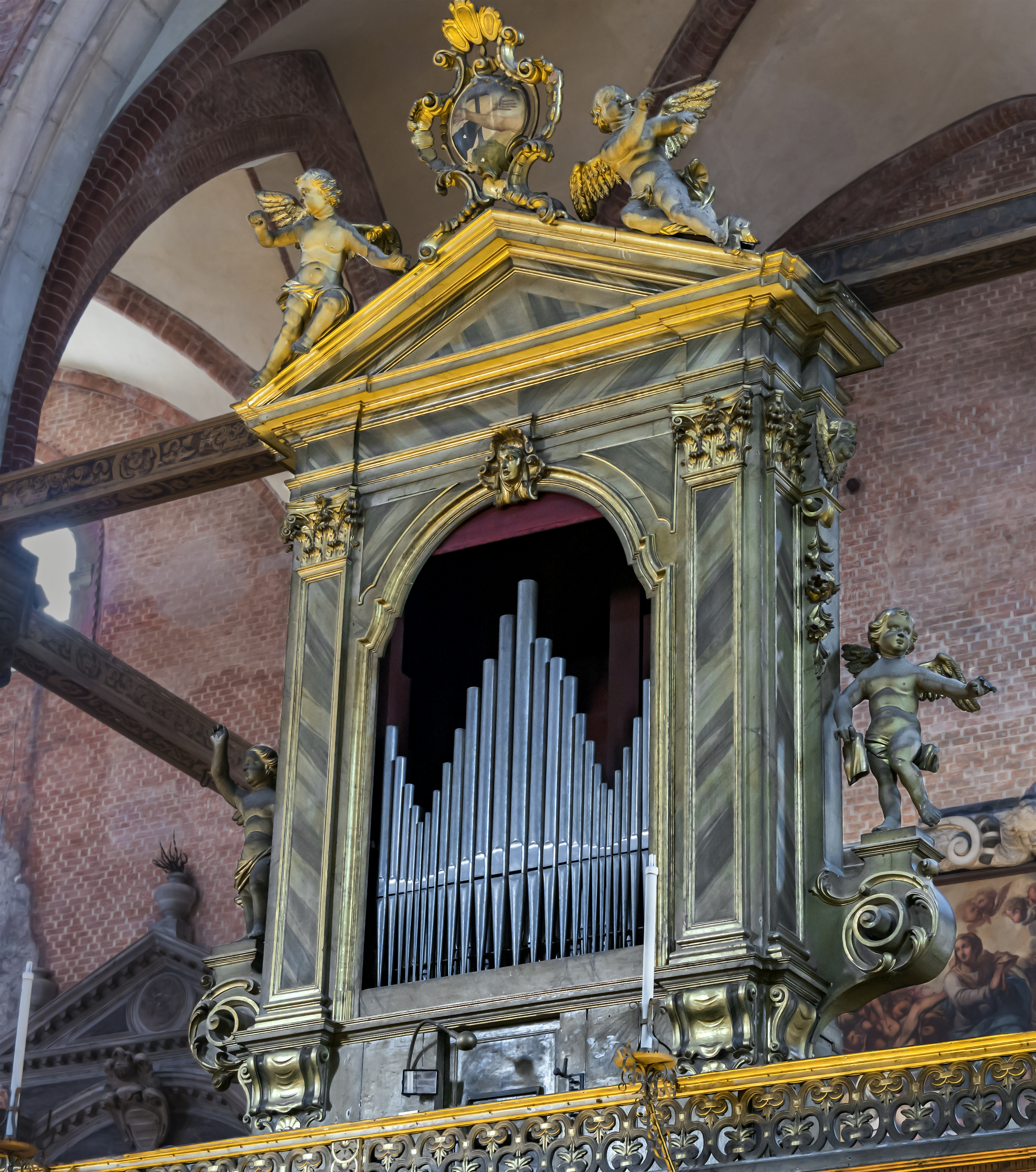
The left organ by Piaggia

The organ of the left choir was built by Giovan Battista Piaggia. It features an original integral mechanical transmission, has a single keyboard of 45 notes with a first octave scavezza (C1-C5), and a pedalboard of 13 (C1-E2) with a first octave scavezza, constantly combined with the manual. The exhibition consists of 21 pipes, belonging to the main register and forming a single cusp with side wings and with aligned shield mouths. The phonic arrangement, based on the position of the knob tie rods of the various stops in a column of the register (whose handwritten tags are original), is as follows:

- Main 8 '
- Octave
- Tenth Fifth
- Tenth Ninth
- Second Vigesima
- Vigesima Sixth
- Vigesima Nona
- Human Voice
- Twelfth flute
- Handset
- Double basses 16 '(always inserted)

=== Callido organ ===
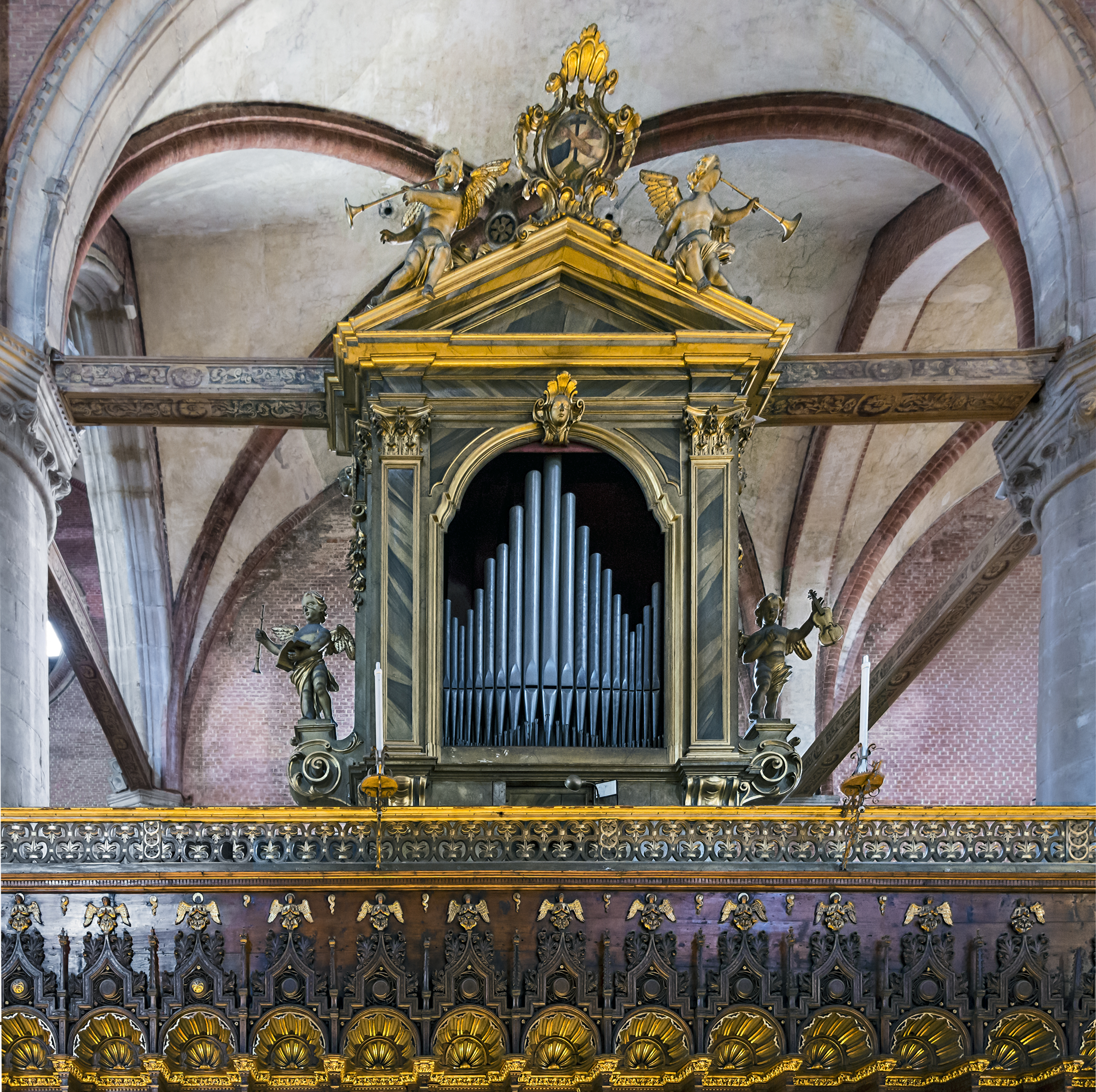
Right organ by Callido

The organ of the right choir is the pipe organ built by Gaetano Callido. It has an original integral mechanical transmission. It has a single 47-note keyboard with first octave scavezza (C1-D5) and a 17 + 1 pedalboard (C1-G # 2 + Rollante pedal) with first octave scavezza, constantly combined with the manual. The exhibition consists of 21 pipes, belonging to the main register and forming a single cusp with lateral wings and with aligned miter mouths, at the foot of which the tromboncini are housed.

=== Mascioni organ ===
The basilica also housed the Mascioni opus 398 pipe organ, built in 1928. It was placed behind the Assunta altarpiece of the main altar. It was electrically driven, had three keyboards of 61 notes each (C1-C6), and a pedalboard of 30 (C1-F3).

It was the largest organ in Venice, the only one with three manuals from the Cecilian period. It was the only instrument that allowed the performance of concerts with a repertoire that could range from the Romantic to the contemporary period.

Despite the transformation of the transmission from pneumatic to electric, the organ preserved all the pipes (about 2000), the bellows, and the wind chests (with the exception of that of the third manual that was destroyed by high water during the restoration of the Pala Assunta in the 1960s), and the beautiful wooden console table, with its original ivory keys.

In 2018, the organ, fully functional and active in liturgies and concerts, was disassembled to allow the complete restoration of the altarpiece and the frame of the painting of the Assumption, with no idea of where to place it at the end of the restoration of the painting. In 1965 it had already been dismantled to allow the restoration of the altarpiece in a previous intervention, once restored, the organ had been rebuilt in 1977, many parts were destroyed, including the wind chest of the 3rd manual, but many other patios were resumed and reassembled because they were missing, some registers from the same period also made by Mascioni. The patient work was performed by Maestro Alessandro Girotto. The completed organ was inaugurated with a concert by the concert master Sergio De Pieri, then organist of the basilica.

The Mascioni organ now has been donated to the parish church of Santa Maria Ausiliatrice in Lido di Jesolo (Venice) with extensive plans for it to be mounted. Restorations and tampering by the Zanin di Codroipo company that are necessary to adapt the organ for use in a different location, however, will leave the city of Venice without its only romantic-symphonic concert instrument.

== See also ==
- Italian Gothic architecture
- List of buildings and structures in Venice
- List of churches in Venice

Preceded by Santa Maria della Salute	Venice landmarks Santa Maria Gloriosa dei Frari	Succeeded by Santi Giovanni e Paolo
