= Nicolò Tron (diplomat) =

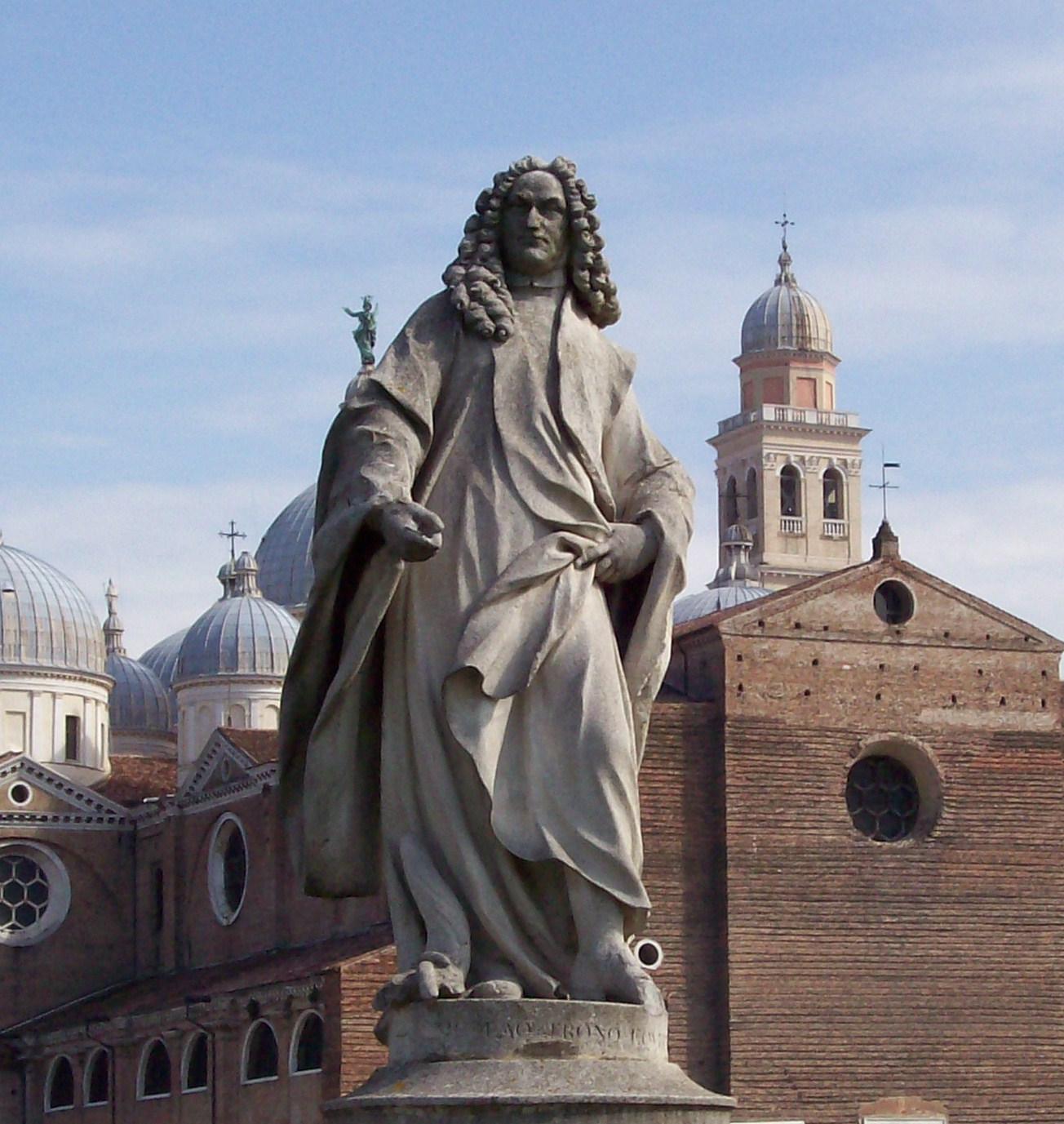
Statue of Nicolò Tron in Prato della Valle, Padua

Nicolò Tron (21 September 1685 – 31 January 1771) was an Italian politician, businessman and agronomist, a citizen of the Republic of Venice.

A Venetian noble, Tron was a young ambassador of the Republic of Venice at the English court; back in Italy, he tried to import the technological and organizational innovations seen abroad, founding the Schio woollen mill, organizing his agricultural estates with modern methods, and activating himself in using his political influence to favour and encourage his own Venetian businesses.

== Life ==
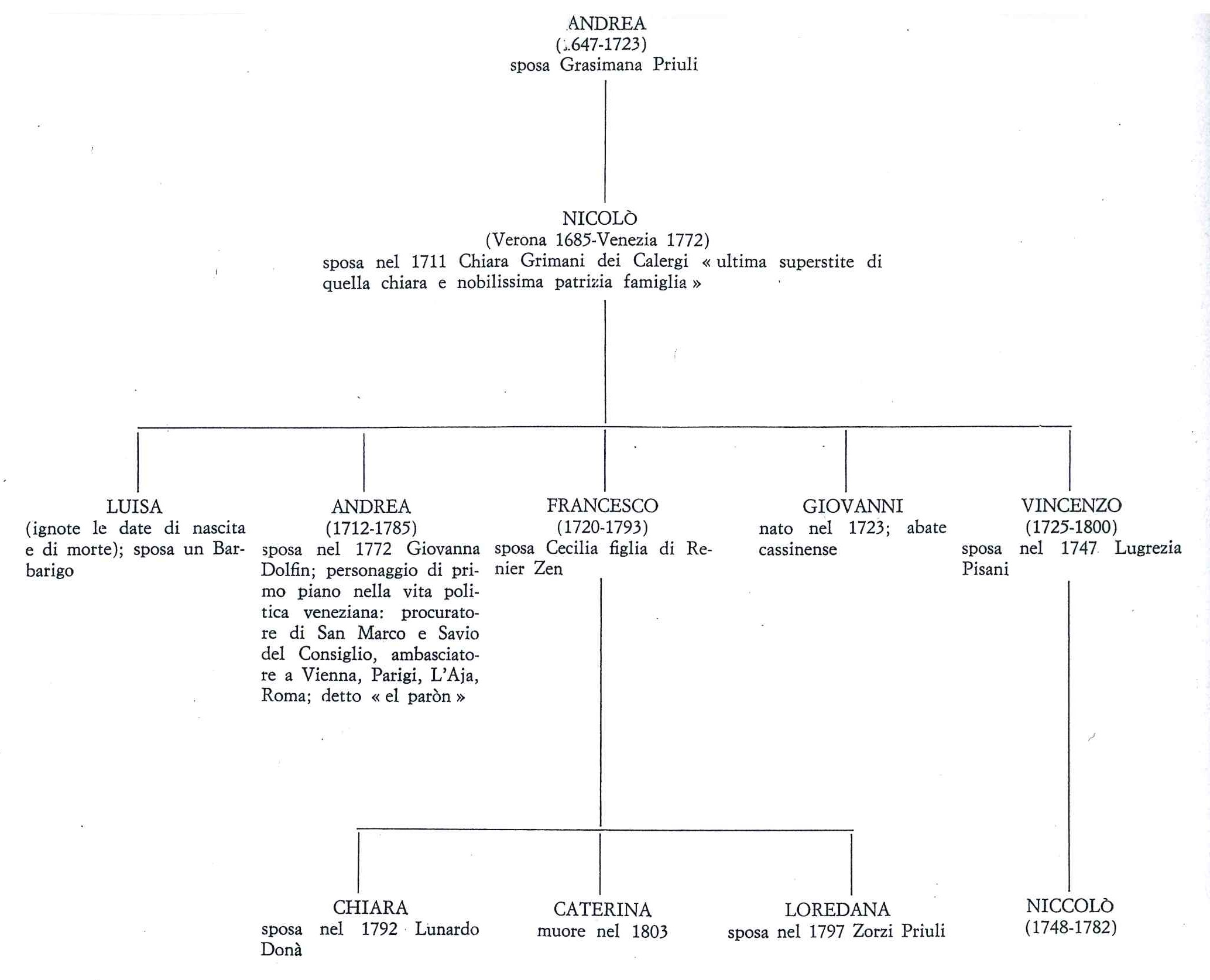
Family tree of Nicolò Tron

He was born in 1685 in Padua from a noble Venetian family, descending from the homonym doge of Venice who had lived two centuries before. He attended the Nobles’ board of Parma and when he was young he began his political career as a Savio agli Ordini, the first senatorial rule which a young patrician could aspire. In 1711 Nicolò married Chiara Grimani of Francesco, one of the most beautiful ladies of the time according to contemporaries. Within a year, at 3 October 1712, she gave him his first-born son Andrea, who in turn would begin a brilliant political career, becoming the so-called "paròn del Senato" ("Master of the Senate").

=== Ambassador in London ===
In the same year, at 10 December, Nicolò Tron was appointed as ambassador to the Court of Queen Anne of Great Britain. The task entrusted to him was to seek support from the British court in the wars that the Serenissima was leading against the Ottoman Empire. Tron came to London one year and half later, in June 1714. In the meantime, Queen Anne was succeeded by George I. To the court environment, however Tron preferred to be associated with scientists and mathematicians, such as Isaac Newton, who appointed him Fellow of the Royal Society, and John Theophilus Desaguliers, a French mathematician and physicist who founded on 14 June 1714 the Grand Lodge, or the modern freemasonry, and entrepreneurs such as Benjamin Berck, a famous panni-lani manufacturer who showed him the most modern techniques used in England for such manufactures. The government of Venice was not particularly pleased about the life their ambassador was conducting, and after sending him some letters recalling his duties, they decided to support him with a sort of lieutenant, a knight Giacomo Querini, whose presence was accepted by Tron without any particular problem.

At the end of his reign, King George awarded Tron with a knighthood in his newly founded Order of St George, but he didn't grant Venice the military support it wanted against the Ottomans: England tended its commercial interests with the Turks, rather than waging war on them; and the ambassador Tron likely had not insisted enough. On the other hand, thanks to the friendship he had established with the Spanish ambassador, Tron obtained from him a contingent of six ships.

=== Return to homeland ===
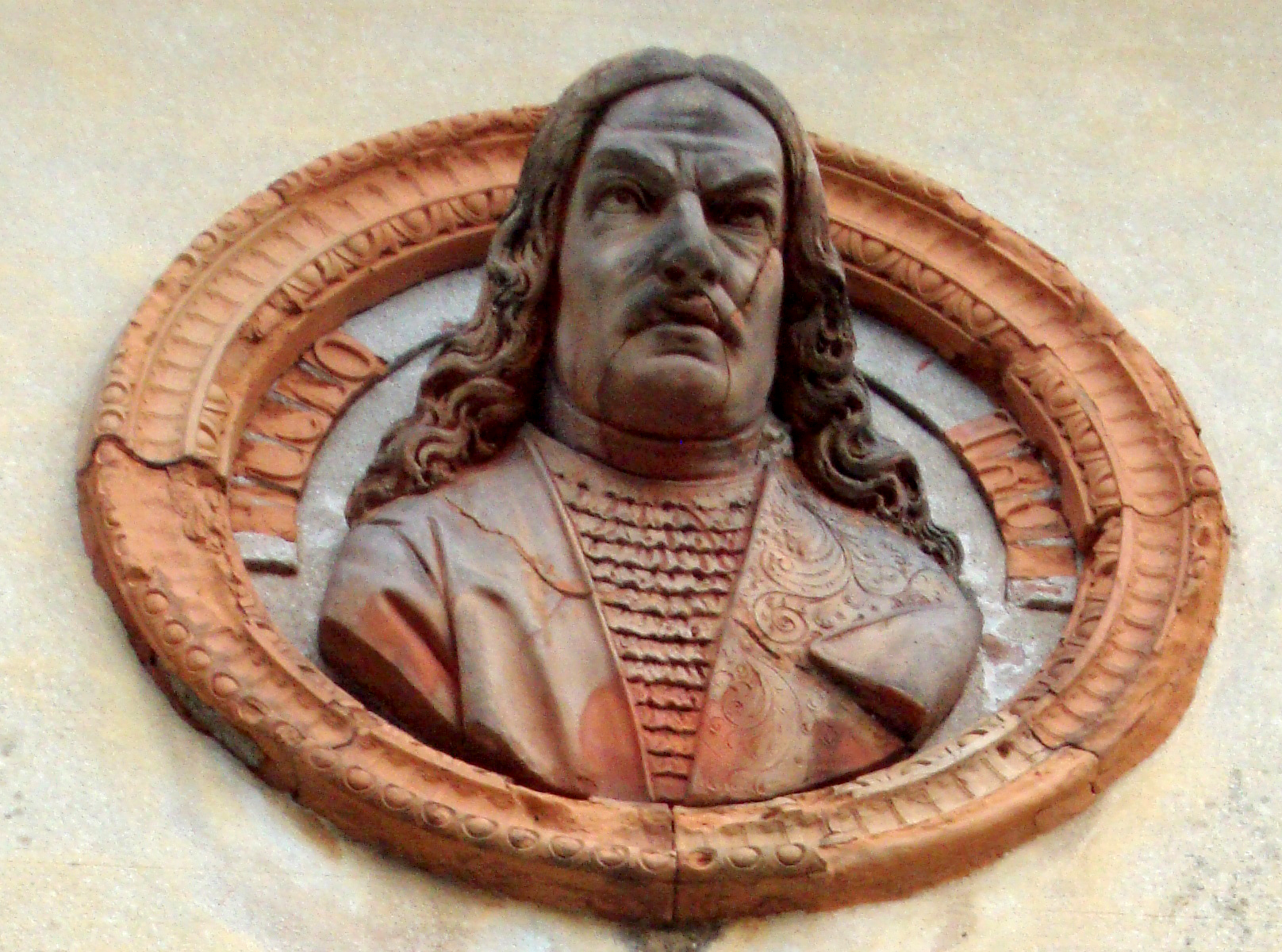
Medallion of Nicolò Tron, a detail of the façade of the Jacquard theatre in Schio

Once returned in Venice during the summer of 1717, Nicolò Tron brought with him technicians and machines to spread the technical and scientific advances that he had seen in England. The activity that involved him the most was the creation of a woollen mill in Schio, but he was active also in the reorganization of his land holdings in Anguillara.

England had seen the first hydraulic steam pumps achieved by Thomas Savery since 1698, and perfected by Thomas Newcomen and Denis Papin, who had put machines on sale since 1712. The technology was still rudimentary and inefficient, but Tron understood their importance and he had invited English technicians to come in Italy to recreate their machines in his rural retreat in Anguillara Veneta, in order to reclaim marshy areas. The company didn't have the hoped-for success, due to the death of one Englishman and the defection of another one. But this didn't prevent Tron creating identical machines in the hills around Schio, in areas call Tretto, to use them for the drainage of water in the mines of kaolin and carbon.

This technology was probably too immature to show economically valid results, so it remained an experiment without sequel, confined in the two cited locations. However, it was the first time that these machines were demonstrated outside of English borders.

Around these mines, and probably around the steam machines installed there, worked also James Stirling, called "the Venetian", a Scottish mathematician well known in England, who had escaped from England because of jacobite persecutions. He found shelter in Italy thanks to Tron. Stirling dedicated to Tron his treatise Lineae tertii ordinis Newtonianæ. Stirling, like Tron, hoped to have the Mathematics chair at the University of Padua. This didn't happen, probably because people considered Leibniz's theory better than Newton's. We only know that Stirling visited the university once on 25 March 1721.

=== Wool mills in Schio and Follina ===
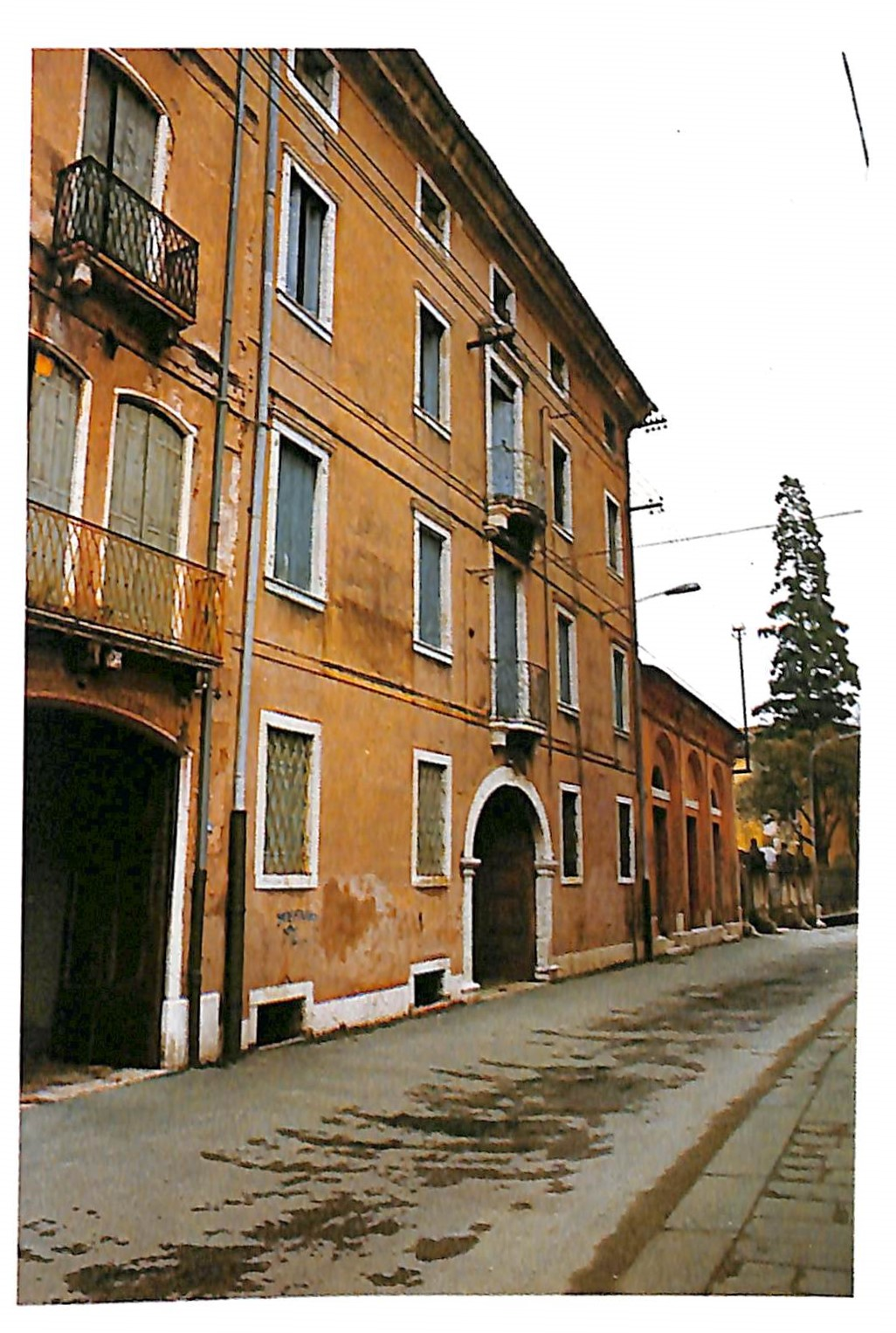
Building of Nicolò Tron's factory in Schio, located at 154 of Via Pasubio.

The most important work in the life of Tron was certainly the foundation of the Tron wool mill in the town of Schio. As soon as he returned home at the end of his mandate as ambassador, the new knight attempted to import technologies and methods into the city of Venice. Here, however, he found the clear opposition of the woollen corporations, which led him to turn his attention and his investments elsewhere. So he chose to build his factory in Schio: this municipality had recently (1701) obtained from Vicenza the permission to produce the so-called high cloths, that is the finest fabrics and those intended for export. Here in 1718 Tron found an evolving environment, where corporations were not as powerful as in Venice or Padua, with large, specialized and low-cost labour. He rented a laboratory with annexed land, had 9 English technicians arrive with families in tow, and he began the production of fine and very fine fabrics with new weaving, dyeing and raw material technologies. With a behaviour which we would define from other times, he, at least initially, left the door of his company open so that the other companies in the area would also take vision and have awareness of new technologies. In a few years his company had 26 looms, produced 300 pieces a year and employed 600 people.

Also to avoid the Schio woollen mill crisis, in 1749 Tron acquired in company with the German Georg Stahl, who became its director, the historical woollen mill of Follina, a thriving company of considerable size in the late 1600s, but in a deep crisis in the mid-1700s. As was the case for Schio, he introduced new processes, the londrine seconde, brought in foreign technicians and employed new technologies, and within a few years the factory employed a thousand people, becoming one of the largest factories in Italy. From 1766 he worked first in the Schio woollen mill, and later in the Follina mill, with the Frenchman Jean Pierre Douarche, who introduced the flying shuttle invented by John Kay, which halved the labour required for weaving.

This huge development did not last long; in the following years the production decreased, and from 1726 Tron undertook the management of the company, also sharing its ownership. The reasons of this crisis were studied a lot and can be listed as:

- difficulty in trading new products, whose costs were not competitive as some fabrics from other countries, like some Eastern country;
- Tron did not manage directly the company, entrusting its management to third parties;
- problems in the management of the workers, which were caused by part-time workers that also worked in the country; this made quality controls harder;
- the competition not only from foreign trades, but also from little factories in the neighbourhood, that had learned quickly the technological innovations and hired the best workers.
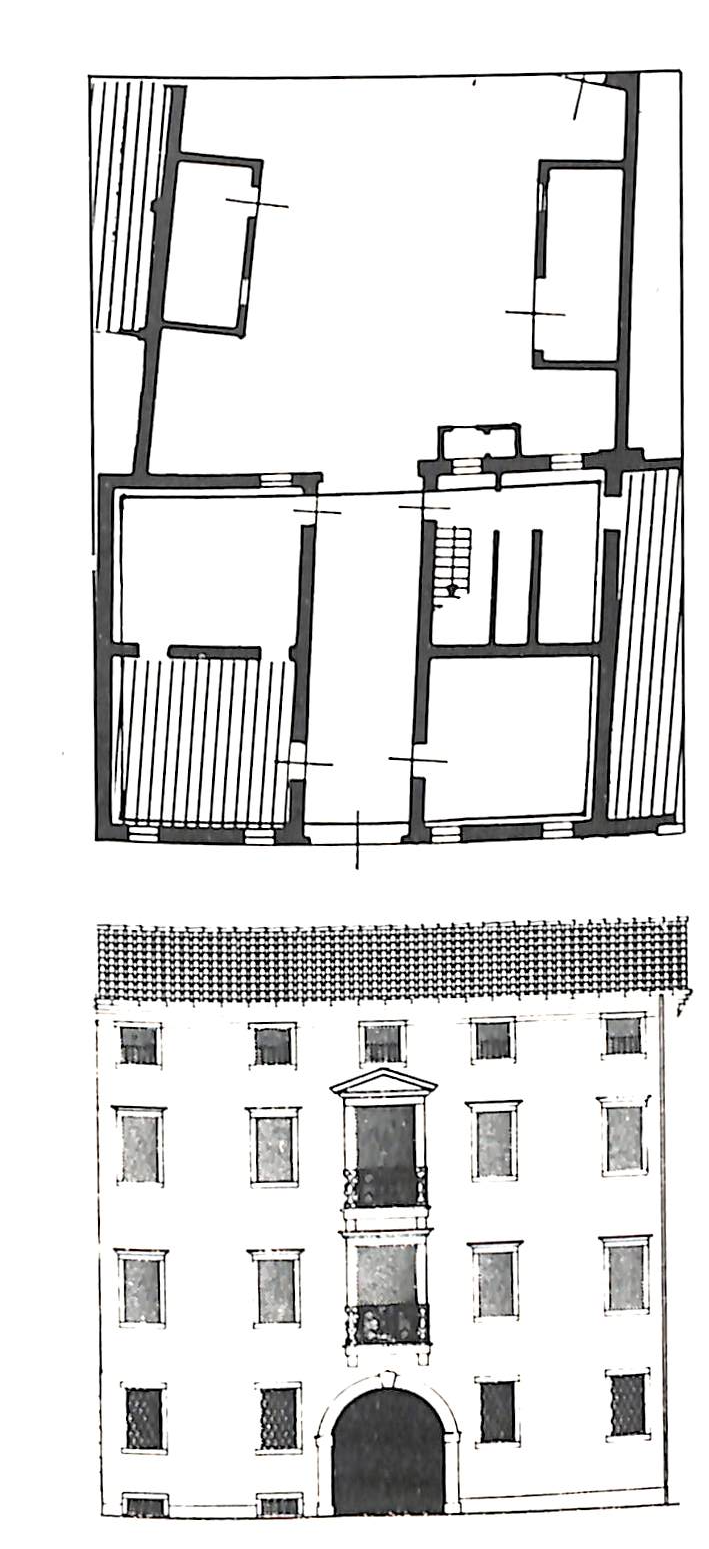
Plan and elevation of the Niccolò Tron factory in via Pasubio, Schio

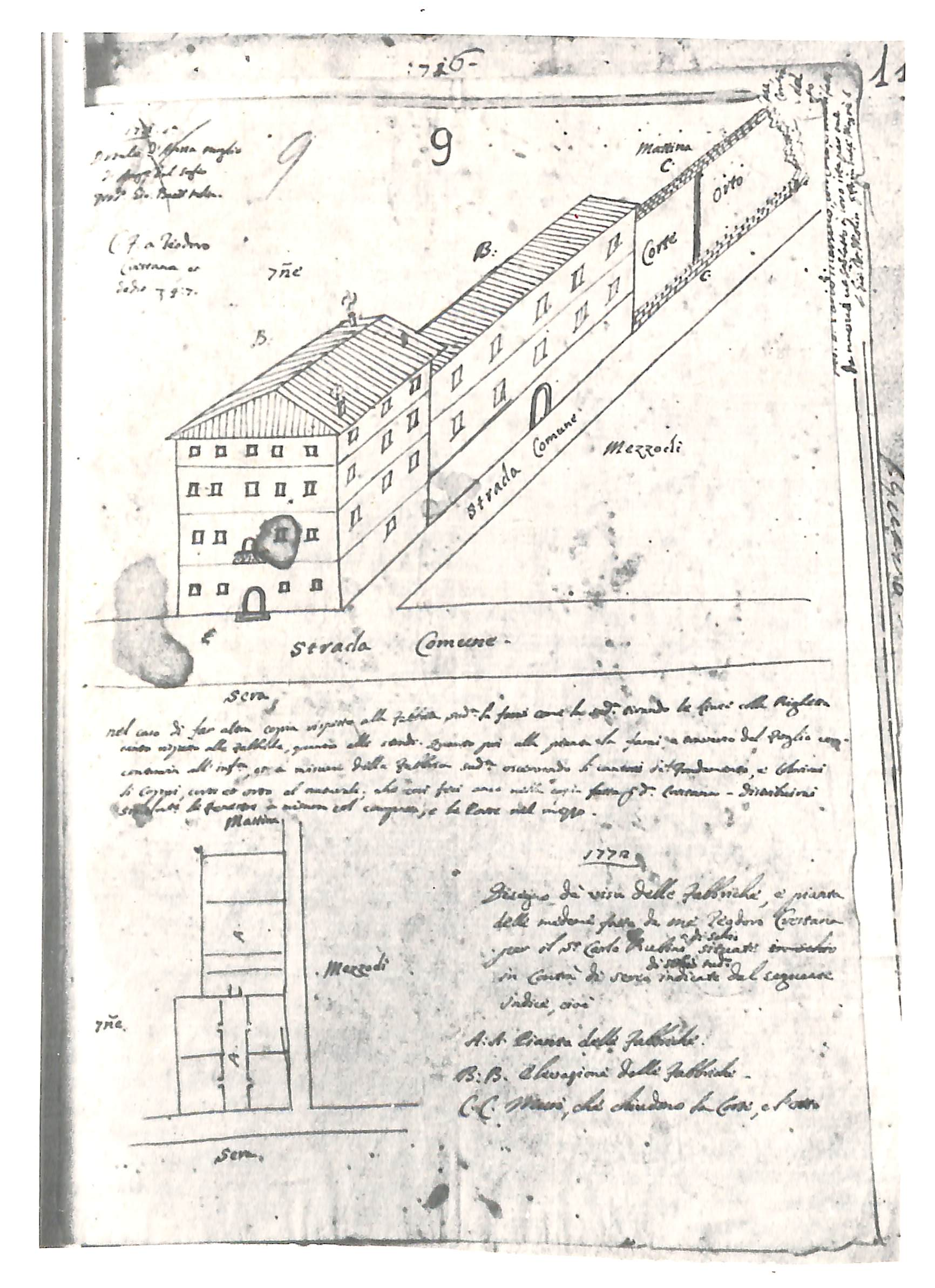
Elevation of the Niccolò Tron factories in Schio

=== Political activity ===
Nicolò Tron was mostly known, at his time, as a politician involved in the economy and finance of the Republic of Venice, for his peers. In particular, in 1726, he was elected adviser at the Mercanzia. In 1737 he was nominated Capitain of Padua and from 1739 to 1741 he was in charge as General Superintendent in the Homeland of Friuli. In his political actions, he tried mostly to favour Venetian businesses against the overwhelming competition of goods from abroad.

He died in Venice in 1771.

== Heritage ==
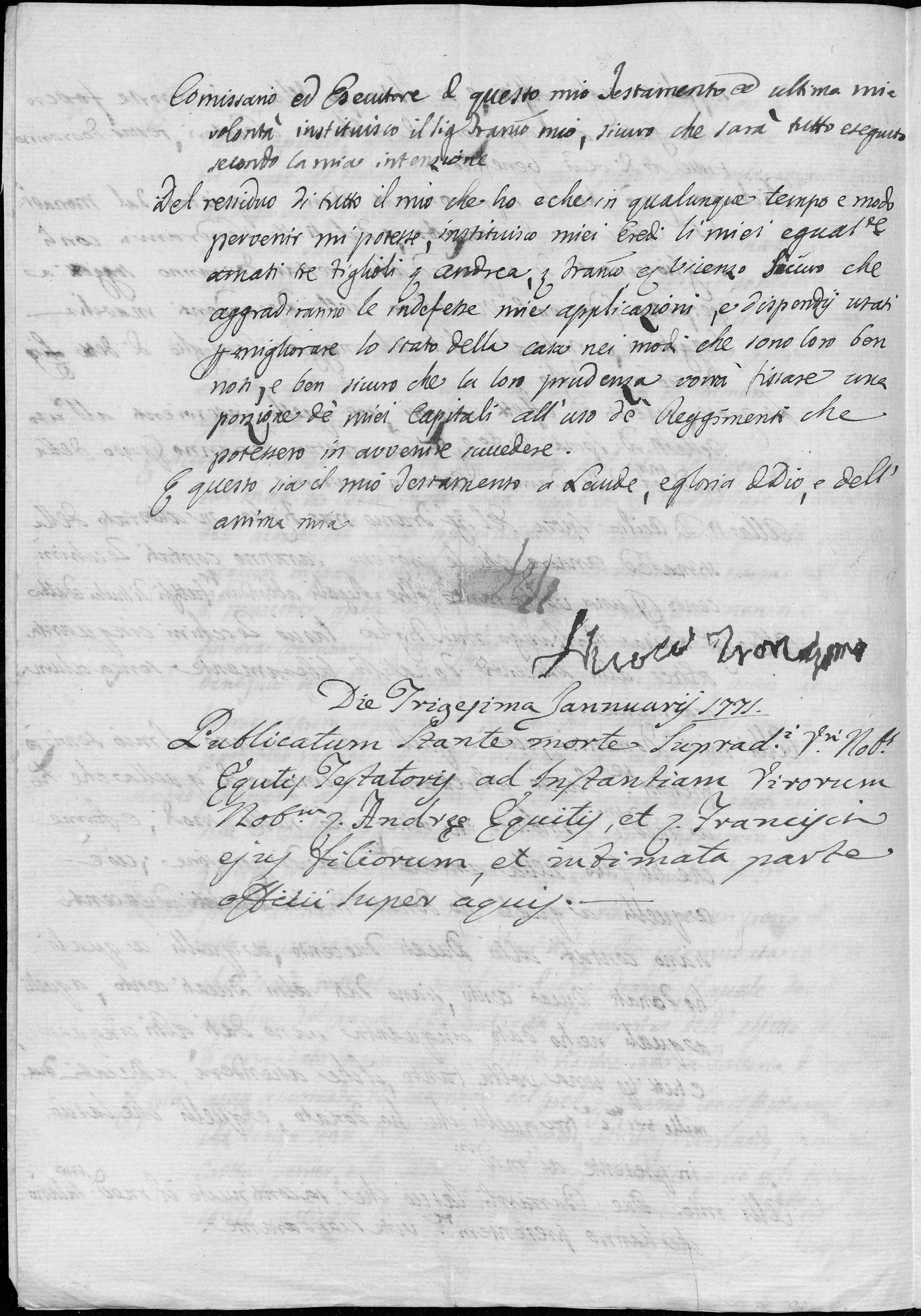
Fourth page of the Nicolò Tron's testament (1771)

Among the many activities of Nicolò Tron, the most important was his textile industry in Schio. After Tron's death, his property was shared with Francesco Rubini, a former worker who became a business owner; after five years he bought the inherited part of Francesco Tron (son of Nicolò), and at the end of the century he led the industry to a new era of prosperity. After that, and after other events and ownership take-overs, the business was owned by Alessandro Rossi, the founder of Lanerossi, one of the major textile industries in the world in the second half of the 18th century.

== Dedications ==
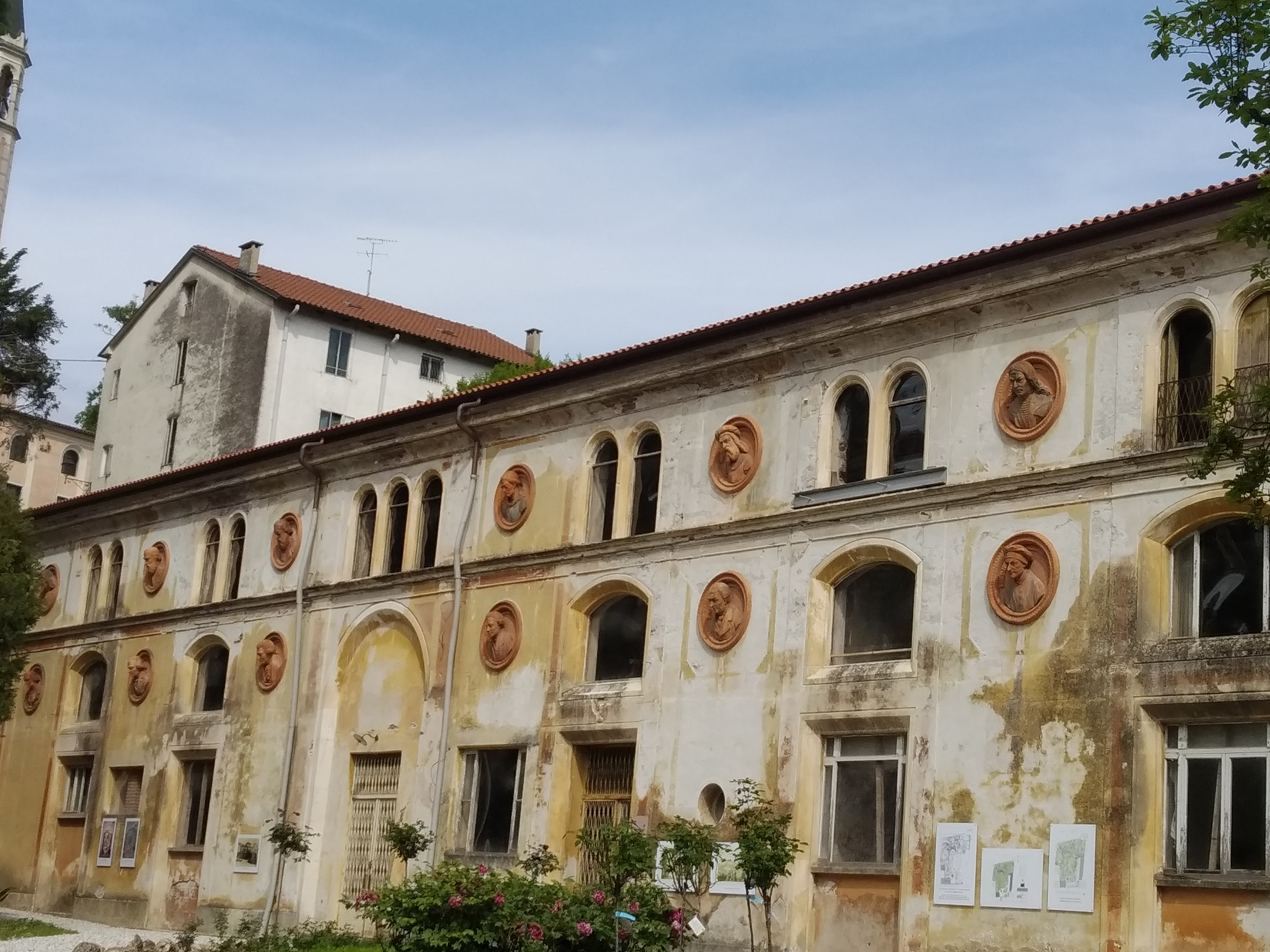
Facciata teatro nel giardino Jacquard a Schio

- In Padua, in the Prato della Valle big square, a statue was dedicated to him. He is represented with a cornucopia on his feet, that can be related to the abundance of the trade.
- In Schio a bust was dedicated to him and it has been placed on the front of the palazzo Toaldi Capra, which until 1980 was called "Palazzo Tron".
- Again in Schio, another bust made of earthenware decorates the front of the Jacquard theatre, located near the place where Tron's factory used to be many years ago.
- In Schio also a Liceo scientifico (High School) and a road were named after him.
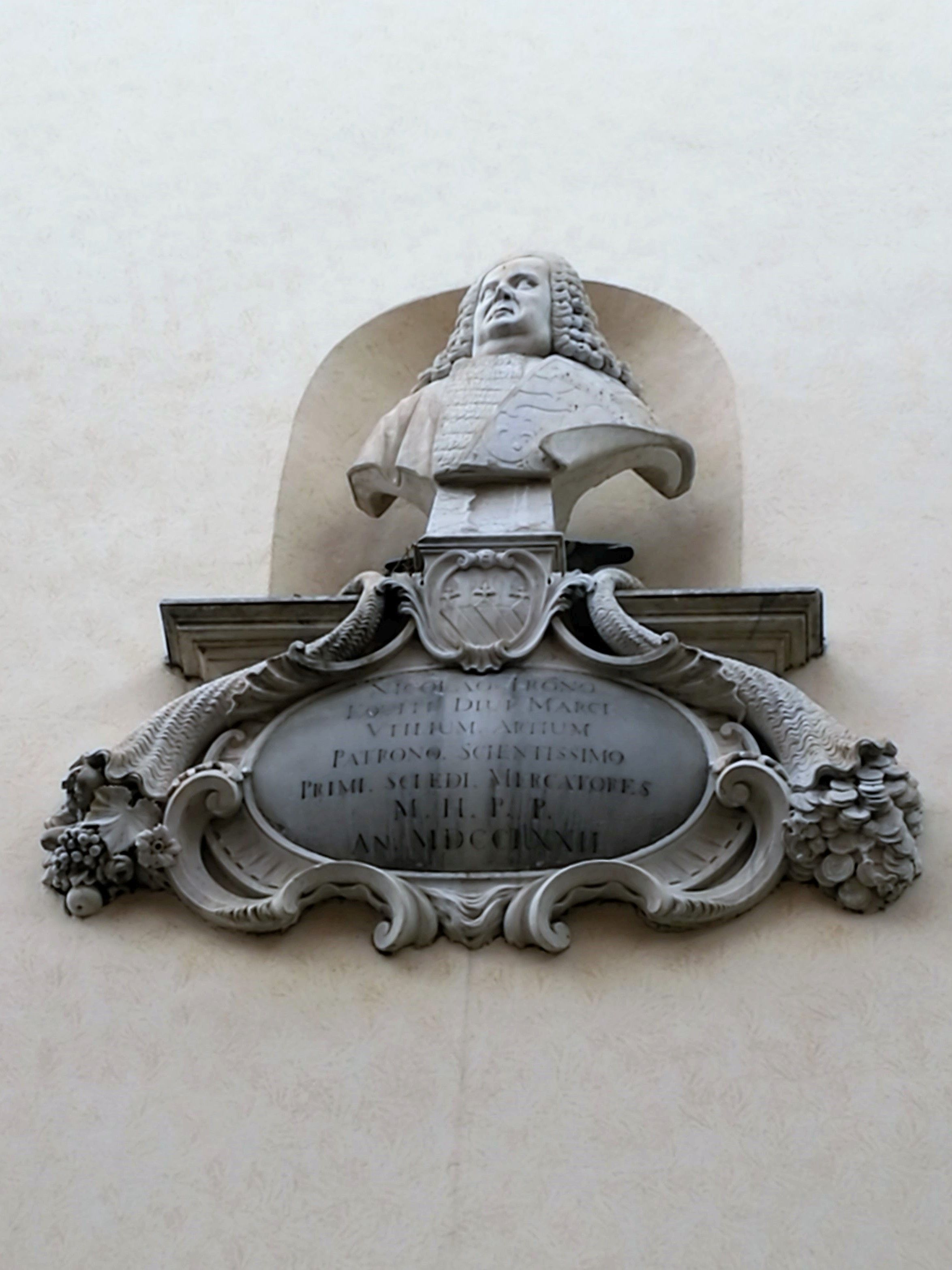
Bust of Niccolò Tron by Pietro Danieletti in the façade of the Palazzo Toaldi Capra, Schio

== Variations of his name ==
- The name Nicolò Tron is reported in this way in the documents about him and in most of the researches of contemporary historians.
- In the monument in Prato della Valle, Padua, and in the Schio's bust the name has been Latinized and declined to the dative: Nicolao Trono.
- In some contemporary studies (see also the references) the name is italianated doubling the "c" letter: Niccolò Tron.
- In the Royal Society archive, or at least in the one reported on the official site, the name loses the accent and the surname takes an "i": Troni Nicolo.

== See also ==
- Tron family
- Schio
- James Stirling (mathematician)
