= Giovanni Mocenigo =

Doge of Venice from 1478 to 1485

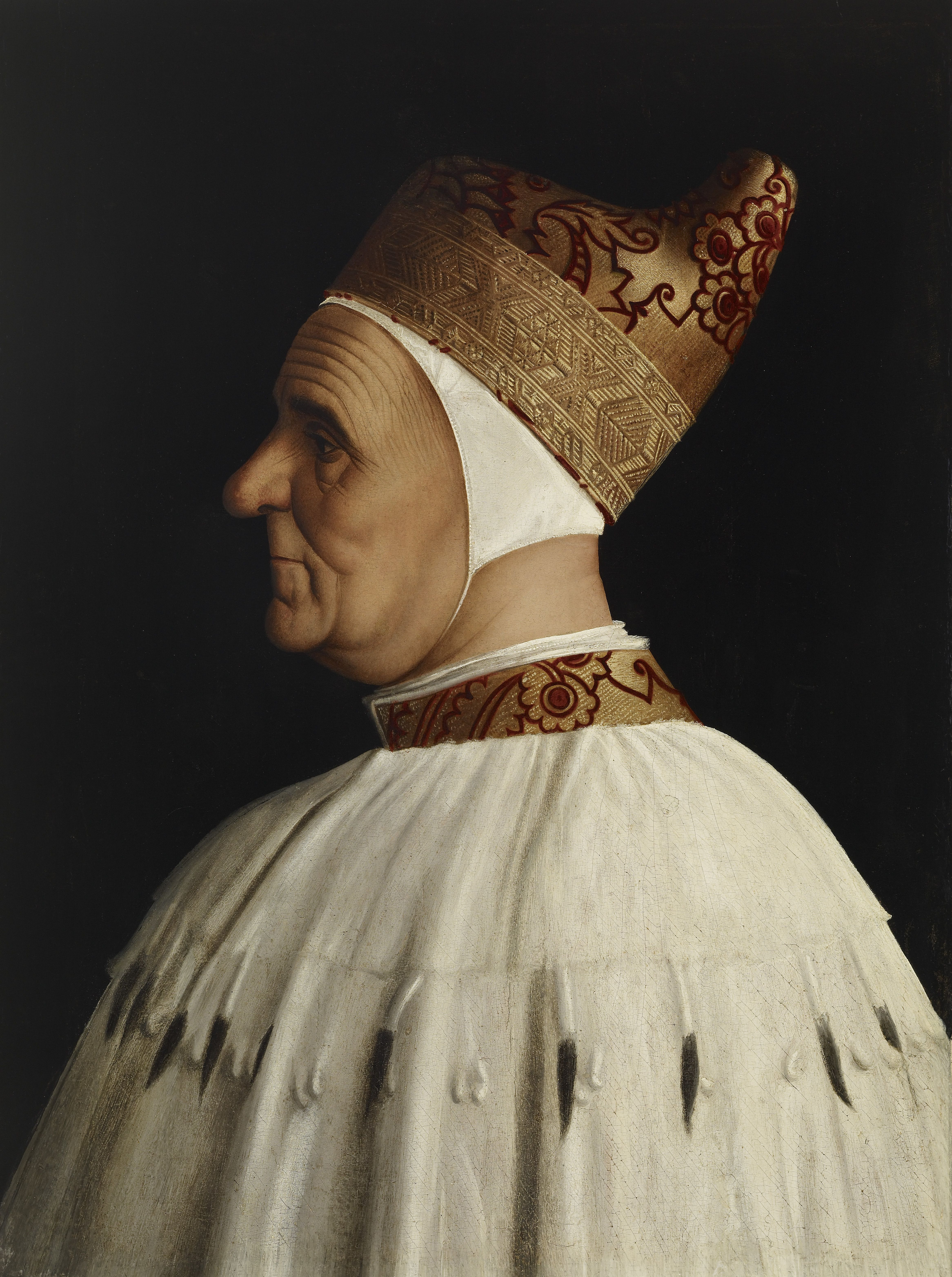
- Portrait of Giovanni Mocenigo, by Gentile Bellini

Doge of Venice
- In office 1478–1485
- Preceded by: Andrea Vendramin
- Succeeded by: Marco Barbarigo

Personal details
- Born: 1408 Venice, Republic of Venice
- Died: 4 November 1485 (aged 76–77) Venice, Republic of Venice

Giovanni di Mocenigo (1408 – November 4, 1485) was doge of Venice from 1478 to 1485. He fought at sea against the Ottoman Sultan Mehmed II and on land against Ercole I d'Este, duke of Ferrara, from whom he recaptured Rovigo and the Polesine. He was interred in the Basilica di Santi Giovanni e Paolo, a traditional burial place of the doges. His dogaressa was Taddea Michiel (d. 1479), who was to be the last dogaressa to be crowned in Venice until Zilia Dandolo in 1557, almost a century later. His brother, Pietro Mocenigo, served as Doge before him, in 1474–1476.

== Early life ==
Giovanni Mocenigo was born in Venice in 1408, to a very distinguished family: both his father, Leonardo, and his grandfather, Pietro, were appointed Procurator of Saint Mark. His early life is little known, apart from his marriage to Taddea Michiel, of another highly distinguished family of the Venetian patriciate, in 1432. The couple had two children, Leonardo and Luchina.

Mocenigo's early activities may have been related to trade. His first election to public office was to the Council of Forty in July 1441, but he refused the nomination. Nevertheless, he was again elected in November of the same year, but it is unknown whether he accepted or not. Nothing further is known of him until 1451, when he is mentioned in the will of his mother.

== Public career ==
From 1452 on Mocenigo followed a political career, being elected as a member of the Venetian Senate, and then appointed ambassador to Ibrahim II of Karaman to negotiate a commercial treaty and possibly an anti-Ottoman alliance in 1453–1454 (although the identification of the Venetian ambassador with Mocenigo is not entirely certain), and head of the annual trade convoy to Alexandria in June 1454.

In 1463, he was podestà (governor) and captain of Ravenna, then savio di Terraferma in 1466. From the latter position he was sent to negotiate an alliance with Borso d'Este, Lord of Ferrara, against the Republic of Florence. He was re-elected as savio di Terraferma for the first half of 1467, and then immediately appointed podestà of Treviso. In November 1469 he was elected an avogador di Comùn, but held the office for a few weeks before being appointed luogotenente (governor) of the Patria del Friuli, serving until August 1471. In late 1471 Mocenigo was again savio di Terraferma, and then again avogador di Comùn in 1472. In 1474 he was a savio del consiglio, before being sent, along with Andrea Vendramin and Antonio Venier, to negotiate the extension of the Peace of Lodi with Florence and the Duchy of Milan.

Giovanni Mocenigo participated in the election of Nicolò Tron as Doge of Venice in November 1471, as well as the election of Nicolò Marcello in July 1473, when he unsuccessfully promoted the candidacy of his brother, Pietro. Pietro was more successful in December 1474, and was elected Doge, thus further enhancing Giovanni's position as well: from 1475 until his own election as Doge in 1478, he was consistently elected as a savio del consiglio. Notably, he never held the post of Procurator of Saint Mark before becoming Doge.

In November 1477 he was member of a commission of senators sent to examine the defences of Friuli against a possible Ottoman attack. After the death of Doge Andrea Vendramin on 6 May 1478, Mocenigo was elected as Doge on 18 May. His election was in large part to his popularity for his upright character rather than any political skills, and was won with crucial support of Marco Corner, the brother-in-law of Mocenigo's brother Nicolò.

== Dogate ==
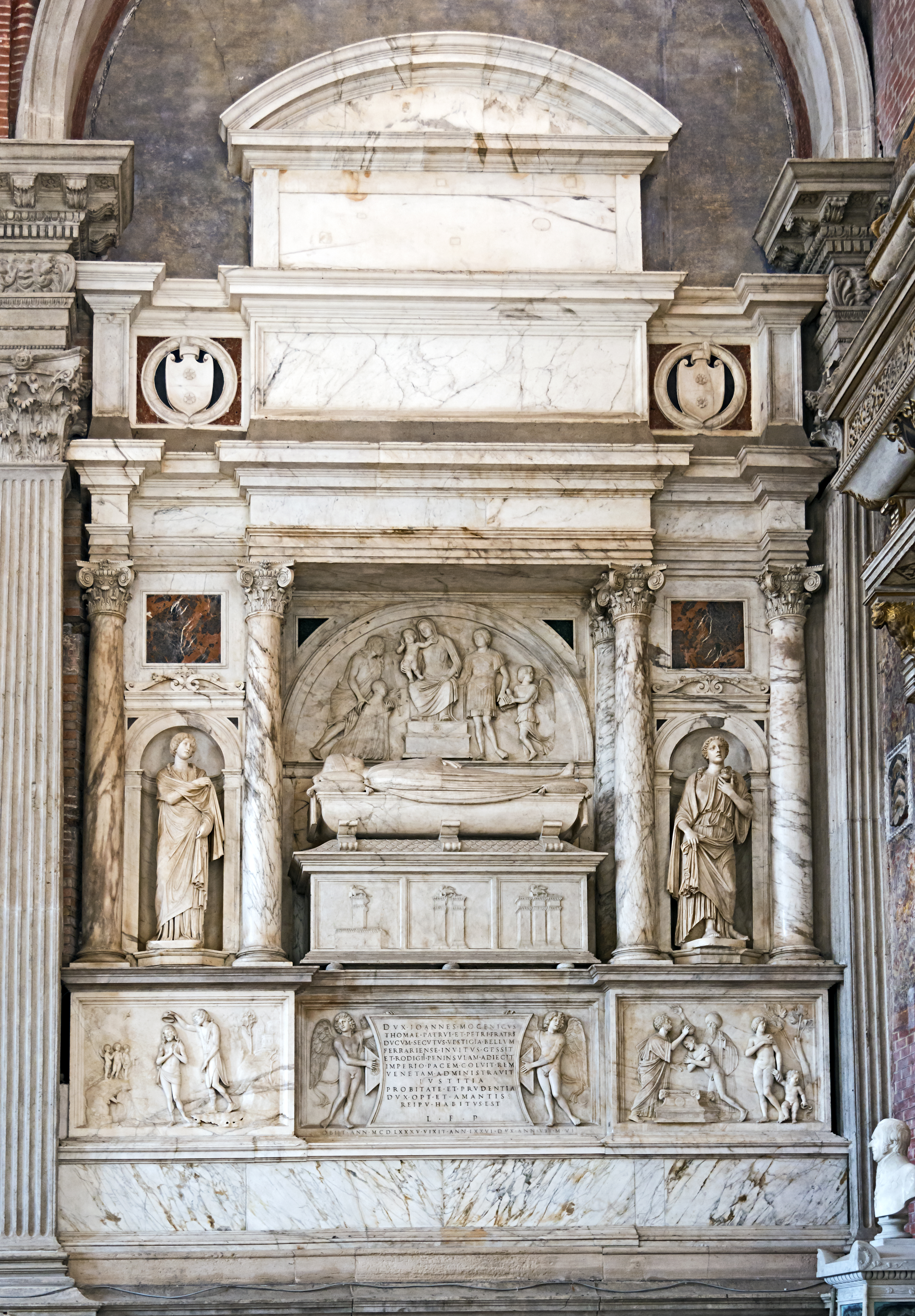
Monument to Giovanni Mocenigo at the church of Santi Giovanni e Paolo, Venice

Mocenigo's dogate was troubled from the outset. Within days of his election, a plague began that lasted until the end of the year and would cost the life of Mocenigo's wife. In addition, in September 1479 the Doge's Palace was devastated by fire, and Mocenigo had to move out. The long war with the Ottomans, going on since 1463, was concluded in January 1479 with the Treaty of Constantinople in a clear Venetian defeat, as Venice had to recognize the loss of Negroponte, Scutari, and other fortresses.

In 1482, a war broke out with the Duchy of Ferrara over the Polesine. The war was costly and harder than expected, but ended with a Venetian victory in the Treaty of Bagnolo on 7 August 1484.

Mocenigo died of the plague on 4 November 1485. He was buried in the Church of Santi Giovanni e Paolo, in a funeral monument by the sculptor Tullio Lombardo.

== Popular culture ==
- In the video game Assassin's Creed II, Giovanni Mocenigo is poisoned by the fictional consigliere and Council of Ten member Carlo Grimaldi, which leads to Marco Barbarigo being installed as doge. This fictionalization was actually based on real-life speculations that Giovanni Mocenigo was poisoned.

== See also ==
- Mocenigo family

== Sources ==
- Gullino, Giuseppe (2011). "MOCENIGO, Giovanni". Dizionario Biografico degli Italiani (in Italian). Vol. 75: Miranda–Montano. Rome: Istituto dell'Enciclopedia Italiana. ISBN 978-88-12-00032-6.

Political offices
Preceded by Andrea Vendramin	Doge of Venice; 1478–1485	Succeeded by Marco Barbarigo
