= Maglione (disambiguation) =

Maglione is an Italian commune (municipality) in the Province of Turin.

Maglione may also refer to:

== Places ==
- Mount Maglione, a low mountain near Mount Ekblaw in the Clark Mountains, Marie Byrd Land

== People ==
- Julio Maglione, Uruguayan swimmer and member of the IOC
- Luigi Maglione, Italian cardinal

== Fiction ==
- Gianna Maglione, a character created by playwright Penny Mickelbury
