= Marzotto Group =

Italian textile manufacturing company

Marzotto S.p.A.
- Industry: Textiles
- Founded: 1836
- Headquarters: Valdagno, Italy
- Key people: Antonio Favrin (president)
- Revenue: 356.8 mil Euro (2018)
- Number of employees: 3,245 (2018)
- Website: www.marzottogroup.it

The Marzotto Group is an Italian textile manufacturer, based in Valdagno.

Created in 1836 as the Lanificio Luigi Marzotto & Figli. In 2005 Marzotto Group's textile business separated from Valentino Fashion Group.

The Group manufactures woollen and cotton yarns for clothing, and through equity investments, woollen yarns for knitwear, linen yarns and silk.

== History ==
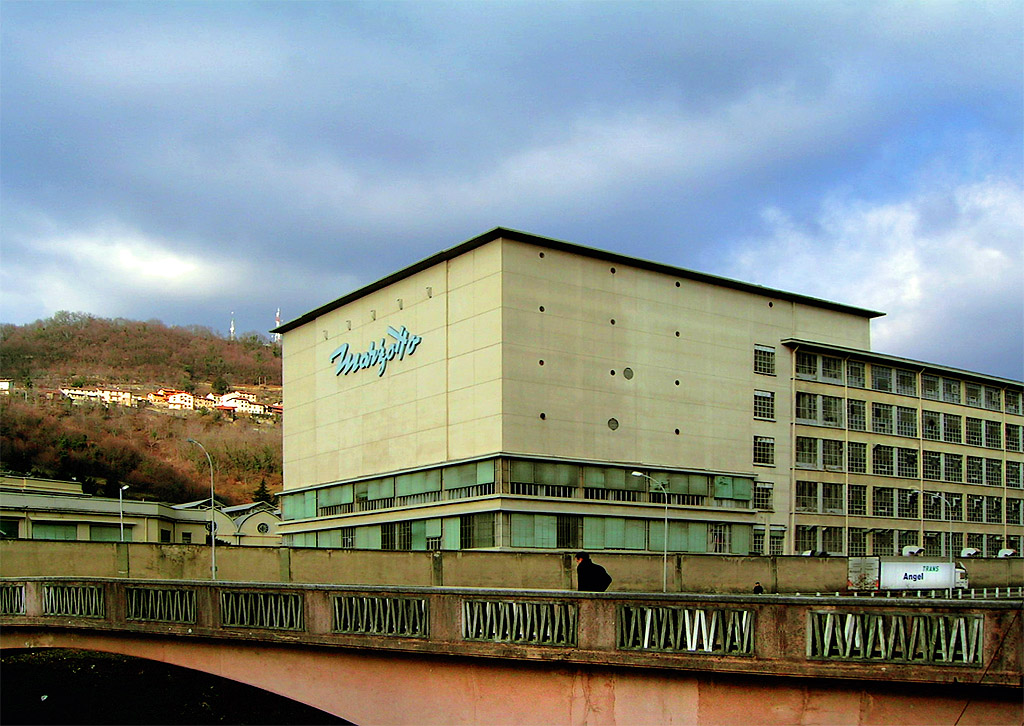
Marzotto headquarters

=== Early years ===
As a member of the nobility, Luigi Marzotto (1773-1859) founded a wool mill in Valdagno in 1836 with a capital of 2 000 Venetian Lira, equivalent to $100 000 in the nineties. He handed the business to his son Gaetano in 1842. After the unification of the kingdom of Italy in 1861, Gaetano bought a spinning factory nearby Maglione. By then, the company's payroll had risen to over 1.200 employees.

After Gaetano's death in 1910, Marzotto S.p.A. split in two, so his grandson took over the Maglione factory and his son Vittorio Emanuele Marzotto, who has been credited with leading the company into the export business, took over the Valdagno operations.

=== Mid-Twentieth Century ===
In 1920, Gaetano Jr. inherited the Valdagno mill. According to the company history, Gaetano Jr. modernized the company and expanded during the 1920s, allowing it to survive the Great Depression without being nationalized, and reacquiring the family mill in Maglione. In 1935, Gaetano created an agricultural complex between Fossalta di Portogruaro and the Venetian Lagoon, called it after his wife, Margherita Lampertico Marzotto.

During the World War II, the company was under government control. However, Gaetano recover the company at the end of the conflict and took advantage of the Italian economic miracle.

In the 1950s, Marzotto S.p.A. diversified in the manufacturing of private-label menswear, Principe by Marzotto. After going public in 1961 with a listing on the Milan exchange market Borsa Italiana, the company started exporting its products to the United States. To reduce labour costs, 40 percent of the clothing production would eventually be transferred there.

=== Expansion ===
Between the 1980s and 1990s, Marzotto S.p.A. expanded through acquisitions. Marzotto became Europe's first fully integrated wool producer in 1987 after acquiring Lanerossi, followed by Hugo Boss in 1991 and Czechoslovakia’s Nová Mosilana wool mill in 1994. In 1997, the group announced a merge with HPI to form Gruppo Industriale Marzotto, the world's largest designer clothing manufacturer. However, Pietro Marzotto abruptly stopped negotiations, which led to Pietro's resignation of his function as chief executive and the take-over by Jean de Jaeger, the first non-Marzotto to be promoted to such a function. Pietro nonetheless remained the majority shareholder of Marzotto S.p.A. and he purchased Liteksas, a Lithuanian wool garments manufacturer, in 2000, so that the company could shift part of its production to the lower-cost market. He also bought Valentino S.p.A., which had been struggling under HPI, in 2002.

The development of the Marzotto group continued in 2009, acquiring the NTB Nuova Tessilbrenta brand, specialized in the production of cotton casual and sportswear; It also stipulates the collaboration agreement with the Schneider Group, an important and recognized player in the sector in the acquisition and combing of wool and noble fibers, which provides for the creation of a joint production company for the processing of wool, in which Marzotto participates with 30% shares, based in a new plant in Egypt. In October 2009, Marzotto acquired, together with Faber Five, a company owned by Antonio Favrin, 66.7% of Ratti, one of the most important Como companies in the world of silk, founded in 1945 by Antonio Ratti.

In July 2018, Davide Favrin, a Management Engineering graduate and son of Antonio, the historical manager and shareholder of the company, first as CEO in 2002 and then as president since 2004, was appointed CEO, replacing Sergio Tamborini, at the head of the group since 2006. In 2020-2021, the Marzotto Group will acquire Opera Piemontese, a brand specializing in the production of fine fabrics for women's fashion, and Prosetex, a brand specializing in the production of jacquard fabrics, flat fabrics and velvets for upholstery and curtains in the premium segment.

== Others ==
Marzotto supported the development of Valdagno, giving services to workers such as schools, hospitals, entertainment, and social facilities. In 1951, the Marzotto family established the Marzotto Prize, awarding people from medicine, modern sciences, poetry, journalism, theatre and painting.
