= House of Mocenigo =

Venetian noble family

Coat of arms of the House of Mocenigo.

The House of Mocenigo (Venetian pronunciation: [motʃeˈniɡo], Italian pronunciation: [motʃeˈniːɡo]) was a Venetian noble family of Lombard origin. Many of its members were doges, statesmen, and soldiers.

== Notable members ==
- Tommaso Mocenigo (1343–1423), doge from 1414 to 1423
- Pietro Mocenigo, doge from 1474 to 1476
- Giovanni Mocenigo, doge from 1478 to 1485
- Filippo Mocenigo, Archbishop of Nicosia from 1560 to 1586
- Luigi Mocenigo (Alvise I Mocenigo), doge from 1570 to 1577
- Giovanni Zuane Mocenigo (1531–1598), accused Giordano Bruno of blasphemy and heresy.
- Tommaso Alvise Mocenigo (1583–1654), Capitano Generale da Mar, (admiral) of the Venetian fleet 1648–1651, and again 1653–1654, during the Cretan War (1645–1669) (Fifth Turkish–Venetian War), commanding during two crucial engagements. He died in Venice soon after his last naval battle, and was memorialised in the church of San Lazzaro dei Mendicanti with a monument by sculptor Giuseppe Sardi (1624–1699)
- Andrea Mocenigo (lived 15th–16th centuries), a senator of the republic and a historian
- Marco Antonio Mocenigo (lived in 16th century), bishop of Ceneda
- Lazzaro Mocenigo (1624–1657), admiral
- Luigi Mocenigo (Alvise II Mocenigo), doge from 1700 to 1709
- Sebastiano Mocenigo (Alvise III Mocenigo), doge from 1722 to 1732.
- Alvise Giovanni Mocenigo (Alvise IV Mocenigo), doge from 1763 to 1778
- Giovanni Mocenigo, ambassador of pope Clement XII in 18th Century
