= Nicolò Tron =

Doge of Venice from 1471 to 1473

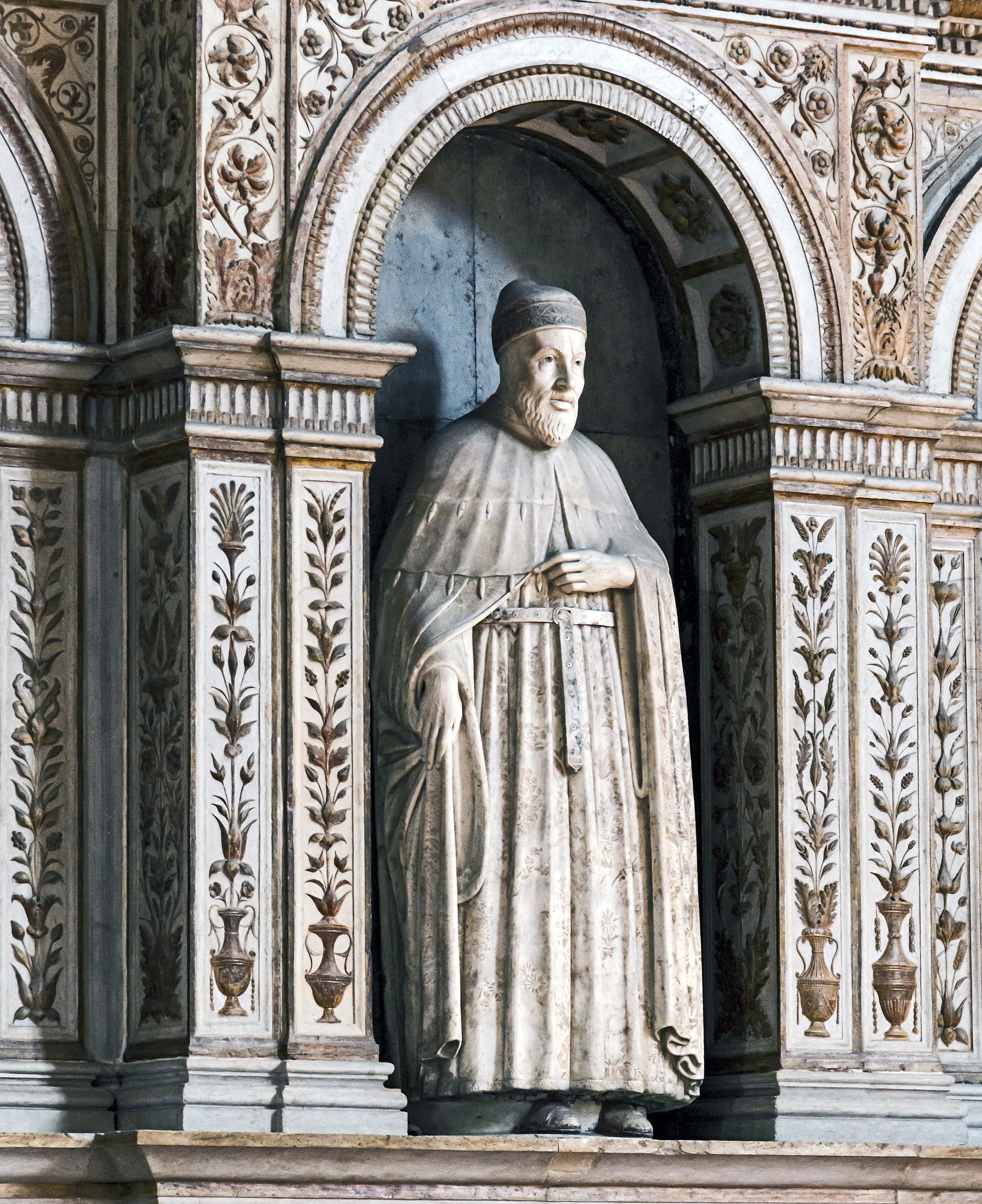
- Niccolò Tron Basilica dei Frari

Doge of Venice
- In office 1471–1473
- Preceded by: Cristoforo Moro
- Succeeded by: Nicolò Marcello

Personal details
- Born: c. 1399 Venice, Republic of Venice
- Died: 28 July 1473 Venice

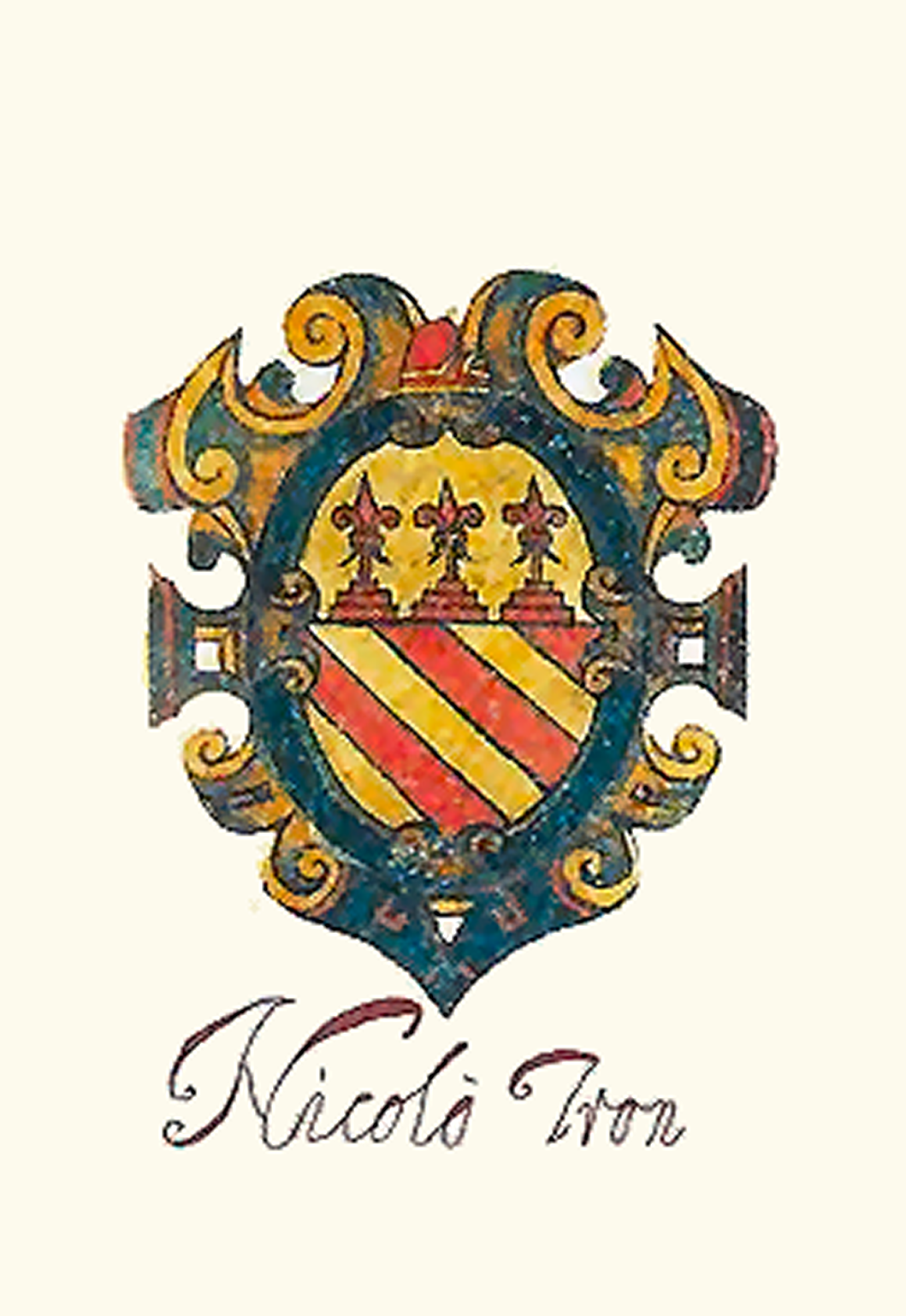
Niccolò Trons coat of arms

Nicolò Tron (born c. 1399 – died 1473 in Venice) was the 68th Doge of Venice, reigning from 1471 to 1473.

== Life ==
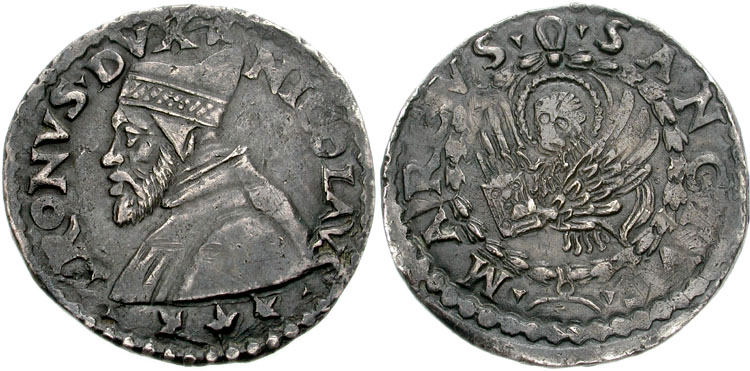
The Tron, back, front

A member of the patrician House of Tron whose presence in Venice had been recorded since the Middle Ages, Nicolò Tron became wealthy after only a brief career as a merchant after which he held various public positions in the government of Venice. He was consigliere for naval matters and ambassador of Venice to Pope Pius II, who had waged a war with Vlad Dracula against Mehmed the Conqueror. Tron was married to Aliodea Morosini, known sometime as Dea Tron or Dea Moro.

== Doge ==
In the doge election of 1471 Tron prevailed against his later successors Pietro Mocenigo and Andrea Vendramin. During his reign Venice consolidated its control of Cyprus and reduced its frequent quarrels with the Turks by forming an alliance with the Turkmen Ussan Hassan Beg. His skillful politics enabled Venice to enjoy a period of freedom during his reign. However, his policy of building up the military sharply increased Venice's public debt.

Tron reformed the monetary system of Venice. He introduced a new coin, called the Lira, which on the reverse side depicted the profile of the doge like the ancient coins used to; and thus went against the Venetian practice of rejecting any association of a personality cult with the Republic of Venice. After his death, the coin was changed to feature a kneeling, unidentifiable Doge.

== Tomb ==
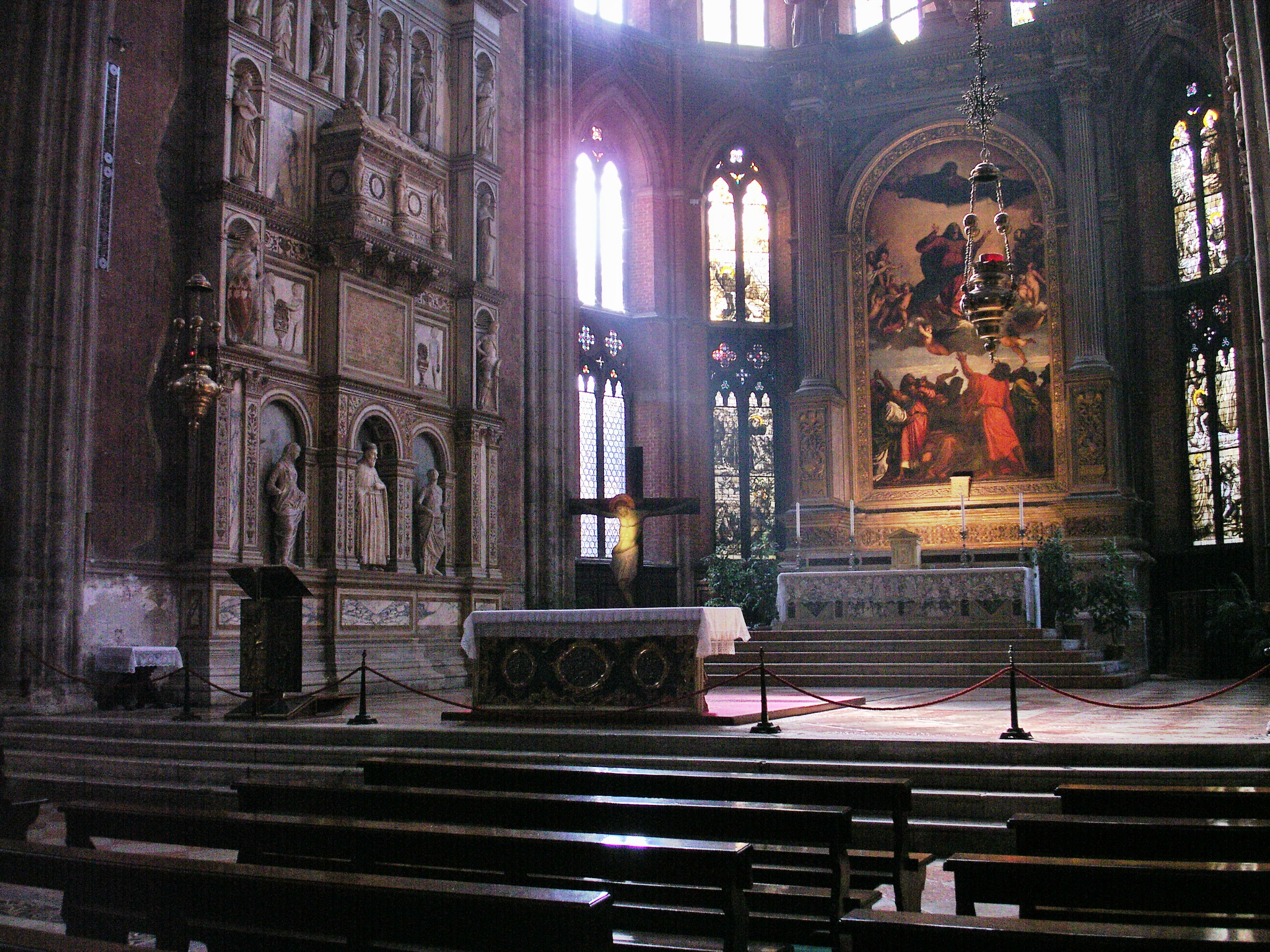
Tomb

Tron's tomb was commissioned by his son Filippo Tron and built in the Basilica di Santa Maria Gloriosa dei Frari. The tomb's design and construction is attributed to the architect of the Doge's Palace, Antonio Rizzo. According to the inscription on the monument, the tomb was financed by loot from Tron's wars with the Turks.

Political offices
| Preceded by Cristoforo Moro | Doge of Venice; 1471–1473 | Succeeded by Nicolò Marcello |
