= Andrea Mocenigo =

- Born: after 1471
- Died: 1542
- Occupations: Senator, Historian

Andrea Mocenigo (after 1471 – 1542), son of Lunardo, was a Venetian senator of the republic and a historian and in 1495 protonotary apostolic. He composed a work on the League of Cambrai entitled Belli memorabilis Cameracensis adversus Venetos historiae libri vi (Venice, 1525).

== See also ==
- Mocenigo family
