= Nicolò Marcello =

Doge of Venice from 1473 to 1474

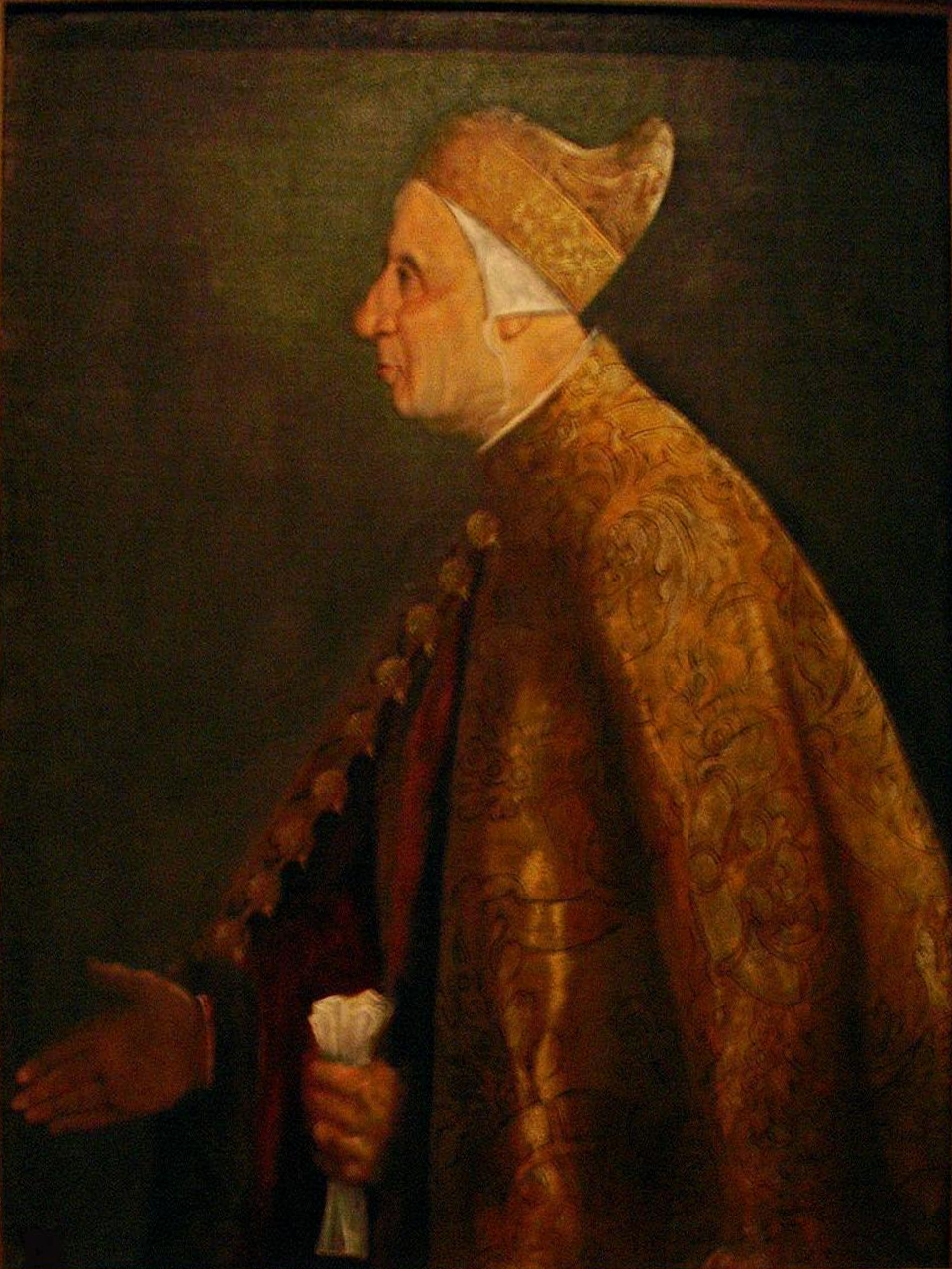
- Portrait of Nicolo Marcello by Titian

Doge of Venice
- In office 13 August 1473 – 1 December 1474
- Preceded by: Nicolò Tron
- Succeeded by: Pietro Mocenigo

Personal details
- Born: c. 1399 Venice, Republic of Venice
- Died: 1 December 1474 (Aged 74-75) Venice, Republic of Venice

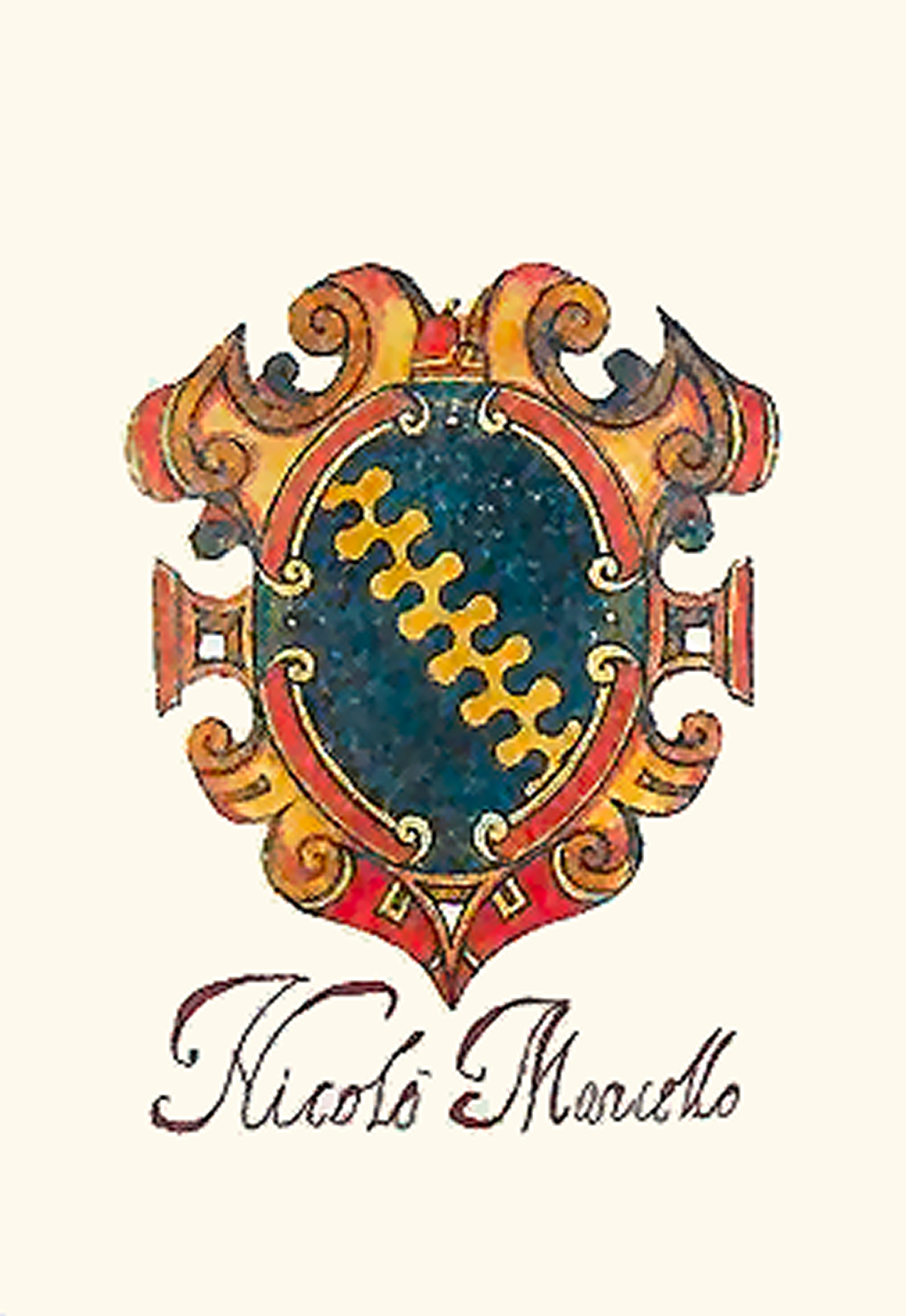
Marcello's coat of arms

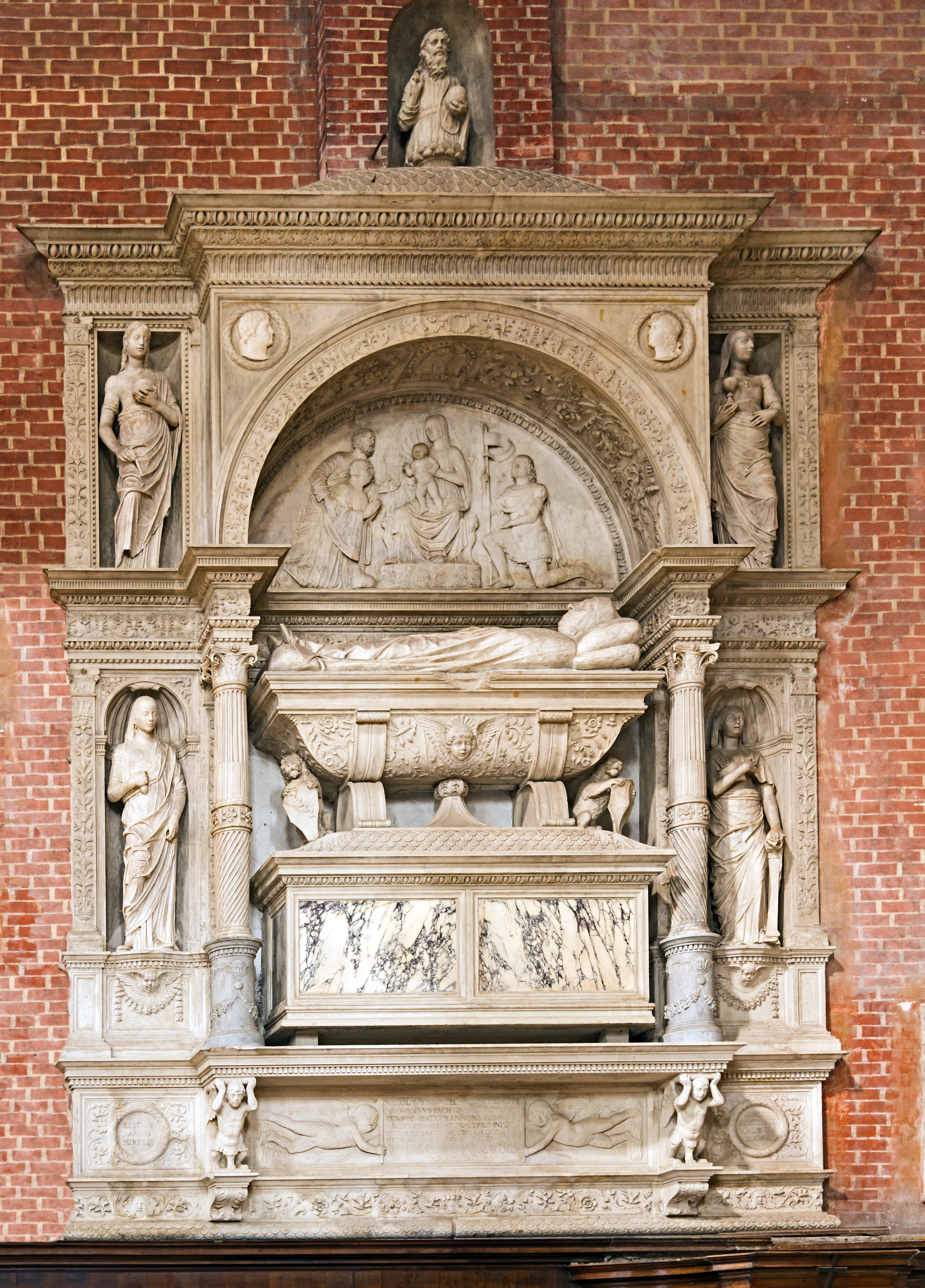
His tomb

Nicolò Marcello (c. 1399 – 1 December 1474) was the 69th Doge of Venice, elected in 1473. He held office for a short period, from 13 August 1473 to 1 December 1474. Said to have been inspired by a previous painting dating from the 15th century, Titian painted Nicolo Marcello's portrait long after his death.

== Life ==
Born a member of the Marcello family, Nicolò was a trader with the Orient before he undertook various important public positions in the Republic of Venice such as provost of the Council of Ten, ducal councillor, and procurator of St Mark's. Marcello married twice: first with Bianca Barbarigo and later with Contarina Contarini, with whom he had a daughter.

== Doge ==
In the 1473 election for doge, Marcello prevailed against the future doges Pietro Mocenigo and Andrea Vendramin. During his brief reign he devoted himself to reorganizing Venice's state finances. He introduced new silver coins that were called Marcello. In his will Marcello bequeathed most of his wealth to charitable ventures.

== Tomb ==
Upon his death, a funeral monument was designed by the artist Pietro Lombardo (c. 1435-1515) and erected in the Santa Marina church. When the church was deconsecrated in 1818, the monument was moved to the Basilica dei Santi Giovanni e Paolo. The question of where the burial took place is controversial.

== Sources ==
- Mosto, Andrea da (1983). I Dogi di Venezia. Florence: Giunti. ISBN 88-09-02881-3.

Political offices
Preceded by Nicolo Tron	Doge of Venice; 1473–1474	Succeeded by Pietro Mocenigo
