= Tron family =

Noble family of Venice, Italy

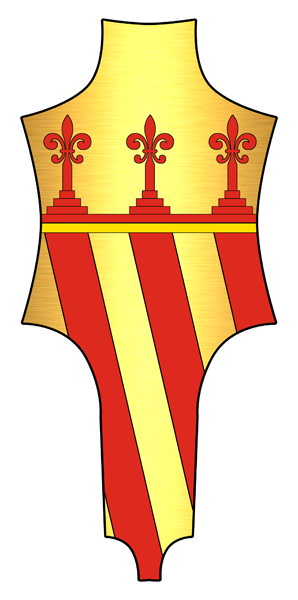
Coat-of-arms of the Tron family

The House of Tron was a noble family of Venice whose most prominent member, Nicolò Tron, served as the Doge of Venice from 1471 to 1473. Other members of the family served as procurators, senators, generals and ambassadors of the Venetian Republic.

== History ==
The family rose to particular prominence in the 15th century as maritime traders and local rulers in Corfu and Crete. The line had allegedly become extinct by the 19th century.

The Tron family moved to France, where it throve and grew in Bouchony. At some point, the family divided and a part relocated to the valley of Ubaye and the city of Barcelonnette.

By the early 20th century, parts of both branches of the family moved to México, where it remains and grows to this day, mainly in México City and Morelia, Michoacán.

The family's origins are unclear, although 18th-century genealogists, including Marco Barbaro in his Albori de' patritii veneti have proposed that they originally came from Ancona. They are thought to have built the now demolished Chiesa di San Boldo in Venice in the 11th century, and there are records in Venice of a Marco "Truno" dating from 1159. The family had three branches: San Stae (from the Venetian parish of San Stae), San Beneto (from the Venetian parish of San Beneto), and Candia (from the Kingdom of Candia, the name of Crete when it was a colony of the Venetian Republic).

== Prominent members ==
- Nicolò Tron (c.1399–1473), member of the San Beneto branch, Doge of Venice from 1471 to 1473.
- Aliodea Morosini (?–1478), Dogaressa of Venice, wife of Nicolò Tron.
- Paolina Tron, wife of Domenico II Contarini, Doge of Venice from 1659 to 1675. She died prior to his election.
- Francesco and Ettore Tron, members of the San Beneto branch, proprietors of the Teatro San Cassiano in 1637 when it became the world's first public opera house.
- Nicolò Tron (1685–1771), member of the San Stae branch, diplomat, politician and agronomist. He was the father of Andrea Tron
- Andrea Tron (1712-1785), member of the San Stae branch, Procurator of San Marco, ambassador to Vienna, Paris, and Rome, and one of the two main candidates for Doge in election of 1779. He was the husband of the poet Caterina Dolfin.

== Landmarks ==
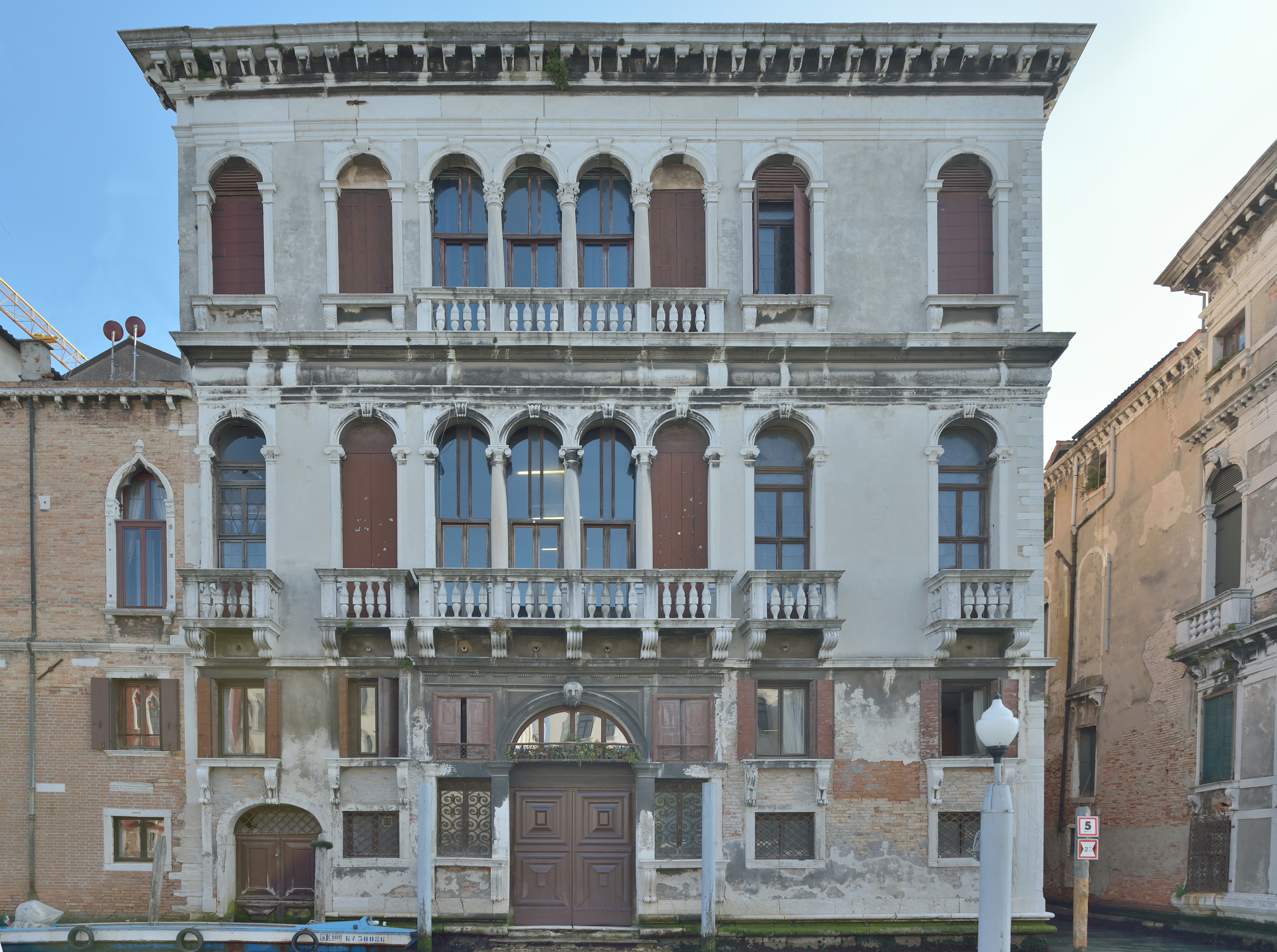
Ca' Tron, Venice

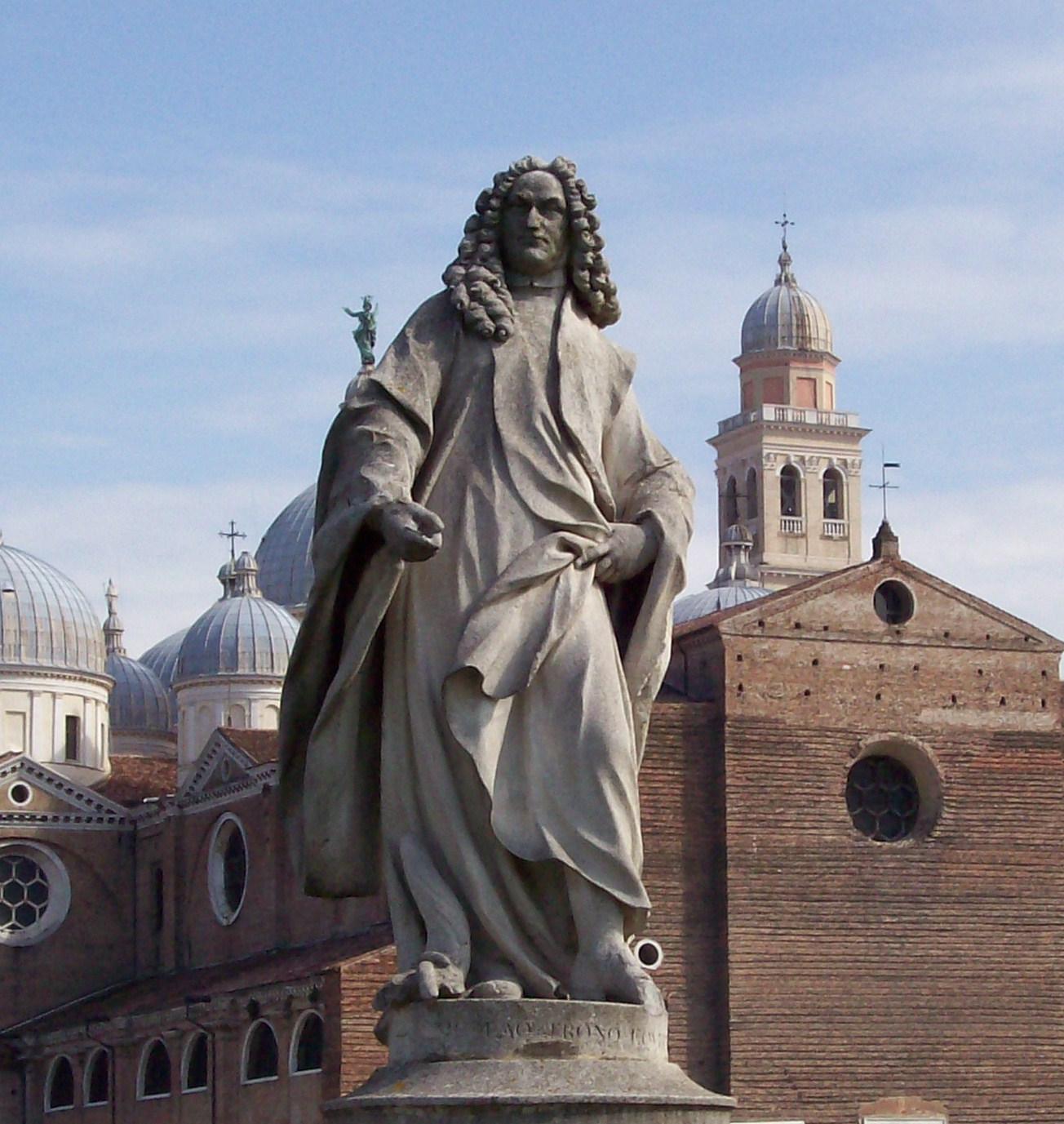
Statue of Nicolò Tron, Padua

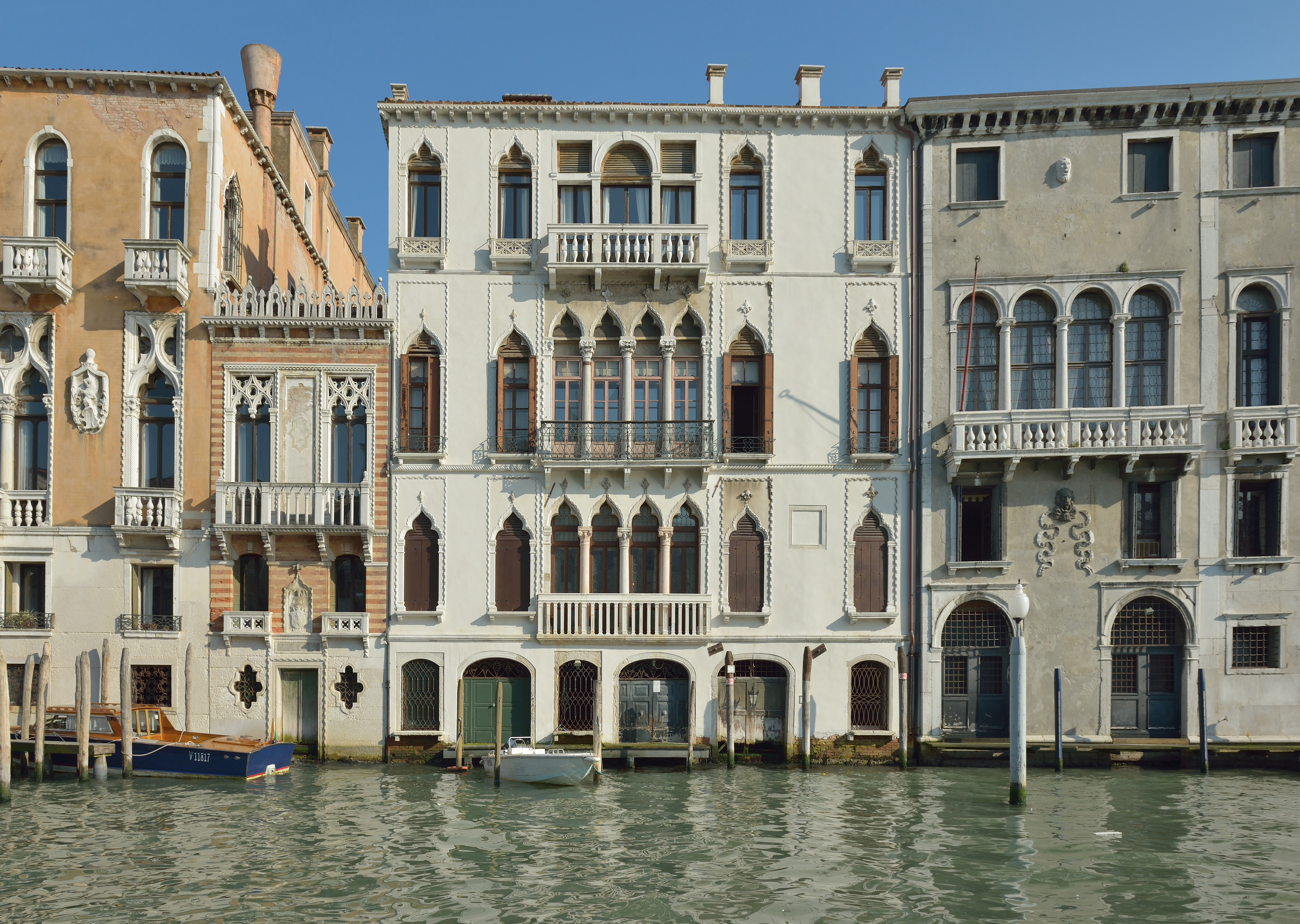
Palazzo Tron a San Beneto, Venice
