= Coriolano Cippico =

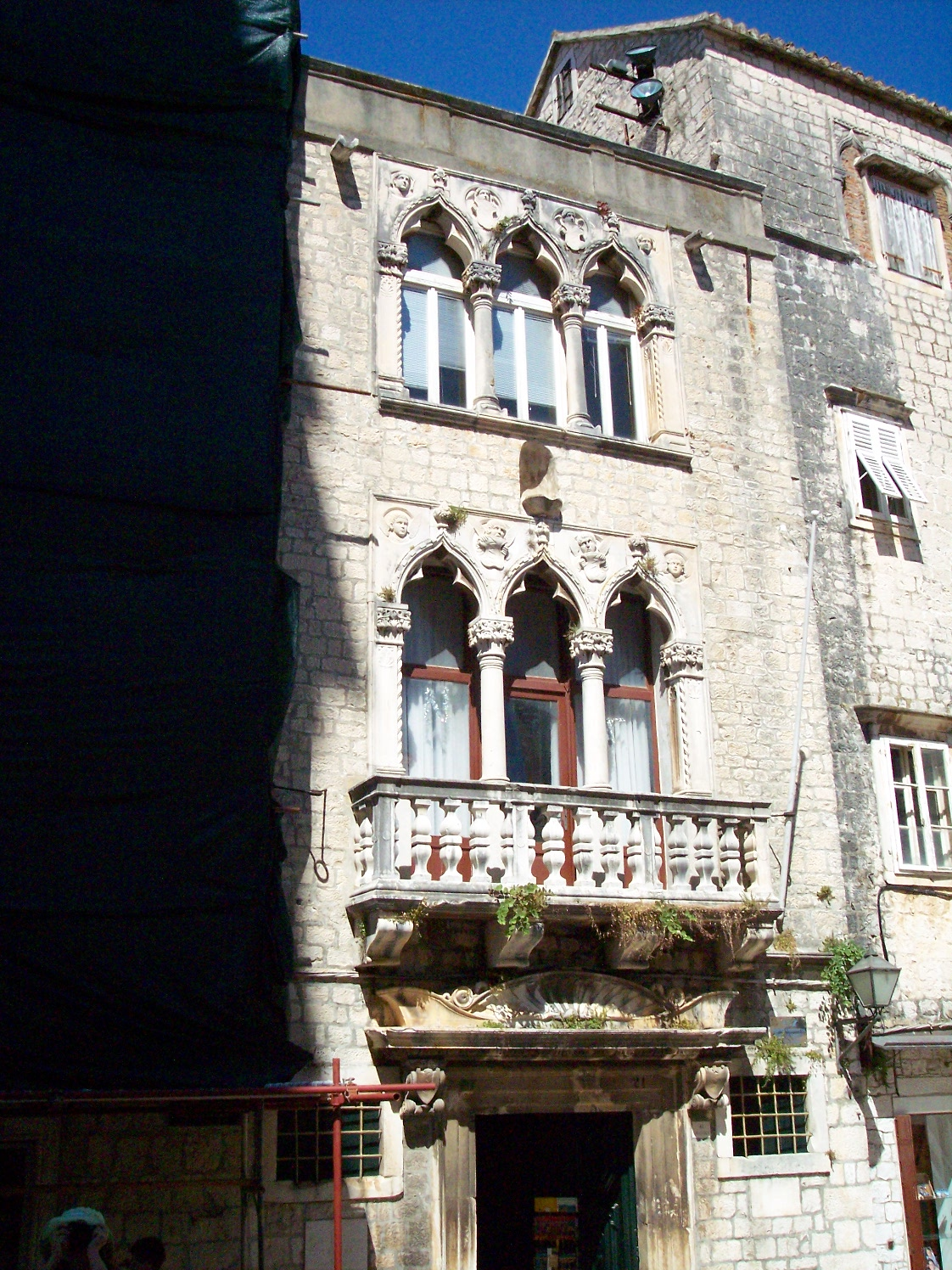
Cippico Palace in Trogir

Coriolano Cippico (1425–1493) was a Dalmatian nobleman, landowner, civil servant, humanist and military commander from Trogir. From 1470 to 1470 he served as galley captain under the future doge Pietro Mocenigo and wrote an elegant, humanist, eye-witness account of the systematic depredation of the Anatolian coast by the Venetian navy.

== Bibliography ==
• Online Biography

• Cippico, Coriolano; Petkov, Kiril (2014). The Deeds of Commander Pietro Mocenigo in Three Books (English translation). Italica Pr. ISBN 978-1-59910-295-5.
