= Lanerossi =

Italian textile brand

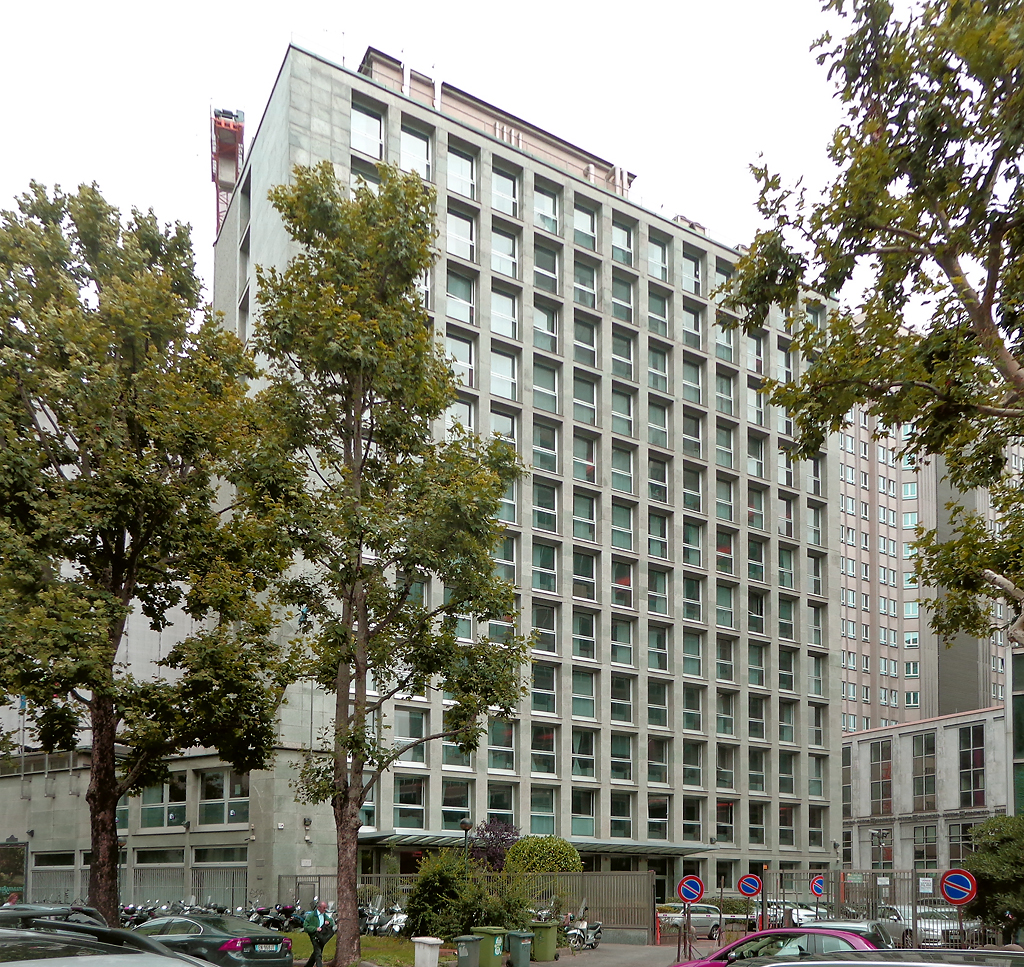
- The Lanerossi building in Milan
- Current owner: Marzotto Group
- Country: Italy
- Introduced: 1817
- Previous owners: Lanificio Rossi s.p.a
- Website: https://lanerossi.it/en/

Lanerossi is an Italian textile brand, established in the 19th century by Schio's Lanificio Rossi. Since 1987, the brand belongs to the Italian Marzotto Group, which use it for the design, production, and marketing of textiles.

== History ==
In 1817, Francesco Rossi founded the Lanificio Rossi wool in Schio.

In 1849, Alessandro Rossi, son of Francesco Rossi, inherited the wool factory. Under his leadership, the company became one of the main industries in Italy. In 1873, the company became Lanificio Rossi s.p.a, a public limited company listed on the Milan Stock Exchange.

Due to management problems, Lanerossi experienced a period of crisis between 1955 and 1957. In 1956, Giuseppe Eugenio Luraghi was called to serve as president and chief executive to reactivate the wool factory and renovate it. Luraghi managed to obtain excellent results in a very short time, reaching a turnover of 23 billion lire in 1959 with about 10,000 employees. In the 1960s, the Italian state acquired Lanerossi through the oil company ENI.

In 1987, Lanerossi was acquired by the competitor Marzotto Group, the current owner, with the consequent cancellation of the stock exchange. The brand has been active with a line of accessories and decorative fabrics. Due to a joint venture with Marzotto group, Filivivi is the current licensee of the brand.

== See also ==
- L.R Vicenza Virtus
- Alessandro Rossi
- Economy of Italy
