= Pietro Mocenigo =

Doge of Venice from 1474 to 1476

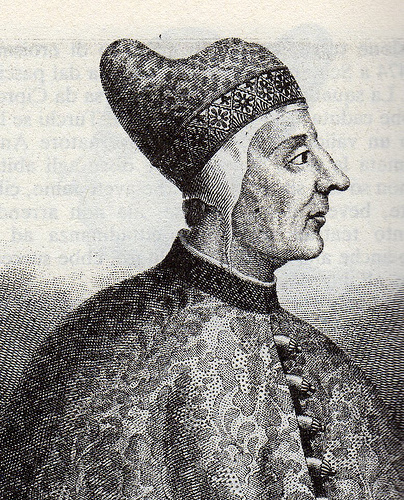
- Pietro Mocenigo

Doge of Venice
- In office 14 December 1474 – 23 February 1476
- Preceded by: Nicolo Marcello
- Succeeded by: Andrea Vendramin

Personal details
- Born: 3 January 1406 Venice, Republic of Venice
- Died: 23 February 1476 (aged 70) Venice, Republic of Venice

Pietro Mocenigo (1406–1476) was doge of Venice from 1474 to 1476.

== Biography ==
Mocenigo was the oldest of eight children (five boys and three girls) of Leonardo Mocenigo and Franceschina Molin. He was the brother of the future doge Giovanni Mocenigo In 1429 he married Laura di Bernardo Zorzi, with whom he had no children.

Mocenigo was a merchant in his younger years. In 1438 he was elected Judge of the Proprio and in 1439 he was appointed to the Signori della Notte for the Sestiere of San Marco.

When his father died towards the end of 1442, Mocenigo began a career in the navy. On March 14 of the following year, he became Supercomito (Commander) of the Adriatic fleet. On 17 March 1443, while chasing Catalan corsairs, Mocenigo was shipwrecked at Brindisi and was imprisoned by the local authorities; taken to Naples, he was freed after the intervention of the Venetian ambassador.

Back in Venice, Mocenigo took part in the Senate zonta for most of 1444-49. On 24 August 1449, he was elected Captain of the Beirut Convoy.

Mocenigo was one of the greatest Venetian admirals and revived the fortunes of the Venetian navy, which had fallen very low after the defeat at the Battle of Negroponte in 1470. In 1470 he was elected admiral against the Turks. In 12 days Venice built 73 galleys which, under his command, changed the fate of the war he had waged for four years. In 1472, he captured and destroyed Smyrna; the following year he placed Catherine Cornaro, queen of Cyprus, under Venetian protection, and, by that means, the Republic obtained possession of the island in 1475. He defeated the Turks who were besieging Scutari (now Shkodër), but he there contracted the illness from which he later died.

Mocenigo was elected doge on 14 December 1474. Under his reign the minting of the silver lira coin began, which was called the mocenigo in his memory. Mocenigo died of the malaria he had contracted during a military campaign on February 23, 1476. He was interred in the Basilica di San Giovanni e Paolo, a traditional burial place of the doges, with an elaborate tomb by Pietro Lombardo (illustration).

Coriolano Cippico (Koriolan Cipiko) (1425–93), one of Mocenigo's galley commanders, wrote a description of the campaign of 1474/75, providing an eye-witness account of Christian-Ottoman confrontations in the late fifteenth century.

== Gallery ==
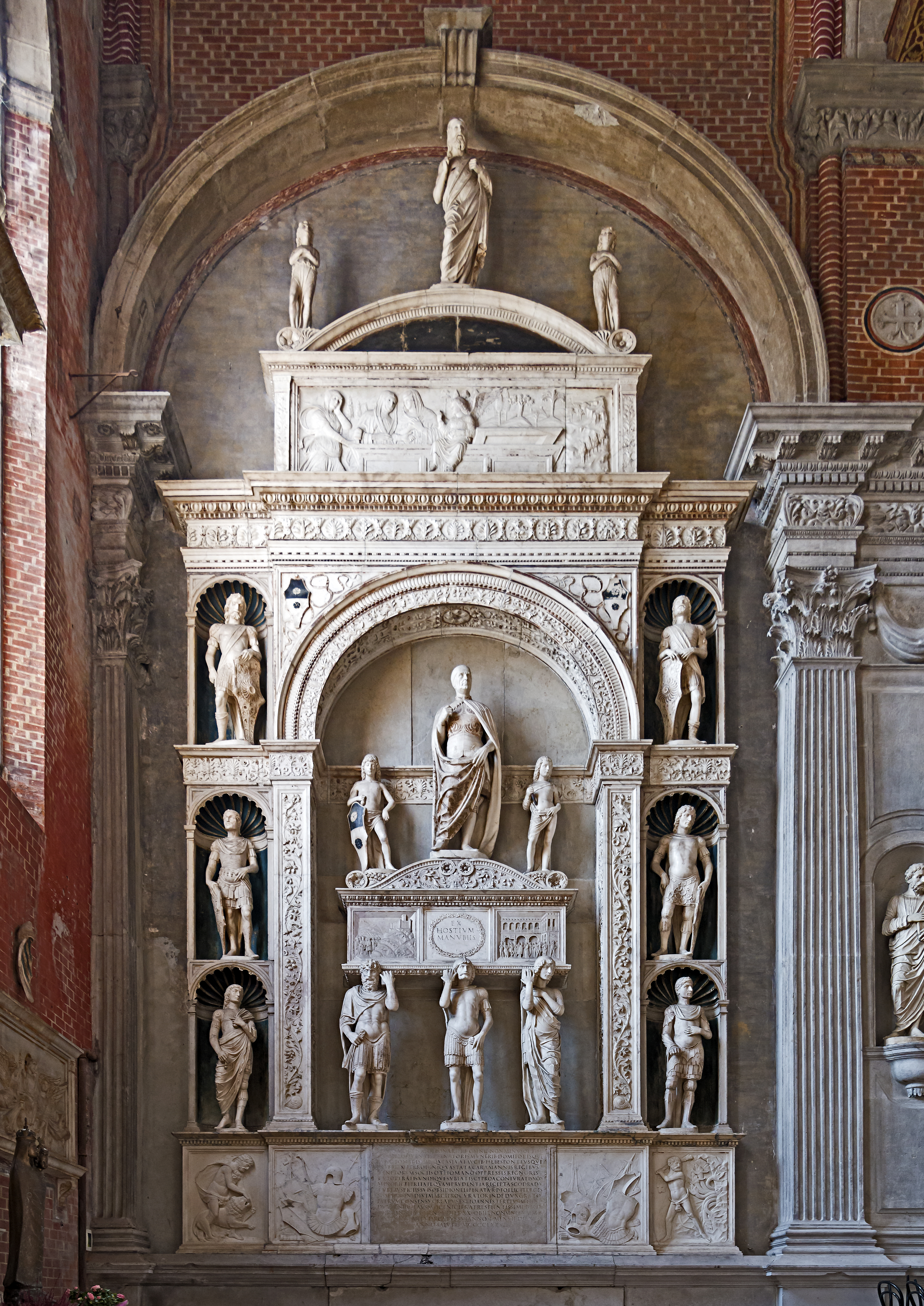
Tomb of Pietro Mocenigo, by Tullio & Pietro Lombardo

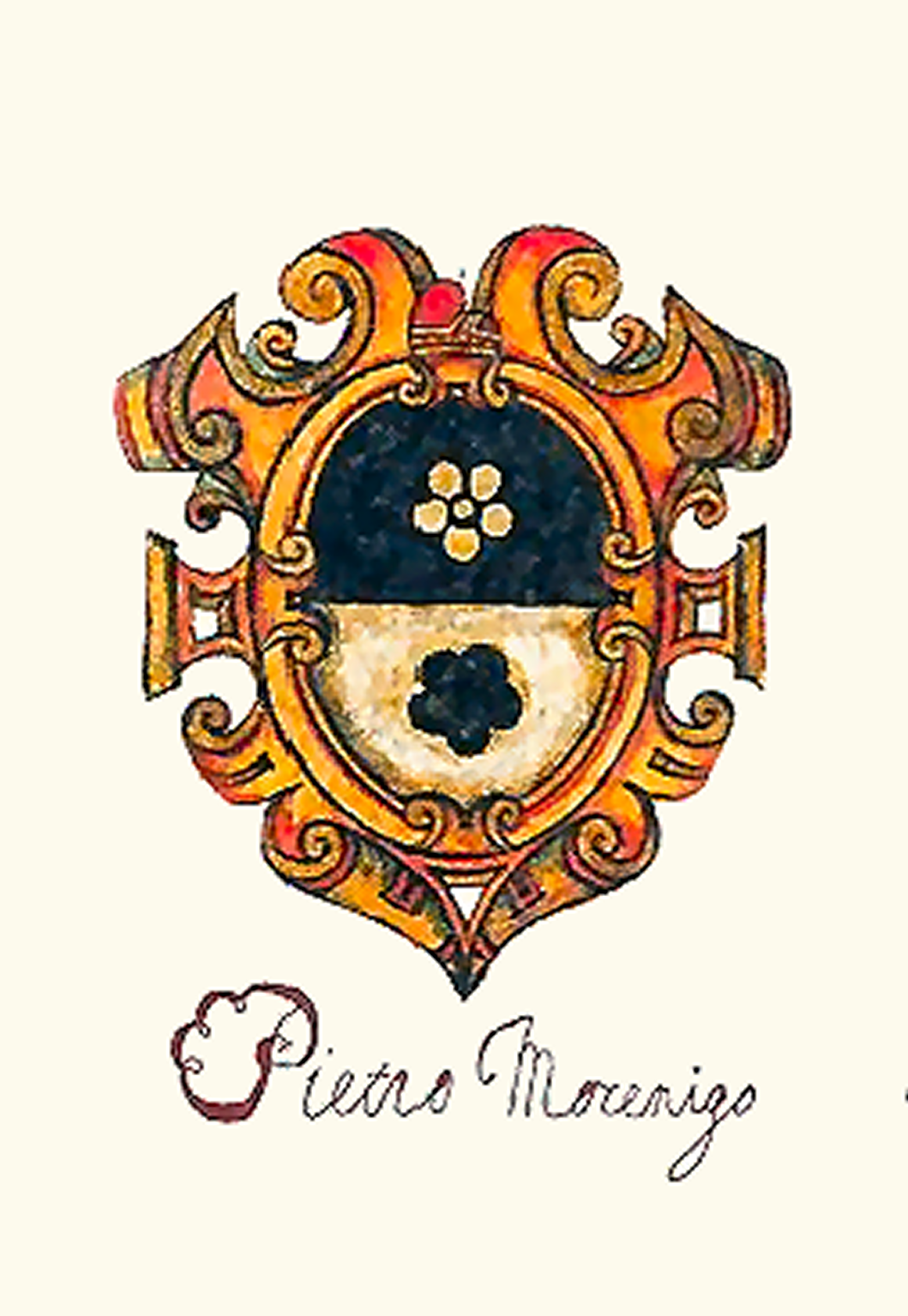
Coat of arms of Pietro Mocenigo

== See also ==
- Mocenigo family

== Sources ==
Military offices
Preceded by	Venetian Captain General of the Sea ? – 1474	Succeeded by Triadan Gritti
Political offices
Preceded by Nicolo Marcello	Doge of Venice; 1474–1476	Succeeded by Andrea Vendramin
