= Alessandro Rossi (textile industrialist) =

Italian entrepreneur and politician

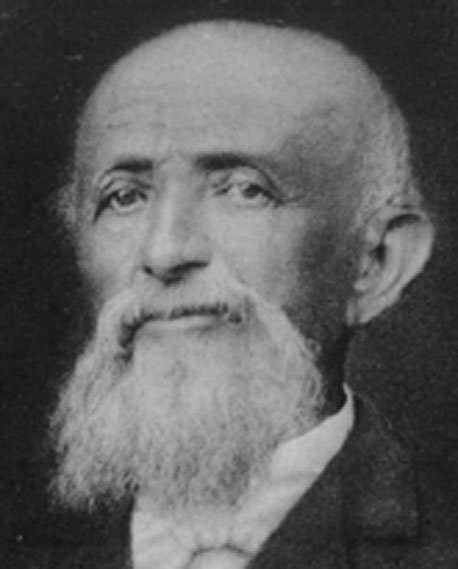
- Born: 21 November 1819
- Died: 28 February 1898
- Occupation: Entrepreneur

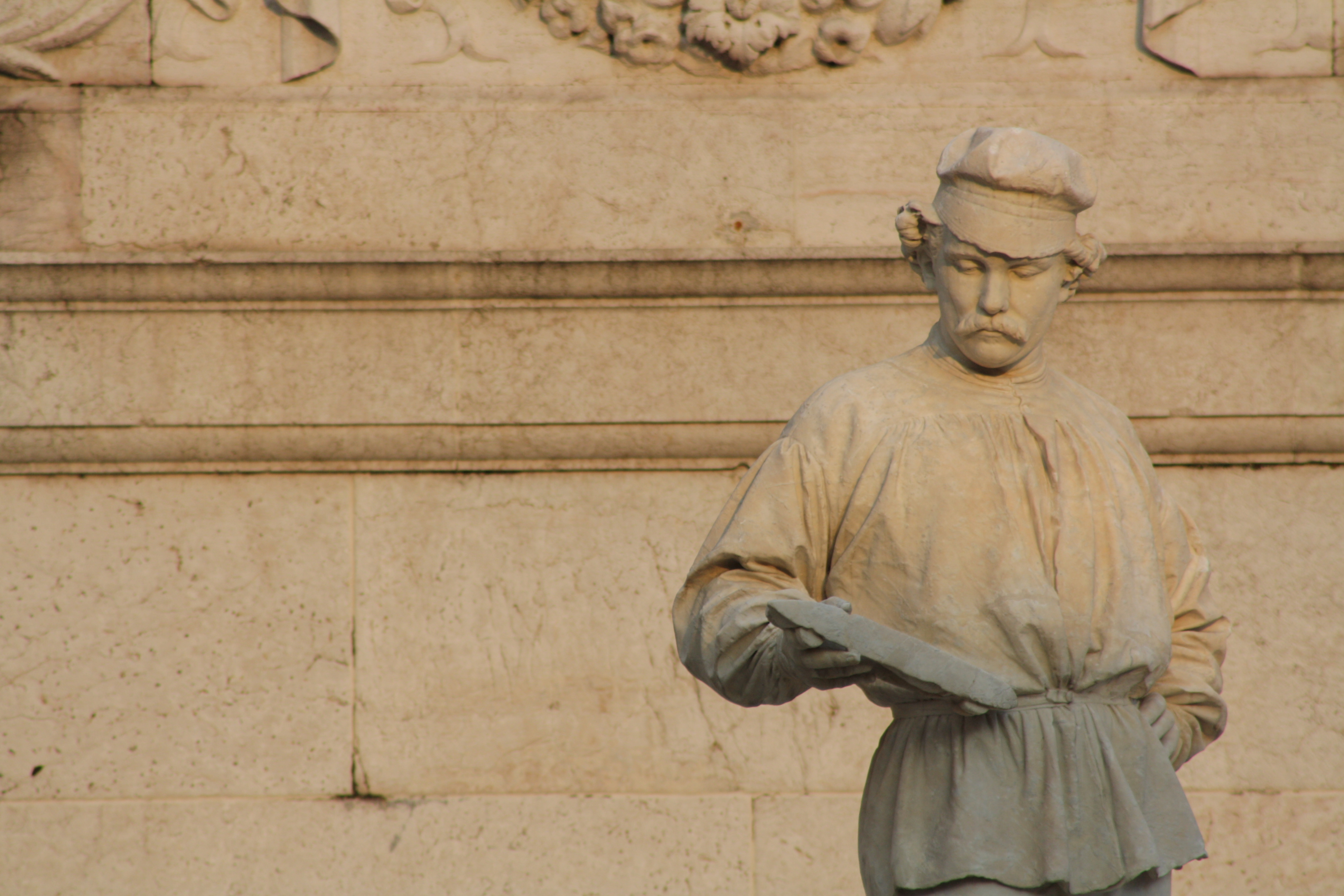
Monumento al Tessitore (Monument to the weaver) is a sculpture in Schio commissioned by Alessandro Rossi.

Alessandro Rossi (21 November 1819 in Schio – 28 February 1898 in Santorso) was an Italian textile industrialist and politician. He introduced technological innovation for manufacturing wool in Schio, Veneto. He inherited the wool mill Lanificio Rossi from his father Francesco Rossi, and converted the company into one of the main industries of Italy. He was deputy and senator of the Kingdom of Italy.

== Biography ==
Alessandro Rossi was the son of the Italian wool manufacturer Francesco Rossi, who founded Lanificio Rossi in 1817. Between 1845 and 1898, Alessandro Rossi developed and grew the company; by the 1880s, the company was the largest in Italy, with 5,000 employees.

Before taking over Lanificio Rossi, Alessandro Rossi visited advanced factories in England and France. When he became the chief of the family firm in 1845, he renewed the machinery of the wool mill, increasing its production capacity.

Alessandro Rossi inherited the mill from Francesco Rossi and built other factories, such as the six-storey building La Fabbrica Alta, designed by Belgian architect Auguste Vivroux and built between 1861 and 1862. He was inspired by the ideas of Robert Owen and Sir Titus Salt and built a workers' colony called New Schio. For Rossi, it was important to give workers a sense of personalization. He created aid associations, houses, schools, kindergartens, and shares in the company profits.

Rossi overcame the depression of the 1870s by establishing a system of autonomous management, dividing his company into four divisions forbidden to compete internally and with a board of directors concentrated in Milan.

In 1873, Rossi founded the "Consorzio della Fabbrica della Carta" (Paper Factory Consortium) in Arsiero. In 1878, he established a technical school in Vicenza. He also promoted the first hydroelectric plants in Italy, as they were a cheaper source than imported coal. He stimulated the creation of the Mechanical and Metallurgical Workers Assembly.

In 1892, Rossi resigned as President of his company, and he dedicated himself to political activities.

=== Support for protectionism in Parliament ===
In 1866, Alessandro Rossi was elected to Parliament. Four years later, he was elected as Senator. In 1876, he passed from a free trader to a representative of industrial protectionism. In 1870, Rossi was commissioned by the Council of Industry Trade for an official inquiry into Italian competitiveness. In 1874, he concluded that manufacturers needed state protection, recommending tax relief and customs duties.

Such as Souther agricultures, silk manufacturers, and Tuscan banks opposed to Rossi's propositions, he supported the creation of the Italian Cotton Association and the Mechanical and Metallurgical Workers Assembly. In this way, he was able to create the first bloc of business interests with brewers, leather workers, and silk and paper manufacturers.

Rossi won public support through newspapers that he owned. However, he was outnumbered in Parliament. From five hundred deputies, just fifteen defended business interests, and just three were manufacturers.

In 1876, Rossi fought Prime Minister Agostino Depretis' attempts to reduce tariffs and protectionism. Rossi hounded Depretis' government through the media until he agreed to help the industry. Depretis signed a treaty with France, but the treaty didn't achieve the protectionism that Rossi sought.

By the late 1880s, Rossi supported a broader protectionist initiative, promoting protection for Russian agriculture and American grains. In 1887, he defended a new general tariff, arguing that France needed Italian exports. He achieved broad support, and Parliament passed a protectionist general tariff.

=== Ideas ===
Rossi was opposed to state intervention in economic life. He was a leader in the industrialization of Italy after the unification and proposed a model for other industrialists. However, he defended protectionist measures, such as the establishment of high duties, between the 1870s and 1880s. In 1882, he promoted a political project that called for an alliance between industrialists, workers, and radical intellectuals to support stronger customs protections.

=== Buildings in Schio ===
Rossi commissioned or founded some of the most iconic places and monuments in Schio, such as Asilo Infanzia Alessandro Rossi for the worker's children, Monumeto al Tessitore, and Quartiere Operaio La Nuova Schio.
