= Andrea Vendramin =

Doge of Venice from 1476 to 1478

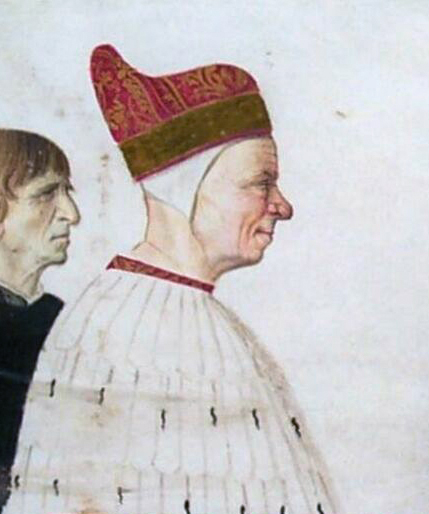
- Detail of portrait by Gentile Bellini

Doge of Venice
- In office 1476–1478
- Preceded by: Pietro Mocenigo
- Succeeded by: Giovanni Mocenigo

Personal details
- Born: 1393 Venice, Republic of Venice
- Died: 1478 (aged 84–85) Venice

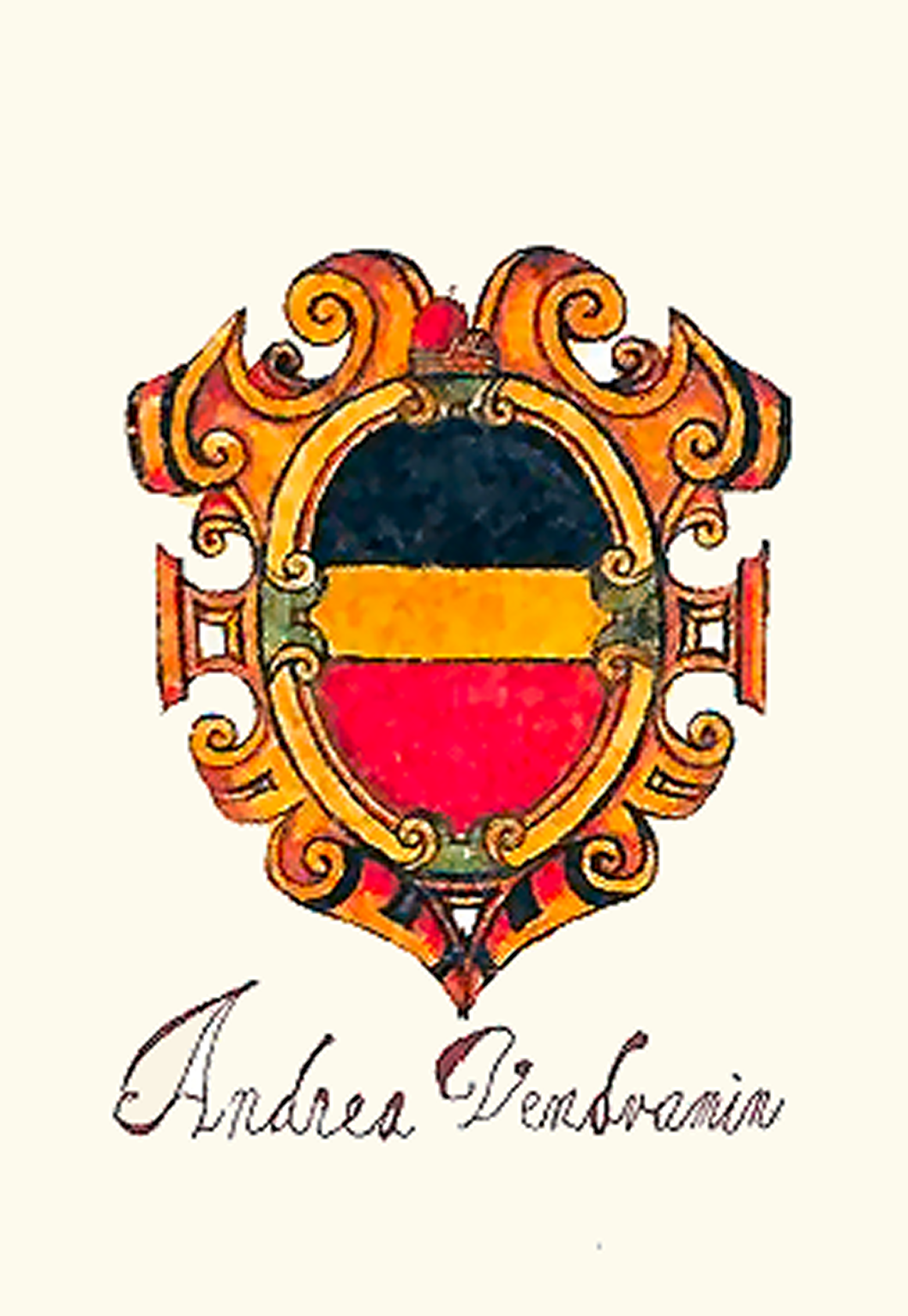
Coat of arms of Andrea Vendramin

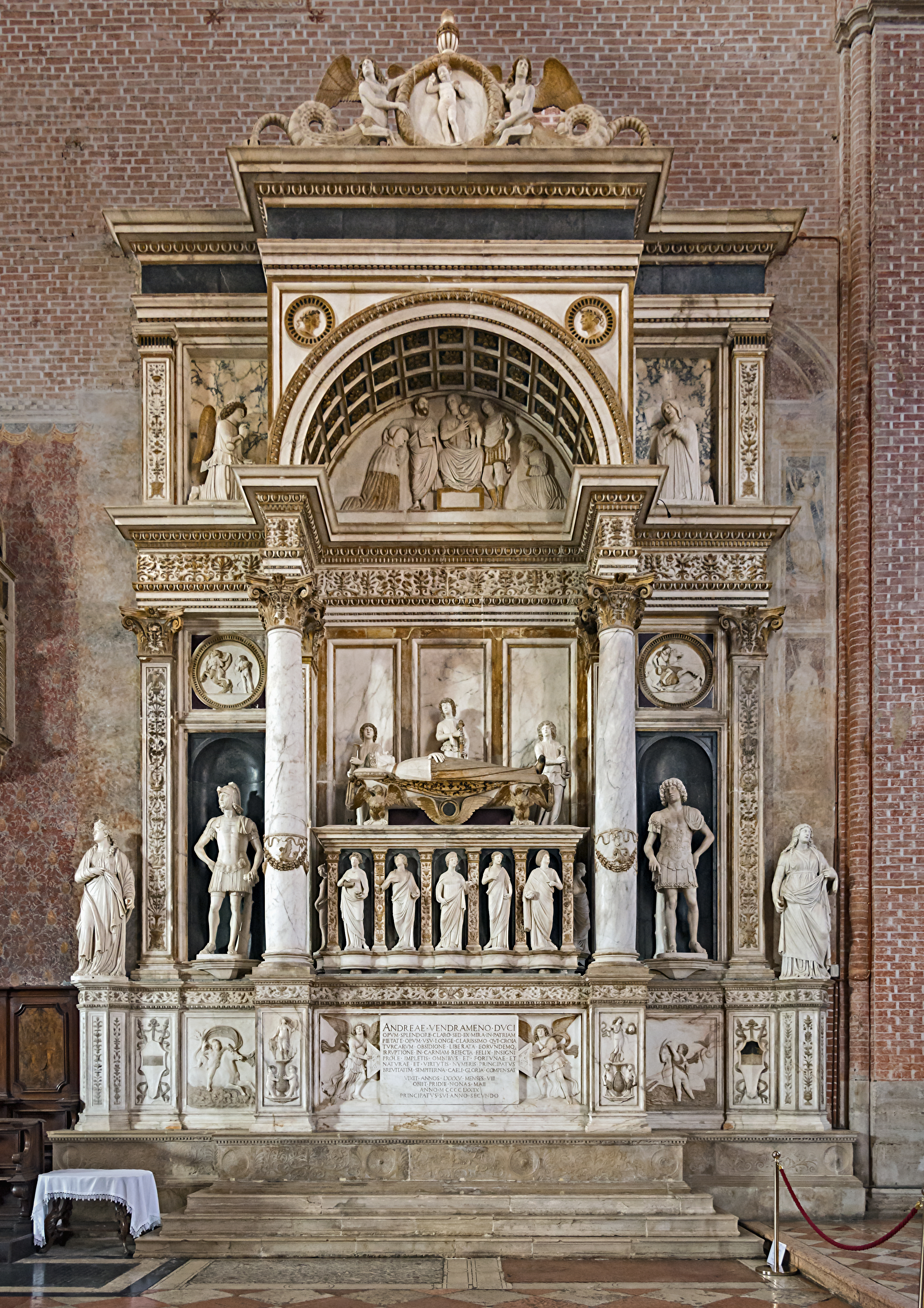
Tomb of Andrea Vendramin in Santi Giovanni e Paolo, Venice

Andrea Vendramin (1393 – May 5, 1478, both Venice) was Doge of Venice from 1476 until his death in 1478, at the height of Venetian power, the only member of the Vendramin family to do so. His mother, Maria Michiel, and his wife Regina Gradenigo, both came from Dogal families. He had served as Venetian Procurator in Rome, and his brief reign was largely concerned with the end of the Second Turkish–Venetian War. He probably died of plague.

The process of his election as Doge resulted in a divisive split in the council, that resulted in bad feelings: in 1477 Antonio Feleto was imprisoned, then banished, for remarking in public that the Council of the Forty-One must have been hard-pressed to elect a cheesemonger Doge. The diarist Malipiero noted that Andrea Vendramin at the time of his election was worth 160,000 ducats, after allowing for 6 to 7000 ducats with which he had endowed each of six daughters, in order to procure politically influential sons-in-law. In his youth, he and his brother Luca, in joint ventures, used to ship from Alexandria enough goods to fill a galley or a galley and a half, Malipiero recorded in retrospect: even his factors grew rich managing his affairs.

He has a large monumental wall-tomb, generally agreed to be "the most lavish funerary monument of Renaissance Venice", in the basilica of Santi Giovanni e Paolo, the usual burial-place of Doges, which was executed by Tullio Lombardo (1493), though Andrea del Verrocchio competed for the commission. It was originally intended for the church of Santa Maria dei Servi. However the portrait in the Frick Collection by Gentile Bellini, inscribed with his name, is now considered to be of his successor, Doge Giovanni Mocenigo.

He was interred in the Basilica di San Giovanni e Paolo, a traditional burial place of the doges. After Andrea's death, his widow married his brother, Luca.

Political offices
Preceded by Pietro Mocenigo	Doge of Venice; 1476–1478	Succeeded by Giovanni Mocenigo
