= Maglione =

- Comune
- Comune di Maglione
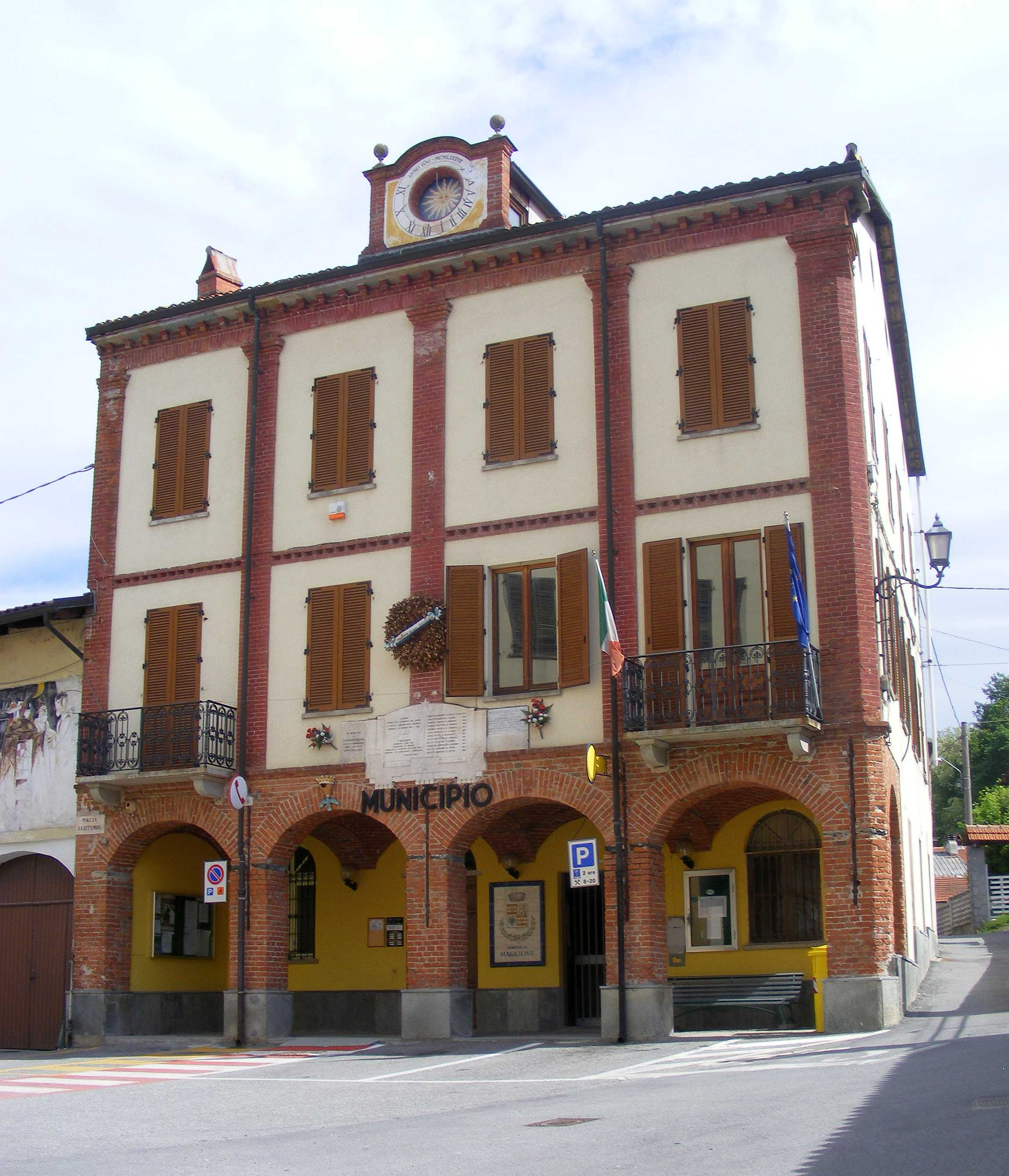
- Town hall

- Location within Italy Location within Piedmont
- Coordinates: 45°21′N 8°1′E
- Country: Italy
- Region: Piedmont
- Metropolitan city: Turin (TO)

Area
  - Total: 6.2 km^{2} (2.4 sq mi)

Population (December 2004)
  - Total: 497
  - Density: 80/km^{2} (210/sq mi)
- Time zone: UTC+1 (CET)
  - Summer (DST): UTC+2 (CEST)
- Postal code: 10030
- Dialing code: 0161

Maglione is a comune (municipality) in the Metropolitan City of Turin in the Italian region Piedmont, about 40 kilometres (25 mi) northeast of Turin. At 31 December 2004 it had a population of 497 and an area of 6.2 square kilometres (2.4 mi^{2}).

Maglione borders the following municipalities: Borgo d'Ale, Borgomasino, and Moncrivello.

== Population history ==
Historical population

Year	Pop.	±%
1861	989	—
1871	973	−1.6%
1881	1,103	+13.4%
1901	1,218	+10.4%
1911	1,148	−5.7%

Year	Pop.	±%
1921	1,003	−12.6%
1931	849	−15.4%
1936	814	−4.1%
1951	703	−13.6%
1961	596	−15.2%

Year	Pop.	±%
1971	550	−7.7%
1981	489	−11.1%
1991	495	+1.2%
2001	488	−1.4%

Source: Data from ISTAT
