= Adoration of the Shepherds (La Tour) =

Painting by Georges de La Tour

The Adoration of the Shepherds
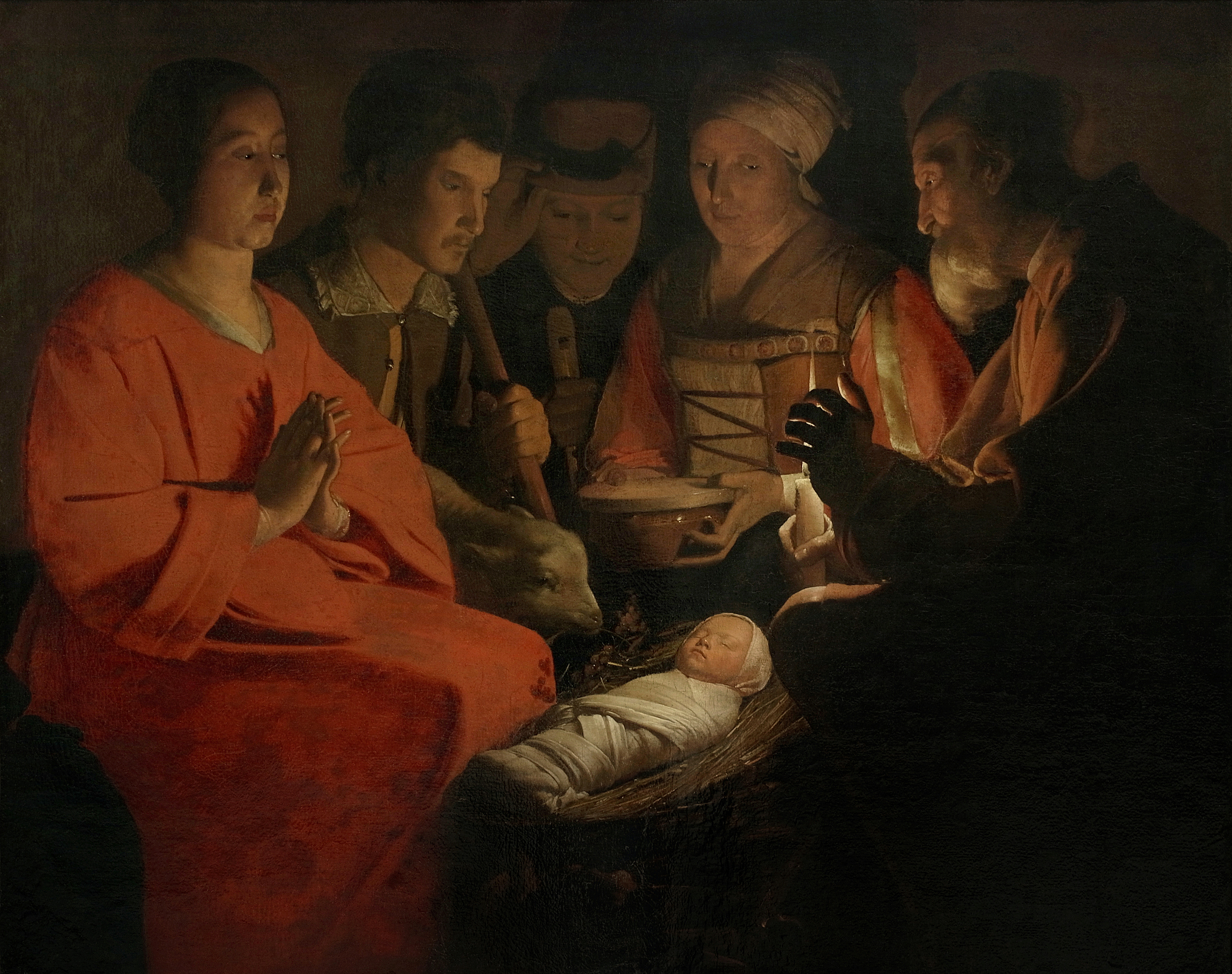
- Artist: Georges de La Tour
- Year: 1644
- Medium: oil on canvas
- Dimensions: 107 cm × 137 cm (42 in × 54 in)
- Location: Louvre, Paris

The Adoration of the Shepherds is a 1644 oil-on-canvas painting by the French artist Georges de La Tour. It is now in the Louvre Museum, in Paris, which purchased it in 1926.

== History and description ==
The tradition of representing the theme of the adoration of the shepherds, taken from the Gospel of Luke, was very common in 17th-century painting, specially among the Caravaggesque painters, who transformed this episode into a nocturnal scene by candle light. La Tour, a painter strongly influenced by Caravaggio, departed from the traditional iconography of the birth of Christ in this painting. At first glance, the scene shows a group of five people sitting around a child in the light of a lit candle. It is the only source of light that falls on the faces of the gathered people, but thanks to the obscuring hand of an old man, that is Saint Joseph, the viewer has the impression that the glow radiates from the Child Jesus. Each person seems lost in their thoughts and their eyes appear directed towards Jesus. Among the gathered there is a second woman, a maid, holding a vessel of water. There is no donkey or ox among the animals, only a sheep that appears chewing the hay. The child is lying in a wicker basket and not in a manger, as the tradition says.

The shepherds are dressed in clothes contemporary of the painter. The Virgin is enhanced by her red robe, on the left, while Joseph carries the light, a traditional symbol of truth.

== Provenance ==
The painting was probably commissioned by the citizens of the city of Lunéville, in 1644, as a tribute to the new governor, Maruiq de la Fert. For many years it was forgotten, until it was rediscovered in Amsterdam. It was purchased by the Louvre in 1926.
