= Joseph the Carpenter =

Painting by Georges de La Tour

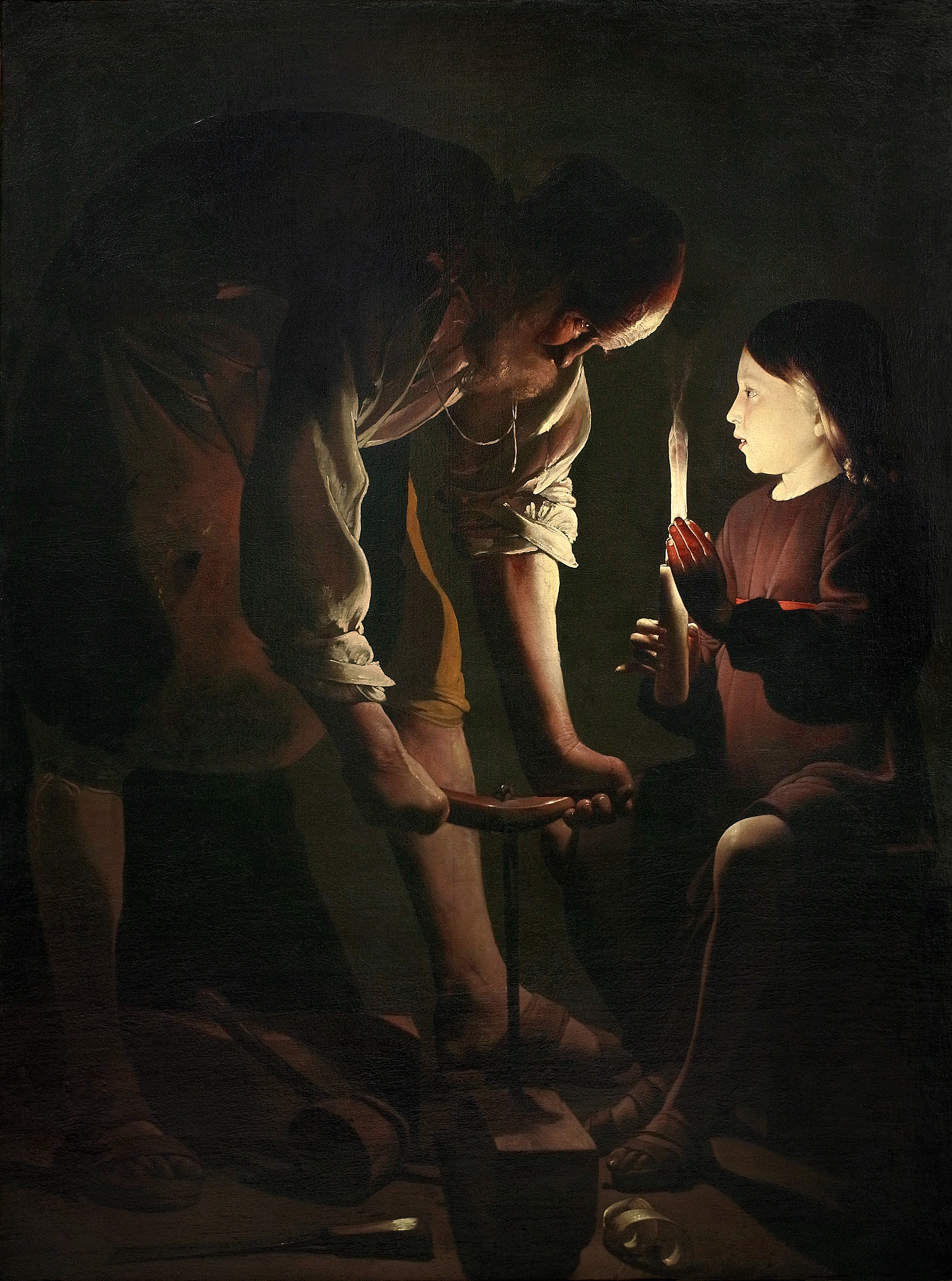
- Artist: Georges de La Tour
- Year: 1642
- Medium: Oil on canvas
- Dimensions: 130 cm × 100 cm (51 1/8 in × 31 3/4 in)
- Location: Louvre; Paris

Joseph the Carpenter is an oil painting by Georges de La Tour created circa 1642. The painting depicts a young Jesus with Saint Joseph, his earthly father.

Joseph drills a piece of wood with an auger. The shape of the auger reflects the shape of the Cross and the geometry of the wood arrayed on the floor, set cross-wise to the seated child Christ, is a foreshadowing of the crucifixion. John Rupert Martin writes that Jesus' patience represents "filial obedience and the acceptance of his destiny as martyr".

This painting, created ca. 1642, is one of several tenebrist paintings by La Tour. Others include The Education of the Virgin, the Penitent Magdalene, and The Dream of Saint Joseph. In all these works, a single, strong light source is a central element, surrounded by cast shadows. In both Joseph the Carpenter and The Education of the Virgin, the young Christ is represented, hand raised, as if in benediction, with the candlelight shining through the flesh as an allegorical reference to Christ as the "Light of the World."
