= Albi Apostles =

Painting series by Georges de La Tour

The Albi Apostles was a c.1620 set of thirteen oil-on-canvas paintings of Christ and his apostles by Georges de La Tour. Around 1690 they were bought by Jean-Baptiste Nualard, a canon of Albi Cathedral, for one of the cathedral's chapels. However, they were split up after 1795 and only five of the works survive, two at the Musée Toulouse-Lautrec (with copies of the lost paintings), two more in private collections and one at the Chrysler Museum of Art.

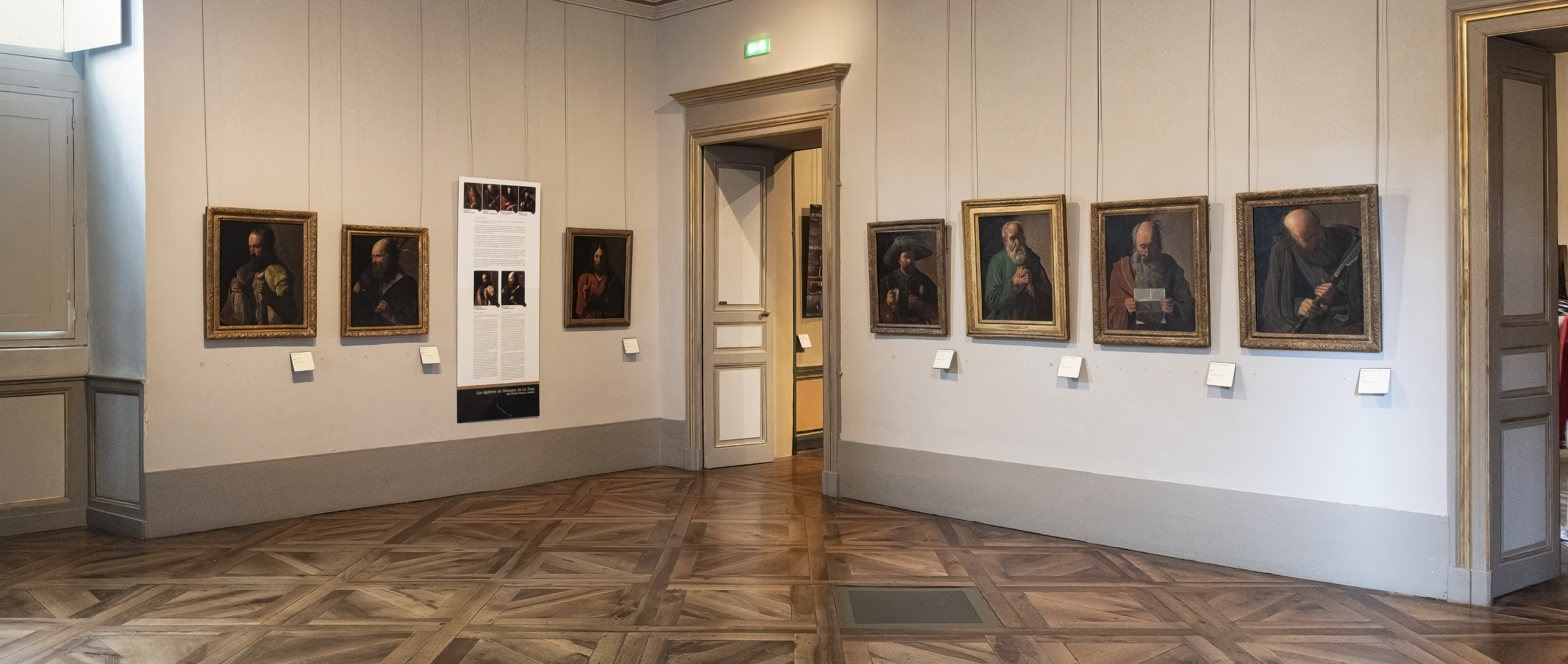
Albi - Musée Toulouse-Lautrec

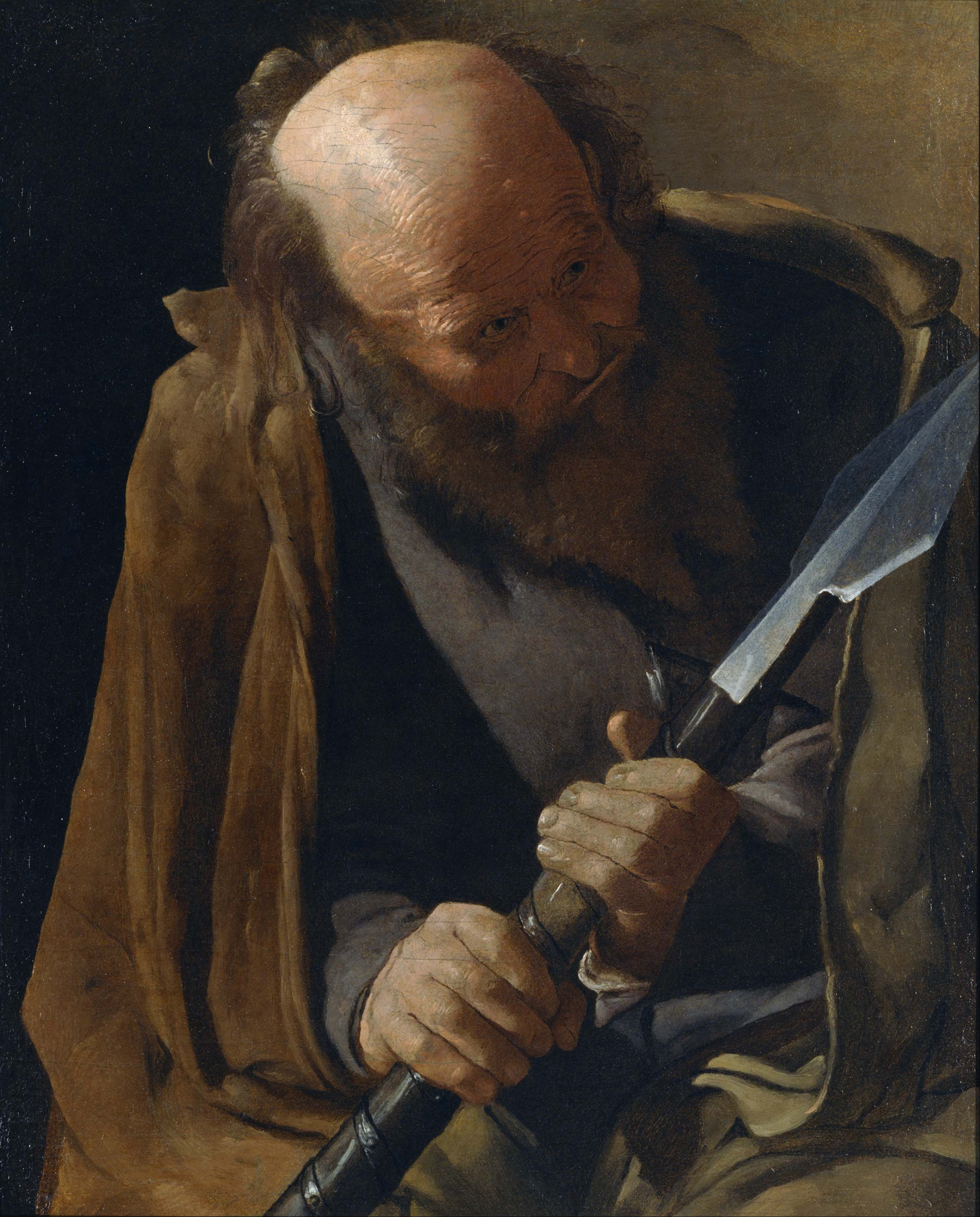
Saint Thomas

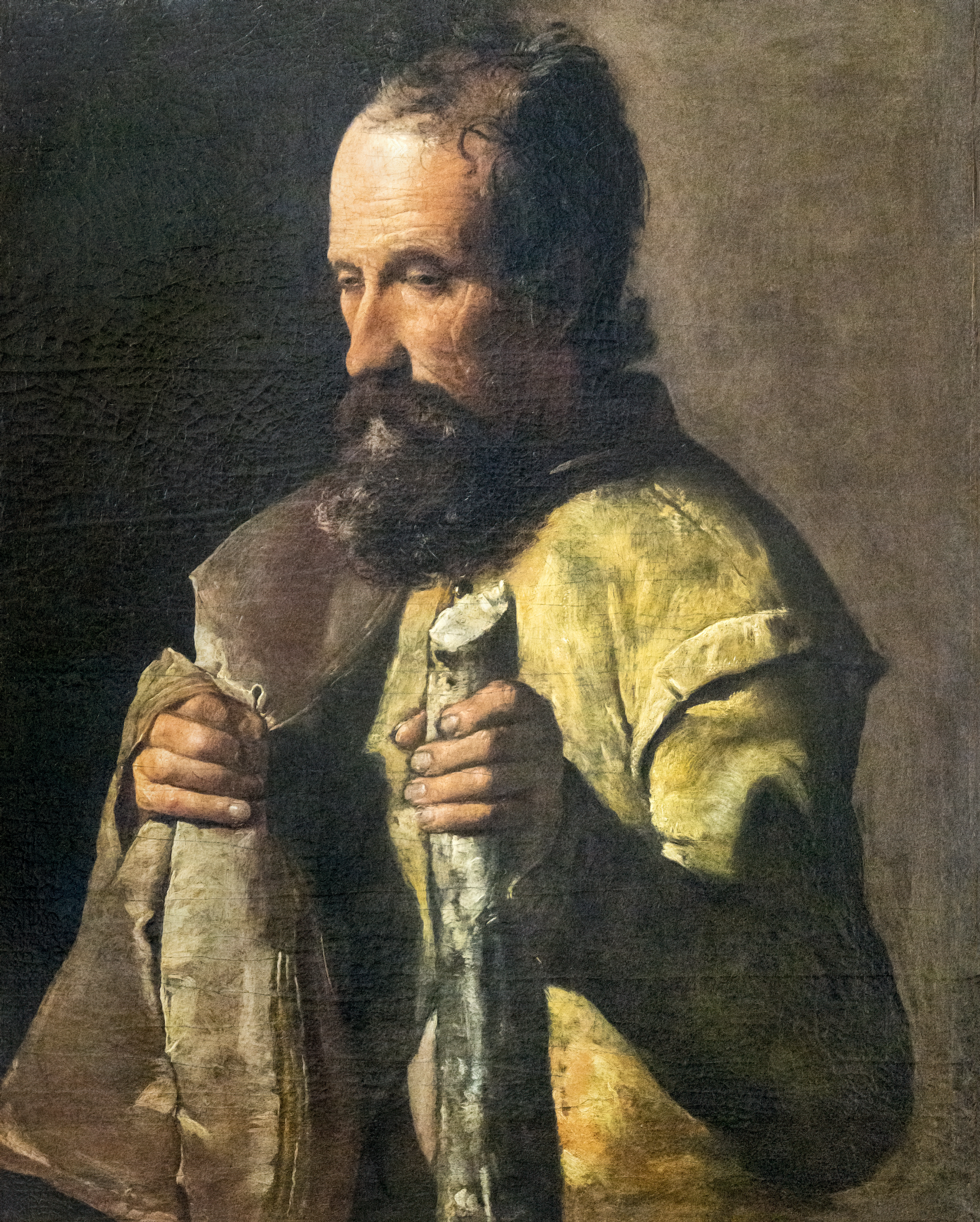
Saint James the Less

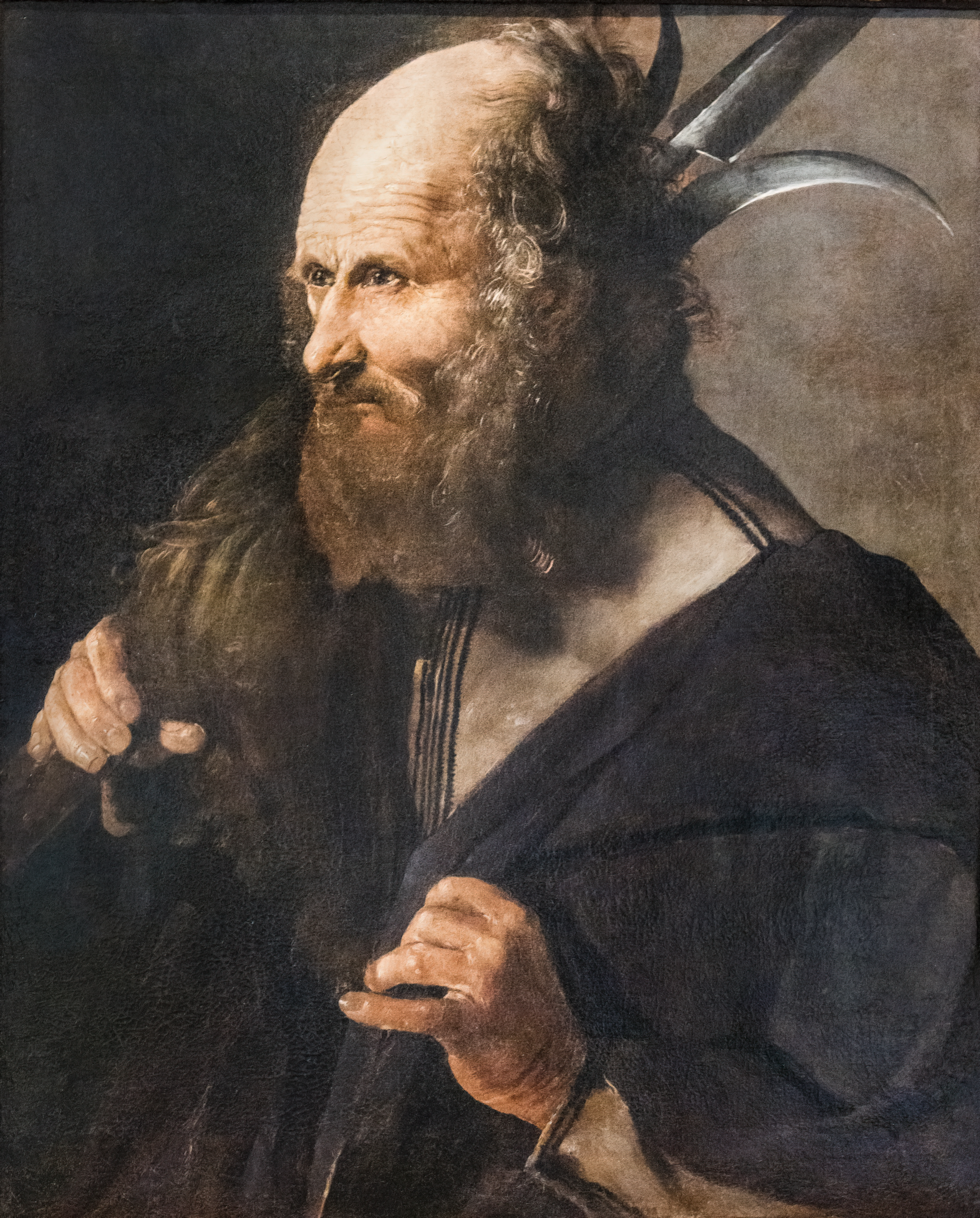
Saint Jude

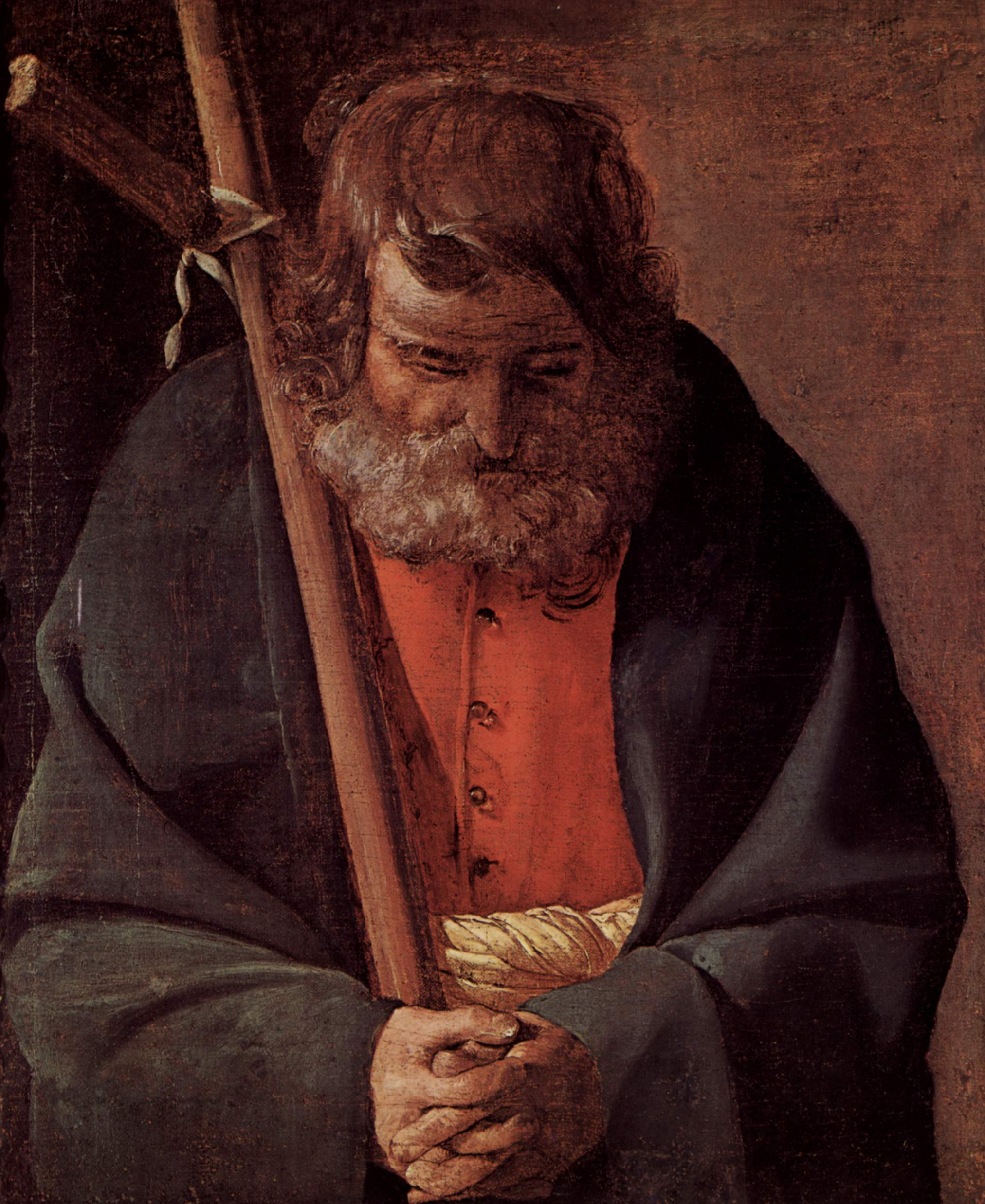
Saint Philip

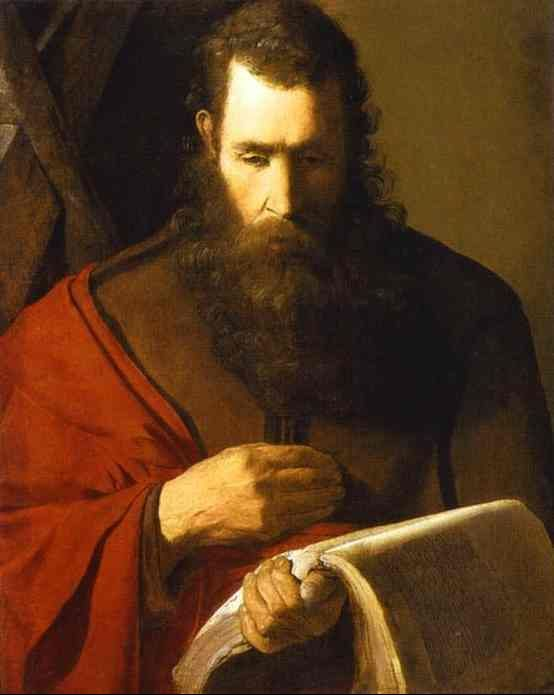
Saint Andrew
