= The Fortune Teller (La Tour) =

Painting by Georges de La Tour

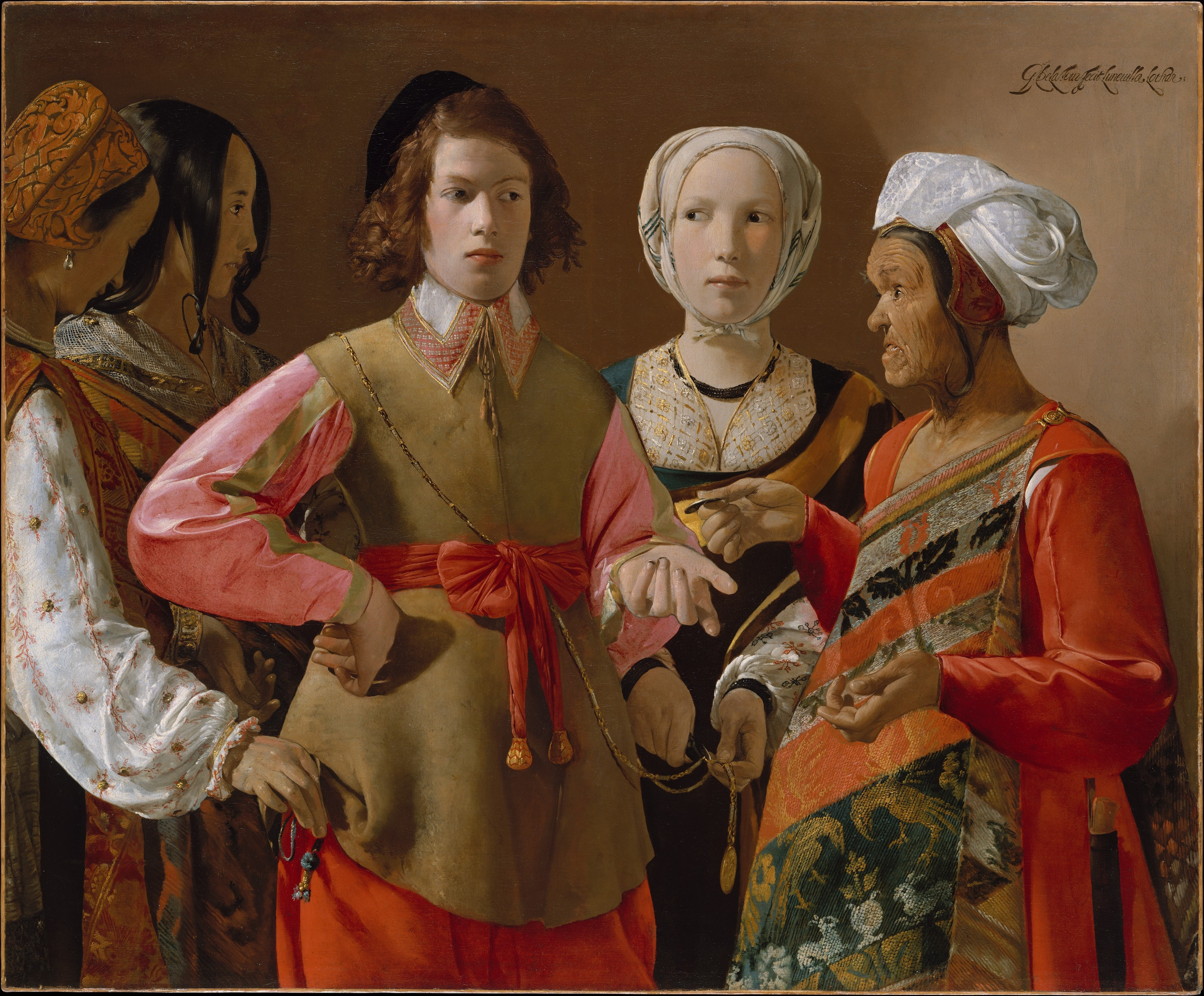
- Artist: Georges de La Tour
- Year: c. 1630
- Type: Oil painting
- Dimensions: 101.9 cm × 123.5 cm (40 1/8 in × 48 5/8 in)
- Location: Metropolitan Museum of Art, New York City

The Fortune Teller is an oil painting of circa 1630 by the French artist Georges de La Tour. The work was uncovered in about 1960 and purchased that year by the Metropolitan Museum of Art in New York.

François Georges Pariset described the painting in The Metropolitan Museum of Art Bulletin, attributing it to La Tour—a likely choice given the calligraphic signature at top right: "G. de La Tour Fecit Luneuilla Lothar" ("G[eorges] de La Tour made this, Lunéville, Lorraine"). Its authenticity has been questioned in the intervening years, notably by the English art historian Christopher Wright, but The Fortune Teller is generally accepted as La Tour's work.

== Description ==
The painting catches a moment in which a young man of some wealth is having his fortune told by the old woman at right; she takes the coin from his hand, not only in payment, but as part of the ritual in which she will cross his hand with it. Most or all of the women portrayed are Romani people, and, furthering the stereotype of the time, they are depicted as thieves. As the young man is engrossed in the fortune-telling—an act which, if discovered, would have repercussions for both him and the Romani people—the leftmost woman is stealing the coin purse from his pocket, while her companion in profile has a hand ready to receive the loot. The pale-faced girl on the boy's left is less clearly Romani, but is also in on the act as she cuts a medal worn by the boy from its chain. The figures in the painting are close together, as if in a play, and the composition may have been influenced by a theatrical scene.

The modern discovery of the painting is said to be traced to a French prisoner of war who viewed La Tour's works in a monograph and found a likeness with a painting hung in a relative's castle. A knowledgeable priest identified it as a La Tour work and informed the Louvre, which entered negotiations to buy the painting. The art dealer Georges Wildenstein outbid the museum, however, purchasing the painting in 1949 for 7.5 million francs. For a decade it remained with the dealer, until in 1960 the Metropolitan Museum of Art paid an undisclosed but "very high sum of money" for The Fortune Teller. How the painting had been able to leave France became a matter of controversy in the French press, and the writer André Malraux, then French Minister of Culture, attempted to explain to the National Assembly why the work did not end up in the Louvre. It later emerged that the export licence was signed by the art historian Germain Bazin, who was head of old master paintings at the Louvre; Wright speculates that he had sufficient doubt about the work not to want it for the Louvre.

== See also ==
- 100 Great Paintings
