= The Newborn Child =

Painting by Georges de la Tour

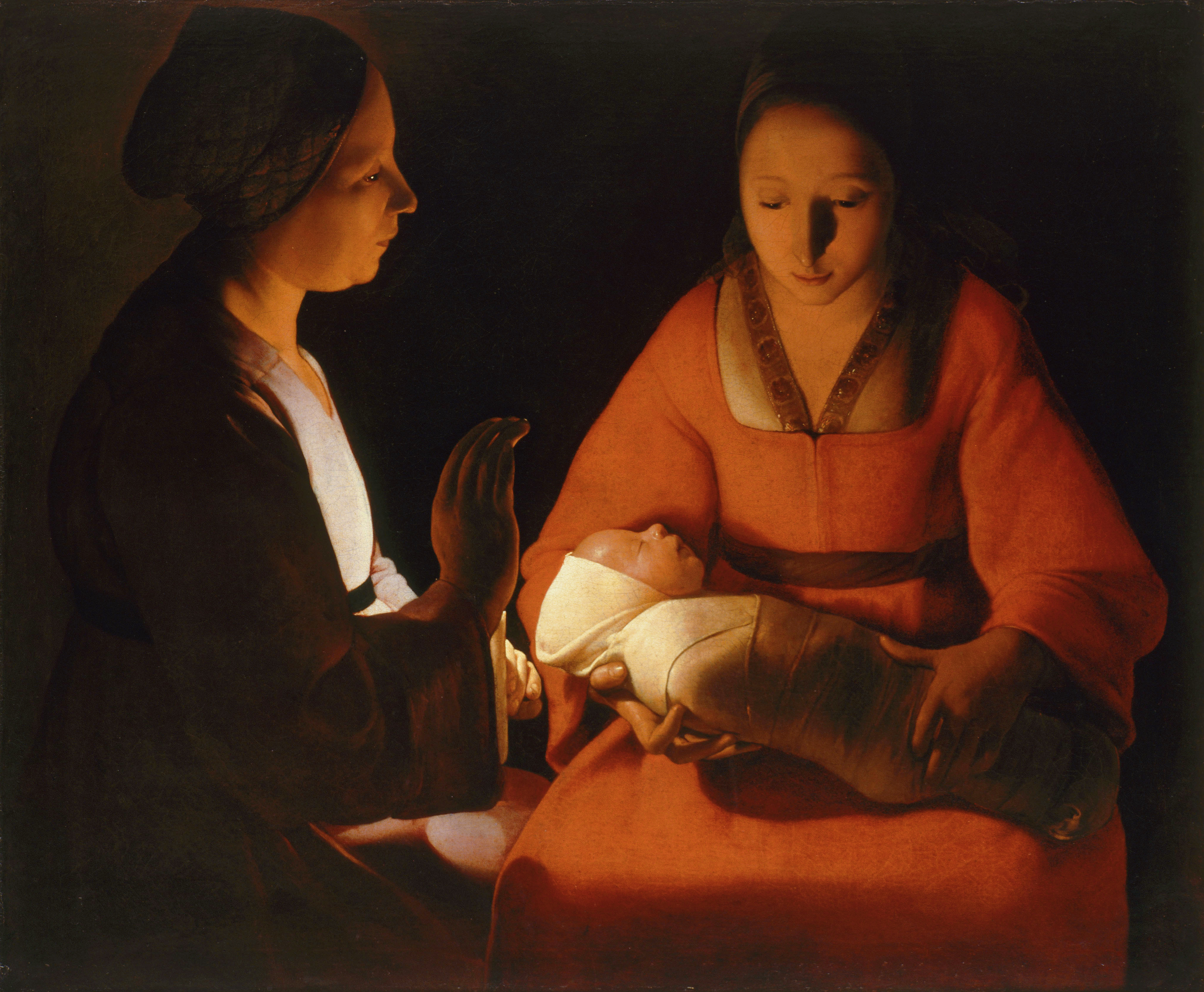
- Artist: Georges de La Tour
- Year: c. 1645–1648
- Medium: oil on canvas
- Dimensions: 76 cm × 91 cm (30 in × 36 in)
- Location: Museum of Fine Arts of Rennes

The Newborn Child is an oil-on-canvas painting created c. 1645–1648 by the French painter Georges de La Tour, now in the Museum of Fine Arts of Rennes in France. It is sometimes thought to be a representation of the Madonna and Child (with the left-hand woman as St Anne) in the form of a genre scene – it is thus also known as The Nativity.
