= The Card Sharp with the Ace of Diamonds =

c. 1638 painting by Georges de La Tour

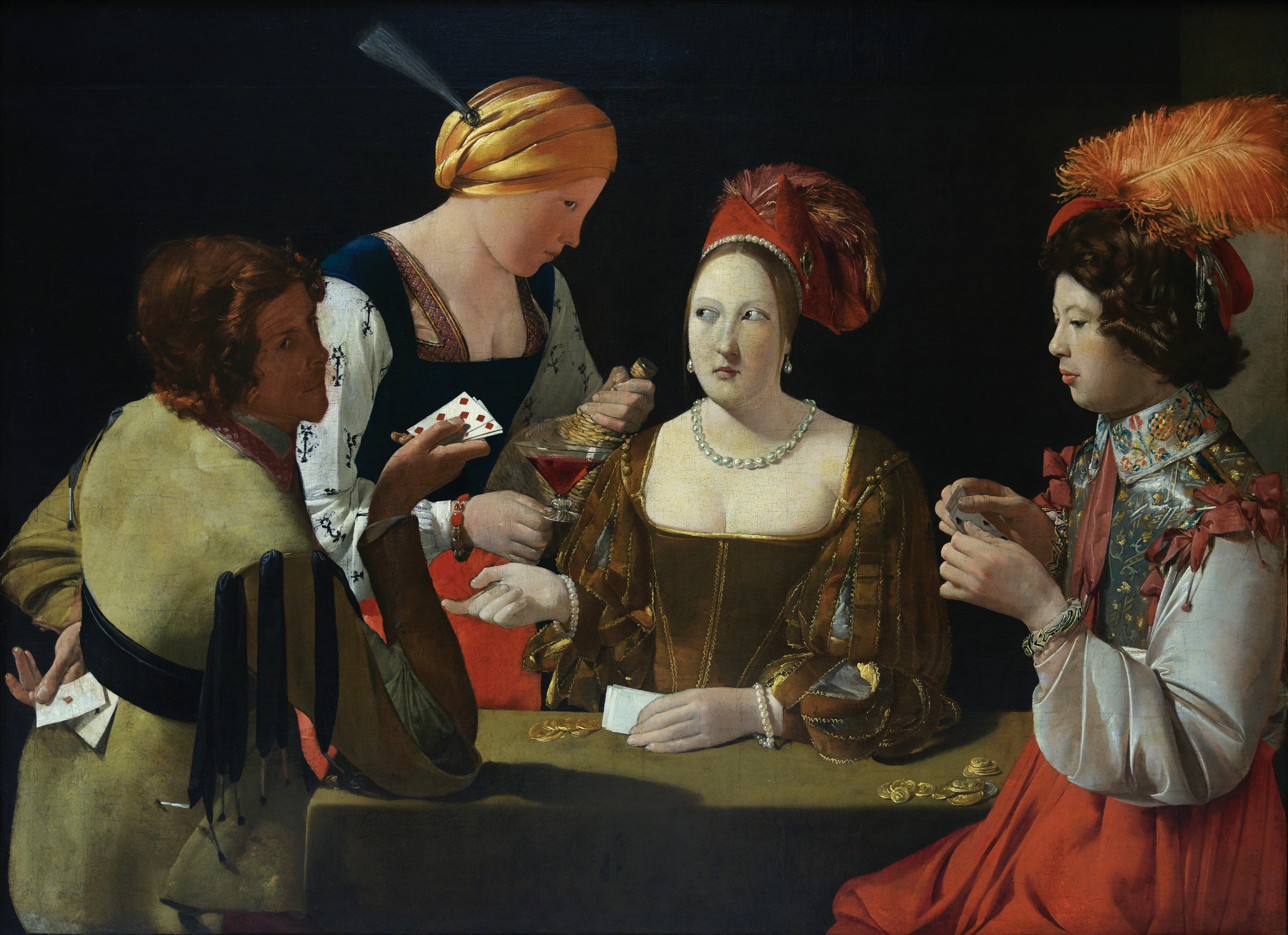
- Artist: Georges de La Tour
- Year: c. 1636–1638
- Medium: Oil on canvas
- Dimensions: 106 cm × 146 cm (42 in × 57 in)
- Location: Louvre; Paris

The Card Sharp with the Ace of Diamonds is an oil-on-canvas painting produced c. 1636–1638 by the French artist Georges de La Tour. It is now in the Louvre, which bought it in 1972. Though its commissioner is unknown, it is signed Georgius De La Tour fecit under the card sharp's elbow and in the shadow of the tablecloth.

The work depicts a card game in which the well-to-do young man on the right is being fleeced of his money by the other players, who both appear to be complicit in the scheme. The card sharp on the left is actually in the process of retrieving the ace of diamonds from behind his back.

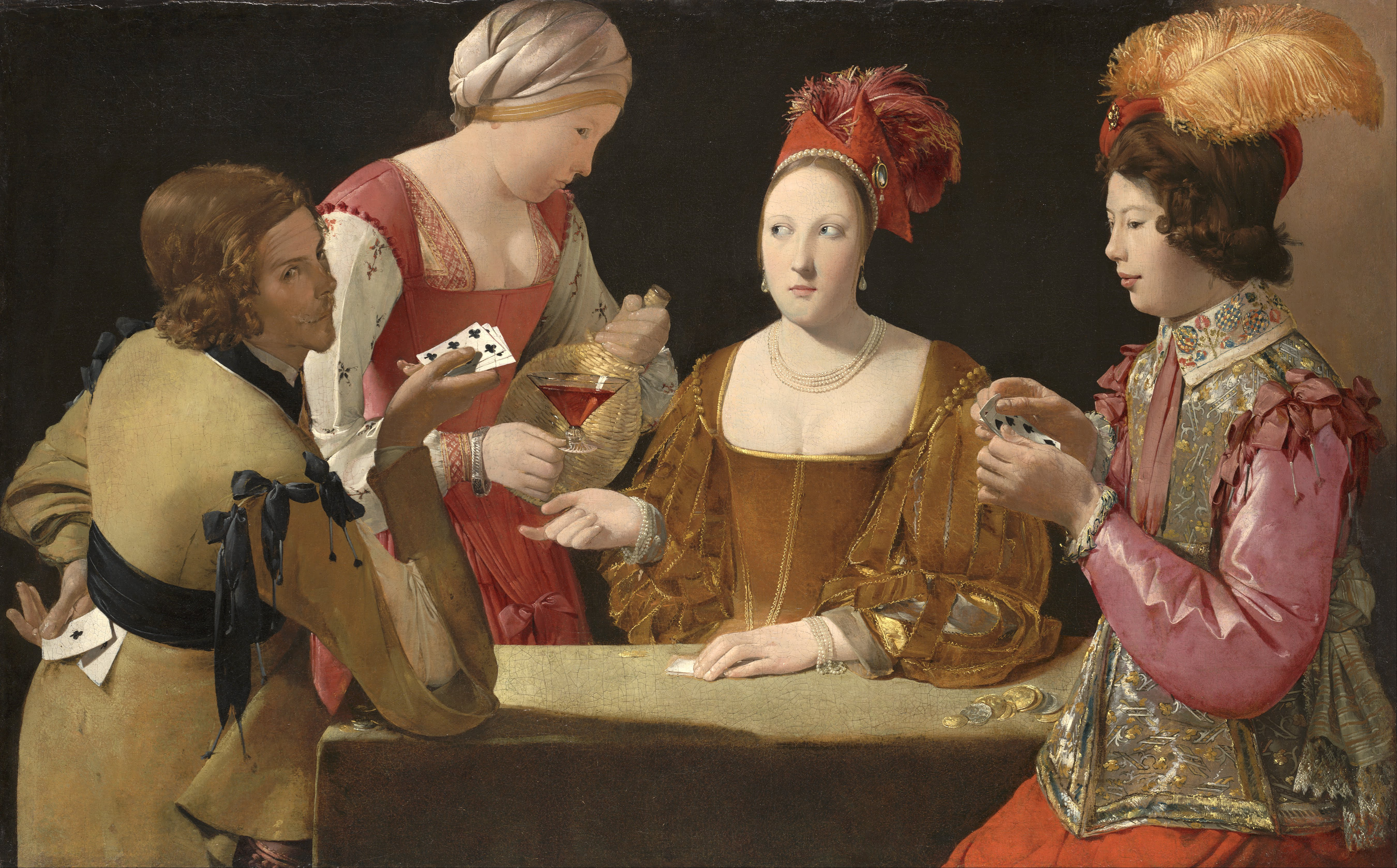
Cheat with the Ace of Clubs, 1630–1634, Kimbell Art Gallery

The painting is one of two versions of the composition by de la Tour. The other version, known as The Cheat with the Ace of Clubs, with "abundant variations in details of color, clothing, and accessories" was purchased in 1981 by the Kimbell Art Foundation and is in the Kimbell Art Museum in Fort Worth, Texas.

== Bibliography (in French) ==
- Hermann Voss, « Tableaux à éclairage diurne de G. de La Tour », Formes, Paris, Éditions des Quatre Chemins, no XVI, juin 1931, p. 98-99 (lire en ligne [archive])
- Pierre Rosenberg et François Macé de l'Épinay, Georges de La Tour : Vie et œuvre, Fribourg, Office du livre, 1973, p. 126-127 (« Catalogue raisonné, no 29 »)
- Jacques Thuillier, Tout l'œuvre peint de Georges de La Tour, Paris, Flammarion, coll. « Les Classiques de l'Art », 1973 (réimpr. 1985), 104 p. (ISBN 2-08-010258-3), p. 91 (« Catalogue des œuvres, no 30 »)
- Pierre Rosenberg et Marina Mojana, Georges de La Tour : catalogue complet des peintures, Paris, Bordas, coll. « Fleurons de l'Art », 1992 (ISBN 978-2040195984)
- Jean-Pierre Cuzin et Pierre Rosenberg (préf. Jacques Thuillier), Georges de La Tour : Paris, Galeries nationales du Grand Palais, 3 octobre 1997-26 janvier 1998, Paris, Réunion des Musées nationaux, 1997, 320 p. (ISBN 2-7118-3592-8)
- Jean-Pierre Cuzin et Dimitri Salmon, Georges de La Tour : Histoire d'une redécouverte, Paris, Gallimard, Réunion des musées nationaux, coll. « Découvertes Gallimard / Arts » (no 329), 1997, 176 p. (ISBN 2-07-030053-6)
- Jacques Thuillier, Georges de La Tour, Paris, Flammarion, coll. « Les Grandes monographies », 1992 (réimpr. 2012), 318 p. (ISBN 978-2-0812-86085)
- Emanuele Castellani, Antonio Fazzini, Chiara Lachi et Daniela Parenti, Georges de La Tour : Le Tricheur à l'as de carreau, t. 16, Paris, Le Monde, coll. « Le Musée du Monde », 2014 (ISBN 978-2-36156-146-8)

== Bibliography (in English) ==
- Conisbee, Philip. “An Introduction to the Life and Art of Georges de La Tour,” in Philip Conisbee (ed.), Georges de La Tour and His World, exhibition catalogue Washington, DC, National Gallery of Art; Fort Worth, Kimbell Art Museum 1996, pp. 13–147.
- Judovitz, Dalia. Georges de La Tour and the Enigma of the Visible, New York, Fordham University Press, 2018. ISBN 0-82327-744-5; ISBN 9780823277445. p11, 39-42, 68, plate 13.
