= Musée des Beaux-Arts de Rennes =

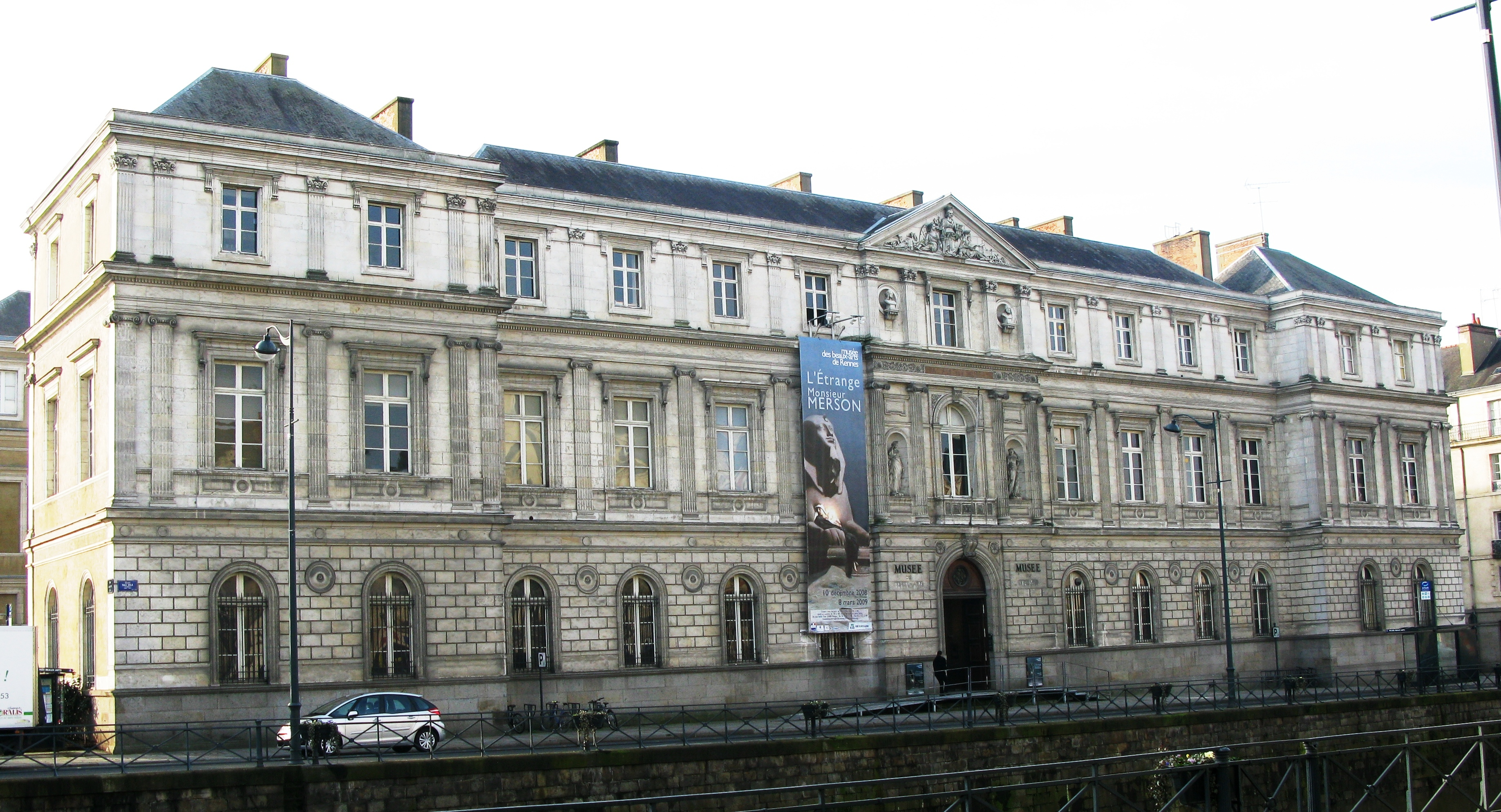

- Location within Rennes
- Established: 1794
- Location: 20, Quai Emile Zola; 35000 Rennes, France
- Coordinates: 48.109444°N 1.675°W
- Type: Art museum
- Visitors: 86,000 (2014)
- Website: www.mbar.org

The Musée des Beaux-Arts de Rennes is a municipal museum of fine arts in the French city of Rennes, the capital of Brittany. Its collections range from ancient Egyptian antiquities to modern art and make the museum one of the most important in France outside Paris, notably for its holdings of paintings and drawings.

== History ==
The museum was established in 1794 during the French Revolution, like most of the main French museums. Its first collections were the confiscated artworks of the churches and public buildings of Rennes. However, the majority of the present holdings come from the private collection of Christophe-Paul de Robien (1698–1756), a president of the Parlement of Rennes, which was at the time of the Revolution one of the largest of its kind in Europe. It comprised drawings, prints, paintings, antiques and sculptures. The museum's collections continued to expand during the 19th and the 20th centuries thanks to donations and acquisitions. The building housing the museum was built between in 1847 and 1855, but it is only since 1911 that it has been entirely devoted to the museum's collections. The building and its exhibition galleries have been restored and modified several times.

== Collections ==
=== Paintings ===
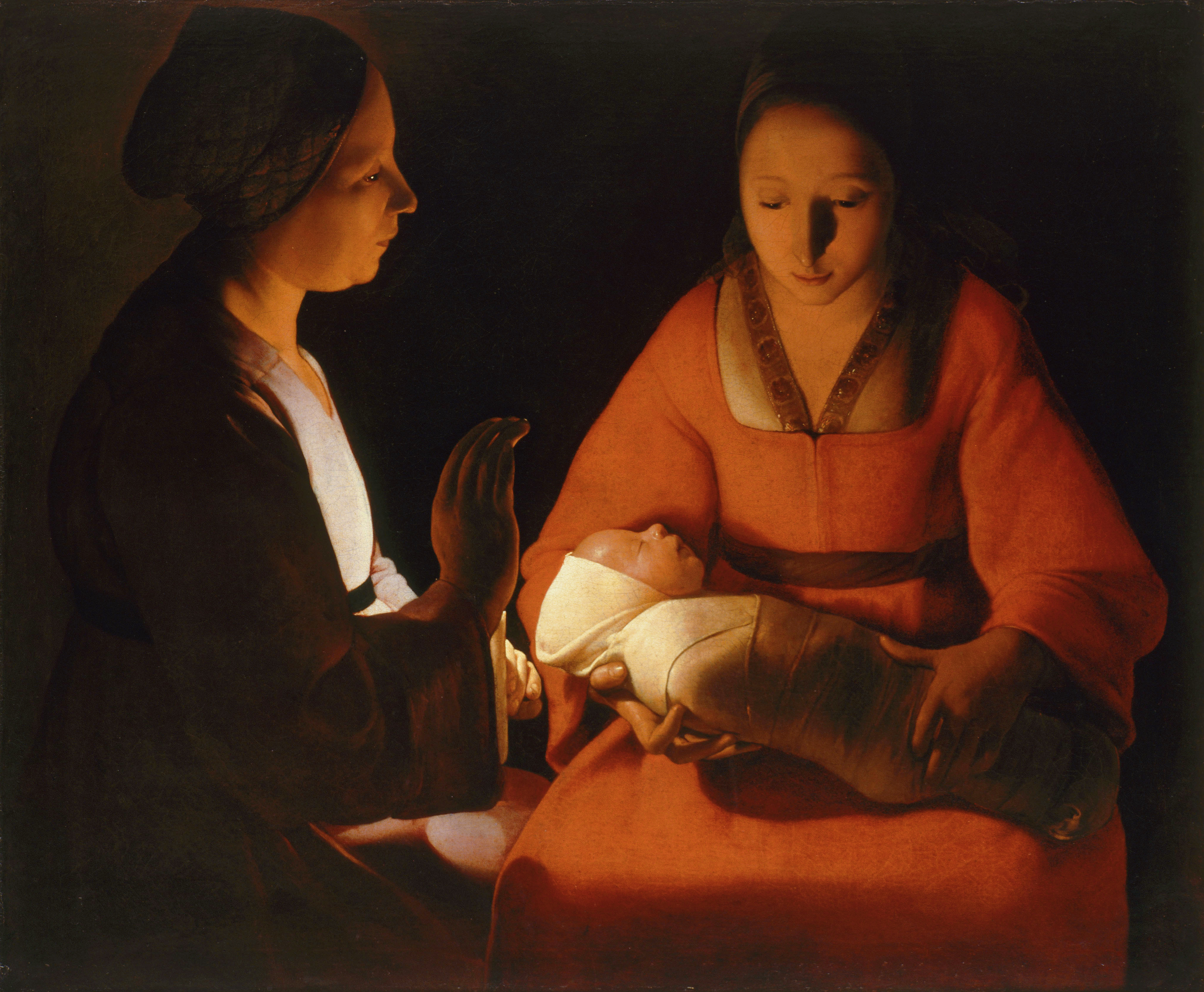
The Newborn Child, Georges de La Tour, oil on canvas, 1645–1648.

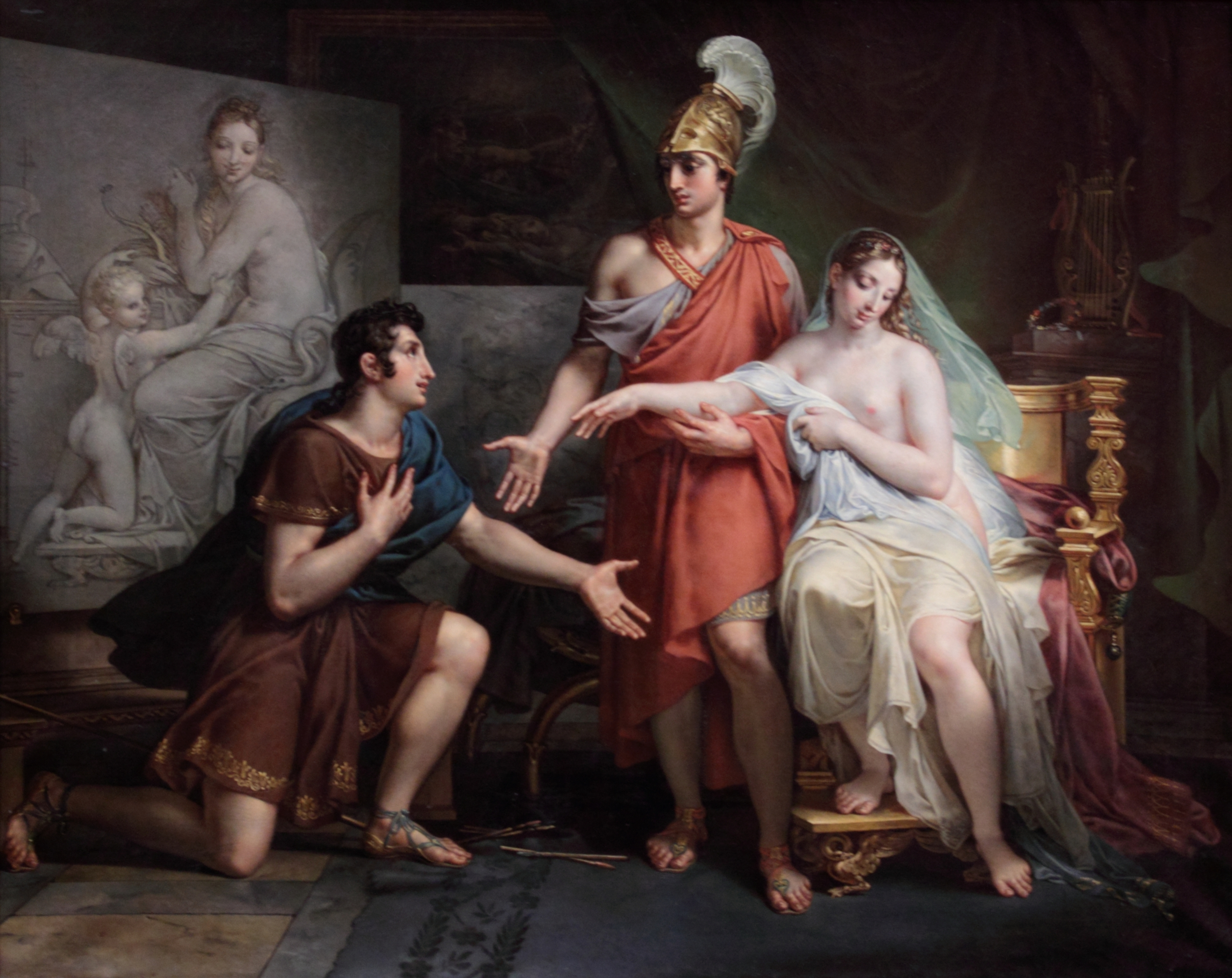
Alexander the Great Giving Campaspe to Apelles by Charles Meynier, 1822

The collection includes paintings created between the 14th and 20th centuries. Primitive and Renaissance painting is represented with works by Paris Bordone, Paolo Veronese, Leandro Bassano, Maarten van Heemskerck and the School of Fontainebleau.

The 17th century is one of the highlights of the museum. Holdings for this century include French paintings by Philippe de Champaigne, Le Nain, Eustache Le Sueur, Laurent de La Hyre, Charles Le Brun, Charles de La Fosse and Georges de La Tour, and by some of the rarest names. Italian painting is featured with Ludovico Carracci, Guercino, Pietro da Cortona, Guido Reni and also Luca Giordano. Dutch and Flemish painting is represented by Rubens, Jacob Jordaens, Gaspar De Crayer, Peter Lely, Adriaen Brouwer, Adriaen van Ostade, Matthias Stom, Gerrit van Honthorst, Pieter Leermans and Frans Snyders.

The 18th-century collections focuses on the French and Italian schools with valuable paintings by Jean-Siméon Chardin, Jean-Baptiste Greuze, François Boucher, Francesco Solimena, Francesco Guardi and Corrado Giaquinto.

19th-century holdings are important with some 300 paintings in the collection. At that time Brittany was a popular destination for academist and modern painters (like Gauguin) and the museum's 19th-century paintings reflect this interest in the region's landscapes and folklore. For this century the museum displays works by Camille Corot, Eugène Boudin, Johan Barthold Jongkind, Gustave Caillebotte, Alfred Sisley, Paul Gauguin, Paul Sérusier, Georges Lacombe, Émile Bernard and Maurice Denis.

20th-century painting and sculpture, notably the first half of the century with such movements as Fauvism, Cubism, abstraction and Surrealism, is well represented with works by Raoul Dufy, Pablo Picasso, Robert Delaunay, Juan Gris, Alberto Magnelli, František Kupka, René Iché, Yves Tanguy and Nicolas de Staël.

=== Drawings ===
The drawings holdings are one of the treasures of the museum as they include very valuable pieces and rare names, mainly thanks to the Robien collection. Artworks in this section include drawings by Filippo Lippi, Leonardo da Vinci, Botticelli, Donatello, Domenico Ghirlandaio, Michelangelo, Giovanni Bellini, Albrecht Dürer, Corregio, Pontormo, Giulio Romano, Parmigianino, Nicolo dell'Abbate, Federico Barocci, Rubens, Pietro da Cortona, Simon Vouet, Pierre Puget, Rembrandt, Salvator Rosa, Antoine Watteau, Sebastiano Ricci, Pierre Bonnard, Maurice Denis, Édouard Vuillard and Pablo Picasso.

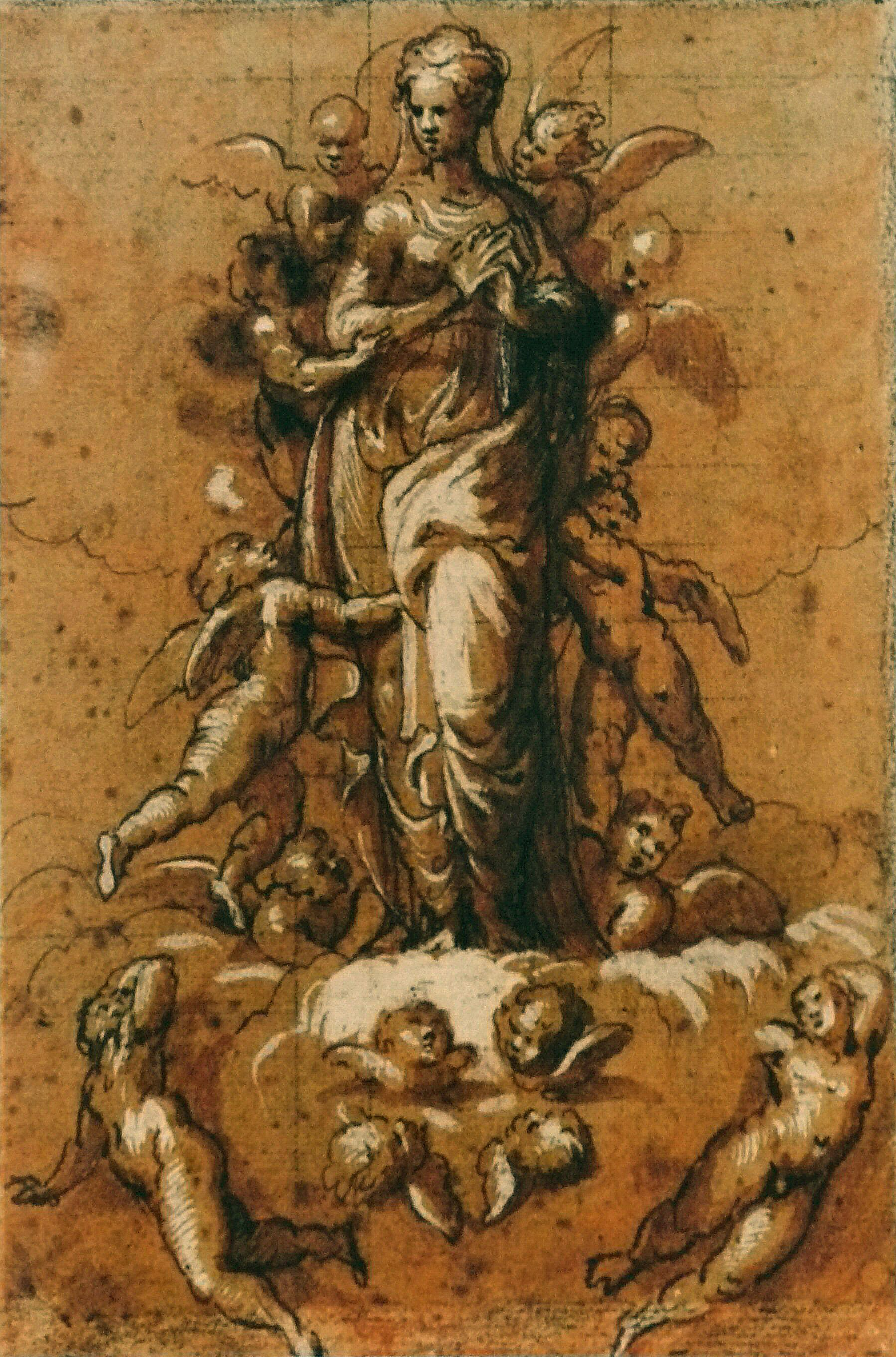
The Immaculate Conception, Bernardino Campi, 1560s.

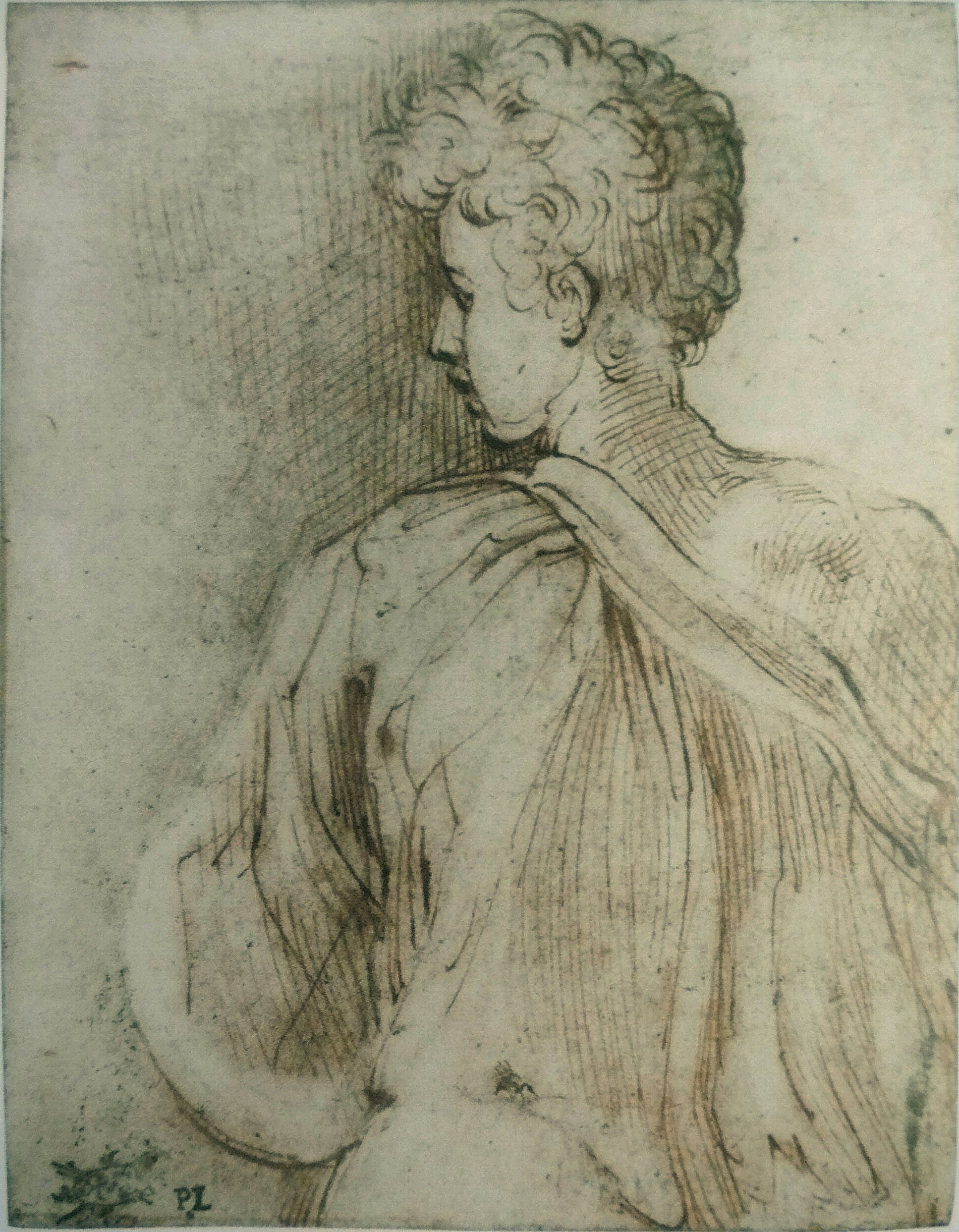
A Young Man's Back, Parmigianino, 1520s.

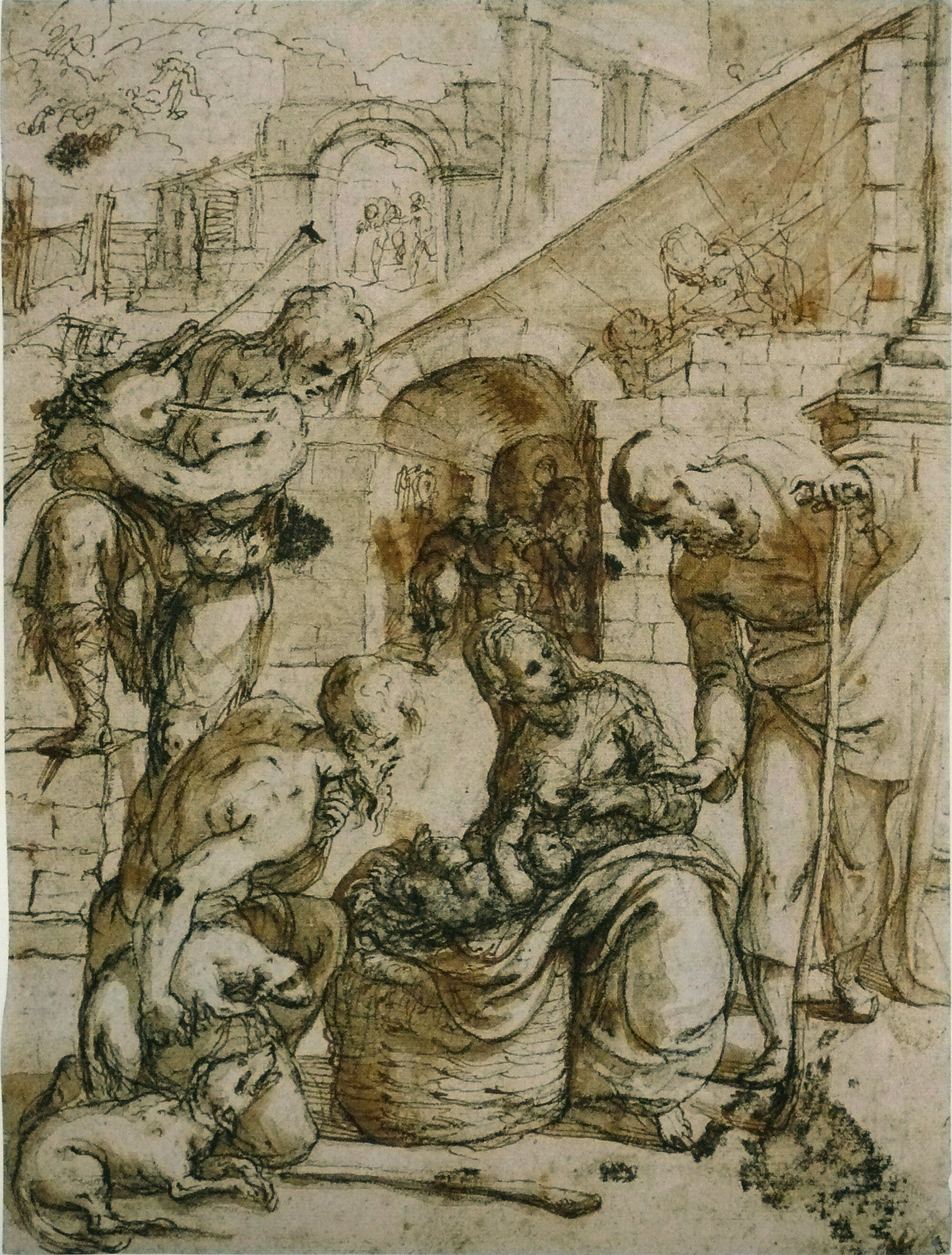
Adoration of the Shepherds, Carlo Urbino, 16th century
