= Georges de La Tour =

French painter (1593–1652)

- Born: 13 March 1593; Vic-sur-Seille, Duchy of Lorraine
- Died: 30 January 1652 (aged 58); Lunéville, Duchy of Lorraine
- Notable work: The Fortune Teller; Joseph the Carpenter; Magdalene at a Mirror; The Card Sharp with the Ace of Diamonds
- Movement: Baroque
- Patrons: Henry II, Duke of Lorraine

Signature
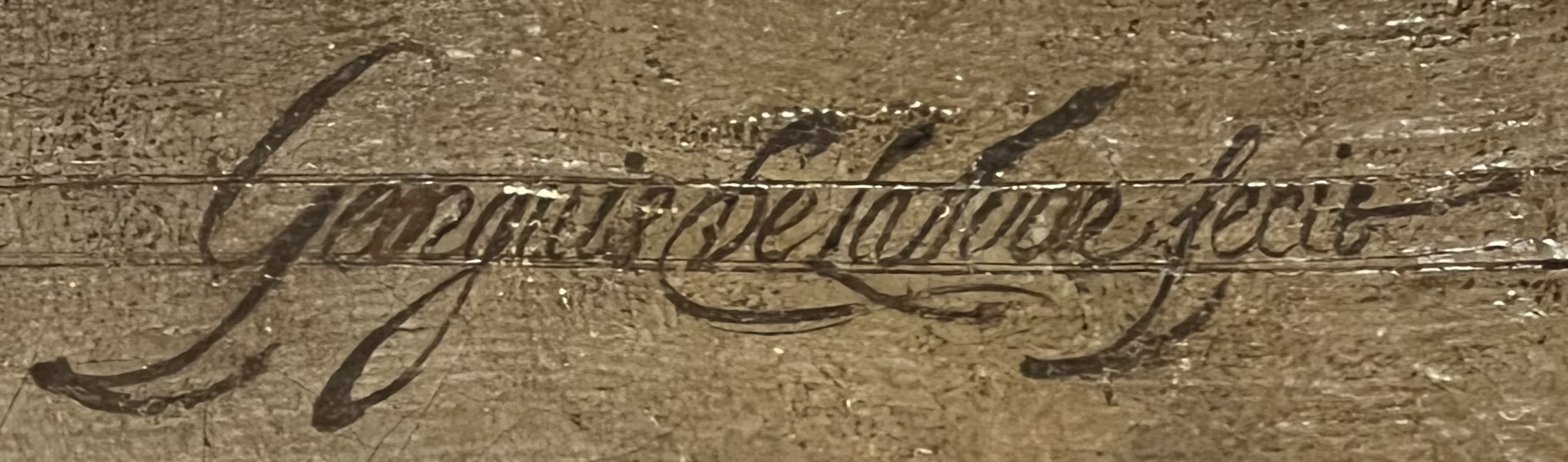

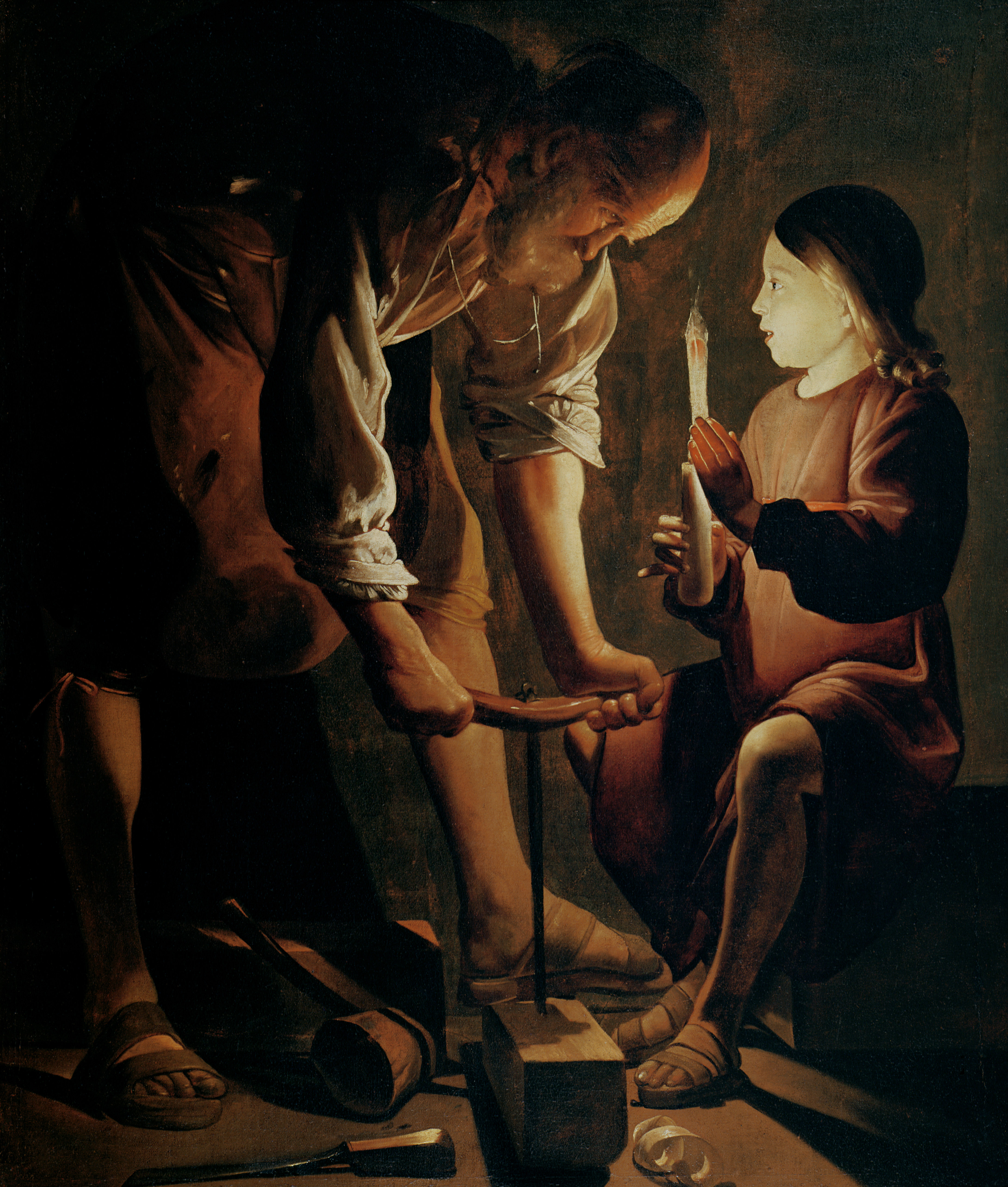
Joseph the Carpenter, 1642, Louvre

Georges de La Tour (French pronunciation: [ʒɔʁʒ də la tuʁ]; 13 March 1593 – 30 January 1652) was a French Baroque painter, who spent most of his working life in the Duchy of Lorraine, which was temporarily absorbed into France between 1641 and 1648. He painted mostly religious chiaroscuro scenes lit by candlelight.

An artist at the confluence of Nordic, Italian, and French cultures, and a contemporary of Jacques Callot and the Le Nain brothers. Likely inspired by Caravaggio, much of his work emphasizes light and shadow on simplified forms.

Recognised during his lifetime, he was quickly forgotten after his death. Rediscovered in the early 20th century by German art historian Hermann Voss, he later inspired writers as diverse as René Char, André Malraux, Pascal Quignard, and Charles Juliet.

== Personal life ==
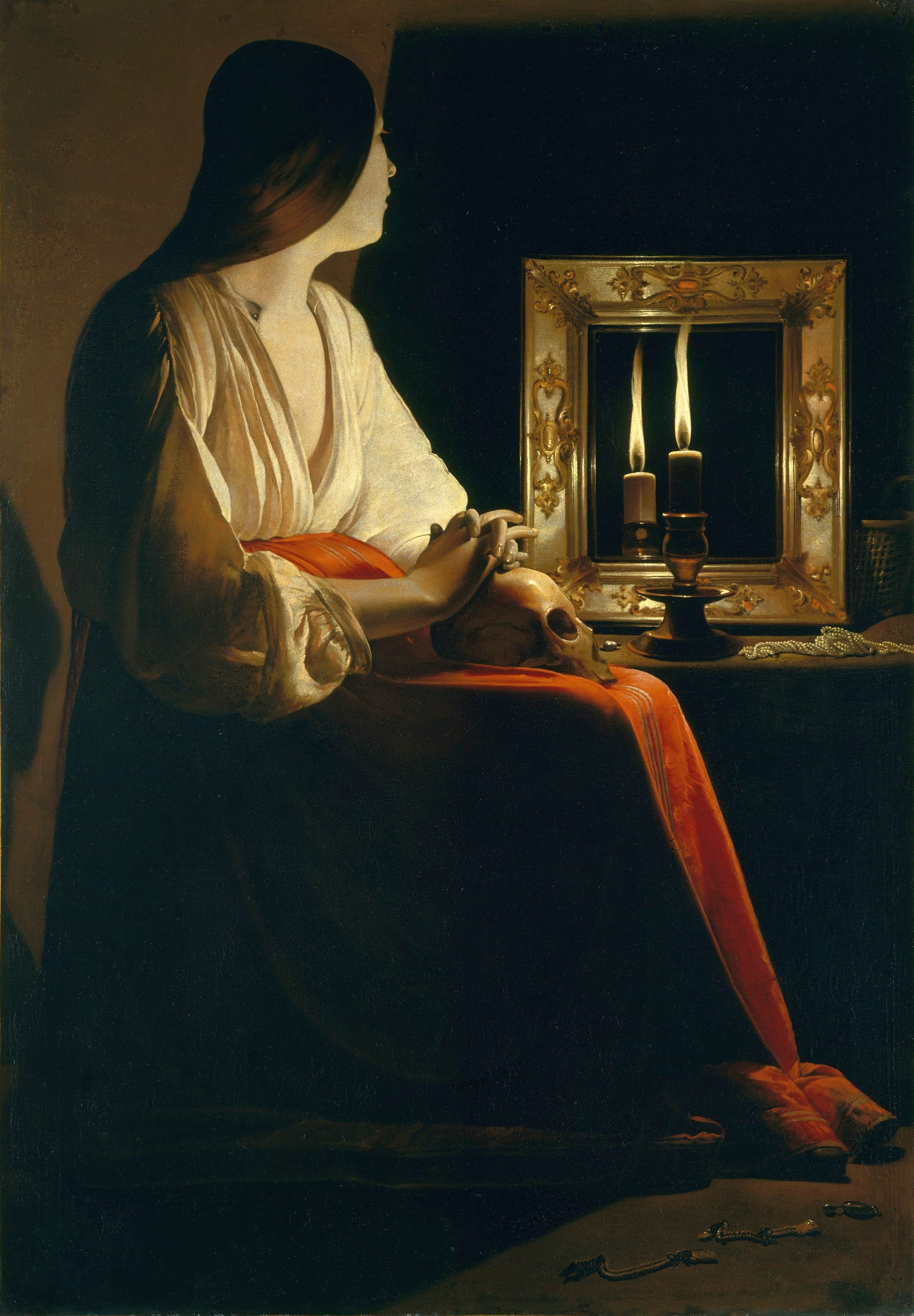
Magdalene with Two Flames, c. 1640, Metropolitan Museum of Art

Georges de La Tour was born in the town of Vic-sur-Seille in the Diocese of Metz, which was technically part of the Holy Roman Empire, but had been ruled by France since 1552. Baptism documentation revealed that he was the son of Jean de La Tour, a baker, and Sybille de La Tour, née Molian. It has been suggested that Sybille came from a partly noble family. His parents had seven children in all, with Georges being the second-born.

La Tour's educational background remains somewhat unclear, but it is assumed that he traveled either to Italy or the Netherlands early in his career. He may possibly have trained under Jacques Bellange in Nancy, the capital of Lorraine, although their styles are very different. His paintings reflect the Baroque naturalism of Caravaggio, but this probably reached him through the Dutch Caravaggisti of the Utrecht School and other Northern (French and Dutch) contemporaries. In particular, La Tour is often compared to the Dutch painter Hendrick Terbrugghen.

In 1617 he married Diane Le Nerf, from a minor noble family, and in 1620 he established his studio in her quiet provincial home-town of Lunéville, part of the independent Duchy of Lorraine which was occupied by France, during his lifetime, in the period 1641–1648. He painted mainly religious and some genre scenes. He was given the title "Painter to the King" (of France) in 1638, and he also worked for the Dukes of Lorraine in 1623–4, but the local bourgeoisie provided his main market, and he achieved a certain affluence. He is not recorded in Lunéville between 1639 and 1642, and may have traveled again; Anthony Blunt detected the influence of Gerrit van Honthorst in his paintings after this point. He was involved in a Franciscan-led religious revival in Lorraine, and over the course of his career he moved to painting almost entirely religious subjects, but in treatments with influence from genre painting.

Georges de La Tour and his family died in 1652 in an epidemic in Lunéville. His son Étienne (1621–1692) was his pupil.

== Works ==
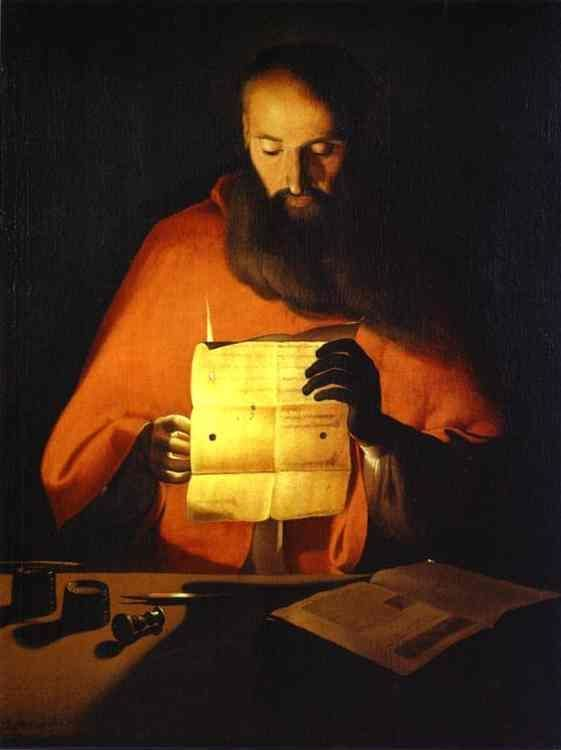
Saint Jerome Reading

La Tour's early work shows influences from Caravaggio, probably via his Dutch followers, and the genre scenes of cheats—as in The Fortune Teller—and fighting beggars clearly derive from the Dutch Caravaggisti, and probably also his fellow-Lorrainer, Jacques Bellange. These are believed to date from relatively early in his career.

La Tour is best known for the nocturnal light effects which he developed much further than his artistic predecessors had done, and transferred their use in the genre subjects in the paintings of the Dutch Caravaggisti to religious painting in his. Unlike Caravaggio his religious paintings lack dramatic effects. He painted these in a second phase of his style, perhaps beginning in the 1640s, using chiaroscuro, careful geometrical compositions, and very simplified painting of forms. His work moves during his career towards greater simplicity and stillness—taking from Caravaggio very different qualities than Jusepe de Ribera and his Tenebrist followers did.

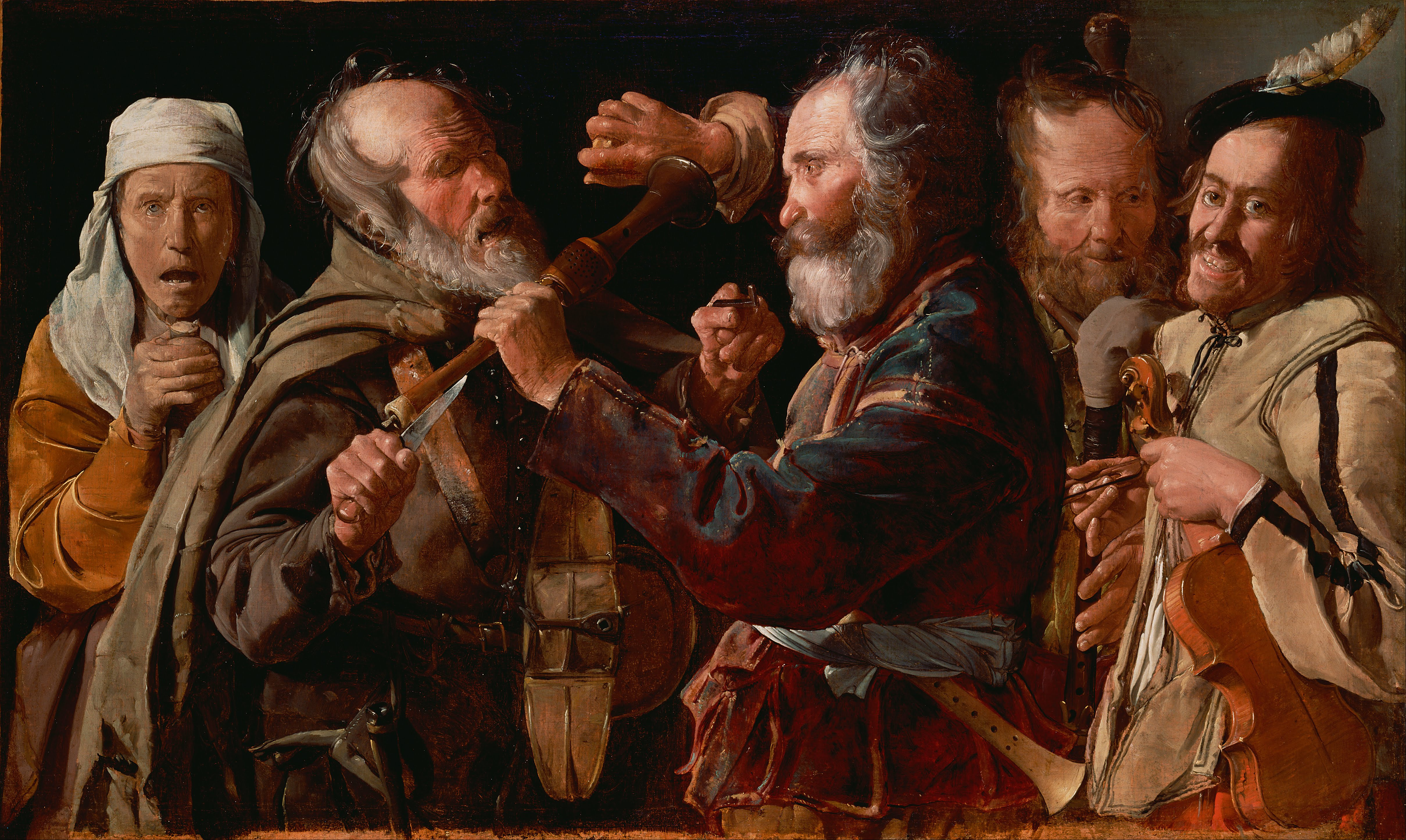
The Musicians' Brawl, (Hurdy-gurdy group), c. 1625–1630, Getty Museum

He often painted several variations on the same subjects, and his surviving output is relatively small. His son Étienne was his pupil, and distinguishing between their work in versions of La Tour's compositions is difficult. The version of the Education of the Virgin in the Frick Collection in New York is an example, as the Museum itself admits. Another group of paintings (example left), of great skill but claimed to be different in style to those of La Tour, have been attributed to an unknown "Hurdy-gurdy Master". All show older male figures (one group in Malibu includes a female), mostly solitary, either beggars or saints.

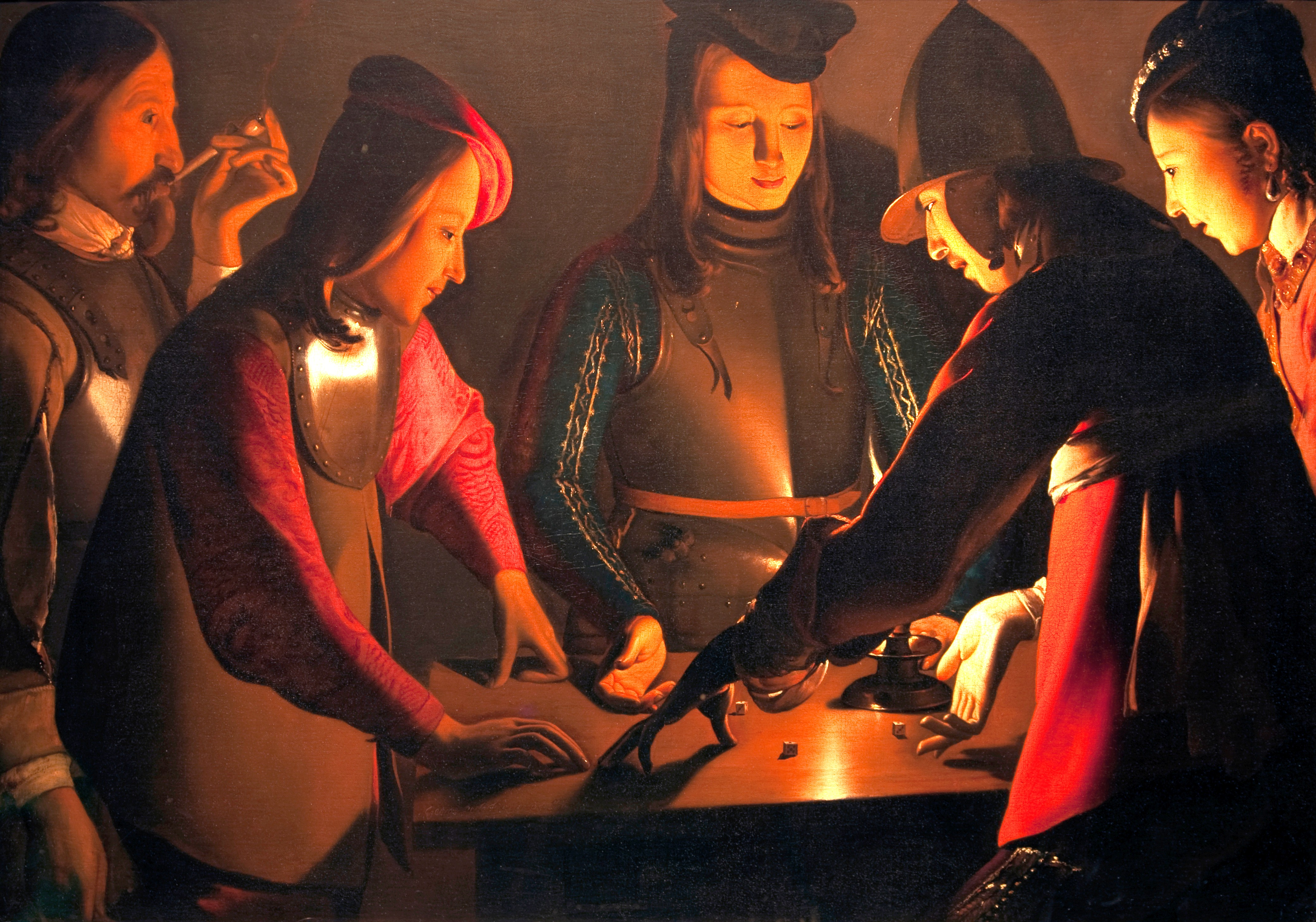
Dice-players, c. 1651, probably his last work, Preston Hall Museum, Stockton-on-Tees, UK

After his death at Lunéville in 1652, La Tour's work was forgotten until rediscovered in 1915 by Hermann Voss, a German art historian who would later become head of Hitler's Führermuseum; some of La Tour's work had in fact been confused with that of Vermeer, when the Dutch artist underwent his own rediscovery in the nineteenth century.

== Gallery ==
Chiaroscuro scenes

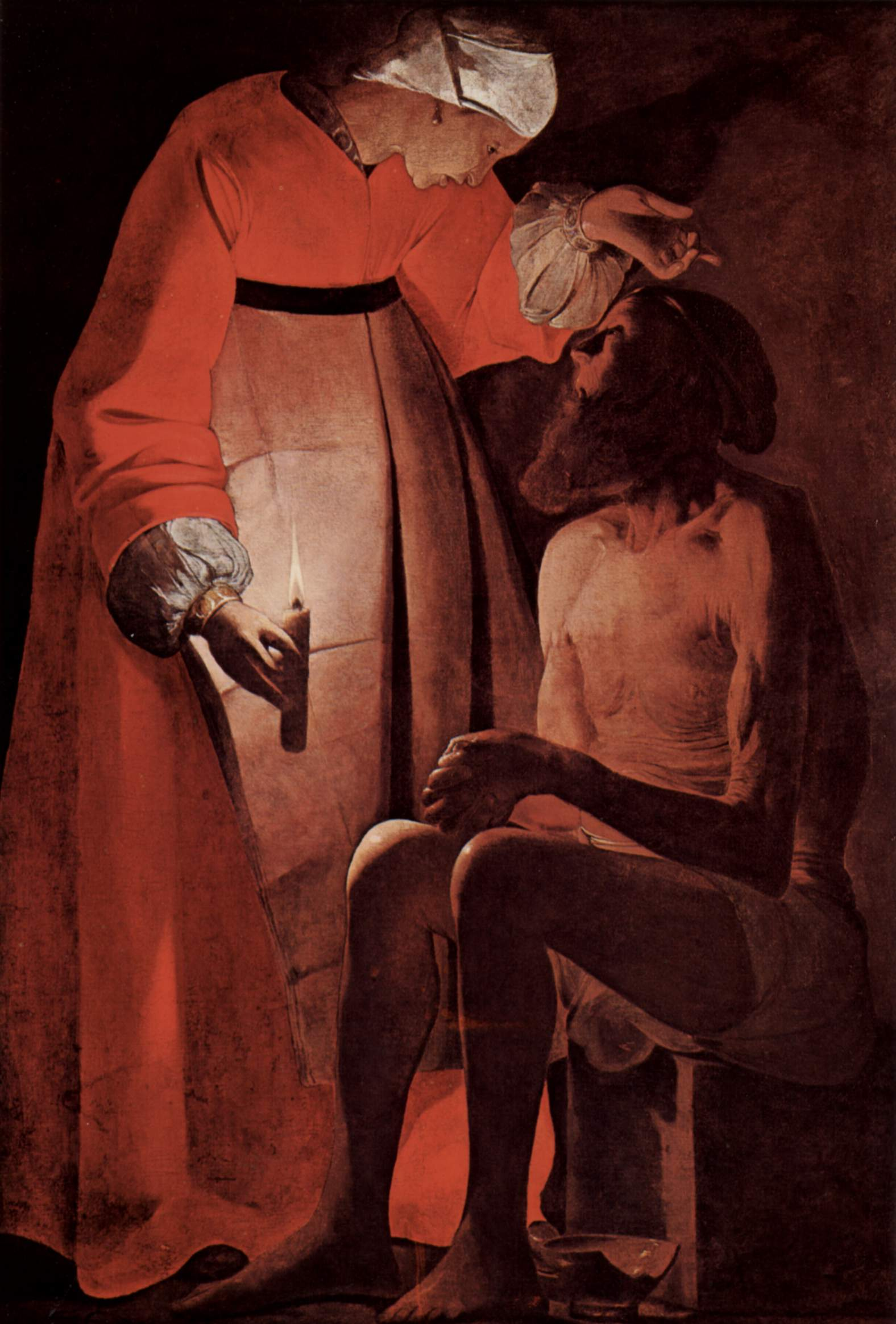
Job Mocked by his Wife, c. 1625–1650, Musée départemental d'Art ancien et contemporain, Épinal, France

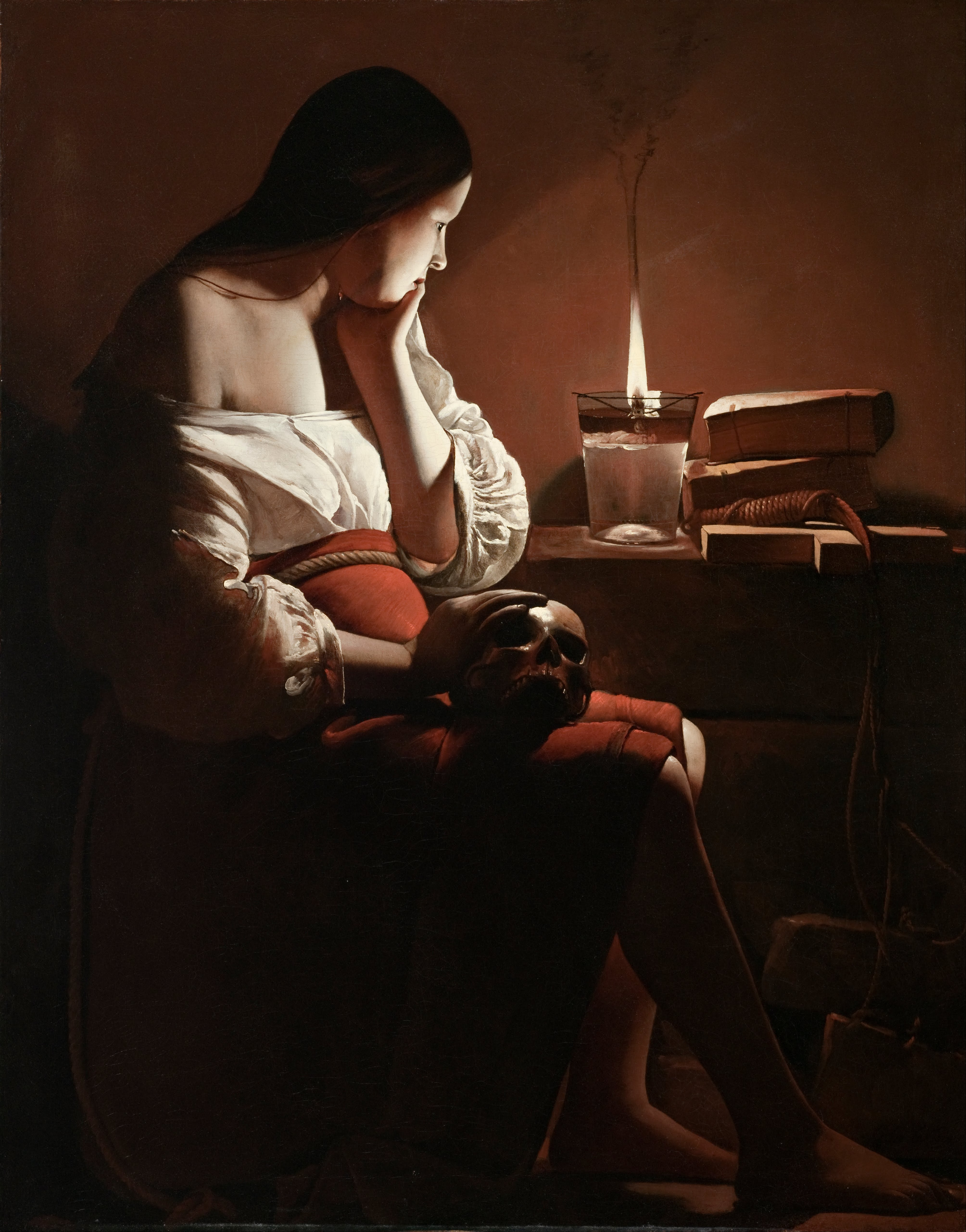
Magdalene with the Smoking Flame, c. 1640, Los Angeles County Museum of Art

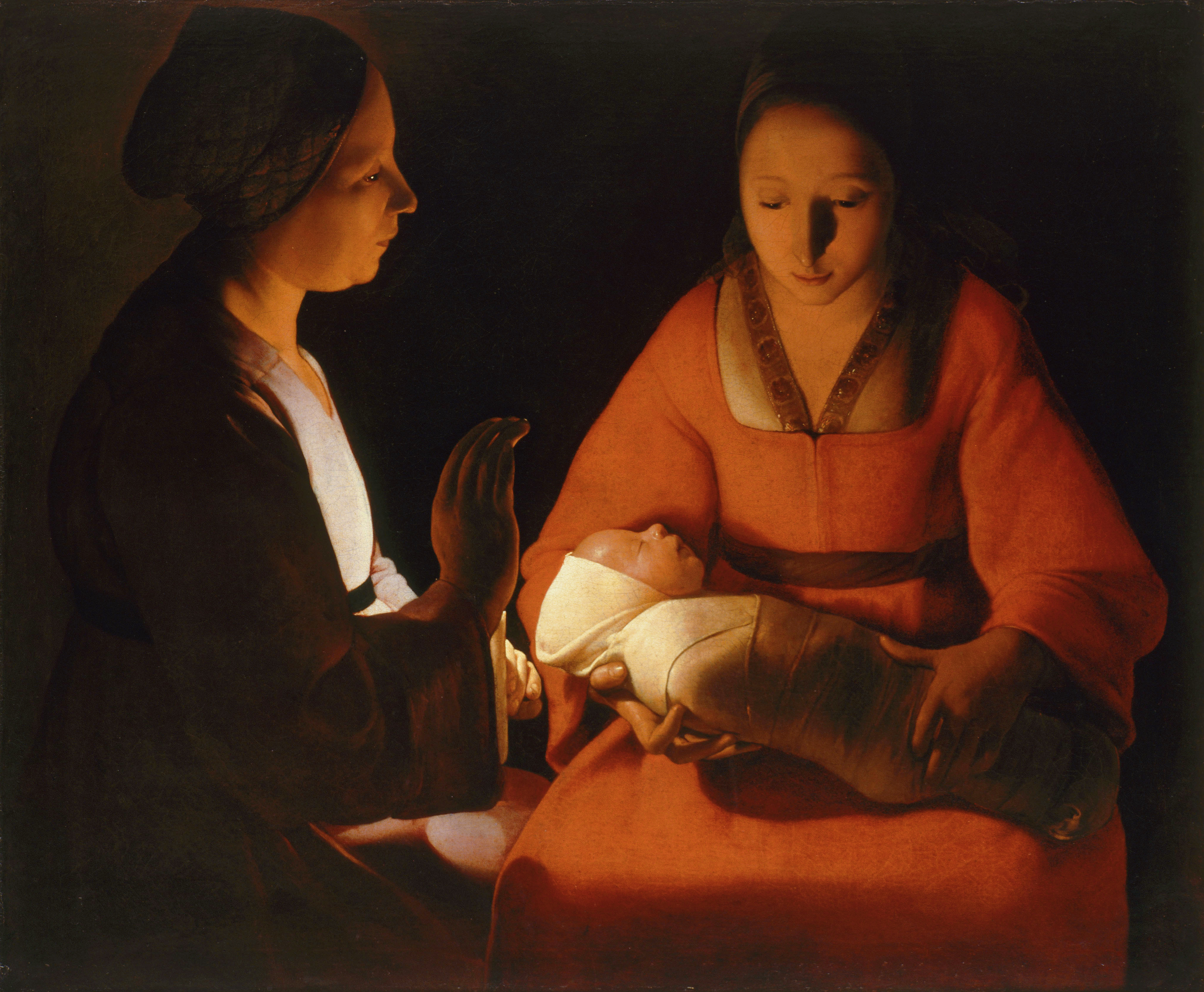
The Newborn Christ, c. 1645–1648, Museum of Fine Arts of Rennes

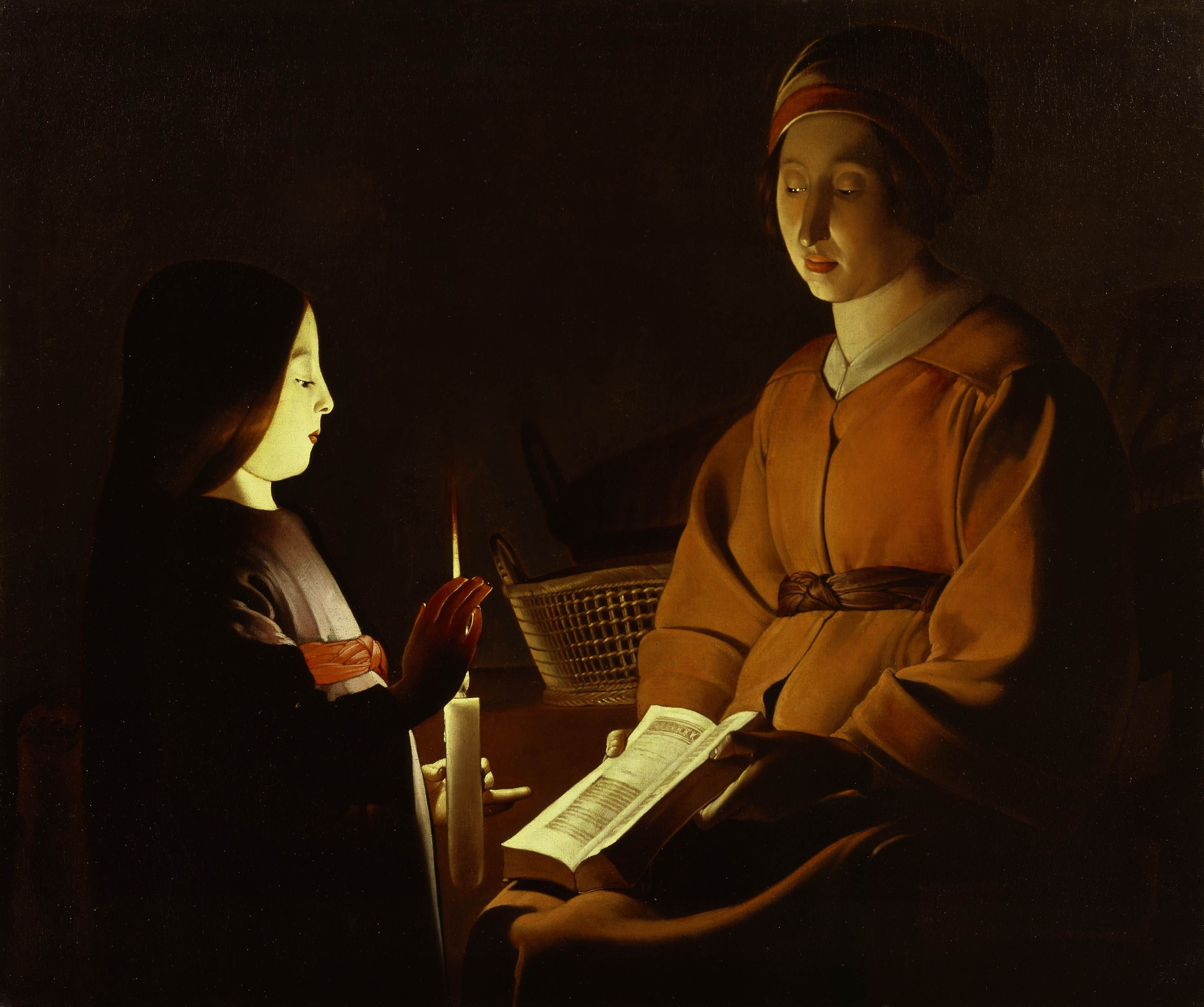
The education of the Virgin, c. 1650, The Frick Collection

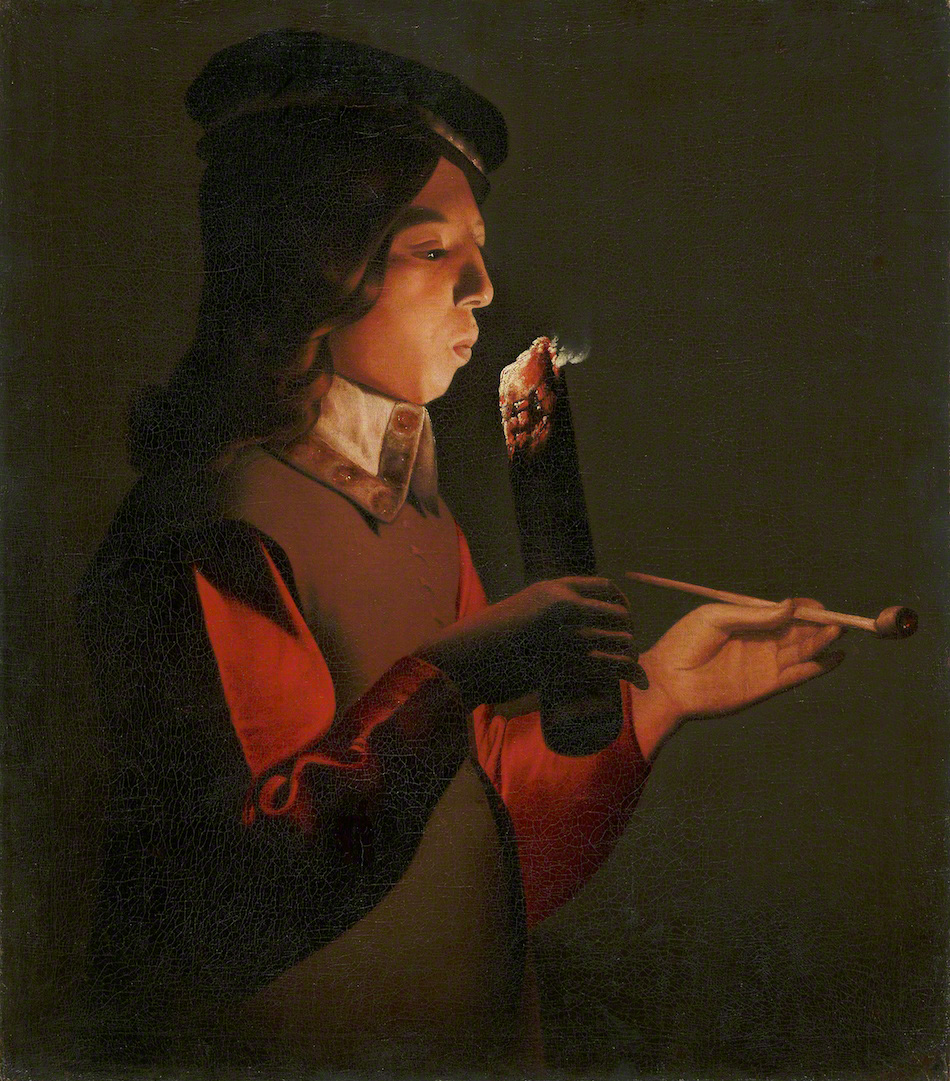
The smoker, 1646, Tokyo Fuji Art Museum

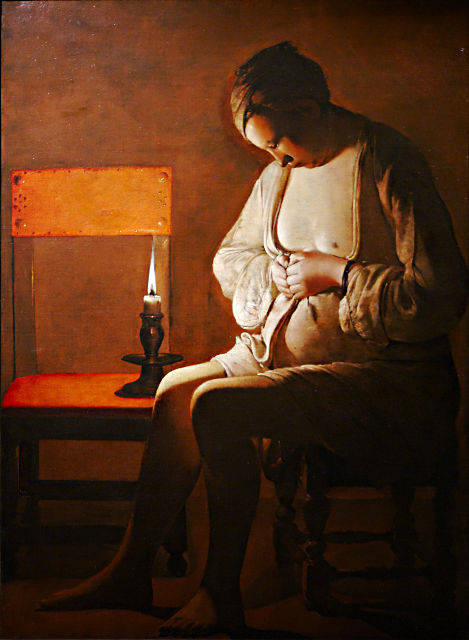
The Flea-Catcher, 1638, Musée Lorrain, Nancy

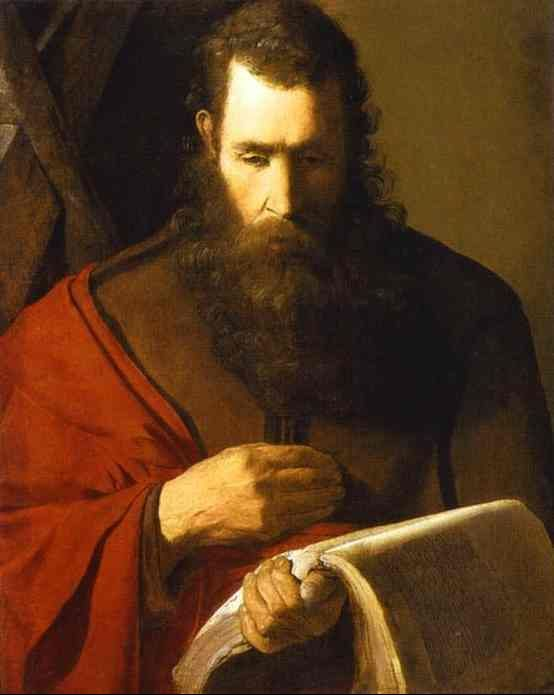
Saint Andrew in the Albi Apostles series, c. 1620

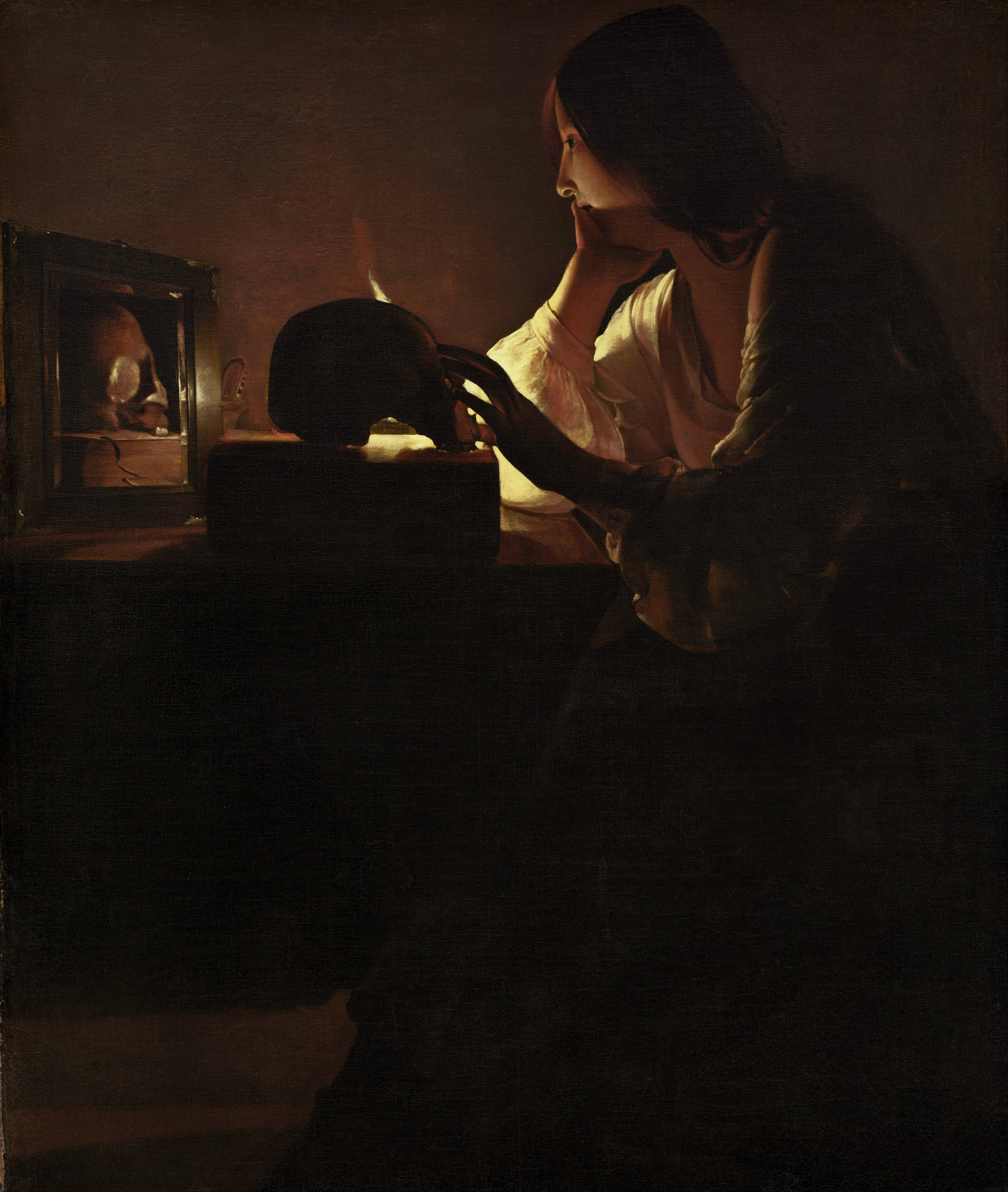
The Repentant Magdalene, c. 1635–1640, National Gallery of Art
Other

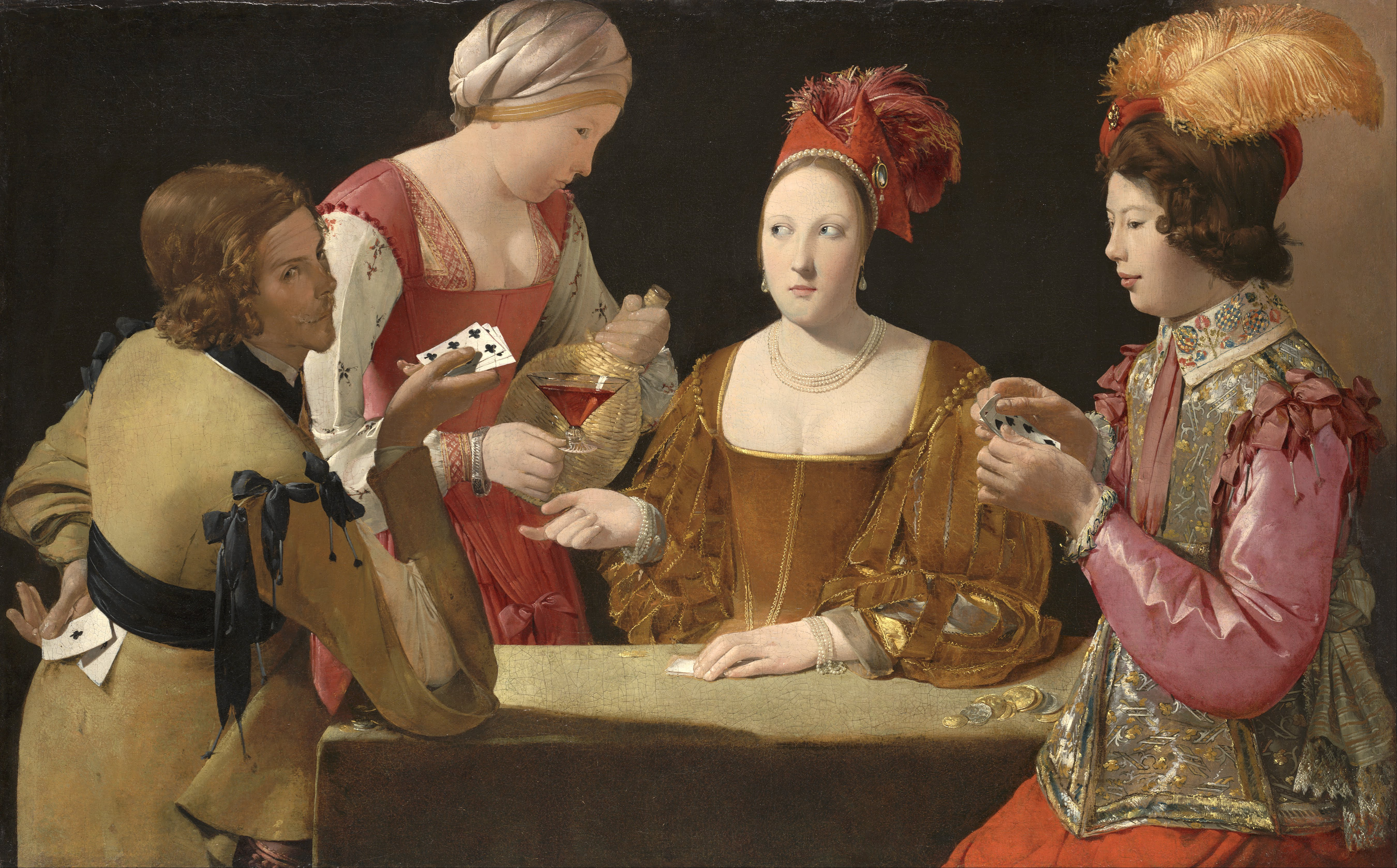
The Cheat with the Ace of Clubs, c. late 1620s, Kimbell Art Museum, Fort Worth, Texas. Another version (with Diamonds and slightly different clothes) is in the Louvre.

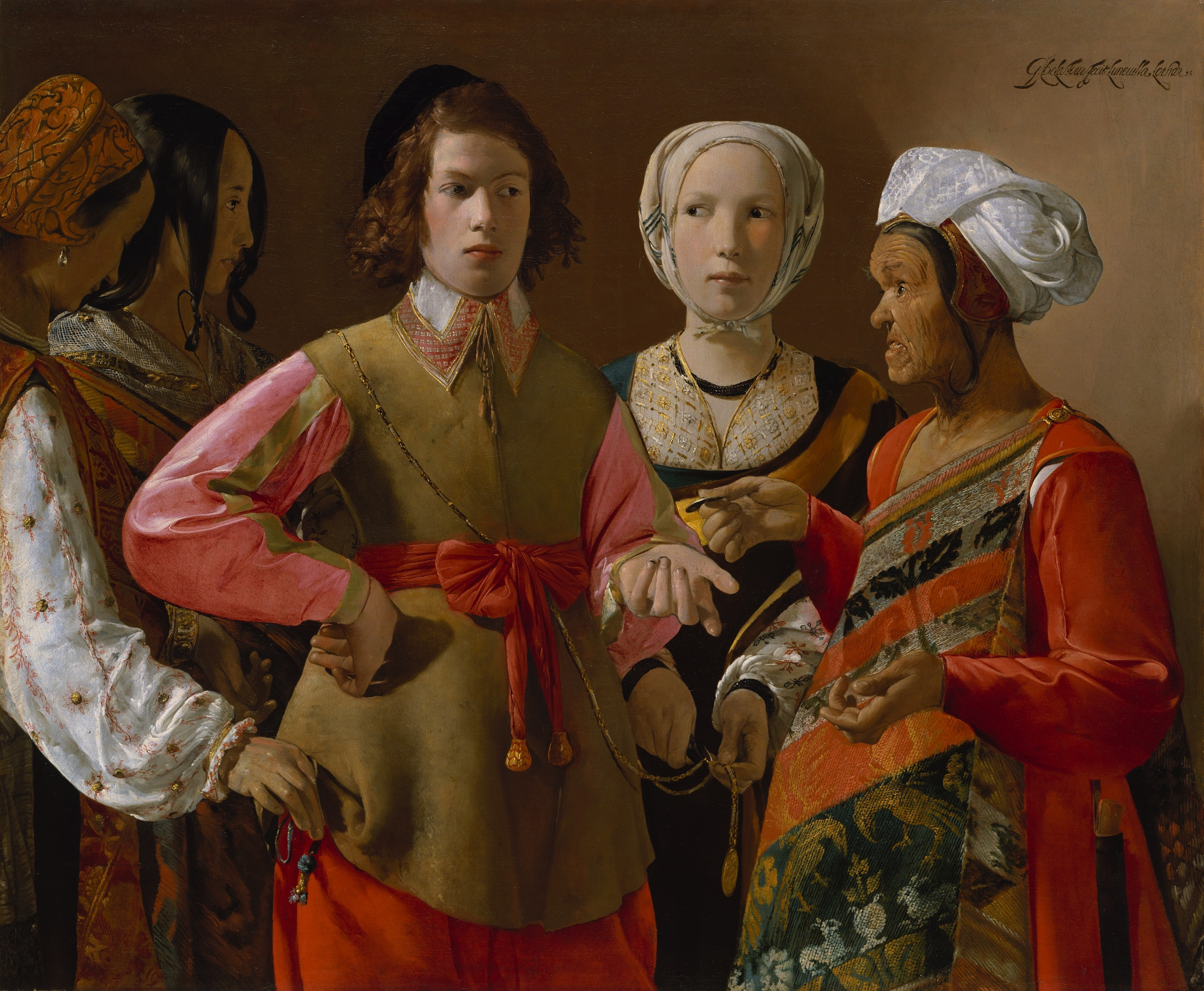
The Fortune Teller, 1633–1639, Metropolitan Museum of Art

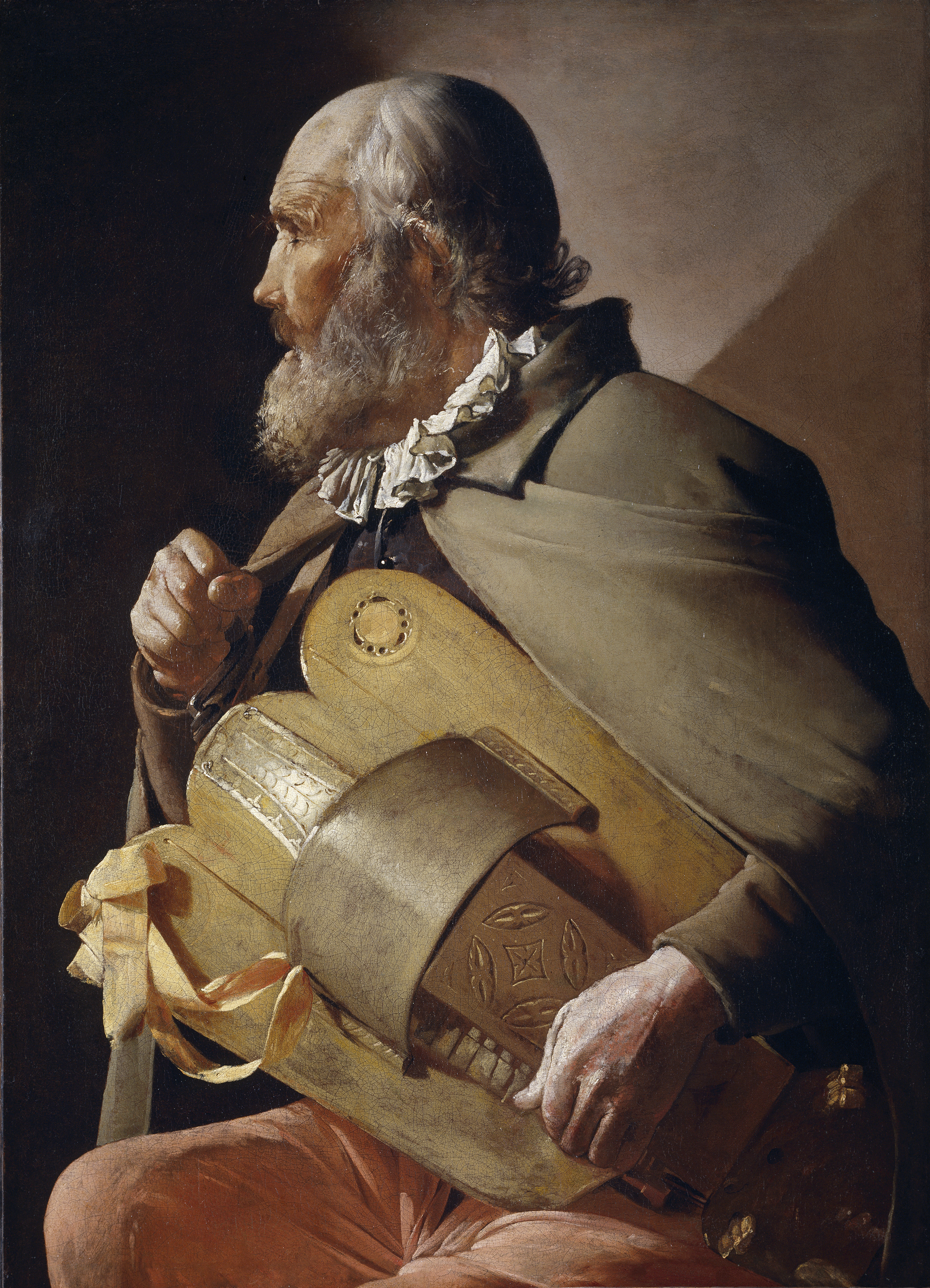
The Hurdy-Gurdy Player, c. 1610–1630, Prado Museum

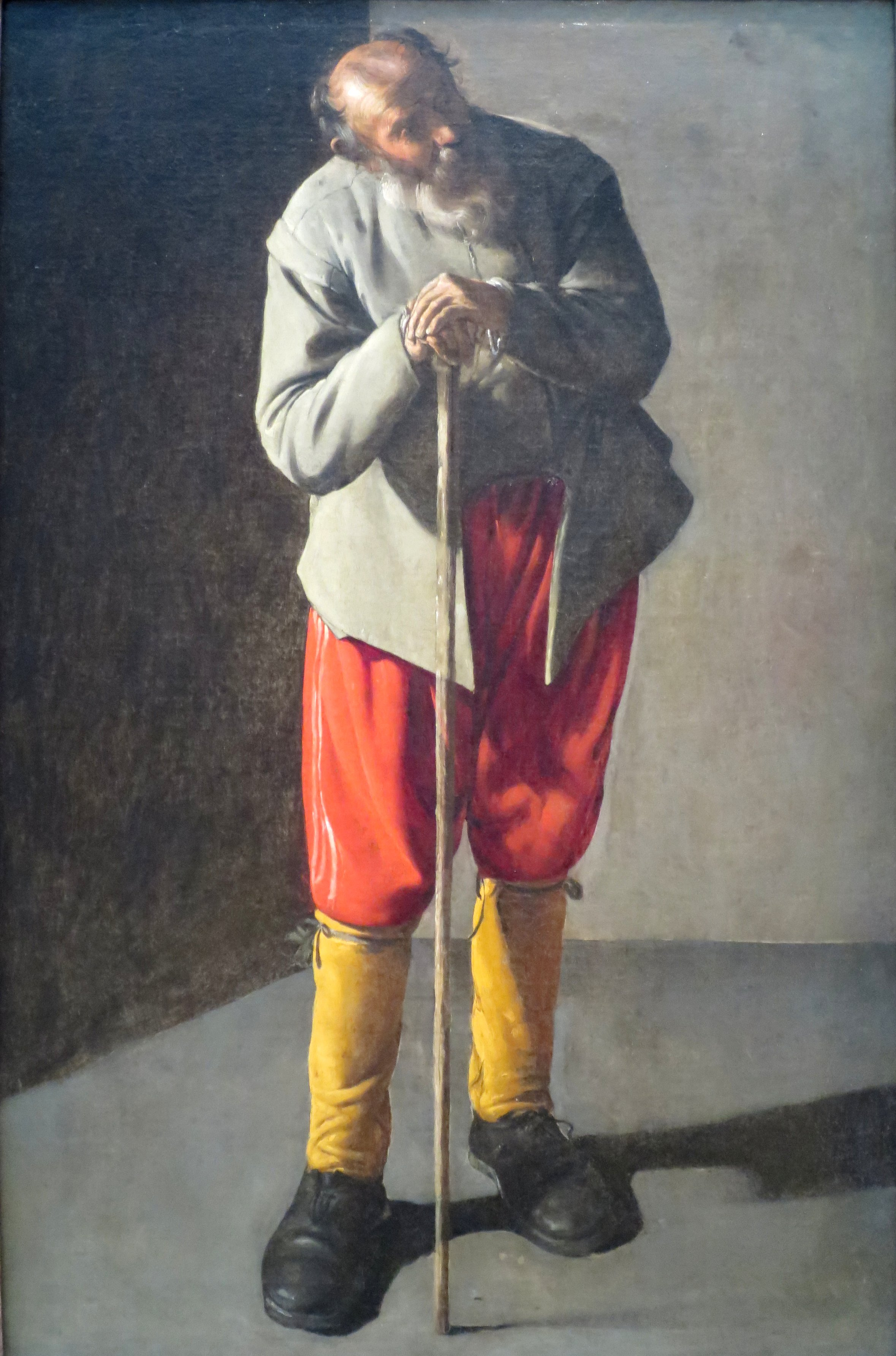
Portrait of an Old Man, c. 1624–1650, De Young Museum, San Francisco

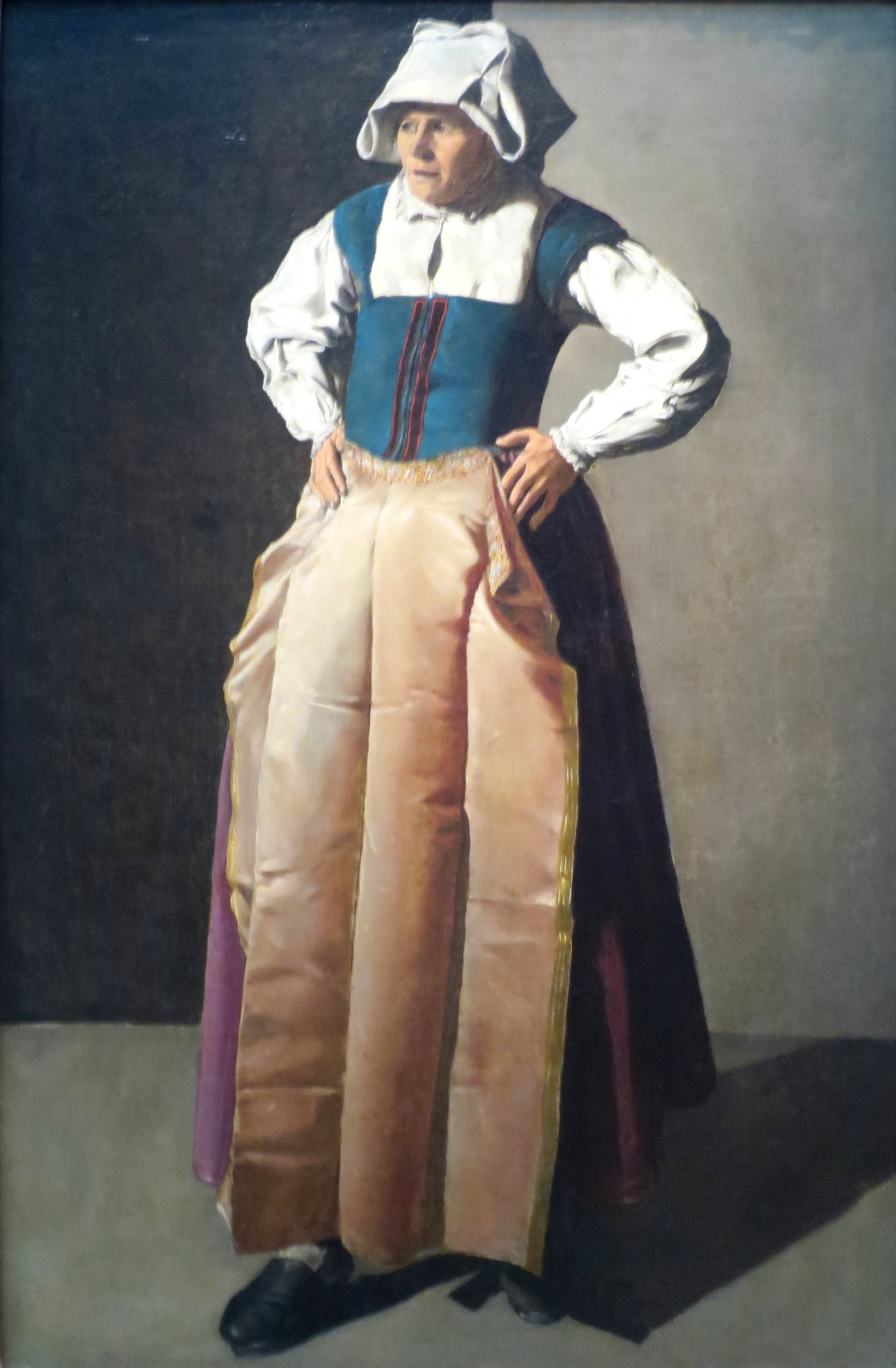
Portrait of an Old Woman, c. 1624–1650, De Young Museum, San Francisco

== See also ==
- Tenebrism
- Joseph Wright of Derby
