= Penitent Magdalene =

Penitent Magdalene or Penitent Magdalen refers to a period of repentance in the life of Mary Magdalene, according to medieval legend, and a large number of artworks showing this subject, including:

- Penitent Magdalene (Donatello), 1453–1455 wooden statue by Donatello
- Penitent Magdalene (Caravaggio), c. 1597 painting by Caravaggio
- Penitent Magdalene (El Greco), c.1594–1595 painting by El Greco
- Penitent Magdalene (Artemisia Gentileschi), c. 1625 painting by Artemisia Gentileschi
- Penitent Magdalene (Ribera), 1618–1623 painting by Jusepe de Ribera
- Penitent Magdalene (Titian, 1533), c. 1533 painting by Titian
- Penitent Magdalene (Titian, 1550), c. 1550 painting by Titian
- Penitent Magdalene (Titian, 1565), c. 1565 painting by Titian
- The Repentant Magdalene (Cagnacci), c. 1660–1663 painting by Cagnacci
- Magdalene with the Smoking Flame, Louvre and LACMA, Magdalene at the Mirror New York Met and the Magdalene with Two Flames now in Washington DC, all by Georges De La Tour, c. 1640s
