= Magdalene with the Smoking Flame =

Painting by Georges de La Tour

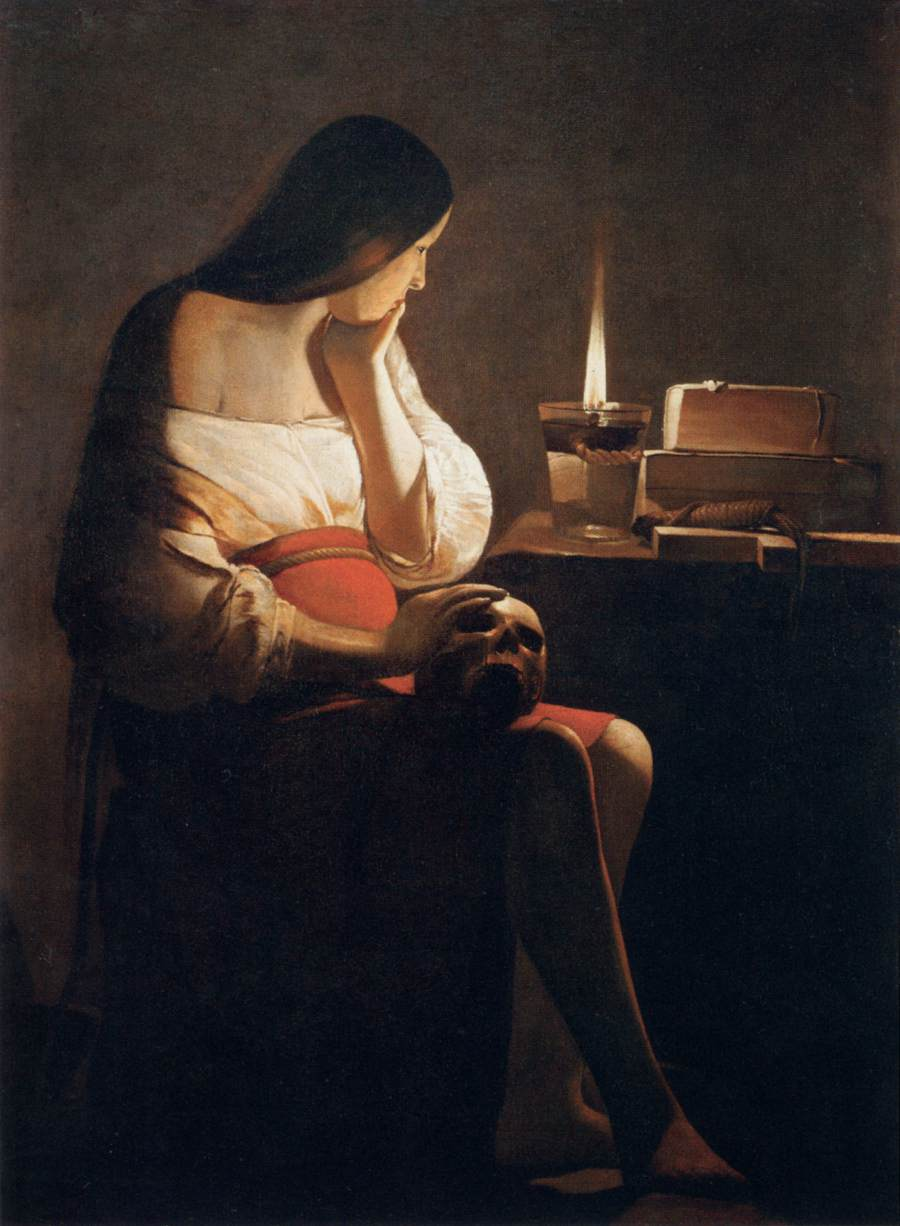
- Artist: Georges de La Tour
- Year: c. 1640
- Medium: Oil on canvas
- Dimensions: 128 cm × 94 cm (50 in × 37 in)
- Location: Louvre, with another version in Los Angeles County Museum of Art

Magdalene with the Smoking Flame (also titled in French La Madeleine à la veilleuse, and La Madeleine à la flamme filante) is a c. 1640 oil-on-canvas depiction of Mary Magdalene by French Baroque painter Georges de La Tour. Two versions of this painting exist, one in the Los Angeles County Museum of Art and the other in the Louvre Museum in Paris (La Madeleine a la veilleuse). There are differences between these two, but they are very minor, for example the books on the table, and the shape of the flame.

There are at least two other paintings by de La Tour with variant compositions of the Penitent Magdalene seen by candlelight, the Magdalene at the Mirror now in New York City and the Magdalene with Two Flames now in Washington DC.

== History ==
The Louvre version of the painting was bought in 1949 from the French Administration des Douanes. In the somewhat uncertain chronology of Georges de La Tour's work, this painting has been allotted the date of 1640, by analogy with the Saint Mary with a Mirror, which has been dated between 1635 and 1645. The location of this painting before 1949 is unknown.

The LACMA version of the painting was with the La Haye family in France, and then with Simone La Haye from approximately 1943 to 1977. In 1977, it was purchased by the Ahmanson Foundation and donated in that same year to LACMA.

=== Georges de La Tour ===
Georges de La Tour was a Catholic Baroque artist with a successful career, despite the fact that he was working at an unsettling time of religious wars and the violence that followed. He learned many skills from the work of Caravaggio such as tenebrism, an especially dramatic contrast between light and shadow. Like Caravaggio, de La Tour was interested in low-life, hoaxers, thieves and swindlers. Unlike Caravaggio, he was not violent or a murderer. His artwork is known to be thoughtful, genuine and sincere. He painted many versions, suggesting that several of his patrons were interested in this theme. The series contains small changes in lighting, pose, and symbolism. Although these changes are small, the paintings seem to portray a number of different meanings and emotions.

By the 1620s, La Tour was offered substantial court patronage in Lorraine and royal patronage in Paris. In the 1630s, during the Thirty Years War, La Tour spent time in Paris painting for Cardinal Richelieu. He also painted for King Louis XIII and presented him with a Night Scene with Saint Sebastian. He was then titled painter-in-ordinary to the king.

== Mary Magdalene in Baroque art ==
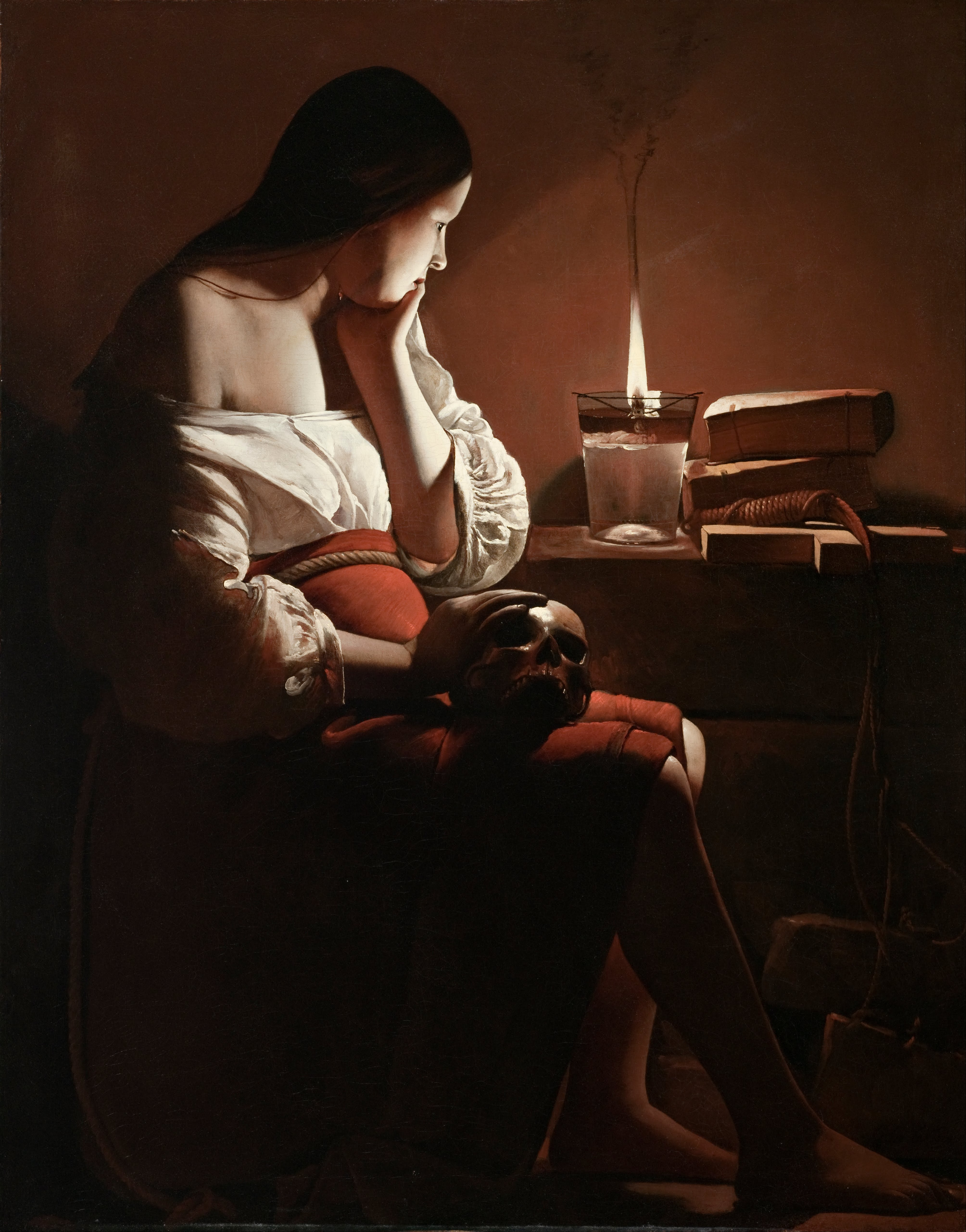
LACMA version

During the 17th century, great devotion was shown to Mary Magdalene in all Catholic countries. She was the perfect lover of Christ, her beauty was made more appealing because of her repentance, which had a special attraction for a period so passionately interested in problems of mysticism, quietism and asceticism. The theme of the repentance of sinners and trials sent by God is illustrated in subjects such as the Repentance of St. Peter, Mary Magdalene, and Job. A number of written works give evidence to the cult of Magdalene and this cult became widespread since Provence contained two great sanctuaries dedicated to her: the grotto of La Sainte-Baume, and the Saintes-Maries-de-la-Mer.

After being introduced to Jesus Christ, Mary Magdalene became one of Christ's most devoted followers. Mary Magdalene became a symbol of the sacrament of penance and contemplation. In Baroque art, Mary Magdalene is usually shown beneath Christ's feet because according to interpretations of the Bible, she was a prostitute who washed Jesus's feet using her hair and tears. She is also known to have witnessed Jesus's crucifixion, burial, and resurrection. In paintings, she is usually recognized as a saint with a halo above her head and she often holds an ointment jar.

In the Baroque era, the image of Mary Magdalene went through a change. If the medieval Magdalene was shown as a former sinner who was saved through salvation, Mary Magdalene during the Counter-Reformation was depicted as beguilingly seductive. Like other saints, Mary Magdalene was often used as propaganda for the Catholic sacraments. For example, Francesco Vanni's painting, The Last Communion of Mary Magdalene, shows the practice of communion with a dying woman, which made a statement about the triumph of the Catholic faith against disagreements with Protestantism.

== Visual analysis ==
=== Subject matter ===
The Magdalene with the Smoking Flame portrays Mary Magdalene with a skull on her lap and a brightly lit candle on the desk. She has her hand under her chin while staring at the candle. There are two books placed on the desk, like the books in the other versions of the paintings. One of the books is the Holy Bible. There is also a cross and a rope scourge on top of the desk. The rope looks similar to the rope that is tied around her waist. Her shoulders are bare and her skirt only reaches to her knees leaving her legs bare.

Georges de La Tour paints Magdalene with her hand tucked under her chin, contemplating death with the slight touch of the skull with her other hand. In the Magdalene with the Smoking Flame there is no mirror in the painting compared to Magdalene at the Mirror and Magdalene with Two Flames. The Magdalene in this painting is not monochrome like the other versions.

=== Influences ===
Most of Georges de La Tour's paintings were influenced by Caravaggio and his followers from Rome. Caravaggio's followers spread throughout other European countries; therefore, it was not necessary for Georges de La Tour to travel to Italy. De La Tour was not only inspired by Caravaggio's style, but also by other northern styles. He concentrated on dramatic effects of light and shade called tenebrism. Georges de La Tour took Caravaggio's style of tenebrism and made it into something new and entirely his own. He created several monumental paintings that are different from both Italian art and Caravaggism. He brought many characteristics of mystery, tranquil grandeur, and silence into his artwork which brings it closer to French classical art and literature.

== Variant compositions ==
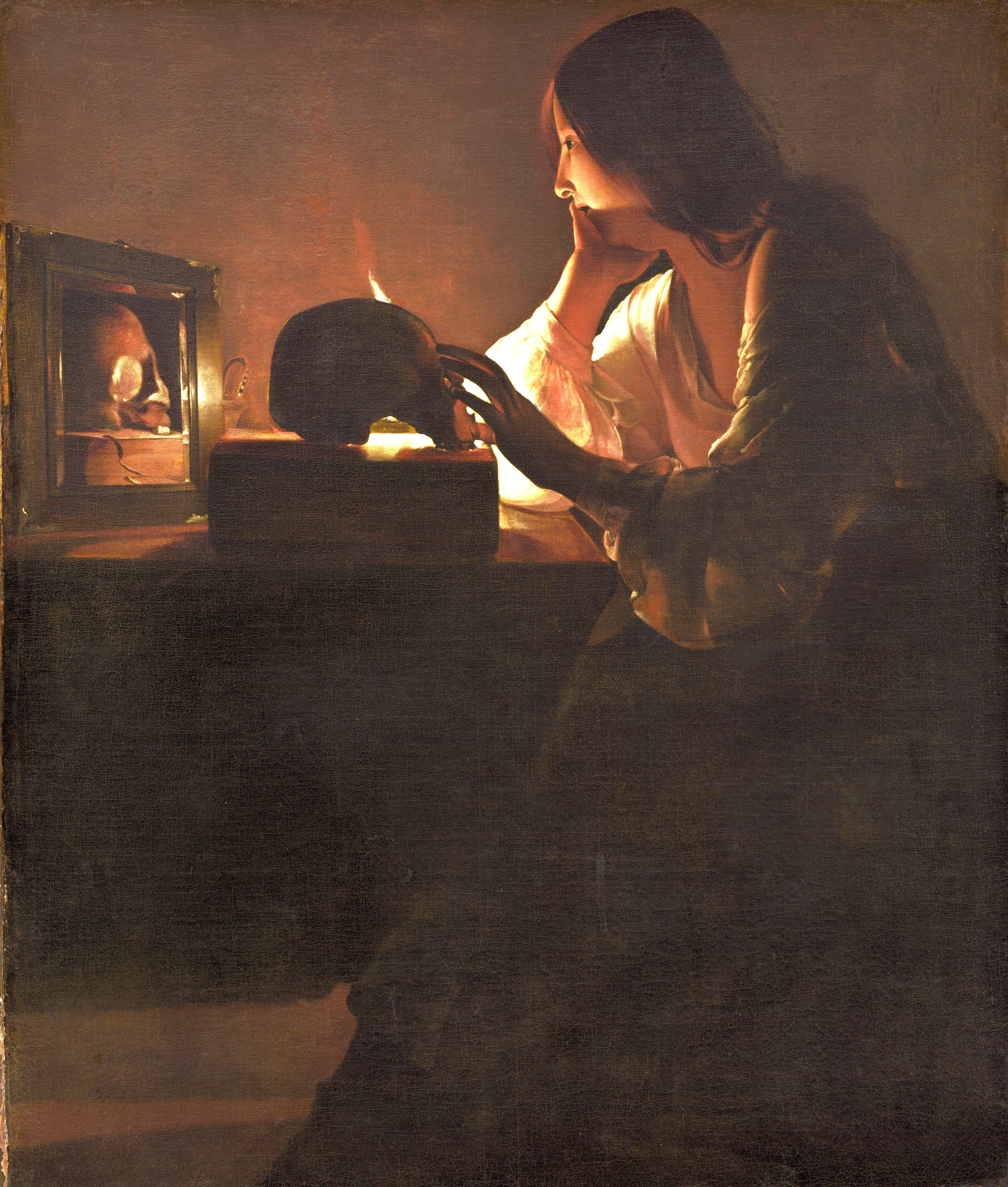
Georges de La Tour, Magdalene at a Mirror or Repentant Magdalene, 1635–1640, oil on canvas, National Gallery of Art

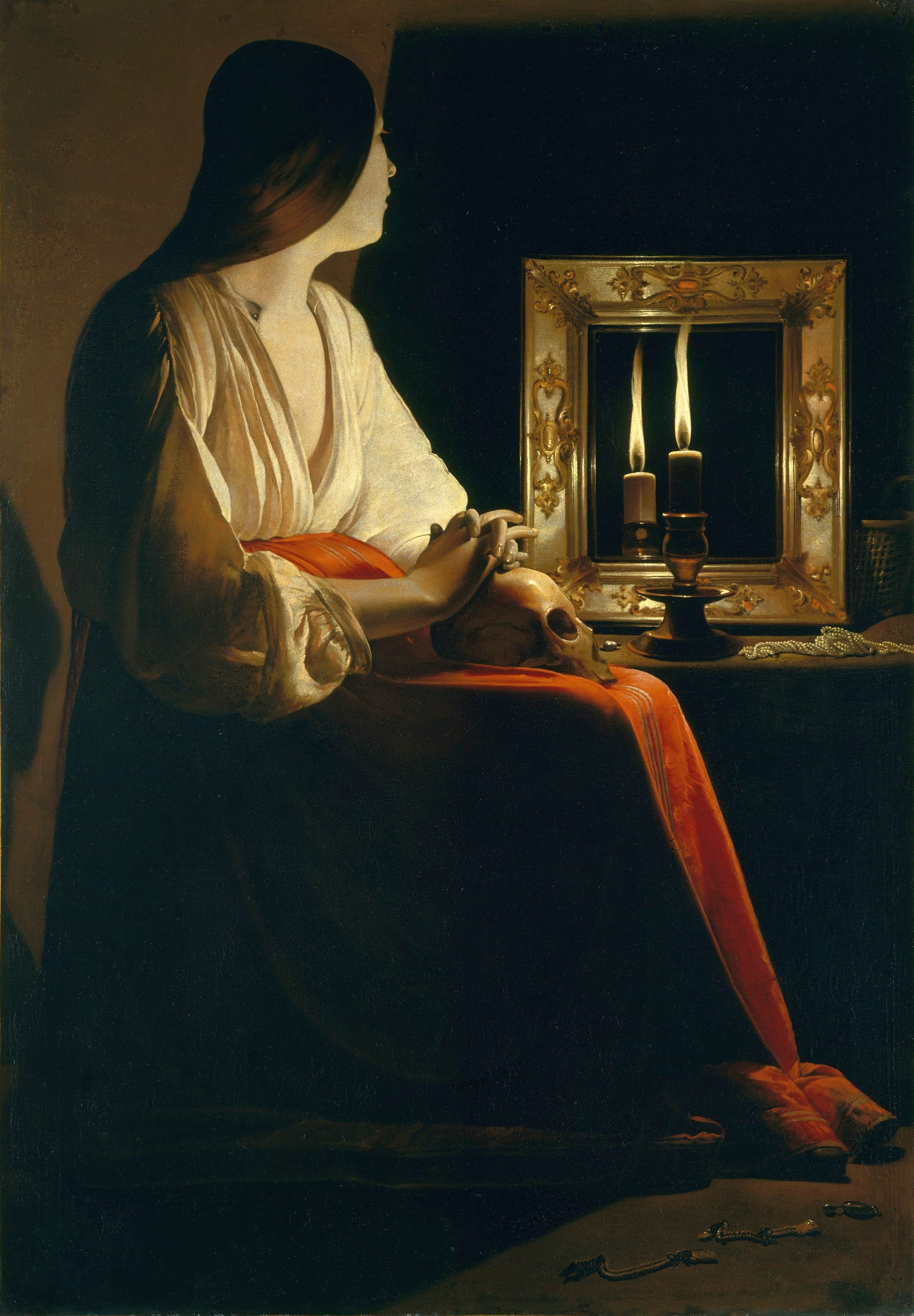
Georges de La Tour, Magdalene with Two Flames, 1625–1650 (exact date unknown), oil on canvas, Metropolitan Museum of Art NY

There are at least two other paintings by de La Tour with variant compositions of the Penitent Magdalene seen by candlelight.

Magdalene at the Mirror (National Gallery of Art) is an oil on-canvas painting created circa 1635–1640. This version is known to be the original painting out of the Magdalene series. In Magdalene at the Mirror, Magdalene is shown in profile view sitting in front of the mirror, candle, and skull. The skull is on top of the Bible on the desk and the candle is covered by the skull. The viewer can only observe the top of the slightly shown candle and the light illuminating around it. The mirror shows the side of the skulls face yet the skull has its back towards the mirror. The mirror symbolizes vanity while the skull is a metaphor of mortality. The candlelight most likely stands for spiritual enlightenment. Martha with Magdalene at the Mirror was also painted by Caravaggio during the 16th century.

Magdalene with Two Flames (Metropolitan Museum of Art, New York) is an oil-on-canvas painting created between 1625 and 1650. The exact date is unknown. The skull is placed on Magdalene's lap with her hands clasped over the head. The candle is brightly lit and is reflected within the mirror. The light from the candle illuminates throughout the room and on the wall where we see Magdalene's shadow.

== In popular culture ==
The painting appears in the film The Little Mermaid as one of Ariel's many human artefacts in her secret grotto. Ariel touches the flame in the painting as she sings about wondering what a fire is and why it burns. This painting also appears in the book Museum ABC as one of the paintings in the L page.
