= Penitent Magdalene (Donatello) =

Sculpture by Donatello

Magdalene Penitent
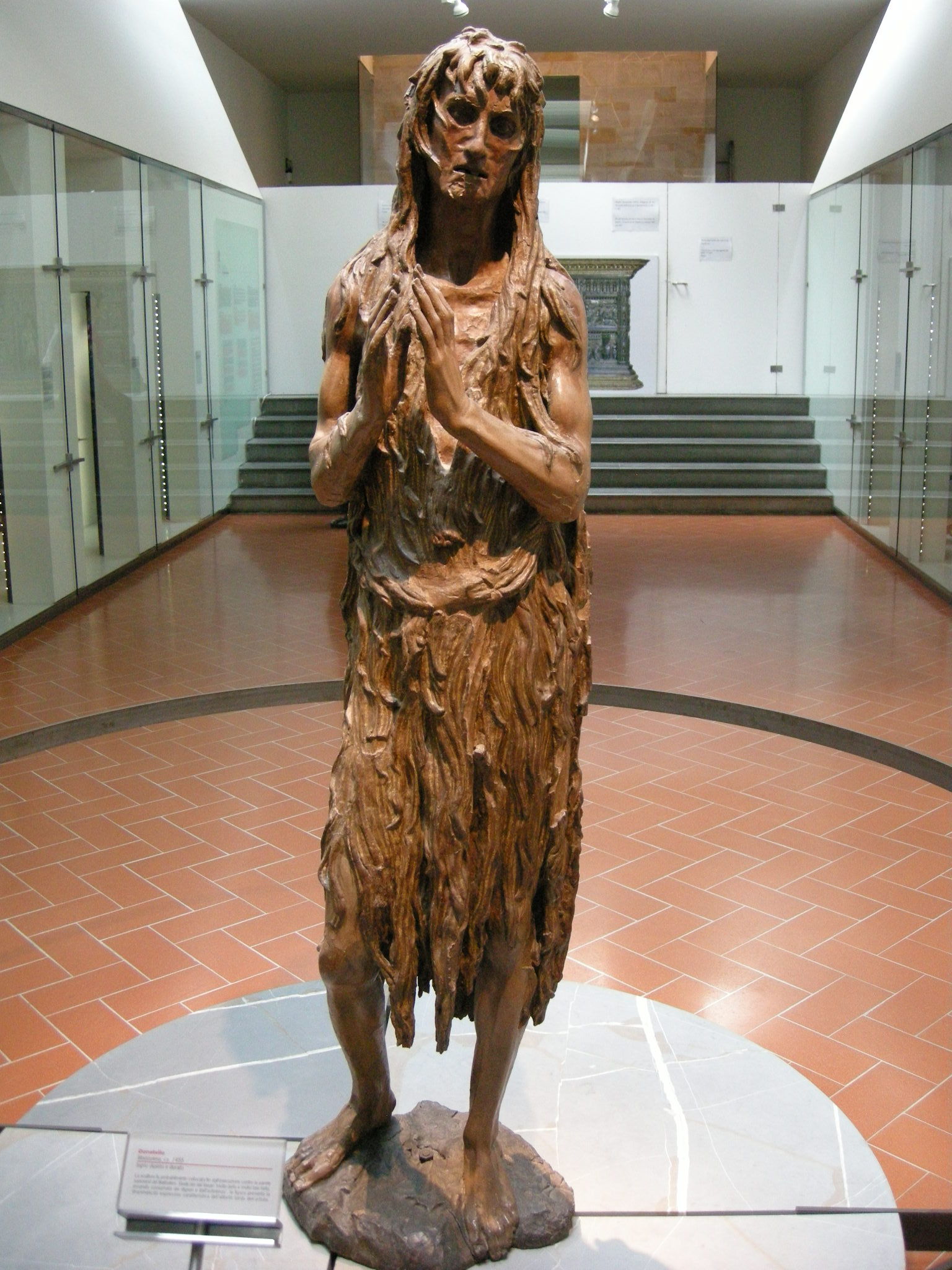
- Artist: Donatello
- Year: c. 1440
- Type: Wood
- Dimensions: 188 cm
- Location: Museo dell'Opera del Duomo, Florence

The Penitent Magdalene is a wooden sculpture of Mary Magdalene by the Italian Renaissance sculptor Donatello, now usually dated to around 1440. The sculpture was probably commissioned for the Baptistery of Florence. The piece was received with astonishment for its unprecedented realism. It is now in the Museo dell'Opera del Duomo in Florence. The wood used by Donatello is that of white poplar.

Wood was still used for crucifixes for its lightness. It was also inexpensive and convenient for transporting long distances, and was usually painted. When a Florentine confraternity in Venice commissioned from Donatello a statue of John the Baptist, patron saint of Florence, still in the Frari Church there, wood was chosen. It was signed and dated 1438 (before this was revealed in conservation work it had been dated later), and remains the only work by Donatello in the city; he usually did not sign his work, except for some commissions destined for outside Florence.

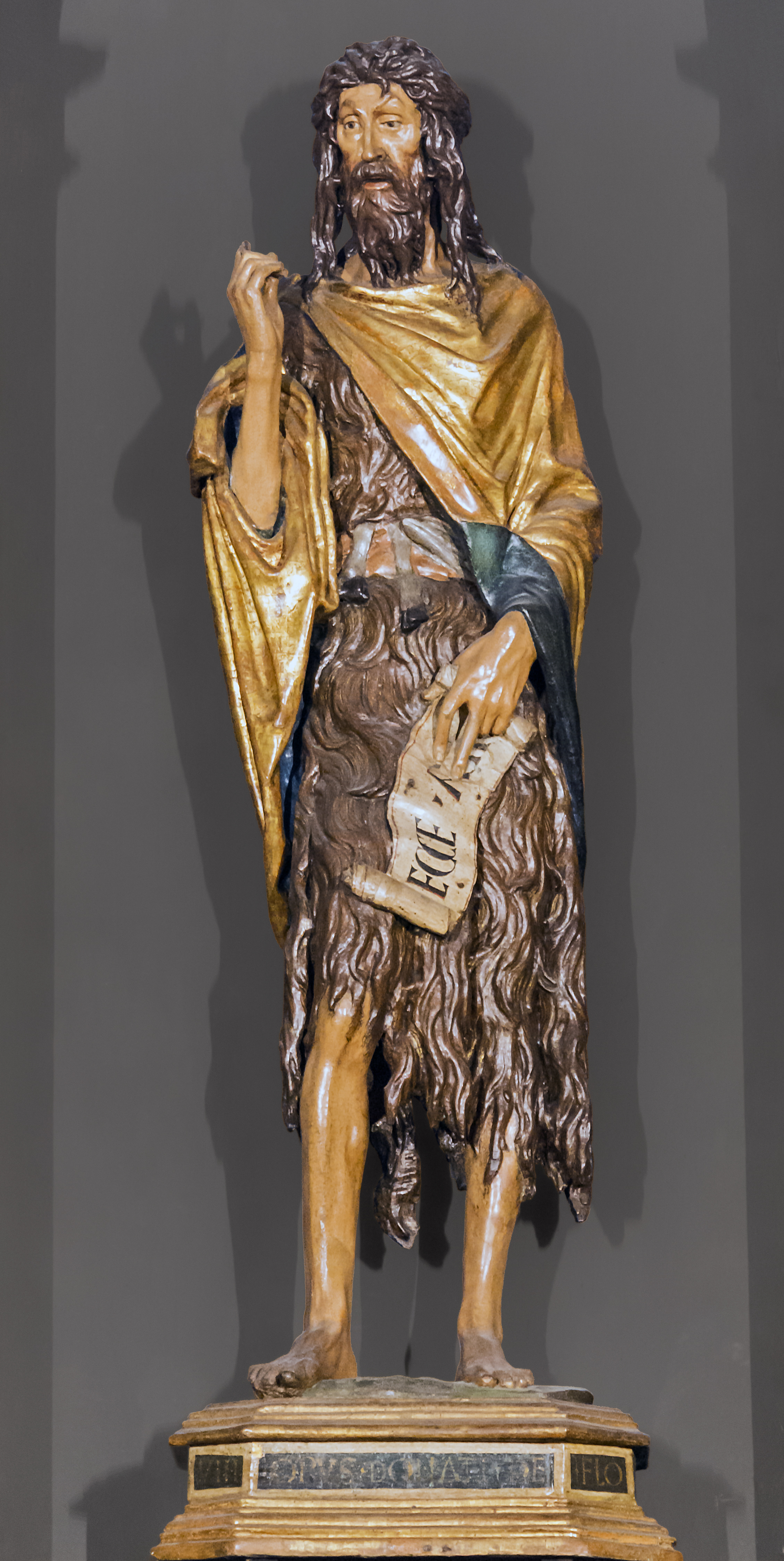
Donatello's statue of John the Baptist, still in the Frari Church in Venice, dated 1438

The revised dating of the Saint John had knock-on consequences for a far more celebrated wooden figure, the Penitent Magdalene long in the Florence Baptistery. This is "formidably expressive" in a stark style found in Donatello's last years, and had been dated to around 1456, or 1453–1455, until the date was found on the other figure; it is now dated generally to the late 1430s, or at any rate before Donatello went to Padua.

== Iconography ==
Though the "Penitent Magdalene" was the usual depiction for the many single figures of Mary Magdalene in art, Donatello's gaunt, emaciated figure differs greatly from most depictions, which show a beautiful young woman in nearly perfect health. The Magdalene Penitent is famous for the detailed and very realistic carvings on the statue. Medieval hagiography in the Western church had conflated the figure of Mary Magdalene, already conflated with Mary of Bethany and the unnamed sinner in the Anointing of Jesus, with that of Saint Mary of Egypt. She was a popular figure in the Eastern Churches, who had been a prostitute before spending thirty years repenting in the desert. Donatello's depiction is similar to, and very probably influenced by, Eastern Orthodox icons of Mary of Egypt, which show a similar emaciated figure. He thus ignored the Western legends by which Mary was daily fed by angels in the desert.

== History ==
Documentation about the work is scarce. The earliest mentioning of the Penitent Magdalene dates from 1500 and mentions that the statue is being placed back in the Baptistery in Florence against the southwest wall. Since then, the statue has been moved a few times: in 1688 it was replaced by the baptismal font and put in storage, in 1735 it was moved back to the Baptistery against the southeast wall and in 1912 it was put back against the southwest wall. Today, being moved after restoration, it can be seen in the Sala della Maddalena in the Museo dell'Opera del Duomo in Florence.

The Renaissance art historian Giorgio Vasari mentions the work in his Vite:

"In the same baptistery, opposite this tomb, a statue from Donatello's own hand can be seen, a wooden Saint Mary Magdalene in Penitence which is very beautiful and well executed, for she has wasted away by fasting and abstinence to such an extent that every part of her body reflects a perfect and complete understanding of human anatomy."

Donatello was thought to have executed the work when he was more than sixty years old, after he had spent a decade in Padua. The dating was supported by a 1455 copy from Neri di Bicci's workshop, now in the Museum of the Collegiate of Empoli.

In 1500 the work was in the city's baptistery. According to an Italian historian, it was seen by Charles VIII of France in the 1480s, when he was camped with his army near Florence.

The work was damaged by the 1966 flood of the Arno, and the restoration process revealed some of the statue's original polychrome paint and gilding.
