= Mermaid Lagoon (Tokyo DisneySea) =

Themed land

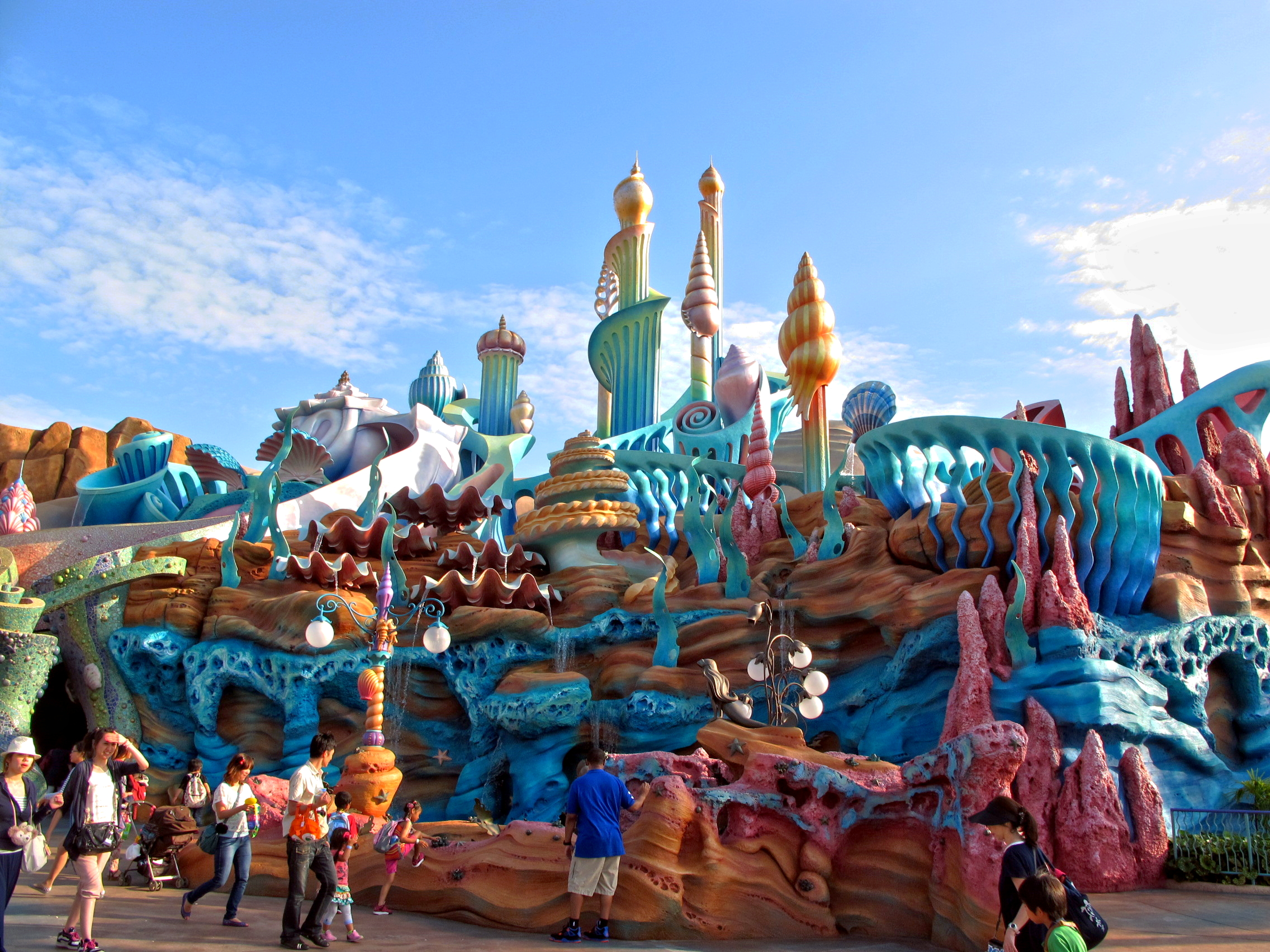
- Theme: The Little Mermaid

Attractions
- Total: 8
- Roller coasters: 1
- Other rides: 7

Tokyo DisneySea
- Coordinates: 35°37′36″N 139°53′17″E
- Opened: September 4, 2001

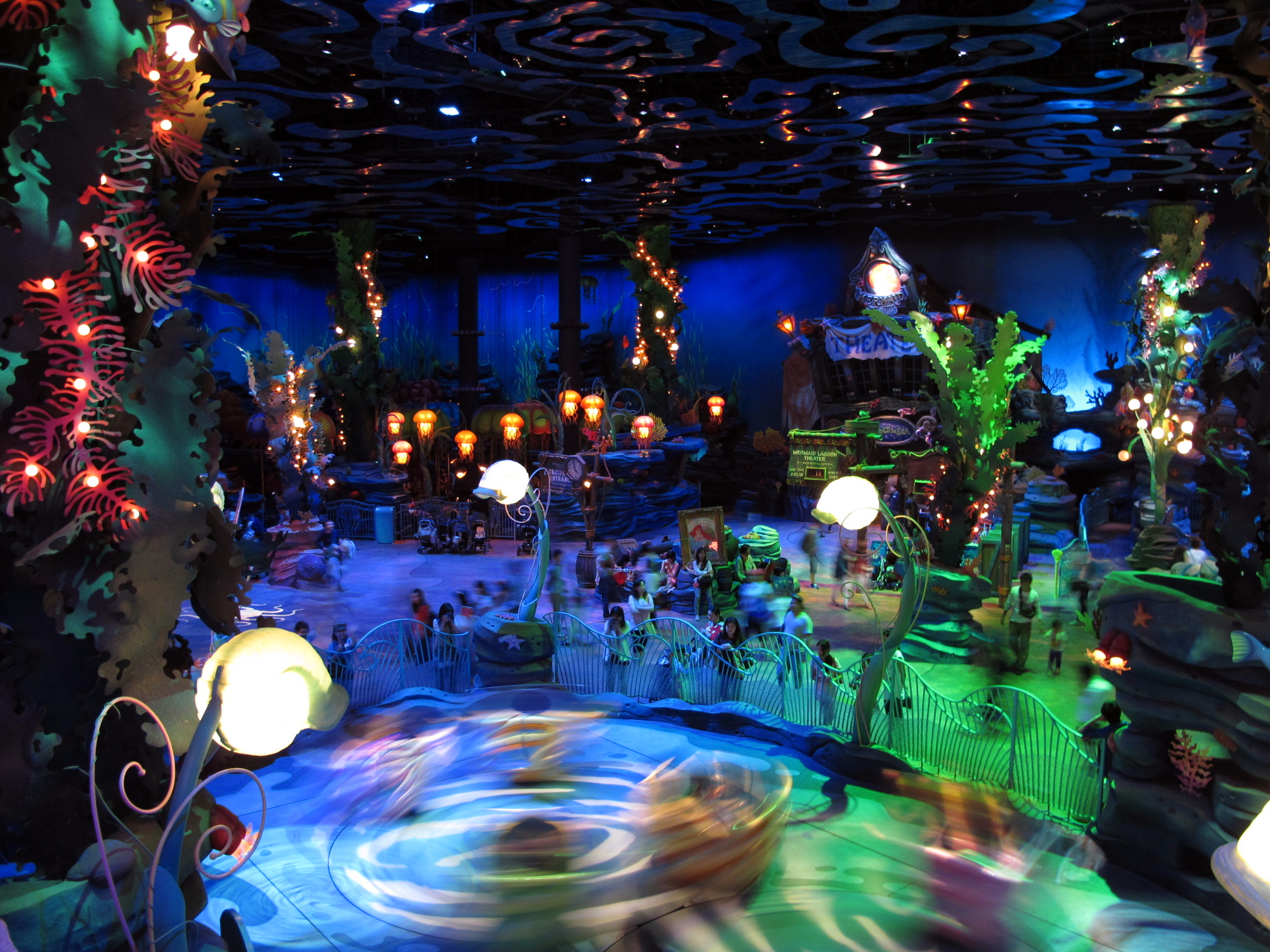
Mermaid Lagoon Interior

Mermaid Lagoon is a "port-of-call" (themed land) at Tokyo DisneySea in the Tokyo Disney Resort, and is themed to Disney's The Little Mermaid franchise.

== Theming ==
The facade is made to look like the Palace of King Triton and features fanciful seashell-inspired architecture. This area is unique in that it is mostly indoors and recreates the feeling of being underwater. Most of the rides in this area are geared towards younger children. Inside Mermaid Lagoon's building, families can ride several flat-rides, explore the Ariel's Playground play area, and it formerly included a live entertainment show.

== Attractions and entertainment ==
=== Indoor Section ===
- Jumpin' Jellyfish
- Blowfish Balloon Race
- The Whirlpool
- Ariel's Playground
- Mermaid Lagoon Theater:
  - Ariel's Grotto - (2005-2020, original outdoor location), (2020–present, current indoor location)

=== Outdoor Section ===
- Scuttle's Scooters: A Caterpillar-type ride, similar to Slinky Dog Zigzag Spin.
- Flounder's Flying Fish Coaster: A small steel roller coaster for children and families.

== Former attractions and entertainment ==
=== Indoor Section ===
- Mermaid Lagoon Theater:
  - Under the Sea (2001-2014)
  - King Triton's Concert (2015-2020)

Notes: Originally scheduled to close on March 31, 2020, the outside location for Ariel's Greeting Grotto closed on January 31, 2020, in response to COVID-19. The area's Mermaid Lagoon Theater then closed on July 1, 2020, and became Ariel's new meet-and-greet location on September 29, 2020.

== Shops ==
- The Sleepy Whale Shoppe
- Mermaid Treasures
- Kiss de Girl Fashions
- Mermaid Memories
- Grotto Photos & Gifts
- Sea Turtle Souvenirs

== Restaurants ==
- Sebastian's Calypso Kitchen: A counter service restaurant that serves pizza, seafood, and sandwiches.
