= Magdalene with Two Flames =

Painting by Georges de La Tour

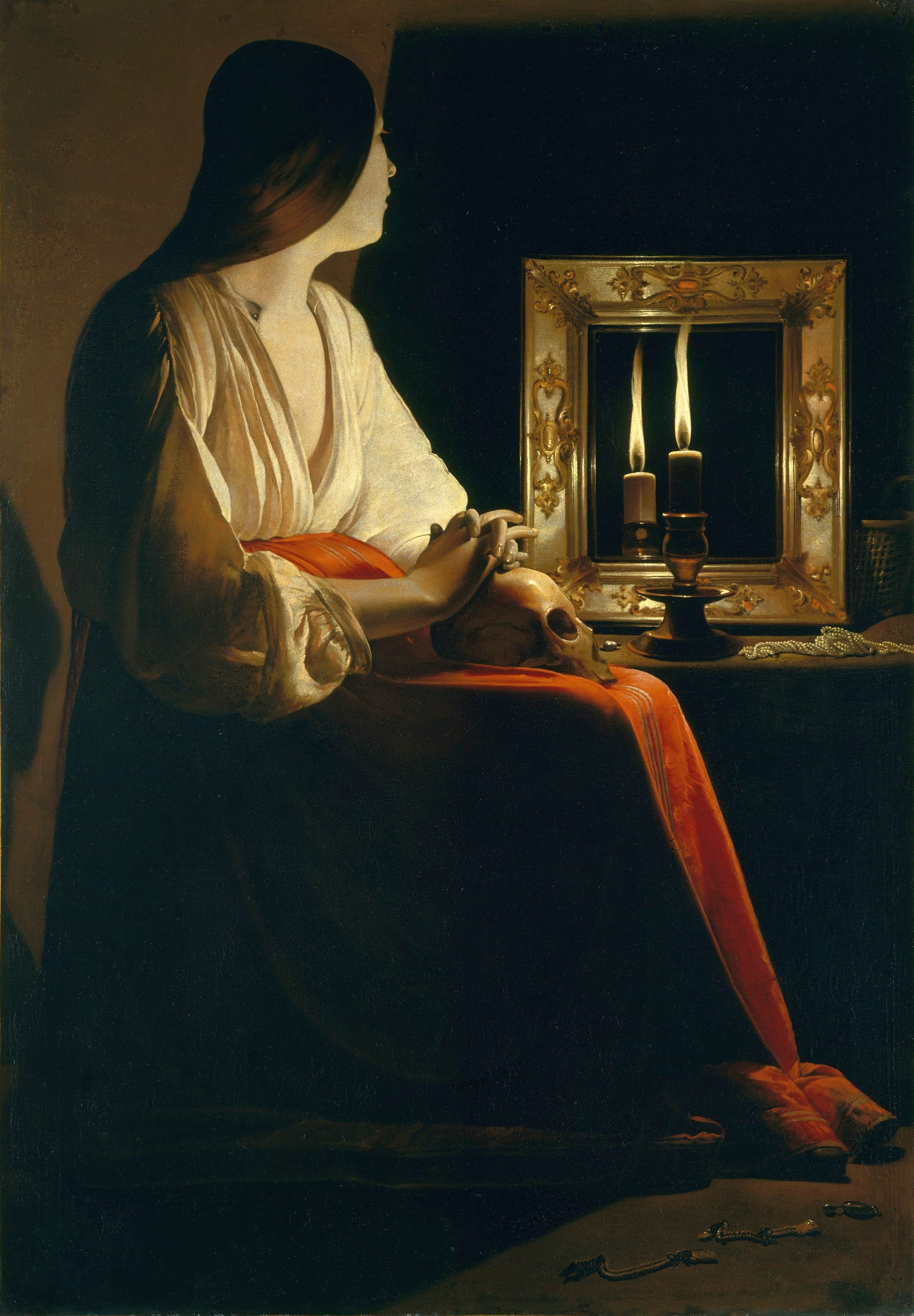
- Artist: Georges de La Tour
- Year: c.1640
- Type: Oil on canvas
- Dimensions: 133.4 cm × 102.2 cm (52.5 in × 40.2 in)
- Location: Metropolitan Museum of Art, New York City

Magdalene with Two Flames or The Penitent Magdalene is an undated oil-on-canvas painting created c.1640 by the French painter Georges de La Tour. In 1978 Mr. and Mrs. Charles Wrightsman gave it to the Metropolitan Museum of Art in New York, where it still hangs.

The painting depicts Mary Magdalene, a companion of Christ, who exchanged her previous worldly lifestyle for a life of penance and contemplation. She is shown, illuminated by a candle, sitting in a meditative pose in front of a mirror. The light from the candle and its reflection create a strong chiaroscuro effect, with the subject's brightly lit face and breast contrasting with the darkness of the rest of the composition.

Both the candle and the human skull she is holding are metaphors for the fragility of life and her discarded jewellery for the meaningless value of worldly possessions and for her atonement.

The work is one of several by the artist featuring a candlelit Mary Magdalene.

== See also ==
- Magdalene at a Mirror (de La Tour, c. 1635–1640)
- Magdalene with the Smoking Flame (de La Tour, 1640)
