= Ariel's Grotto =

Meet-and-greet area at Disney parks

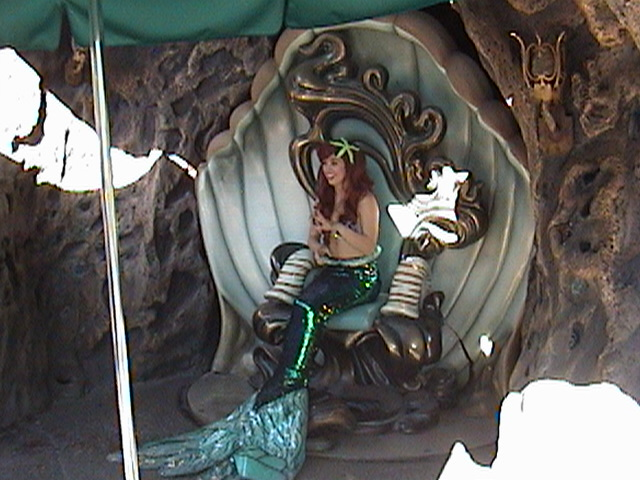
- Meet & Greet with Ariel as it appeared at Disneyland

Disneyland
- Area: Fantasyland
- Status: Removed
- Opening date: 1996
- Closing date: August 17, 2008
- Replaced: Alpine Gardens
- Replaced by: Pixie Hollow

Magic Kingdom
- Area: Fantasyland (Enchanted Forest)
- Status: Operating
- Soft opening date: October 12, 2012 (current)
- Opening date: 1996 (original); December 6, 2012 (current)
- Closing date: April 12, 2010 (original)
- Replaced: 20,000 Leagues Under the Sea: Submarine Voyage
- Replaced by: Pooh's Playful Spot (original)

Disney California Adventure
- Area: Paradise Pier
- Status: Removed
- Opening date: February 9, 2001
- Closing date: January 8, 2018
- Replaced by: Lamplight Lounge

Tokyo DisneySea
- Area: Mermaid Lagoon
- Status: Operating
- Soft opening date: March 14, 2005 (original)
- Opening date: April 15, 2005 (original); September 29, 2020 (current at Mermaid Lagoon Theater)
- Closing date: January 31, 2020 (original)

Ride statistics
- Attraction type: Meet and greet area (Magic Kingdom, Disneyland and Tokyo DisneySea); Restaurant (Disney California Adventure)
- Theme: The Little Mermaid
- Lightning Lane was available

Ariel's Grotto is a meet-and-greet area at several Disney parks, as well as a former restaurant in Disney California Adventure based on Disney Animation's 1989 film The Little Mermaid.

== Disneyland ==
This was formerly a colorful grotto in which Ariel, in mermaid form, was available for autographs and photo opportunities. The meet-and-greet area was decorated with starfish, coral, and waterfalls. King Triton's Fountain leading to the grotto featured a soft-surface "sandy beach" play zone dotted with jumping fountains. On August 17, 2008, the area officially closed. It has now been re-themed to Pixie Hollow, a Disney Fairies meet-and-greet attraction amid oversized 'plants' which gives guests the sense of being the size of a fairy.

The King Triton statue that once spouted water into the ponds was moved to the rooftop of Ariel's Undersea Adventure in Disney California Adventure and is a part of the decor.

== Magic Kingdom ==
In April 2010, the Ariel's Grotto attraction at Magic Kingdom was closed. It reopened as part of the New Fantasyland expansion along with the ride Under the Sea ~ Journey of the Little Mermaid. The similar meet-and-greet sits beside this attraction. It is in a cave, next to Prince Eric's Castle, surrounded by waterfalls and large rock formations. This iteration of the meet-and-greet closed in March 2020 due to the Coronavirus pandemic, and reopened on January 22, 2023.

== Disney California Adventure ==
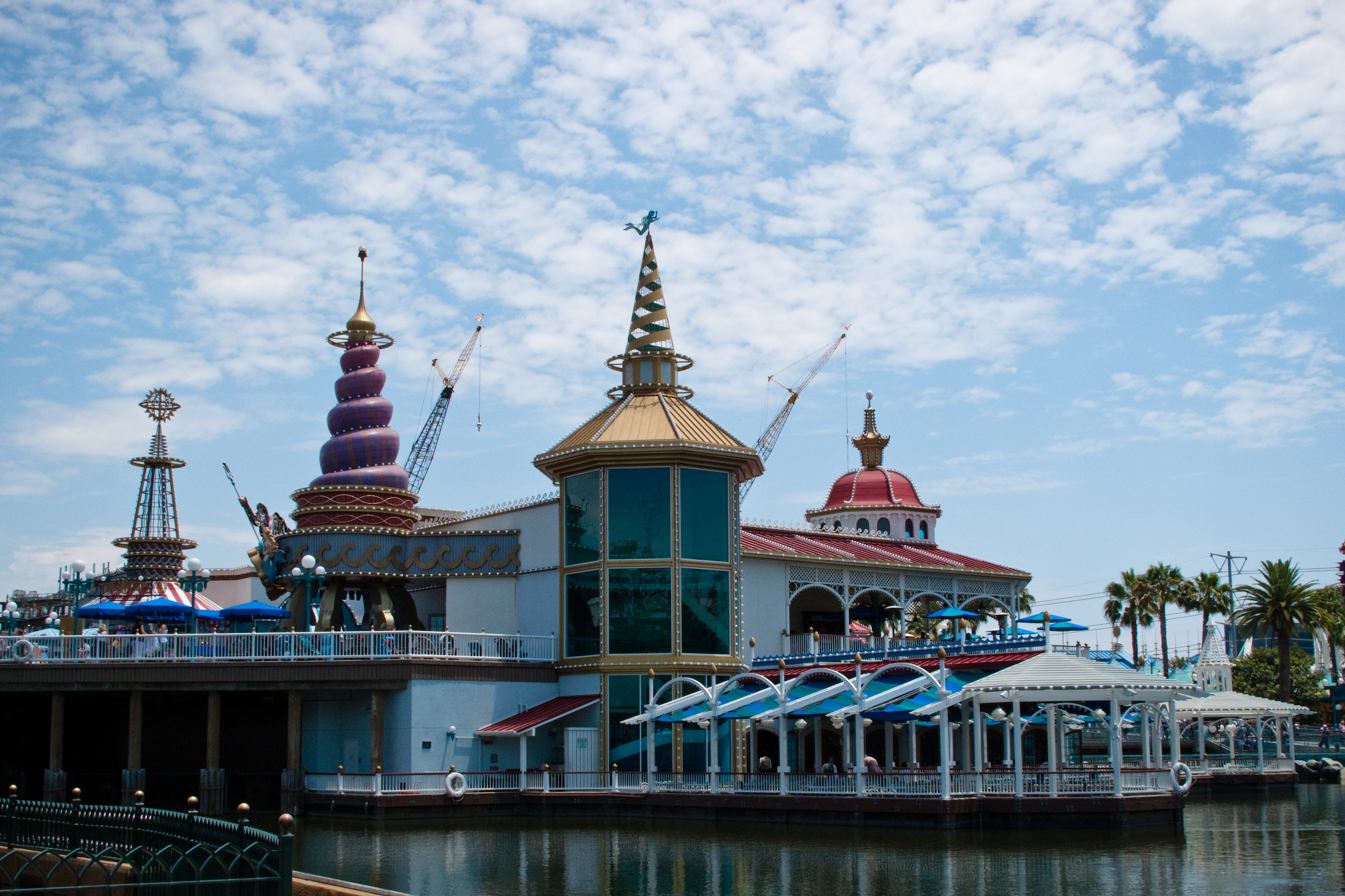
Ariel's Grotto, Paradise Pier, Disney California Adventure in 2010.

Ariel's Grotto was an "under the sea" themed restaurant that offered Character Dining. This gave guests an opportunity to dine with Ariel and other Disney Princesses. The restaurant was located on Paradise Pier, and featured American, Healthy Selections, and Vegetarian cuisine. On January 8, 2018, Ariel's Grotto closed to make way for the Lamplight Lounge, a restaurant that opened with Pixar Pier on June 23, 2018.

== Tokyo DisneySea ==
Ariel's Greeting Grotto was a character meet-and-greet attraction. Originally scheduled to close on March 31, 2020, it was early closed on January 31, 2020, in response to the coronavirus outbreak. However, on September 29, 2020, it was "reopened" inside Mermaid Lagoon Theater as a socially distanced greeting with Ariel in her mermaid form.
