= Mary Magdalene as Melancholy =

Painting by Artemisia Gentileschi

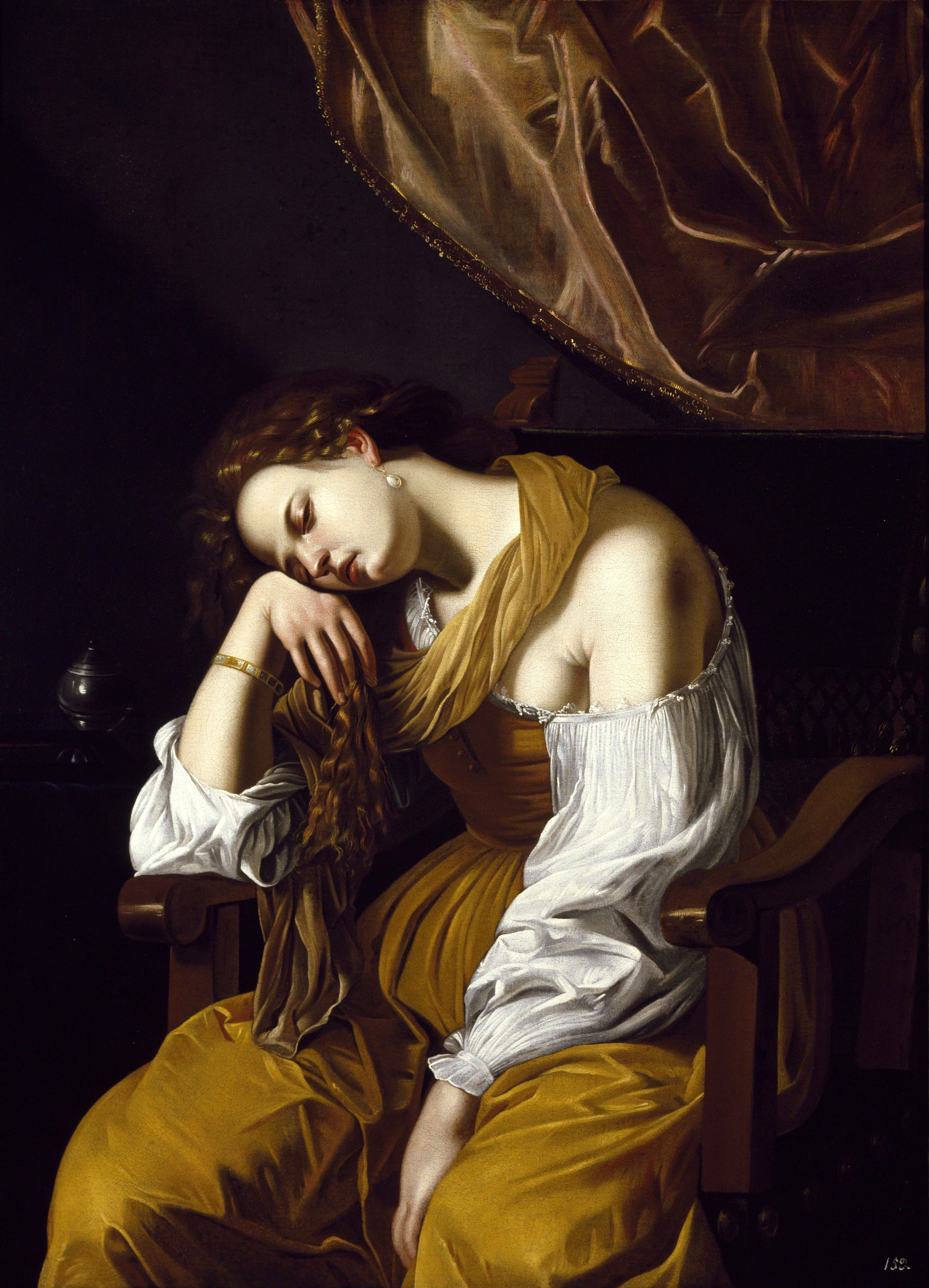
- Artist: Artemisia Gentileschi
- Year: c. 1622 – 1625
- Medium: oil on canvas
- Movement: Baroque
- Dimensions: 100.6 cm × 136.3 cm (39.6 in × 53.7 in)
- Location: Museo Soumaya, Mexico City

Mary Magdalene as Melancholy is a 1622–1625 painting by Artemisia Gentileschi, showing Mary Magdalene as a personification of Melancholia. It is now in the Museo Soumaya in Mexico City.

It is an autograph copy of Penitent Magdalene by the artist now in the Treasury of Seville Cathedral, although X-ray examination has shown that the fabric on the saint's shoulder is wider in the Seville version and was probably added later to fit with the canons of the Catholic Church. This has also demonstrated that the two faces are different - the Mexico City version seems to be a self-portrait by comparison with Judith Slaying Holofernes and Cleopatra - and that there are corrections in the brushstrokes in the Seville version but not in the Mexico City variant.

== See also ==
- List of works by Artemisia Gentileschi
