= The Little Mermaid (1989 film) =

American animated film

- Theatrical release poster by John Alvin
- Directed by: John Musker; Ron Clements
- Written by: John Musker; Ron Clements
- Based on: "The Little Mermaid" by Hans Christian Andersen
- Produced by: Howard Ashman; John Musker
- Starring: René Auberjonois; Christopher Daniel Barnes; Jodi Benson; Pat Carroll; Paddi Edwards; Buddy Hackett; Jason Marin; Kenneth Mars; Ben Wright; Samuel E. Wright
- Edited by: Mark Hester
- Music by: Alan Menken
- Production company: Walt Disney Feature Animation
- Distributed by: Buena Vista Pictures Distribution (Note: Distributed under the Walt Disney Pictures banner, with funding by Silver Screen Partners IV.)
- Release date: November 17, 1989
- Running time: 83 minutes
- Country: United States
- Language: English
- Budget: $40 million
- Box office: $235 million

The Little Mermaid is a 1989 American animated musical fantasy film written and directed by John Musker and Ron Clements and produced by Musker and Howard Ashman, who also wrote the film's songs with composer Alan Menken. Loosely based on the 1837 Danish fairy tale "The Little Mermaid" by Hans Christian Andersen, it was produced by Walt Disney Feature Animation in association with Silver Screen Partners IV and released by Walt Disney Pictures. The film features the voices of René Auberjonois, Christopher Daniel Barnes, Jodi Benson, Pat Carroll, Paddi Edwards, Buddy Hackett, Jason Marin, Kenneth Mars, Ben Wright, and Samuel E. Wright. The story follows a teenage mermaid princess named Ariel (Benson) who dreams of becoming human and falls in love with a human prince named Eric (Barnes), which leads her to forge an agreement with the sea witch Ursula (Carroll) to be with him.

Walt Disney planned to put the story in a proposed package film containing Andersen's stories, but he scrapped the project. In 1985, while working on The Great Mouse Detective (1986), Clements and Musker decided to adapt the fairy tale. They proposed it to Walt Disney Studios chairman Jeffrey Katzenberg, who initially declined because of its similarities to a proposed sequel to the 1984 film Splash, but ultimately approved it. Ashman became involved, and brought in Menken. With supervision from Katzenberg, they made a Broadway-style structure with musical numbers as the staff was working on Oliver & Company (1988). Katzenberg warned that the film would earn less since it appealed to female viewers, but he eventually became convinced that it would be another blockbuster hit for the company.

The Little Mermaid was released in theaters on November 17, 1989, to critical acclaim, earning praise for the animation, music, and characters. It was also a commercial success, garnering $84 million at the domestic box office during its initial release, and $235 million in total lifetime gross worldwide, becoming the sixth-highest-grossing film of 1989. Along with the major successes of The Great Mouse Detective, the 1988 Disney/Amblin live-action/animated film Who Framed Roger Rabbit and Oliver & Company, The Little Mermaid is given credit for revitalizing the art of Disney animated feature films after an uneven period. It also marked the start of the era known as the Disney Renaissance. The film won two Academy Awards for Best Original Score and Best Original Song ("Under the Sea").

The film's success led to a media franchise. A prequel television series aired on CBS from 1992 to 1994. A direct-to-video sequel was released in 2000, focusing on Ariel's daughter Melody. A prequel followed in 2008. The first film was adapted into a stage musical with a book by Doug Wright and additional songs by Alan Menken and new lyricist Glenn Slater opened in Denver in July 2007 and began performances on Broadway January 10, 2008 starring Sierra Boggess. Other derived works and material inspired by the film, include a 2019 live musical presentation on ABC as part of The Wonderful World of Disney, and a 2023 live-action film adaptation directed by Rob Marshall and starring Halle Bailey. In 2022, the film was selected for preservation in the United States National Film Registry by the Library of Congress as being "culturally, historically, or aesthetically significant".

== Plot ==
Under the Atlantic Ocean, in the kingdom of Atlantica, the young mermaid Ariel is fascinated by the human world and collects human artifacts in her grotto. With her best friend Flounder, they both visit Scuttle, a dimwitted seagull who gives inaccurate information about humans. However, her father King Triton, the ruler of Atlantica, says contact between merpeople and humans is forbidden.

One night, Ariel, Flounder, and Sebastian, a crab who serves as Triton's adviser and court composer, travel to the surface to watch a birthday celebration for Prince Eric. Ariel falls in love with Eric at first sight. A storm wrecks the ship and knocks Eric overboard. Ariel rescues Eric and brings him to shore. She sings to him, but leaves just as he regains consciousness to avoid getting caught. Discovering a change in Ariel's behavior, Triton questions Sebastian and learns of her love for Eric. Outraged, Triton travels to Ariel's grotto and destroys her collection of artifacts in a misguided attempt to protect her, causing Ariel to break down in tears.

After a remorseful Triton leaves, Ariel is approached by two eels named Flotsam and Jetsam, who take her to Ursula the sea witch. Ursula makes a deal with Ariel to transform her into a human for three days in exchange for Ariel's voice, which Ursula puts in a nautilus shell. If Ariel receives a "true love's kiss" within that time, she will remain a human permanently. Otherwise, she will turn back into a mermaid and become Ursula's property. Unbeknownst to Ariel, the deal is actually part of a scheme for Ursula to use Ariel as leverage to gain control of the sea. After accepting, Ariel is given human legs and taken to the surface by Flounder and Sebastian.

Eric, who has become fascinated by the woman who saved him, finds Ariel on the beach and takes her to his castle, unaware that she is the one who rescued him earlier due to her inability to speak. Ariel spends time with Eric, and at the end of the second day, they almost kiss but are thwarted by Flotsam and Jetsam. Frustrated by Ariel’s close success, Ursula disguises herself as a young woman named Vanessa and uses Ariel's voice to cast a hypnotic enchantment on Eric that makes him forget about Ariel. The next day, Ariel discovers Eric is to be married to Vanessa, leaving her heartbroken. Then, Scuttle discovers that Vanessa is really Ursula and informs Ariel, who pursues the wedding barge. Sebastian informs Triton, and Scuttle disrupts the wedding with the help of various sea animals. In the chaos, Ursula's shell is destroyed, restoring Ariel's voice and breaking the enchantment over Eric. Realizing that Ariel is the girl who saved his life, Eric rushes to her, but the sun sets before they can kiss and Ariel transforms back into a mermaid.

Turning back into her true form, Ursula claims Ariel. Triton confronts Ursula and demands Ariel's release, but the deal is inviolable. At Ursula's urging, Triton agrees to take Ariel's place as Ursula's prisoner, giving up his trident. Ariel is released as Triton transforms into a polyp and loses his authority over Atlantica. With her true goal complete, Ursula declares herself the Queen of Atlantica, and claims Triton's trident when Eric appears with a harpoon. Ursula attempts to kill Eric, but Ariel intervenes, leading to Ursula accidentally killing Flotsam and Jetsam. Enraged, Ursula uses the trident to grow in size. Ariel and Eric reunite on the surface just before a gigantic Ursula separates them. She then gains full control of the ocean, creating a storm and bringing sunken ships to the surface. Just as Ariel is about to be killed, Eric commandeers a wrecked ship and impales Ursula with its splintered bowsprit. With Ursula dead, Triton and the other polyps in her garden revert to their original forms.

Realizing that Ariel truly loves Eric and the human world, Triton turns her into a human and approves her marriage to Eric. Ariel and Eric marry on a ship and depart, with all of Ariel's friends and family watching them as well.

== Voice cast ==
A promotional image of the principal characters from the film. From left to right: King Triton, Scuttle, Ariel, Prince Eric, Sebastian, Ursula, and Flounder

- René Auberjonois as Chef Louis, Eric's eccentric and unhinged chef who attempts to cook Sebastian, but fails.
- Christopher Daniel Barnes as Prince Eric, a dashing and dreamy human prince who is saved by Ariel and is determined to find and marry her.
- Jodi Benson as Ariel, the 16-year-old adventurous and headstrong mermaid princess of Atlantica who is fascinated with the human world and falls in love with Prince Eric.
  - Benson also has an uncredited voice role as Vanessa, Ursula's human alter-ego and disguise she uses to sabotage her deal with Ariel.
- Pat Carroll as Ursula, a manipulative and dastardly sea witch who takes Ariel's voice in exchange for turning her into a human, planning to use Ariel as ransom to get her father's magical trident and take over Atlantica.
- Paddi Edwards as Flotsam and Jetsam, Ursula's symbiotic and insidious pet green moray eels.
- Buddy Hackett as Scuttle, a seagull who shares Ariel's fascination with humans and teaches her about "human stuff".
- Jason Marin as Flounder, a yellow tropical fish resembling a royal angelfish, who is Ariel's best friend.
- Kenneth Mars as King Triton, Ariel's strict and overprotective father and the ruler of Atlantica who is prejudiced towards humans.
- Edie McClurg as Carlotta, Eric's good-hearted and gentle maid.
- Will Ryan as Harold, a seahorse who serves as Triton's herald.
- Ben Wright as Grimsby, Eric's no-nonsense and loyal steward. Wright had played characters in previous Disney films like Roger Radcliffe in One Hundred and One Dalmatians and Rama in The Jungle Book. This was his last role; he died four months before the film's release.
- Samuel E. Wright as Sebastian, a red Jamaican-accented Caribbean crab who serves as King Triton's advisor and court composer.

Frank Welker has an uncredited role as Max, Eric's excitable pet sheepdog who's the first to know that Ariel's the girl who saved his owner's life.

== Production ==
=== Writing ===
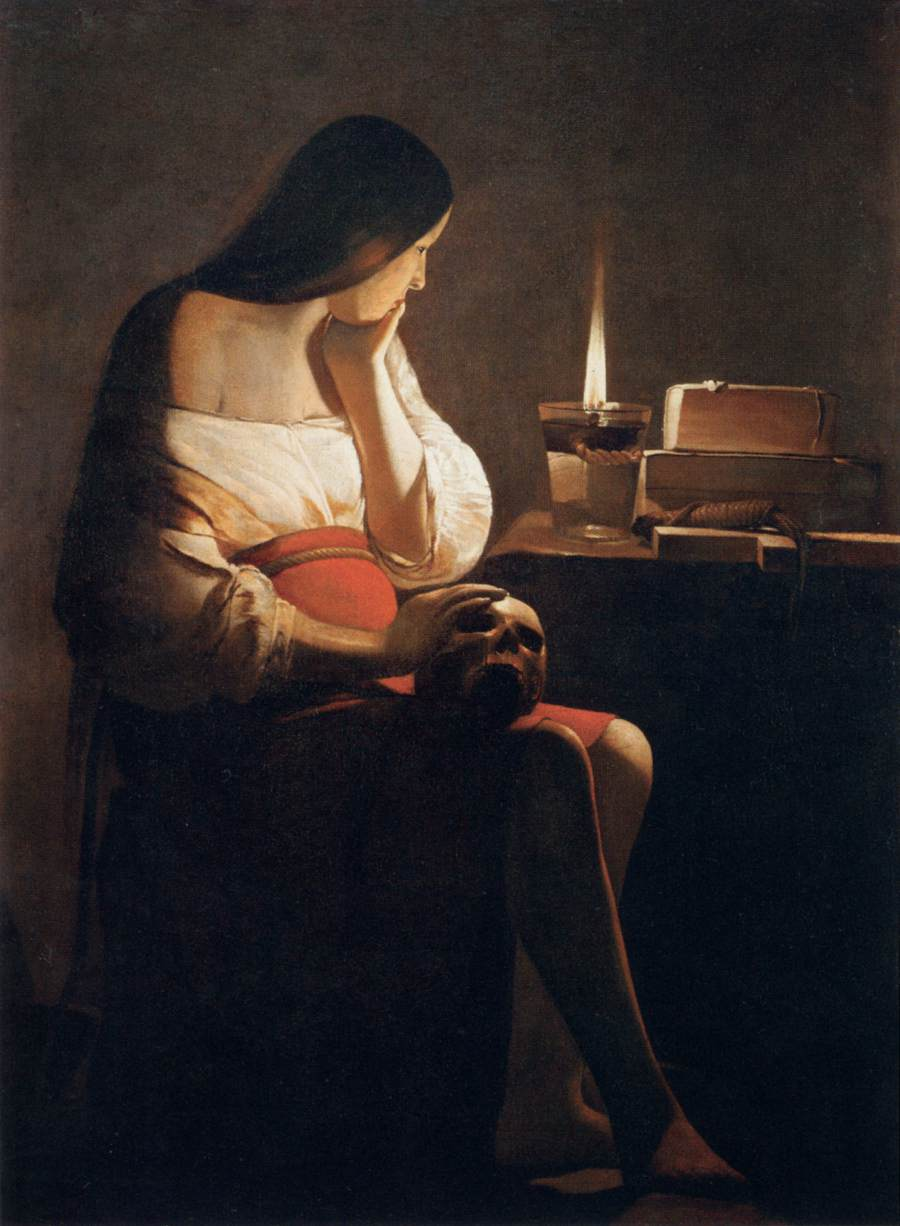
Georges de La Tour's 1640 painting Magdalene with the Smoking Flame is shown in the film.

The Little Mermaid was originally planned as part of one of Walt Disney's earliest feature films, a proposed package film featuring vignettes of Hans Christian Andersen tales. Development started soon after Snow White and the Seven Dwarfs in the late 1930s but was cancelled due to various circumstances.

In 1985, Ron Clements became interested in a film adaptation of "The Little Mermaid" while he was serving as a director on The Great Mouse Detective (1986) with John Musker. Clements discovered the Hans Christian Andersen fairy tale while browsing through a bookstore. Believing the story provided an "ideal basis" for an animated feature film and keen on creating a film that took place underwater, Clements wrote and presented a two-page treatment of The Little Mermaid at Walt Disney Studios to chief Jeffrey Katzenberg at a "gong show" idea suggestion meeting. Katzenberg passed over the proposal because at that time the studio was in development on a sequel to their live-action mermaid comedy Splash (1984) and felt The Little Mermaid would be too similar a project. The next day, however, Katzenberg approved of the idea for possible development, along with Oliver & Company. While in production in the 1980s, the staff found by chance original story and visual development work done by Kay Nielsen for Disney's proposed 1930s Andersen feature. Many of the changes made by the staff in the 1930s to Hans Christian Andersen's original story were coincidentally the same as the changes made by Disney writers in the 1980s.

That year, Clements and Musker expanded the two-page idea into a 20-page rough script, eliminating the role of the mermaid's grandmother and expanding the roles of the Merman King and the sea witch. However, the film's plans were momentarily shelved as Disney focused its attention on Who Framed Roger Rabbit and Oliver & Company as more immediate releases. In 1987, songwriter Howard Ashman became involved with the writing and development of The Little Mermaid after he was asked to contribute a song to Oliver & Company. He proposed changing the minor character Clarence, the English-butler crab, to a Jamaican crab and shifting the music style throughout the film to reflect this. At the same time, Katzenberg, Clements, Musker, and Ashman revised the story format to make The Little Mermaid a musical with a Broadway-style story structure, with the song sequences serving as the tentpoles of the film. Ashman and composer Alan Menken, both noted for their work as the writers of the successful Off-Broadway stage musical Little Shop of Horrors, teamed up to compose the entire song score. In 1988, with Oliver & Company out of the way, The Little Mermaid was slated as the next major Disney release.

=== Animation ===
More money and resources were dedicated to The Little Mermaid than any other Disney animated film in decades. Aside from its main animation facility in Glendale, California, Disney opened a satellite feature animation facility during the production of The Little Mermaid in Lake Buena Vista, Florida (near Orlando, Florida), within Disney-MGM Studios Theme Park at Walt Disney World. Opening in 1989, the Disney-MGM facility's first projects were to produce an entire Roger Rabbit cartoon short, Roller Coaster Rabbit, and to contribute ink and paint support to The Little Mermaid. Another first for recent years was the filming of live actors and actresses for motion reference material for the animators, a practice used frequently for many of the Disney animated features produced under Walt Disney's supervision. Sherri Lynn Stoner, a former member of Los Angeles' Groundlings improvisation comedy group, and Joshua Finkel, a Broadway actor, performed key scenes as Ariel and Eric respectively. Having been cast as Ariel in early 1988, Jodi Benson recorded the character's dialogue and songs in advance, which were subsequently used as playback to guide the live-action references. Before Benson was cast, Melissa Fahn was considered for the part.

The Little Mermaid's supervising animators included Glen Keane and Mark Henn on Ariel, Duncan Marjoribanks on Sebastian, Andreas Deja on King Triton, and Ruben Aquino on Ursula. Originally, Keane had been asked to work on Ursula, as he had established a reputation for drawing large, powerful figures, such as the bear in The Fox and the Hound (1981) and Professor Ratigan in The Great Mouse Detective (1986). Keane, however, was assigned as one of the two lead artists on the petite Ariel and oversaw the "Part of Your World" musical number. He jokingly stated that his wife looks exactly like Ariel "without the fins." The character's body type and personality were based upon those of Alyssa Milano, then starring on TV's Who's the Boss? and the effect of her hair underwater was based on both footage of Sally Ride when she was in space, and scenes of Stoner in a pool for guidance in animating Ariel's swimming. Many of Stoner's mannerisms also became part of Ariel's character, such as the way she bit her lip or the way she expressed through hand gestures.

The underwater setting required the most special effects animation for a Disney animated feature since Fantasia in 1940. Effects animation supervisor Mark Dindal estimated that over a million bubbles were drawn for this film, in addition to the use of other processes such as airbrushing, backlighting, superimposition, and some computer animation. The artistic manpower needed for The Little Mermaid required Disney to farm out most of the underwater bubble effects animation in the film to Pacific Rim Productions, a China-based firm with production facilities in Beijing. The Little Mermaid was the final Disney film to use a multiplane camera, though the work was done by an outside facility as Disney's cameras were not functional at the time.

The Little Mermaid is the last Walt Disney Animation Studios feature film to use the traditional hand-painted cel method of animation. Disney's next film, The Rescuers Down Under, used a digital method of coloring and combining scanned drawings developed for Disney by Pixar called CAPS/ink & paint (Computer Animation Production System), which would eliminate the need for cels, the multiplane camera, and many of the optical effects used for the last time in The Little Mermaid. Clements and Musker's next film, Aladdin, also used digital coloring via CAPS. A CAPS/ink & paint prototype was used experimentally on a few scenes in The Little Mermaid, and one shot produced using CAPS/ink & paint—the penultimate shot in the film, of Ariel and Eric's wedding ship sailing away under a rainbow—appears in the finished film. Computer-generated imagery was used to create some of the wrecked ships in the final battle, a staircase behind a shot of Ariel in Eric's castle, and the carriage Eric and Ariel are riding in when she bounces it over a ravine. These objects were animated using 3D wireframe models, which were plotted as line art to cels and painted traditionally. The film being both the only film of the Disney Renaissance and the last in the studio's history overall to use the xerography technology used since 1961 with One Hundred and One Dalmatians made it a transitional film between the two Disney eras.

=== Casting ===
The design of the villainous Ursula was based upon drag performer Divine. An additional early inspiration before Divine was Joan Collins in her role as Alexis Carrington in the television series Dynasty, due to a suggestion from Howard Ashman, who was a fan of the series. Pat Carroll was not Clements and Musker's first choice to voice Ursula; the original script had been written with Bea Arthur of the Disney-owned TV series The Golden Girls in mind. After Arthur turned the part down, actresses including Nancy Marchand, Nancy Wilson, Roseanne Barr, Charlotte Rae and Elaine Stritch were considered for the part. Stritch was eventually cast as Ursula, but clashed with Howard Ashman's style of music production and was replaced by Carroll. Various actors auditioned for additional roles in the film, including Jim Carrey for the role of Prince Eric, and comedians Bill Maher and Michael Richards for the role of Scuttle.

=== Music ===
The Little Mermaid was considered by some as "the film that brought Broadway into cartoons". Alan Menken wrote the Oscar-winning score, and collaborated with Howard Ashman on the songs. One of the film's most prominent songs, "Part of Your World", was nearly cut from the film when it seemingly tested poorly with children, who became rowdy during the scene. This caused Jeffrey Katzenberg to feel that the song needed to be cut, an idea that was resisted by Musker, Clements, Ashman, and Keane. Both Musker and Clements cited the similar situation of the song "Over the Rainbow" nearly being cut from 1939's The Wizard of Oz when it was appealing to Katzenberg. Keane pushed for the song to remain until the film was in a more finalized state. During a second test screening, the scene, now colorized and further developed, tested well with a separate child audience, and the musical number was kept.

== Release ==
The film was originally released on November 17, 1989; there was a subsequent re-release on November 14, 1997. After the success of the 3D re-release of The Lion King, Disney announced a theatrical 3D re-release of The Little Mermaid scheduled for September 13, 2013, but this was cancelled on January 14, 2013, due to the underperformances of other Disney 3D re-releases. The 3D version was released on Blu-ray instead, but it did play a limited engagement at the El Capitan Theatre from September to October 2013. On September 20, 2013, The Little Mermaid began playing in select theaters where audiences could bring iPads and use an app called Second Screen Live. AMC Theatres screened the movie from September 6–12, 2019. The film was also screened out of competition at the 1990 Cannes Film Festival.

=== Home media ===
In a then-atypical and controversial move for a new Disney animated film, The Little Mermaid was released as part of the Walt Disney Classics line of VHS, LaserDisc, Betamax and Video 8 home media releases on May 18, 1990, six months after the release of the film. Before The Little Mermaid, only a select number of Disney's catalog animated films had been released to home media, as the company was afraid of upsetting its profitable practice of theatrically reissuing each film every few years. The Little Mermaid became that year's top-selling title on home video, with over 10 million units sold (including 7 million in its first month) and 13 million units by October 1993. The home video release, along with box office and merchandise sales, contributed to The Little Mermaid generating a total revenue of $1 billion. This success led to future Disney animated films being released on home video soon after the end of their theatrical runs, rather than delayed for several years, making The Little Mermaid the first Disney animated feature to be released on home video 1 year after its theatrical release.

Following The Little Mermaid's November 14, 1997 re-release in theaters, a new VHS version was released on March 31, 1998, as part of the Walt Disney Masterpiece Collection and included a bonus music video of Jodi Benson singing "Part of Your World" during the end credits, replacing "Under the Sea" as the end credits song. The VHS sold 13 million units and ranked as the third best-selling video of the year.

The Little Mermaid was released in a "bare-bones" Walt Disney Limited Issue DVD on December 7, 1999, with a standard video transfer. The film was re-released on DVD on October 3, 2006, as part of the Walt Disney Platinum Editions of features, alongside the music video for the cover version of "Kiss The Girl" performed by Ashley Tisdale. Deleted scenes and several in-depth documentaries were included, as well as an Academy Award-nominated short film intended for the shelved Fantasia 2006, The Little Matchgirl. The DVD sold 1.6 million units on its first day of release, and over 4 million units during its first week, making it the biggest animated DVD debut for October. By the year's end, the DVD had sold about 7 million units and was one of the year's top 10 selling DVDs. The Walt Disney Platinum Edition DVD was released as part of a "Little Mermaid Trilogy" boxed set on December 16, 2008. The Walt Disney Platinum Edition of the film, along with its sequels, went on moratorium in January 2009. The film was re-released on a 3-disc Blu-ray/DVD/Digital Copy combo, a 2-disc Blu-ray/DVD combo and 3D Blu-ray on October 1, 2013, as part of the Walt Disney Diamond Edition line. The Little Mermaid was re-released on HD and 4K digital download on February 12, 2019, with a physical media re-release on Blu-ray and Ultra HD Blu-ray on February 26, 2019, as part of the Walt Disney Signature Collection of the film's 30th anniversary.

=== Live presentations ===
In June 2016, Disney held special presentations of the film at the Hollywood Bowl in Los Angeles, titled The Little Mermaid in Concert. The performances combined a screening of The Little Mermaid with live accompaniment by guest musicians and celebrities, including Sara Bareilles (who performed as Ariel), Tituss Burgess (who performed as Sebastian as a reprisal of his role in the stage adaptation), Darren Criss (who performed as Prince Eric), Rebel Wilson (who performed as Ursula), Joshua Colley (who performed as Flounder), John Stamos (who performed as Chef Louis) and Norm Lewis (who performed as King Triton as a reprisal of his role in the stage adaptation). The four additional songs written for the stage adaptation were also incorporated into the presentation, accompanied by scenes of the film's original concept art. During the third and final performance, Jodi Benson replaced Bareilles to reprise her original role as Ariel, while Brad Kane (the singing voice of the title character of Aladdin) and Susan Egan (who played Belle in the stage adaptation of Beauty and the Beast) also made special appearances, singing songs from their respective films, and a duet of "A Whole New World".

From May 17–18, 2019, the Hollywood Bowl hosted another live presentation, titled The Little Mermaid: An Immersive Live-to Film Concert Experience. These performances once again combined a screening of the film with live renditions of the film's songs, this time starring Lea Michele as Ariel, Harvey Fierstein as Ursula, Cheech Marin as Chef Louis, Ken Page as Sebastian, Peter Gallagher as King Triton, Leo Gallo as Prince Eric, Joshua Turchin as Flounder, and an uncredited actor as Scuttle. This presentation utilized the some songs written for the screen adaptation and some from the stage adaptation, including Joshua Turchin singing "She's in Love" from the Broadway adaptation, The Little Mermaid.

== Reception ==
=== Box office ===
Early in the production of The Little Mermaid, Jeffrey Katzenberg cautioned Clements, Musker, and their staff, telling them that since The Little Mermaid was a "girl's film", it would make less money at the box office than Oliver & Company, which had been Disney's biggest animated box office success in a decade. However, by the time the film was closer to completion, Katzenberg was convinced The Little Mermaid would be a hit and the first animated feature to earn more than $100 million in its initial run and become a "blockbuster" film.

During its original 1989 theatrical release, The Little Mermaid made $6.1 million in its opening weekend, ranking in third place behind Look Who's Talking and Harlem Nights and beating out Don Bluth's All Dogs Go to Heaven which was released on the same weekend as The Little Mermaid. In its second weekend, the film remained in third with $8.4 million behind Harlem Nights and Back to the Future Part II. Throughout the initial run, it earned $84.4 million at the North American box office, falling short of Katzenberg's expectations but earning 64% more than Oliver & Company and becoming the animated film with the highest gross from its initial run. The film was theatrically reissued on November 14, 1997, on the same day as Anastasia, a Don Bluth and Gary Goldman animated feature for Fox Animation Studios and 20th Century Fox. For this release, it ranked in third place behind The Jackal and Starship Troopers, collecting $9.8 million during its first weekend. The reissue brought $27.2 million in additional gross. The film also drew $123 million in box office earnings outside the United States and Canada between both releases, resulting in a total international box office figure of $235 million.

=== Critical reception ===
The Little Mermaid was released to widespread acclaim, receiving praise from film critics particularly for its music. Review aggregation site Rotten Tomatoes reported that the film has a 92% approval score based on 126 reviews and an average rating of 8.3/10. The site's consensus reads "The Little Mermaid ushered in a new golden era for Disney animation with warm and charming hand-drawn characters and catchy musical sequences." On Metacritic, the film has a weighted average score of 88 out of 100 based on 24 critics, indicating "universal acclaim".

Roger Ebert of the Chicago Sun-Times was enthusiastic about the film, writing, "The Little Mermaid is a jolly and inventive animated fantasy—a movie that's so creative and so much fun it deserves comparison with the best Disney work of the past." Ebert also commented positively on the character of Ariel, stating she "is a fully realized female character who thinks and acts independently, even rebelliously, instead of hanging around passively while the fates decide her destiny." Gene Siskel of the Chicago Tribune wrote, "While the story won't win any prizes from the women's liberation movement, the animation is so full and colorful and the songs so beguiling that this is a case of where someone made one like they used to. The drawing of the evil octopus witch who is jealous of the mermaid's singing voice is particularly outstanding." Janet Maslin of The New York Times praised the film as a "marvel of skillful animation, witty songwriting and smart planning. It is designed to delight filmgoers of every conceivable stripe... Adults will be charmed by the film's bright, outstandingly pretty look and by its robust score. Small children will be enchanted by the film's sunniness and by its perfect simplicity."

Variety magazine praised the film for its cast of characters, Ursula in particular, as well as its animation, stating that the animation "proves lush and fluid, augmented by the use of shadow and light as elements like fire, sun and water illuminate the characters." They also praised the musical collaboration between Howard Ashman and Alan Menken "whose songs frequently begin slowly but build in cleverness and intensity." During the film's 1997 re-release, Hal Hinson of The Washington Post wrote a mixed review, referring to it as a "likably unspectacular adaptation of the Hans Christian Andersen classic."

The staff of TV Guide wrote a positive review, praising the film's return to the traditional Disney musical as well as the film's animation. However, they also wrote that the film is compromised by the juvenile humor and the human characters' eyes. While still giving a positive review, the staff stated that the film "can't compare to the real Disney classics (which appealed equally to both kids and adults)." Todd Gilchrist of IGN wrote a positive review of the film, stating that the film is "an almost perfect achievement". Gilchrist also praised how the film revived interest in animation as it was released at a time when interest in that format was at a lull. Empire gave a positive review of the film, stating that "[The Little Mermaid is] a charmer of a movie, boasting all the ingredients that make a Disney experience something to treasure yet free of all the politically correct, formulaic elements that have bogged down the more recent productions."

In April 2008 – 19 years after the film's initial release in 1989 – Yahoo! users voted The Little Mermaid as No. 14 on the top 30 animated films of all time. In June, that same year, the film remained on the list but dropped six slots to end at #20. (Only three other traditionally animated Disney animated films - Aladdin, Beauty and the Beast, and The Lion King, respectively - scored above it in the poll even after the update.) In 2011, Richard Corliss of Time magazine named it one of "The 25 All-TIME Best Animated Films".

=== Accolades ===
The film earned three Academy Award nominations, making it the first Disney animated film to earn nominations since The Rescuers in 1977.

Bolstered by the film's success and the soundtrack's award wins, it was certified double platinum by the Recording Industry Association of America in September 1990 for shipments of two million copies of the soundtrack album, an unheard of feat for an animated film at the time. To date, the soundtrack has been certified six times platinum.

List of awards and nominations
Award	Category	Nominee(s)	Result	Ref.
Academy Awards	Best Original Score	Alan Menken	Won	
Academy Awards	Best Original Song	"Kiss the Girl"; Music by Alan Menken; Lyrics by Howard Ashman	Nominated	
Academy Awards	Best Original Song	"Under the Sea"; Music by Alan Menken; Lyrics by Howard Ashman	Won	
Artios Awards	Outstanding Achievement in Feature Film Casting – Comedy	Mary V. Buck and Susan Edelman	Nominated	
BMI Film & TV Awards	Film Music Award	Alan Menken	Won	
Golden Globe Awards	Best Motion Picture – Musical or Comedy		Nominated	
Golden Globe Awards	Best Original Score	Alan Menken	Won	
Golden Globe Awards	Best Original Song	"Kiss the Girl"; Music by Alan Menken; Lyrics by Howard Ashman	Nominated	
Golden Globe Awards	Best Original Song	"Under the Sea"; Music by Alan Menken; Lyrics by Howard Ashman	Won	
Golden Reel Awards	Best Sound Editing – Animated Feature		Won	
Golden Screen Awards			Won	
Grammy Awards	Best Recording for Children	The Little Mermaid: Original Walt Disney Records Soundtrack – Various Artists	Won	
Grammy Awards	Best Recording for Children	The Little Mermaid Read-Along – Roy Dotrice	Nominated	
Grammy Awards	Best Instrumental Composition Written for a Motion Picture or for Television	The Little Mermaid: Original Walt Disney Records Soundtrack – Alan Menken	Nominated	
Grammy Awards	Best Song Written Specifically for a Motion Picture or Television	"Kiss the Girl" – Alan Menken and Howard Ashman	Nominated	
Grammy Awards	Best Song Written Specifically for a Motion Picture or Television	"Under the Sea" – Alan Menken and Howard Ashman	Won	
Los Angeles Film Critics Association Awards	Best Animation	John Musker and Ron Clements	Won	
Online Film & Television Association Awards	Film Hall of Fame: Productions		Inducted	
Online Film & Television Association Awards	Film Hall of Fame: Songs	"Under the Sea"	Inducted	
Satellite Awards	Outstanding Youth DVD		Won	
Young Artist Awards	Best Family Motion Picture – Adventure or Cartoon		Won	

== Legacy ==
=== Importance ===
The Little Mermaid, which was Disney's first animated fairy tale since Sleeping Beauty (1959), is an important film in animation history for many reasons. It was instrumental in re-establishing feature-length animation as a profitable venture for the Walt Disney Company, as the company's theme parks, television productions, and live-action features had overshadowed the animated output since the 1950s. The Little Mermaid was the second film, following Oliver & Company, produced after Disney began expanding its animated output following its successful live action/animated film Who Framed Roger Rabbit, and became Disney's first animated major box office and critical hit since The Jungle Book (1967), 22 years earlier. Walt Disney Feature Animation was further expanded as a result of The Little Mermaid and increasingly successful follow-ups – Beauty and the Beast (1991), Aladdin (1992), and The Lion King (1994). The staff increased from 300 members in 1988 to 2,200 in 1999 spread across three studios in Burbank, California, Lake Buena Vista, Florida, and Montreuil, Seine-Saint-Denis, France.

In addition, The Little Mermaid signaled the re-establishment of the musical film format as a standard for Disney animated films. The majority of Disney's most popular animated films from the 1930s on had been musicals, though by the 1970s and 1980s the role of music had been de-emphasized in the films. 1988's Oliver & Company had served as a test of sorts to the success of the musical format before Disney committed to the Broadway-style structure of The Little Mermaid.

In 2022, the film was selected for preservation in the United States National Film Registry by the Library of Congress as being "culturally, historically, or aesthetically significant".

=== Theme parks ===
Ariel is a meet-and-greet character appearing at Disney theme parks around the world, including in specific meet-and-greet locations such as Ariel's Grotto. A dark ride based on the film, Ariel's Undersea Adventure, opened at both Disney California Adventure at the Disneyland Resort and Magic Kingdom at Walt Disney World in 2011 and 2012, respectively. Both attractions tell the story of the film by taking riders through scenes based on the film's various musical numbers. Various live entertainment shows based on the film can be found at Disney theme parks worldwide, including Voyage of the Little Mermaid at Disney's Hollywood Studios and King Triton's Concert at Tokyo DisneySea. The Mermaid Lagoon land at Tokyo DisneySea is also based on the film.

== Other media ==
=== Television series ===
A prequel animated series based on the film premiered in late 1992 on the CBS television network, following Ariel's adventures before the events of the film.

=== Sequel and prequel ===
A direct-to-video sequel, titled The Little Mermaid II: Return to the Sea, was released on September 19, 2000. The plot focuses on Ariel's daughter, Melody, who longs to be a part of the ocean world. A direct-to-video prequel, titled The Little Mermaid: Ariel's Beginning, was released in 2008. The story is set before the events of the original film, in which King Triton has banned music from Atlantica.

=== The Little Mermaid Live! ===
The Wonderful World of Disney: The Little Mermaid Live was set to air on October 3, 2017, and would have featured a broadcast of the film with a similar format to the Hollywood Bowl concerts. However, on August 3, 2017, it was announced that the special had been dropped due to budget issues. The project was revived to commemorate the 30th anniversary of the film's original release, and was aired on November 5, 2019. Auliʻi Cravalho, Queen Latifah and Shaggy starred as Ariel, Ursula and Sebastian, respectively. Other cast members included John Stamos as Chef Louis and Graham Phillips as Prince Eric. The special featured performances of songs from the film and its Broadway adaptations in a themed "dive-in theater" setting at the Disney lot, accompanied by the film itself. It was produced by Done and Dusted, with director-executive producer Hamish Hamilton. In addition to marking the film's anniversary, the special was also used as a pre-launch promotional push for the new Disney+ streaming service, which was launched on November 12, 2019.

=== Live-action film adaptation ===
In May 2016, Deadline Hollywood reported that Disney was in early development for a live-action adaptation of the film directed by Rob Marshall, with a screenplay by David Magee and Jane Goldman, and a story written by Magee, Marshall and John DeLuca. Alan Menken returns as composer and penned new songs alongside Lin-Manuel Miranda, who also serves as a co-producer alongside Marc Platt, Marshall and DeLuca. Halle Bailey stars as Ariel along with Jonah Hauer-King, Javier Bardem and Melissa McCarthy, with Daveed Diggs, Jacob Tremblay and Awkwafina in voice roles. Filming wrapped on July 11, 2021, and the film was released on May 26, 2023.

== See also ==
- The Little Mermaid (franchise)
- Mermaids in popular culture
- List of films about witchcraft
- List of Disney theatrical animated feature films
- List of Disney animated films based on fairy tales
