= Penitent Magdalene (El Greco) =

Painting by El Greco

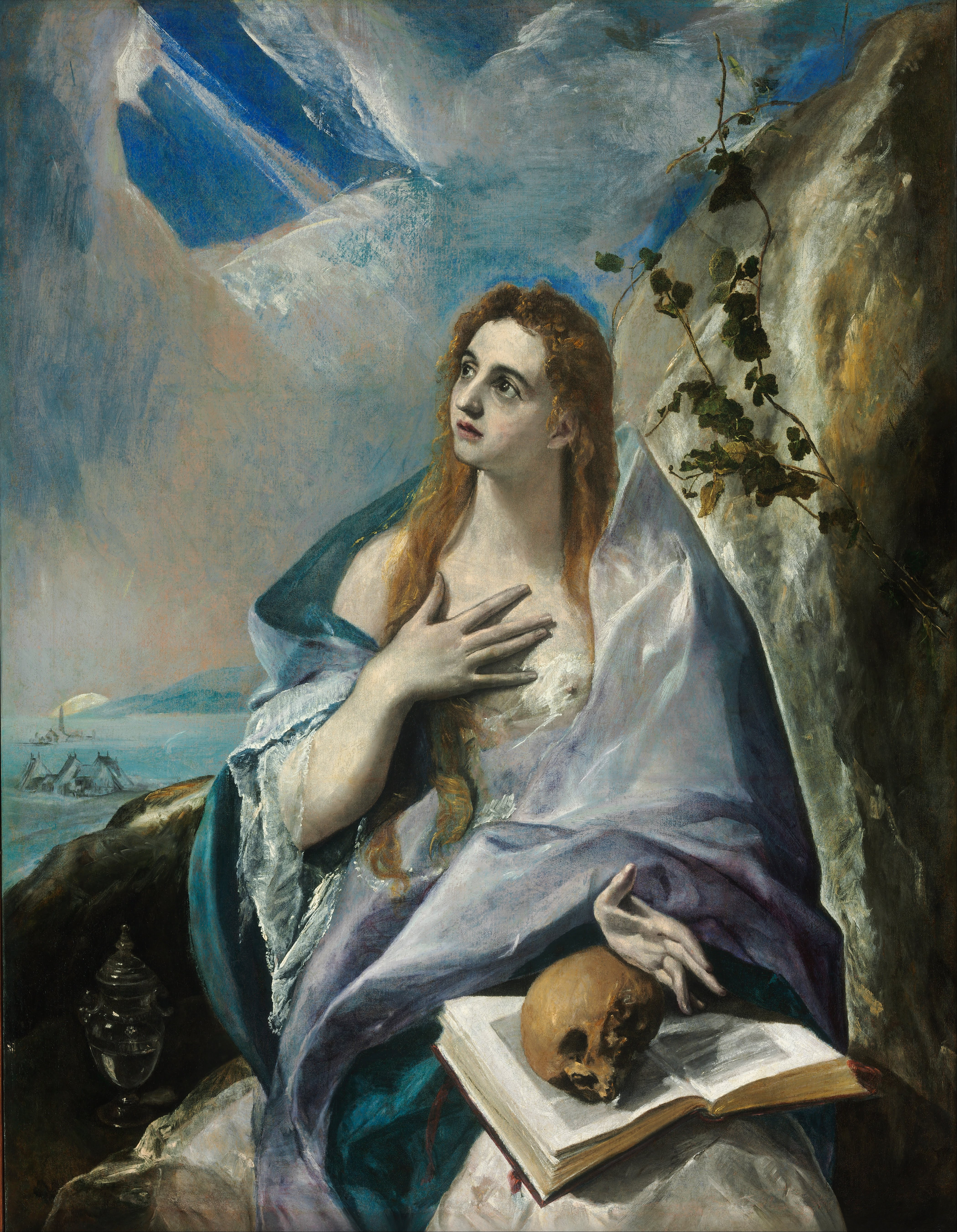
- Artist: El Greco
- Year: 1576–1578
- Medium: oil on canvas
- Dimensions: 164 cm × 121 cm (65 in × 48 in)
- Location: National Museum of Fine Arts, Budapest

Penitent Magdalene is a 1576–1578 painting by El Greco depicting Mary Magdalene, produced during his first period in Toledo and showing the major influence of Titian on him at that time. It is now in the Museum of Fine Arts in Budapest.

== Variants ==
A c. 1577 version is now in the Worcester Art Museum, whilst a later c.1580–1585 version is in the Nelson-Atkins Museum of Art in Kansas City. A different composition on the subject from 1585–1590 is in the Cau Ferrat Museum.

== See also ==
- List of works by El Greco

== Bibliography ==
- (in Spanish) ÁLVAREZ LOPERA, José, El Greco, Madrid, Arlanza, 2005, Biblioteca «Descubrir el Arte», (colección «Grandes maestros»).
- (in Spanish) SCHOLZ-HÄNSEL, Michael, El Greco, Colonia, Taschen, 2003. ISBN 978-3-8228-3173-1
