= Penitent Magdalene (Artemisia Gentileschi) =

Painting by Artemisia Gentileschi

- Artemisia Gentileschi, "Penitent Mary Magdalene," 1625–26. Oil on canvas, 42 3/4 x 36 3/4 in. (108.8 x 93 cm). Kimbell Art Museum
- Artist: Artemisia Gentileschi
- Year: 1625-1626
- Medium: Oil on canvas
- Dimensions: 108.8 cm × 93 cm (42.8 in × 37 in)
- Location: Kimbell Art Museum, Fort Worth, Texas, USA

Penitent Magdalene is a painting by the Italian artist Artemisia Gentileschi. It hangs in the Kimbell Art Museum in Fort Worth, Texas, having been acquired by the museum in 2024. It was originally acquired by Fernando Afán de Ribera in the 17th century and displayed in his Seville residence. The painting later disappeared, but was recently rediscovered in exceptional condition. She returned to the subject later in the 1620s in Mary Magdalene as Melancholy.

== Provenance ==
The painting's first home was the collection of Fernando Enriquez Afan de Ribera, the 3rd Duke of Alcala, from 1626 to 1637. He purchased the painting in Rome while he was ambassador to the Holy See during 1625-1626. In 1626, he became viceroy of Naples, and then later returned to Seville in 1631.

== See also ==
- List of works by Artemisia Gentileschi

== Sources ==
- Bissell, R. Ward (1999). Artemisia Gentileschi and the Authority of Art : Critical Reading and Catalogue Raisonné. University Park, Pa.: Pennsylvania State University Press. ISBN 9780271017877.
- Christiansen, Keith; Mann, Judith Walker (2001). Orazio and Artemisia Gentileschi. New York; New Haven: Metropolitan Museum of Art; Yale University Press. ISBN 1588390063.
