= Saint John the Baptist (Donatello) =

Sculpture by Donatello

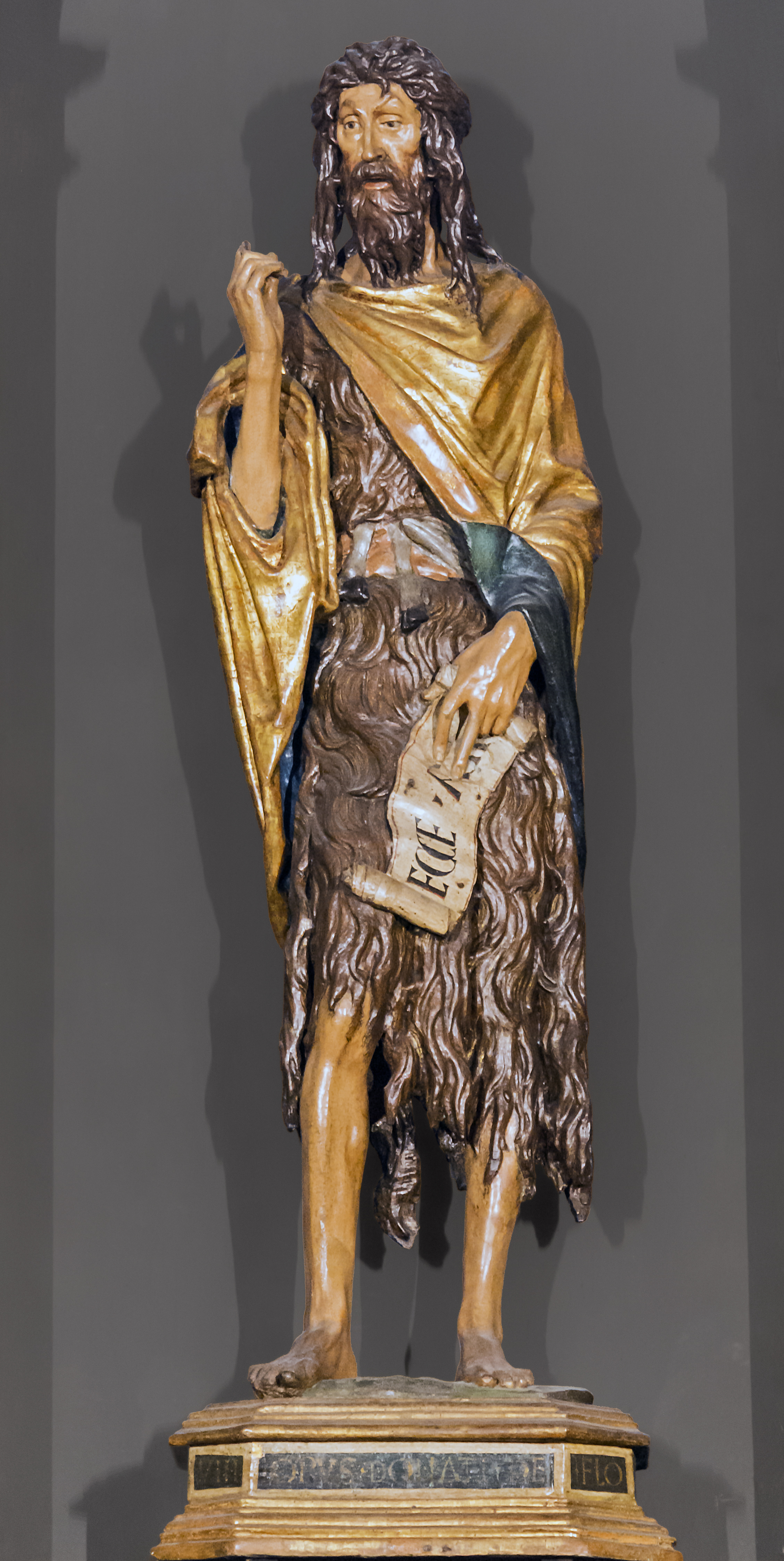
- Artist: Donatello
- Year: 1438
- Medium: Wood
- Location: Santa Maria Gloriosa dei Frari, Venice

Saint John the Baptist is a painted wood statue of 1438 by the Florentine Italian Renaissance sculptor Donatello. It remains in its original site in the Frari Church in Campo del Friari in the San Polo district of Venice, Italy.

The sculpture was restored in 1973, at which time the sculptor's signature and dating of the work were rediscovered, and again in 2024 by Save Venice Inc. Carved in Florence, it is the sculptor's only work in Venice. Although the original installation of the statue is unclear, it is presently located on the altar of the chapel of the Florentine community in the Basilica dei Frari, on the right side of the transept.

The saint is shown in a hair shirt with animal pelts, with a golden cloak atop. Extending from his right hand is an unfurled scroll which reads ECCE AGNUS DEI ('Behold the Lamb of God').
