= Magdalene at a Mirror =

Painting by Georges de La Tour

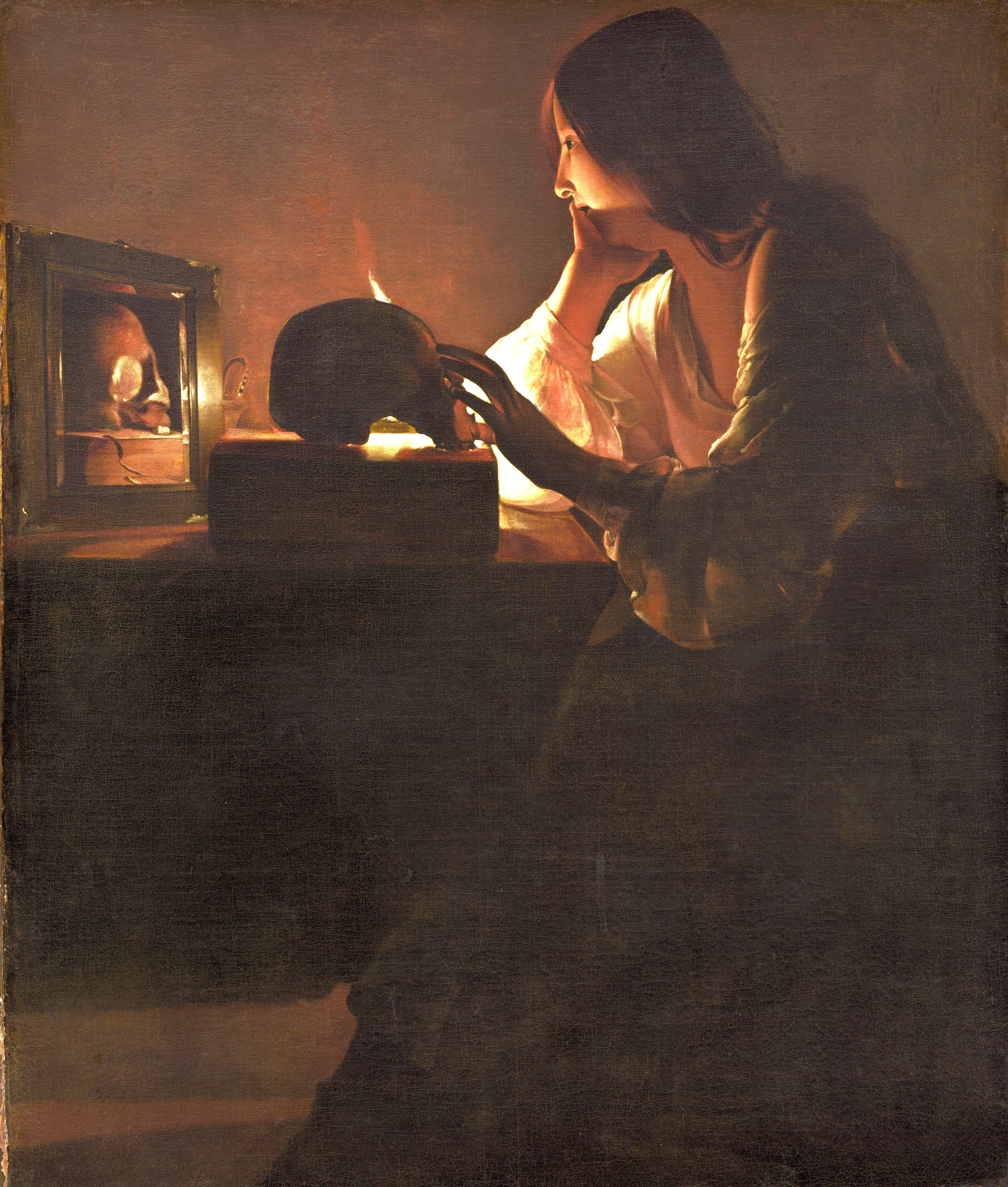
Magdalene at a Mirror (c. 1635–1640) by Georges de La Tour

Magdalene at a Mirror or The Repentant Magdalene is a c. 1635–1640 oil-on-canvas painting by the French artist Georges de La Tour. It passed from the Marquise de Caulaincourt to the Comtesse d'Andigné in 1911, before being bought in 1936 by André Fabius – it is sometimes known as The Fabius Magdalene as a result. It was then unattributed but Louvre experts attributed it to de la Tour in 1937. Fabius could not find a buyer in France and so in 1964 sold it to the National Gallery of Art in Washington, where it still hangs, though this caused a legal case since Fabius had not sought an export licence to remove the work from France.

The painting depicts Mary Magdalene, a follower of Christ, who exchanged her previous lifestyle for a life of penance and contemplation. She is shown, illuminated by a candle, sitting and meditating in front of a mirror, the light from a candle creating a chiaroscuro effect, with the subject's brightly lit features contrasting with the darkness of the rest of the composition. Both the candle and the human skull on which her hand is resting are metaphors for the brevity and fragility of life.

== Sources ==
- Conisbee, Philip. “An Introduction to the Life and Art of Georges de La Tour,” in Philip Conisbee (ed.), Georges de La Tour and His World, exh. cat. Washington, DC, National Gallery of Art; Fort Worth, Kimbell Art Museum 1996, pp. 13–147.
- Judovitz, Dalia. “Georges de La Tour and the Enigma of the Visible”, New York, Fordham University Press, 2018. ISBN 0-82327-744-5; ISBN 9780823277445.
