= Dolphin (disambiguation) =

Dolphin is a common name of aquatic mammals within the infraorder Cetacea.

Dolphin, Dolphins, The Dolphin or The Dolphins may also refer to:

== Arts and entertainment ==
=== Film ===
- Dolphin (film), a 2023 South Korean drama
- Dolphins (2000 film), an IMAX documentary
- Dolphins, a 2007 film starring Karl Davies
- The Dolphins (film), a 2014 comedy-drama feature film

=== Literature ===
- The Dolphin (student publication), a publication of John B. Lacson Foundation Maritime University
- The Dolphin, a 1973 book of poems by Robert Lowell
- The Dolphin (fairy tale), a French literary fairy tale by Madame d'Aulnoy

=== Music ===
- Dolphin Stradivarius, a violin built by Antonio Stradivari in 1714
- Dolphin (musician), Russian hip hop artist Andrey Vyacheslavovich Lysikov (born 1971)
- The Dolphins (band), an American jazz fusion band
- "The Dolphin", a jazz standard composed by Luiz Eça
- "The Dolphins" (song), a 1966 single by Fred Neil
- The Dolphin (album), by Stan Getz, 1981
- "Dolphin", a song from the 1970 album Parallelograms by Linda Perhacs
- "Dolphin", a song from the 1994 album Change Giver by Shed Seven
- "Dolphin", a song from the 1995 album The Gold Experience by Prince
- "Dolphin", a song from the 2019 album Buoys by Panda Bear
- "Dolphins", a song from the 2021 re-release of the 2011 EP It's Time
- "Dolphins", a song from the 2005 album Black & White 050505 by Simple Minds

=== Other uses in arts and entertainment ===
- Dolphin (character), a DC Comics superheroine
- Dolphin (video game), a 1983 Atari 2600 video game
- Dolphins (M. C. Escher), a 1923 woodcut print
- The Dolphins (sculpture), 1975, by David Moore

== Businesses ==
- Dolphin Air, a charter airline based in Dubai, United Arab Emirates
- The Dolphin Company, operator of habitats and parks, including, Miami Seaquarium
- Dolphin Cruise Line, based in Greece
- Dolphin Energy, an Abu Dhabi gas company
- Dolphin Gas Project, a GCC gas project
- Dolphin Hotel, Plymouth, Devon, England
- Dolphin Hotel, Southampton, Hampshire, England
- The Dolphin, Hackney, London, England
- Dolphin Interconnect Solutions, a manufacturer of high-speed data communication systems
- Dolphin Music, an online retailer of musical instruments and recording equipment
- Byford Dolphin, a drilling rig
- Dolphin Mall, in Miami, Florida, US
- Walt Disney World Dolphin, a hotel resort in Florida, US
- Gulliver's Tavern, Bournemouth, Dorset, England, formerly called Dolphin
- Pub names in Great Britain#Puns, jokes and corruptions

== Computing ==
- Dolphin (emulator), an open-source GameCube and Wii emulator
- Dolphin (file manager), an open source file manager
- Dolphin Browser, a web browser for Android mobile devices
- Nintendo GameCube (codename "Dolphin")

== Military ==
=== Aviation ===
- Sopwith Dolphin, a British First World War fighter plane
- Eurocopter AS365 Dauphin
- Harbin Z-9, NATO reporting name "Haitun", translates to dolphin

=== Navy ===
- HMS Dolphin, several ships of the Royal Navy
- USS Dolphin, several ships of the U.S. Navy
- Dolphin-class submarine, of the Israeli Navy
- Dolphin, one of the Queensland Maritime Defence Force Auxiliary Gunboats
- Dolphin (weapon), an ancient naval ramming weapon
- "Dolphins", the common name for Submarine Warfare insignia

== People ==
- Dolphin (surname), including a list of people with the name
- Dolphin D. Overton (1926–2013), US Air Force Korean War flying ace

== Places ==
- Dolphin, Virginia, US, an unincorporated community
- Dolphin Township, Knox County, Nebraska, US
- Dolphin Town, Isles of Scilly, England, a hamlet
- Dolphin, Flintshire, a village in the community of Brynford, Wales
- Cape Dolphin, Falkland Islands
- Dolphin Island (disambiguation), including a list of islands in various countries
- Dolphin Lighthouse, off the coast of Mumbai, India
- Dolphin Square, a large London apartment block, UK

== Sports ==
- Australian Swim Team, nicknamed the Dolphins
- Daikyo Dolphins, a member of the defunct Australian Baseball League
- Dolphin F.C. (Dublin), a former Irish football team
- Dolphin RFC, an Irish rugby union team based in Cork
- Dolphins BC, a basketball club in Botswana
- Dolphins F.C. (Port Harcourt), a Nigerian football team
- Dolphins United F.C., a football club in the Philippines
- Dolphins (Pakistani cricket team), cricket team in Pakistan
- Dolphins (South African cricket team), the KwaZulu Natal cricket team in South Africa
- Dolphins (NRL), a professional rugby league team based in Queensland, Australia
- Dräger Dolphin, a recreational rebreather
- Frankston Football Club, nicknamed The Dolphins, an Australian rules football club
- Jacksonville Dolphins, Jacksonville University's athletic teams
- Karachi Dolphins, a Pakistani cricket team
- Miami Dolphins, a professional American football team in the National Football League
- Nagoya Diamond Dolphins, a Japanese basketball team
- Norrköping Dolphins, a professional Swedish basketball club
- Paderborn Dolphins, an American football club from Paderborn, Germany
- PCU Dolphins, the senior athletic teams of Philippine Christian University
- Redcliffe Dolphins, Australian rugby league team
- Ulsan Hyundai Mipo Dockyard Dolphins FC, a South Korean football team

== Transportation ==
=== Aircraft ===
- De Havilland Dolphin, a 1930s British prototype light biplane
- Eurocopter MH-65 Dolphin, a helicopter used by the US Coast Guard

=== Automobiles ===
- Brilliance Dolphin, a 2014–2015 Chinese city car
- BYD Dolphin, a 2021–present Chinese electric subcompact hatchback
- BYD Dolphin Mini, a 2023–present Chinese electric subcompact hatchback
- Karry Dolphin, a 2019–present Chinese electric commercial van
- Sipani Dolphin, a 1982–1997 Indian subcompact hatchback

=== Watercraft ===
- Dolphin (1922 yacht), later HMCS Lynx
- Dolphin 15 Senior, an American sailing dinghy design
- Douglas Dolphin, a 1930s amphibious flying boat

=== Other uses in transportation ===
- Dolphin and Walrus (locomotives), of the Groudle Glen Railway, Isle of Man
- Florida State Road 836, known as the Dolphin Expressway

== Other uses ==
- Dolphin School (disambiguation), various schools in several countries
- Dolphin (structure), a man-made marine structure not connected to shore
- Dolphin shorts or Dolfins, a style of unisex shorts for athletics
- List of storms named Dolphin, the name of 4 tropical cyclones
- Senecio 'Hippogriff', a houseplant known as "dolphin plant" because of the shape of its leaves

== See also ==
- Mahi-mahi or common dolphinfish
- Pompano dolphinfish
- Dolphin gull
- NMS Delfinul ('The Dolphin'), a Second World War Romanian submarine
- Romanian submarine Delfinul ('The Dolphin'), a Kilo-class submarine
- Dolphin class (disambiguation)
- Delfin (disambiguation)
- Delfinen (disambiguation)
- Delfino (disambiguation)
- Dolfijn (disambiguation)
- Dolfin (disambiguation)
- Delphinus (disambiguation)
- Dauphin (disambiguation)
