= Delfin =

Delfin or Delfín may refer to:

== People ==
- Delfin (surname)
- Delfin N. Bangit (1955–2013), Filipino general
- Delfín Benítez Cáceres (1910–2004), Paraguayan football player and coach
- Delfin Castro (born 1925), Filipino general
- Delfin Chamorro (1863–1931), Paraguayan educator
- Delfín Fernández Martínez (born 1948), Spanish musician
- Delfín Gallo (1845–1889), Argentine politician
- Delfin Jaranilla (1883–1980), Filipino lawyer and judge
- Delfin Lorenzana (born 1948), Filipino government administrator
- Delfín Mosibe (born 1992), Equatoguinean football player
- Delfín Quishpe (born 1977), Ecuadorian singer

Fictional

- Delfin Borja, a character in the Philippine drama series FPJ's Ang Probinsyano

== Places ==
- Delfin Albano, Isabela, Philippines
- Delfin Basin, Mexico

== Military ==
- Delfin-class submarine, several submarine classes
- Greek submarine Delfin (1912) a submarine launched in 1912
- Greek submarine Delfin (Y-9) a submarine launched as HMS Vengeful in 1944, renamed on transfer to Greece in 1945
- Russian submarine Delfin, the first combat-capable Russian submarine
- Spanish submarine Delfin (S61), a submarine launched in 1972 and now converted into a museum ship
- Aero L-29 Delfín, a Czechoslovak military trainer aircraft

== Other uses ==
- Delfin (EP), an EP by Serbian band Smak
- Delfin (Australian company), an Australian property developer
- Delfin (holding company), an Italian investment holding company based in Luxembourg controlled by the Del Vecchio family
- Delfín S.C., an Ecuadorian football club

== See also ==
- Delfim
- Delphin (disambiguation)
- Dolfin (disambiguation)
- Dolphin (disambiguation)
