= Delfim =

Delfim may refer to

== People ==
- Delfim (given name)
- Delfim (surname)

== Ships ==
- Delfim-class submarine, a class of Portuguese Navy submarines
- NRP Delfim, the name of more than one ship of the Portuguese Navy

== Other uses ==
- O Delfim, a Portuguese film directed by Fernando Lopes

== See also ==
- Delfin
