= Delfin (surname) =

Delfin is a Spanish surname of Italian origin, which means "dolphin". Variants of the name include Delfini, Dolfin, and Delfino. The name may refer to:

- Giovanni Dolfin, 57th Doge of Venice.
- Flaminio Delfín, 16th century commander of the Papal Armies.
- Daniel Delfín, 17th century cardinal of the Catholic Church.
- Daniel Andrea Delfín, 18th century Statesman and diplomat.
- Juan María Delfín, 18th century captain of the Spanish Armada.
- Remigio Delfín, 20th century Mexican naval businessman and diplomat.
- Eusebio Delfín, Cuban banker and musician.

== See also ==
- Delfin (disambiguation)
