= Dolphin class =

Dolphin class may refer to several classes of submarine named after the dolphin:

- Delfin-class submarine (disambiguation), the name given to a number of different submarine classes
- Delta-class submarine, four classes of nuclear ballistic missile submarines operated by the Soviet and Russian navies since the 1960s. The submarines are sometimes referred to as the Dolphin class
- Dolfijn or Dolphin-class submarine, a class of four submarines operated by the Royal Netherlands Navy from 1954 until 1992
- Dolphin-class submarine, a class of six submarines based on the German Type 209 submarine design and in operation or being built for the Israeli Sea Corps since 1998

== See also ==
- Dolphin (disambiguation)#Military for individual surface vessels and submarines of this name
- HMS Dolphin, the name of sixteen ships of the Royal Navy, including a submarine base
- USS Dolphin, the name of seven ships of the United States Navy, including two submarines
