= The Otherness =

Argentinian rock band

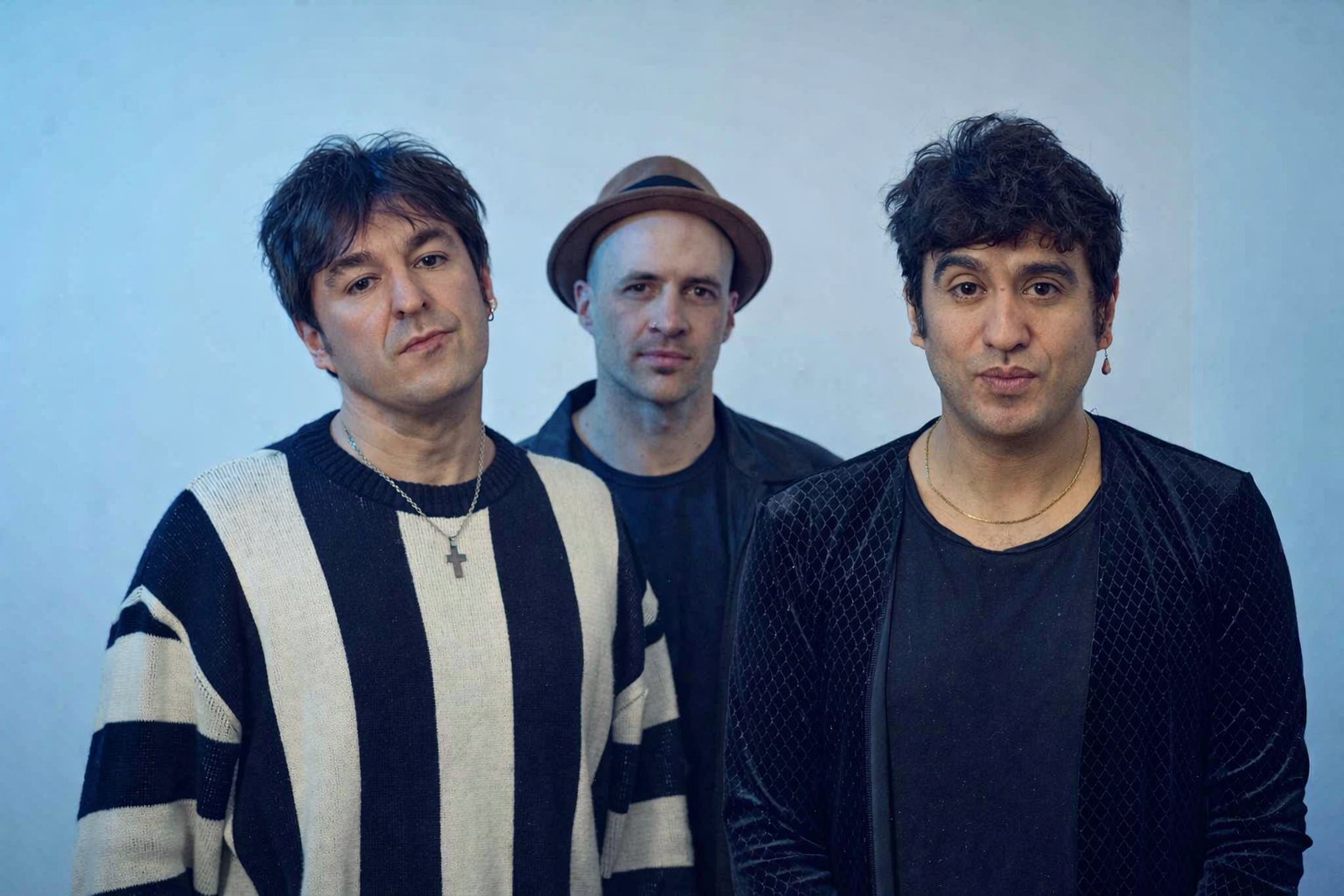
The Otherness: from left to right, Martin, Pablo and Gon.

The Otherness are an Argentinian band from Comodoro Rivadavia, Patagonia, composed of Martin Cativa (guitar, vocals), Gonzalo Cativa (bass, vocals) and Pablo Gaggioni (drums). They have toured across Latin America and Europe, releasing their debut album LMIRL in 2021 via Motor Music.

== History ==
The Otherness were formed by brothers Gonzalo Cativa and Martin Cativa, alongside drummer Pablo Gaggioni. Hailing from Patagonia, they felt unable to tour locally at first due to what they saw as the lack of a flourishing club scene at hand and began to look further afield.

The band undertook their first tour across the United Kingdom in 2011. One of their first UK shows took place at The Water Rats in London's King's Cross, where they played alongside The Sex Pistols’ Glen Matlock.

They began to pick up traction with UK media – gaining coverage from the NME, whose writer Damian Jones described them as sounding "like Gruff Rhys fronting The Beach Boys". Music journalist and Goldblade / The Members frontman John Robb (musician) described them as “like a punk rock take on the early Beatles”.

In 2013, the band played a free show in aid of The Dolphin pub in Hackney, London, raising awareness of the venue's uncertain future after police had applied for a review of its licence. They released a new four-track EP, Come On that same year. Reviewing for Louder Than War, Mark Ray described the band as “like the missing link between The Beatles and The Clash.” On the same tour, the band performed at London's 100 Club as part of a ‘Future Rock’ event.

The Otherness released a live demo record, The Otherness Live Session, in 2015. It was recorded over a single evening in Buenos Aires and featured covers of Lead Belly’s Poor Howard and James Brown's "It's a Man's Man's Man's World".

The band played Sheffield’s Tramlines festival in 2018, following an invite from promoter Neil Hargreaves. They performed on the festival’s Crystal Stage, after festival staff had seen the band’s performance at the local Frog And Parrot venue.

Throughout the spring and summer of 2019 The Otherness embarked on a tour across the UK, Germany, Austria and The Netherlands. One show saw them performing at London's Electric Brixton as part of La Linea Latin Music Fest, in support of longstanding ska / Latin crossover pioneers Los Auténticos Decadentes.

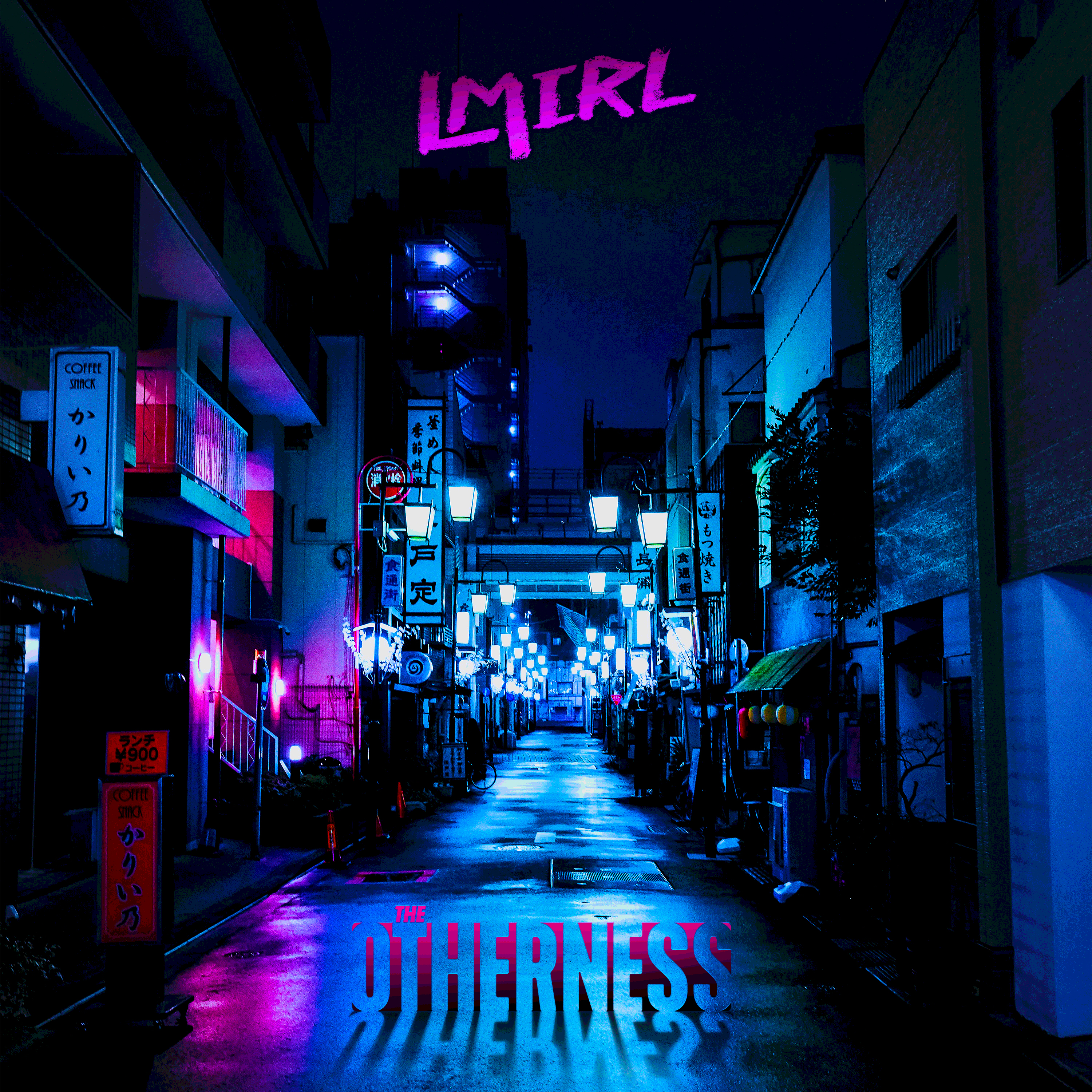
"LMIRL" (Let's Meet In Real Life) debut album by The Otherness.

During the Coronavirus pandemic - following the cancellation of a European tour - the band signed to German independent label Motor Music. In 2021 the band announced their debut album LMIRL (standing for ‘Let’s Meet In Real Life’), slated for an October 1 worldwide release. The album was produced by Gaspar Benegas in Buenos Aires and mastered by Felix Davis at London's Metropolis studios.

The band have been featured in significant Latin American media, such as Clarin, and the TN television channel.

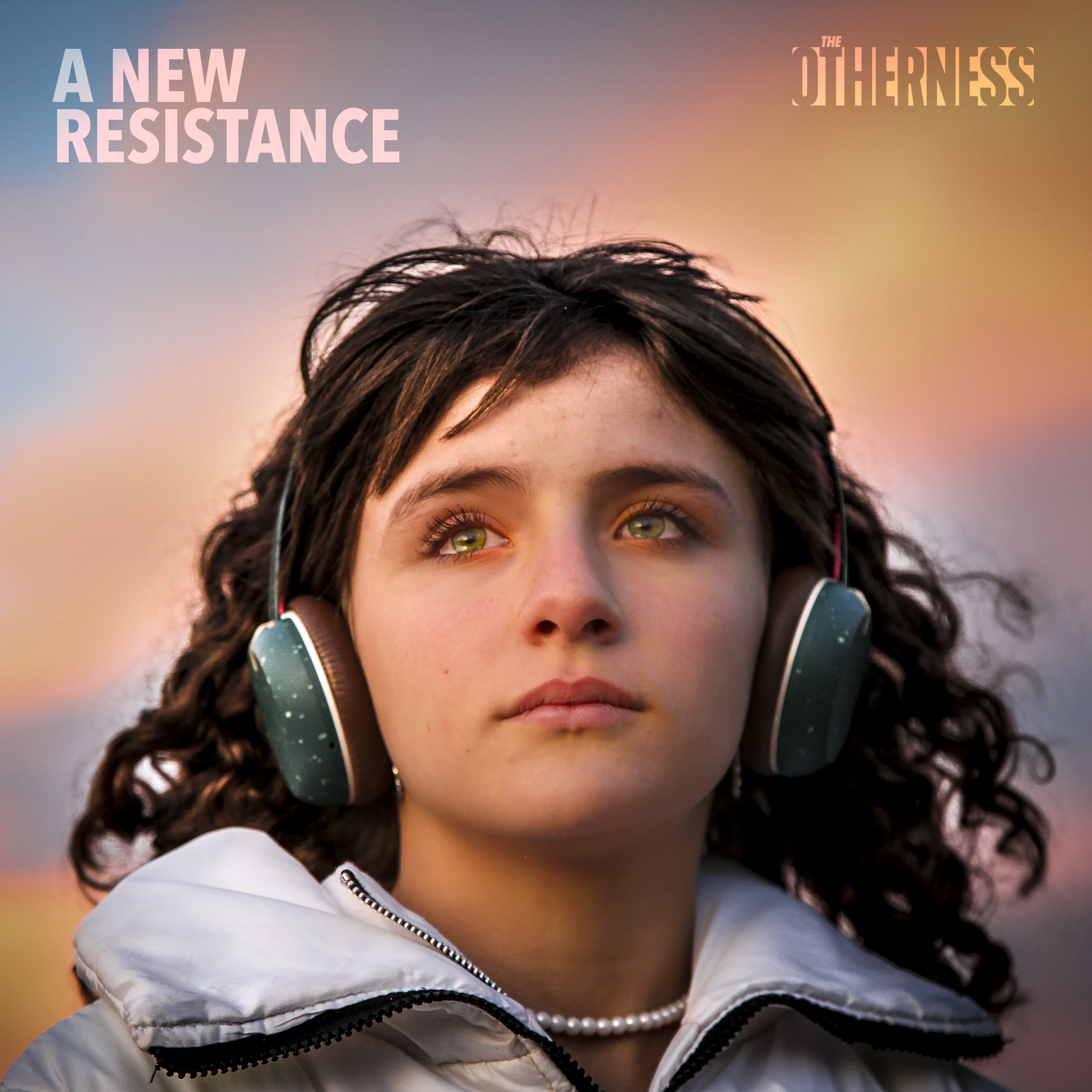
"A New Resistance" 4 track EP by The Otherness 2022.

In September 2022, the band presented their video for single A New Resistance at Berlin's Argentine Embassy. The video was produced by Panorámica Producciones with the support of Ente Comodoro Turismo, the tourism agency of Comodoro Rivadavia.

In October 2022, the band released a 4 track EP entitled "A New Resistance" and toured in Europe and the UK in the summer of 2023.

By the end of 2024 they recorded a new album entitled "Broken Latitudes" with songs written and arranged in Berlin and Buenos Aires, and due to be released in 2026. This collection of songs was again produced by Gaspar Benegas in Argentina and mastered by Felix Davis at Metropolis Studios in London.

During this period The Otherness was discovered and championed by DJ Rodney Bingenheimer and gained airplay on his radioshow for SiriusXM in Los Angeles.

== Musical style ==
The band describe their music as having an “uplifting, diverse, melodic and intense” tone. Their debut album LMIRL drew comparisons to The Beatles and Ramones, while they have also been compared to The Beach Boys, Little Richard, and described as reviving elements of “old school rock ‘n’ roll." The band have cited key influences as including Aretha Franklin, James Brown, Fats Domino, Sam Cooke, Lead Belly and The Clash.

== Band members ==
- Martin Cativa - guitar, lead vocals (2010–present)
- Gonzalo Cativa - bass, lead vocals (2010–present)
- Pablo Gaggioni - drums, backing vocals (2010–present)

== Discography ==
Albums

- LMIRL (2021)
- A New Resistance (2022)
