= Dolfini =

Dolfini is an Italian surname. Notable people with the surname include:

- Angelo Dolfini (born 1978), Italian figure skater
- Giovanni Dolfini (1885–1968), Italian actor

== See also ==
- Dolfin (disambiguation)
