= Dolphin F.C. =

Dolphin F.C. may refer to:

- Dolphin F.C. (Nigeria), defunct football club based in Port Hartcourt
- Dolphin F.C. (Ireland), defunct football club based in Dublin
- Dolphin RFC, an Irish rugby union club based in Cork

== See also ==
- Dolphins United F.C., a football club in the Philippines
- Frankston Football Club, nicknamed The Dolphins, an Australian rules football club
- Delfín S.C., an Ecuadorian football club
- Dolphin (disambiguation)
