= USS Dolphin =

USS Dolphin may refer to:

- USS Dolphin (1777), a cutter in commission during 1777
- USS Dolphin (1821), a schooner in commission from 1821 to 1835
- USS Dolphin (1836), a brig intermittently in and out of commission from 1836 to 1860
- USS Dolphin (PG-24), a gunboat and dispatch vessel intermittently in and out of commission from 1885 to 1921
- USS Dolphin (SP-318), a fishing vessel examined for potential naval use in 1917 but apparently never taken over by the Navy
- USS Dolphin (SP-874), a patrol vessel in commission during 1918
- USS Dolphin (SS-169), a submarine in commission from 1932 to 1945
- USS Dolphin (AGSS-555), a research and development submarine in commission from 1968 to 2007
