= Dolfijn =

Dolfijn (Dutch for dolphin) may refer to:

- HNLMS Dolfijn, the name of four Royal Netherlands Navy submarines
- Dolfijn-class submarine, a class of Royal Netherlands Navy submarines built in the late 1950s and the early 1960s
- De Dolfijn, a Dutch ship involved in the Kettle War of 1784

== See also ==
- Dolphin (disambiguation)
