= Ike Dike =

Proposed Galveston Bay, Texas storm surge protection project

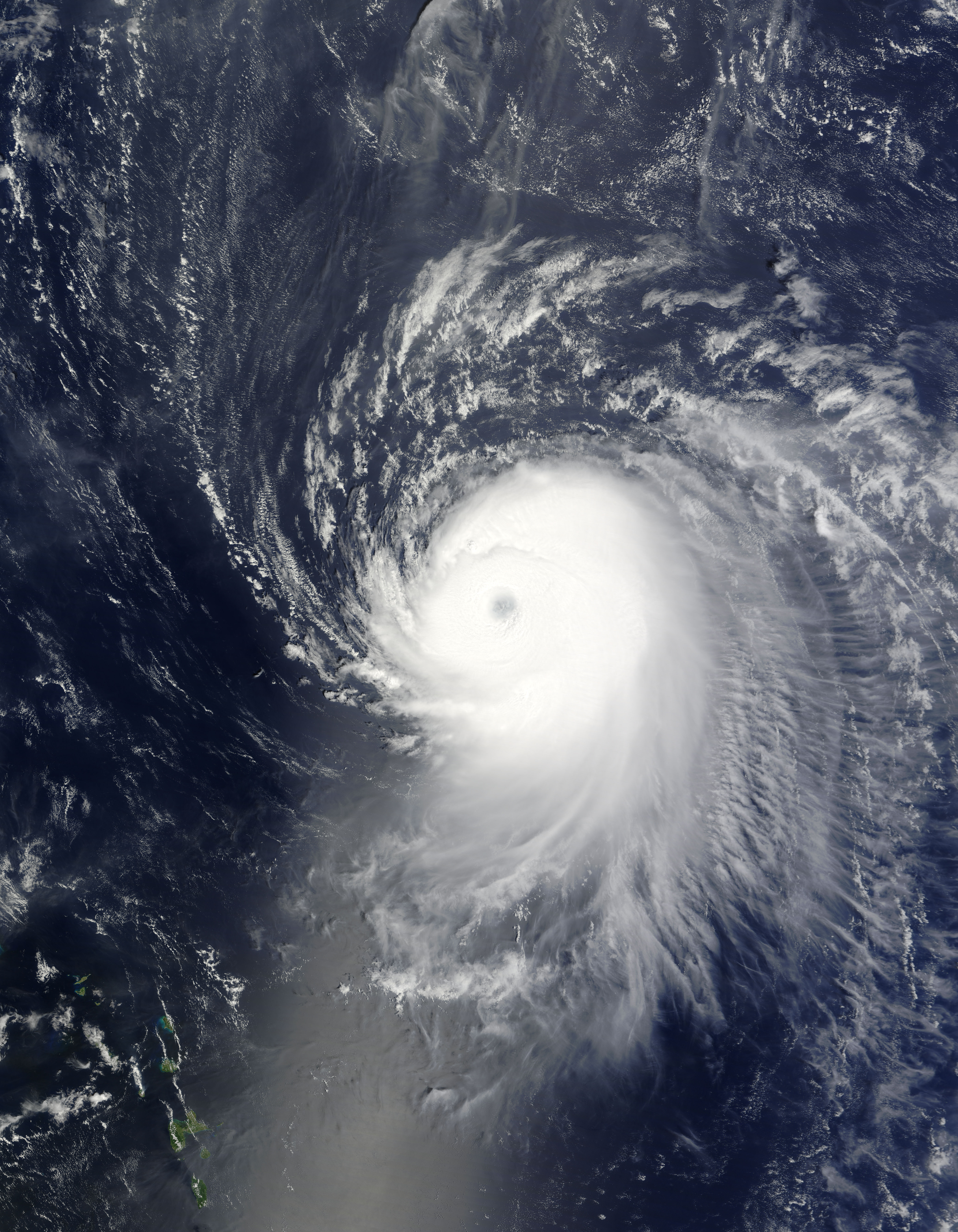
- Mission statement: "A coastal barrier protecting the Houston Galveston region from hurricane storm surge"
- Commercial?: No
- Type of project: Proposed government construction
- Location: Galveston Bay, Texas, United States
- Owner: Texas A&M University / State of Texas
- Founder: William J. Merrill
- Website: www.tamug.edu/ikedike/

The Ike Dike is a proposed coastal barrier that, when completed, would protect the Galveston Bay in Texas, United States. The project would be a dramatic enhancement of the existing Galveston Seawall, complete with floodgates, which would protect more of Galveston, the Bolivar Peninsula, the Galveston Bay Area, and Houston. The barrier would extend across Galveston Island and the Bolivar Peninsula and would provide a barrier against all Gulf surges into the bay. The project is primarily the suggestion of Dr. Bill Merrell of Texas A&M University at Galveston. The Ike Dike would be able to withstand a 10,000-year storm.

The proposal is, as the name suggests, motivated by the damage caused by Hurricane Ike in 2008 (as well as the disastrous 1900 Galveston Hurricane). Storm surges from Hurricane Ike caused severe damage to Galveston and the Bolivar Peninsula and caused significant damage to other areas around the bay. The damage to critical industries was minimal and most heavy industries returned to normal quickly. Still, Ike was not nearly as destructive as meteorologists predict a future hurricane will eventually be.

Proponents argue that there is a national security concern that must be addressed. The Houston area (particularly the Bay Area) is home to the largest and most important concentration of petroleum refining and petrochemical processing plants in the United States, and most of these plants are on the coast or on the ship channel. Additionally, the Port of Houston is the second-busiest port in the nation. The economic damage to the United States, not to mention Texas, in the event of a catastrophic impact on the coast would be nationally serious. Indeed, some researchers have argued that had Ike tracked a few miles further southwest it could have sidelined 40% of U.S. jet-fuel production, not to mention serious setbacks to the production of gasoline and other chemicals

Opponents of the project worry that it is simply too expensive--with escalating costs. Originally conceived as $2-$4 billion project, a fall 2021 estimated cost was $29 billion, and it was projected to cost a total of $34 billion; the 2023 Defense Authorization bill included $31 billon for the project. In 2017 the Sierra Club and other environmentalists warned about the risk to marine life in the area. Several groups were proving their own recommendations on the technical aspects and design of the storm-surge protection system.

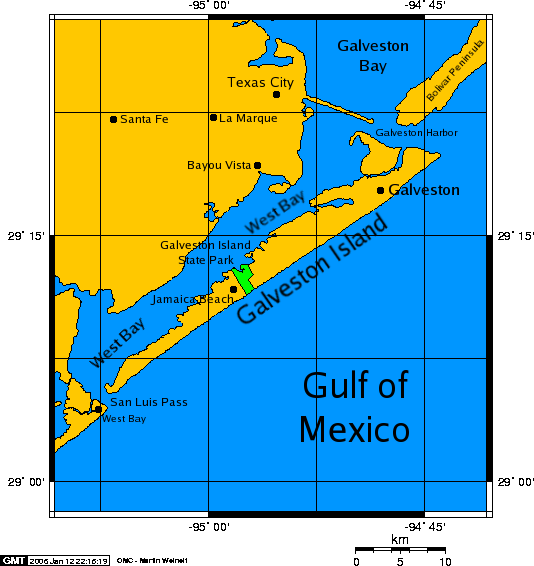
Map of Galveston Bay; Galveston Island is at center with Bolivar Peninsula to its northeast.

In 2010 the Texas Governor publicly expressed support for the idea. The Governor's Commission on Disaster Recovery and Renewal recommended that a 6-county (Harris, Galveston, Chambers, Brazoria, Orange and Jefferson) public corporation be established to examine regional approaches to storm surge suppression. That corporation, the Gulf Coast Community Protection and Recovery District, Inc., was established on April 20, 2010. Galveston County Judge Jim Yarborough was elected chair of the board of directors and Robert Eckels, former county judge of Harris County, was elected president. Dannenbaum Engineering was appointed as the engineering consultant. Despite this, though, the declining economy in 2010 stifled efforts to secure funding and the project remains stalled. By the end of 2012 momentum toward building the structure had waned significantly, in large part due to Hurricane Sandy, which seriously damaged the U.S. Northeast and attracted attention away from the Gulf Coast. Nevertheless, in 2013 Bay Area Houston Economic Partnership, a local community organization, began efforts to raise funds for a comprehensive study that could convince the U.S. Congress to fund the project. In addition, throughout 2013 researchers at Delft University of Technology worked out several flood defense concepts for closing off the Bolivar Roads Inlet. On Monday August 4, 2014, Texas legislators lamented a disagreement on how to protect the Houston region against storm surge and urged that a plan be brought to the Legislature as soon as possible.

The project manager named by Dannenbaum Engineering to study the Ike Dike and alternatives, Christopher W. Sallese, is a retired U.S. Army Corps of Engineer colonel. He was the district engineer and commanding officer of the Galveston District. Sallese is named as one of several defendants in an April 19, 2013, federal lawsuit filed in United States District Court, Southern District of Texas, Galveston Division, as Civil Action No. 3:13-CV-00126. This lawsuit is significant because the East Galveston Bay complex and neighboring counties would be changed greatly if the dike was constructed. Property owners and the economic base of the area would face tremendous changes. In addition, the Rollover Pass area is a federally protected critical habitat for endangered species and is a key point for marine species migration.

In 2018, the Army Corps of Engineers gave its approval to a dike plan estimated to cost between $23 and $31 billion. The proposal is similar to, but not identical to, Merrell's original proposal. Additional studies for the proposal are expected to be completed in 2021 at which time Congress would be expected to debate funding.

In May 2021, the Texas legislature approved the barrier proposal. As of August 2021, the plan had been submitted to the U.S. Congress for consideration to be funded as part of the infrastructure plans proposed by President Biden.

In the summer of 2022, the U.S. Congress approved the Water Resources and Development Act which would authorize the U.S. Army Corps of Engineers to begin planning the Ike Dike, though funding has not been secured.

In January 2023, the Defense budget authorized $31 billion (of a $34 billion project total project cost) for the Ike Dike. In June 2023, the Texas legislature authorized $550 million for the Ike Dike.
