= Delfinen =

Delfinen (Swedish for dolphins) may refer to:

- HSwMS Delfinen, various Swedish Navy ships
- Swedish Delfinen-class submarine, a Royal Swedish Navy class
- Danish Delfinen-class submarine, a Royal Danish Navy class
- HDMS Delfinen (S326), the lead ship of the class, launched in 1956
- Delfinen, a Swedish royal barge constructed in 1787; see List of oldest surviving ships
- Coop Norrbotten Arena, Luleå, Sweden, an indoor sporting arena originally named Delfinen
- Delfinen, the student newspaper of Aarhus University, Aarhus, Denmark
