= Dolphin Island =

Dolphin Island may refer to:

== Places ==
- Dolphin Island (Western Australia), Australia
- Dolphin Island (Nunavut), Canada
- Dolphin Island (Fiji)
- Dolphin Island, a popular name for Il Gallo Lungo, a dolphin-shaped island in the Italian archipelago of Sirenuse
- Dolphin Island (Jamaica), off Jamaica
- Dolphin Island, an outlying peak of the Hogup Mountains, Utah, U.S.
- Dolphin Island (Vanuatu)

== Other uses ==
- Dolphin Island (film), a 2021 family film
- Dolphin Island (novel), by Arthur C. Clarke, 1963
- Dolphin Island: Underwater Adventures, a 2009 video game
- Dolphin Island (Iruka Jima), Japan, a dolphinarium
- Dolphin Island, an attraction at Resorts World Sentosa, Singapore

== See also ==
- Dauphin Island, Alabama, a town in the U.S.
- Dolphin (disambiguation)
