= Galveston Seawall =

- U.S. National Register of Historic Places
- Texas State Antiquities Landmark
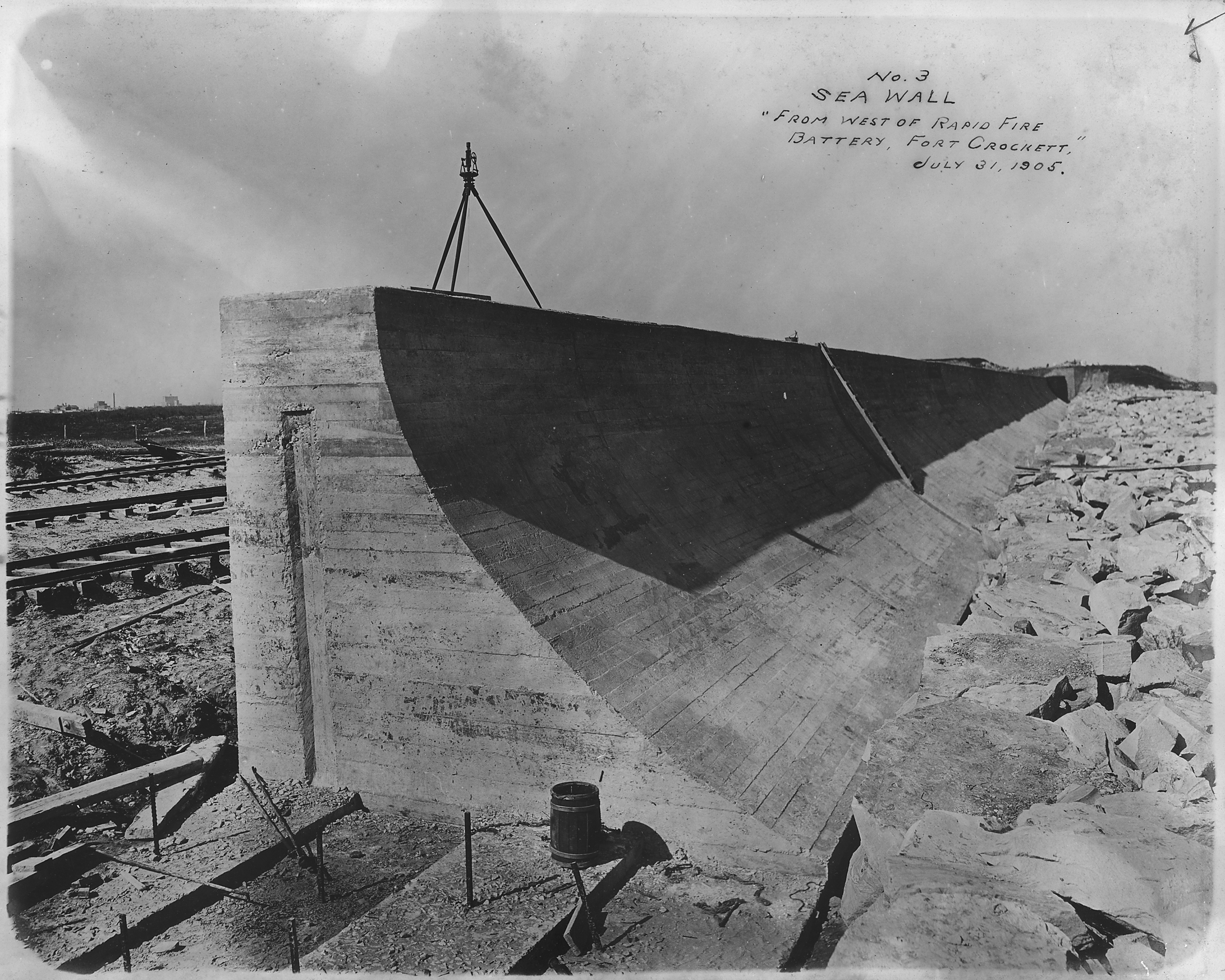
- Galveston Seawall during construction

- Location within Texas Location within the United States
- Location: Seawall Blvd., Galveston, Texas
- Coordinates: 29°18′09″N 94°46′27″W
- Area: 8 acres (3.2 ha)
- Built: 1902
- Built by: J.M. O`Rourke & Co.
- Architect: Gen. H.M. Robert
- Architectural style: Protective Seawall
- NRHP reference No.: 77001443
- TSAL No.: 8200000269

Significant dates
- Added to NRHP: August 18, 1977
- Designated TSAL: January 1, 1981

The Galveston Seawall is a seawall in Galveston, Texas, that was built after the 1900 Galveston hurricane for protection from future hurricanes. Construction began in September 1902, and the initial segment was completed on July 29, 1904. From 1904 to 1963, the seawall was extended from 3.3 miles (5.3 km) to over 10 miles (16 km).

== Description ==
Although the Seawall performed as intended, it created an unintended and insurmountable consequence: passive erosion resulting in the gradual disappearance of the once-wide beach and the resort business with it. "Within twenty years, the city had lost one hundred yards of sand. People who once watched auto racing on a wide beach were left with a narrow strip of sand at low tide and a gloomy vista of waves on rocks when the tide was high." Houston soon overtook Galveston as the major city in the region.

Reporting in the aftermath of the 1983 Hurricane Alicia, the Corps of Engineers estimated that $100 million in damage was avoided because of the seawall. On September 13, 2008, Hurricane Ike's large waves over-topped the seawall. As a result, a commission was established by the Texas governor to investigate preparing for and mitigating future disasters.

A proposal has been put forth to build an "Ike Dike", a massive levee system that would protect the Galveston Bay and the important industrial facilities that line the coast and the Houston Ship Channel from a future, potentially more destructive storm. The proposal has gained widespread support from a variety of business interests. However, this proposal never passed the conceptual stage. Since 2009 there have been many similar propositions brought forth for a more practical layered network to consist of smaller, local levees and natural protections have been put forward by the SSPEED Center at Rice University and the University of Houston. These proposals include a surge gate at the mouth of the Houston Ship Channel connecting adjacent high ground near the Fred Hartman Bridge and hard protections for the west shore of Galveston Bay and around the densely developed east end of Galveston Island. Also included is the proposed lower coastal Lone Star Coastal National Recreation Area.

Texas F.M. 3005 is known as Seawall Boulevard where it runs along the seawall. The sidewalk adjacent to Seawall Boulevard on top of the seawall is claimed to be the longest continuous sidewalk in the world at 10.3 miles (16.6 km) long.

The seawall is 10 miles (16 km) long. It is approximately 17 feet (5.2 m) high and 16 feet (4.9 m) thick at its base. The seawall was listed in the National Register of Historic Places in 1977 and designated a National Historic Civil Engineering Landmark by the American Society of Civil Engineers in 2001.

Many miles of the seawall are painted with murals. These huge murals are painted by children and depict underwater life.

== Gallery ==
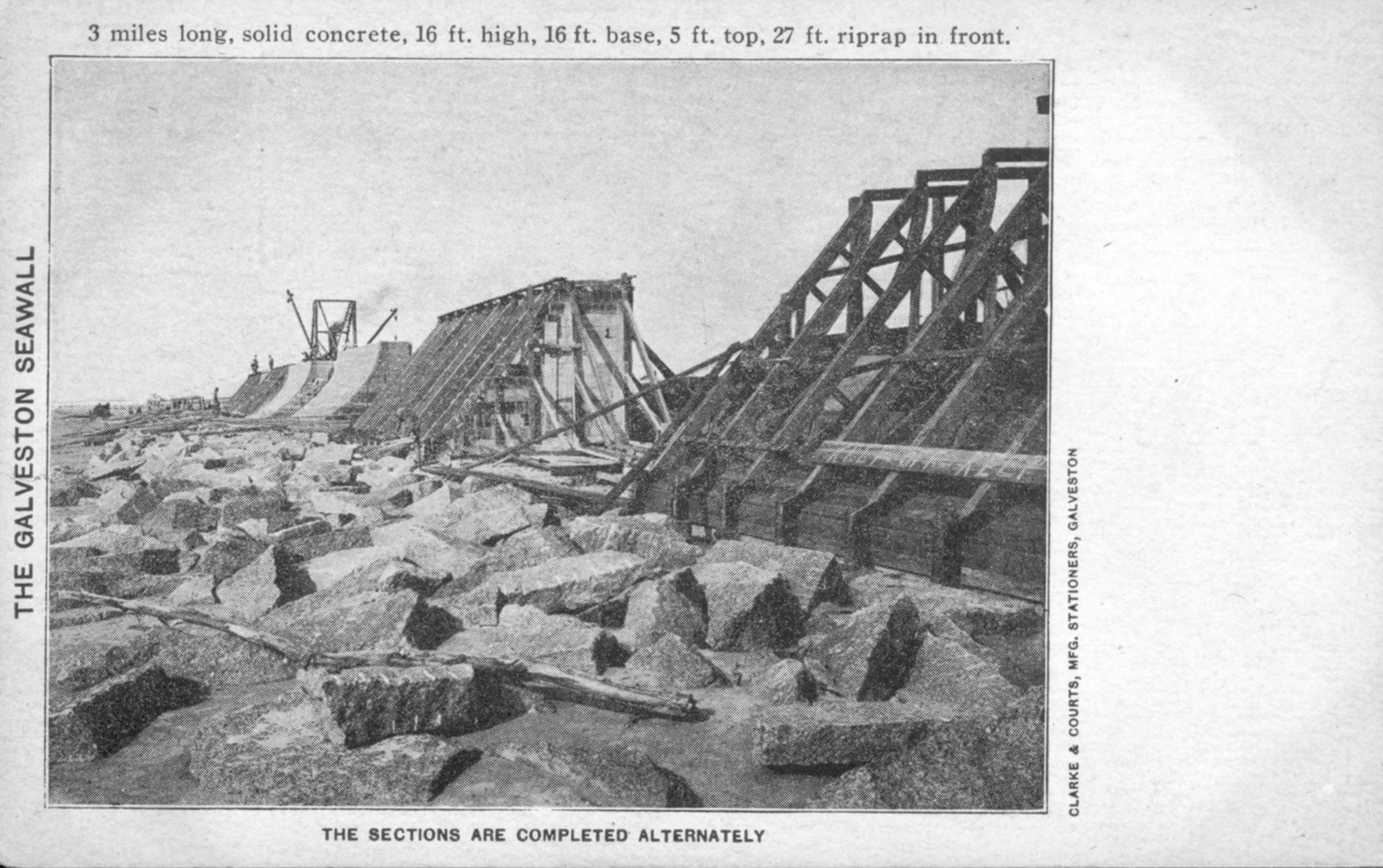
Postcard of the construction of the Galveston Seawall, undated.

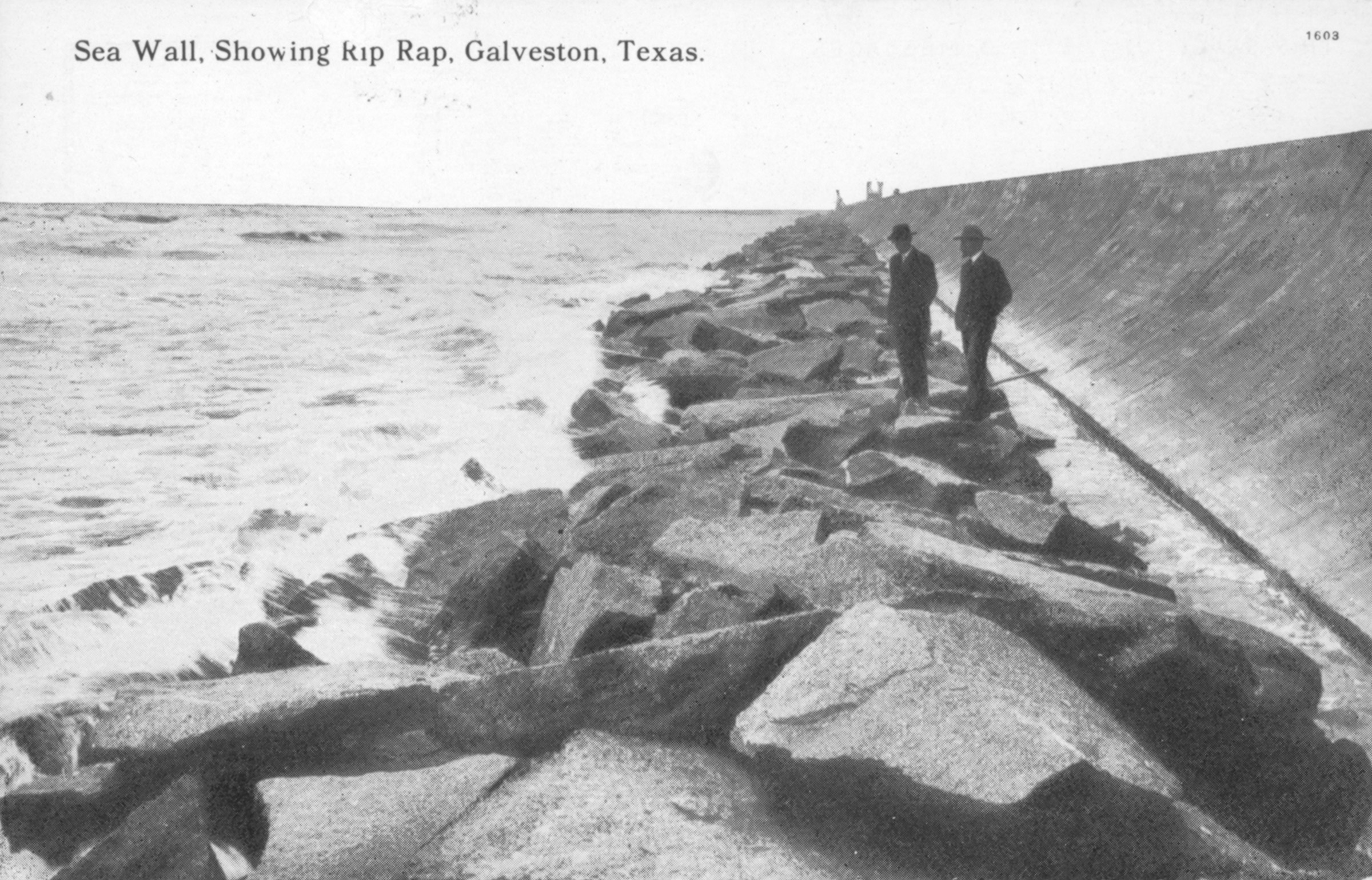
Postcard of the Galveston Seawall, undated.

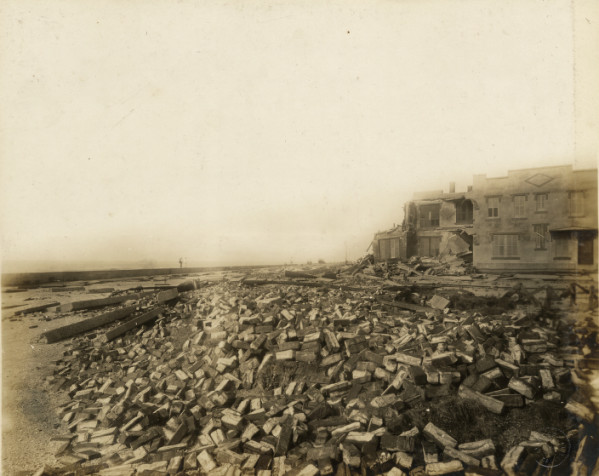
Damage to Seawall after 1915 Hurricane.

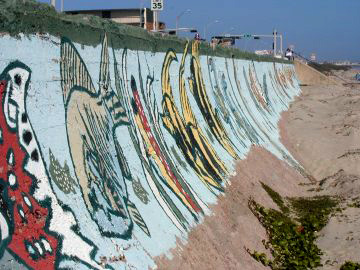
Galveston Seawall paintings.

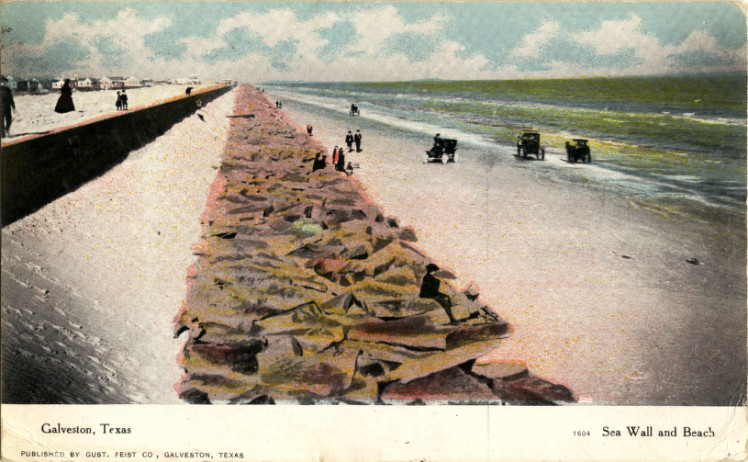
Sea Wall and beach, Galveston, Texas (postcard, circa 1907).

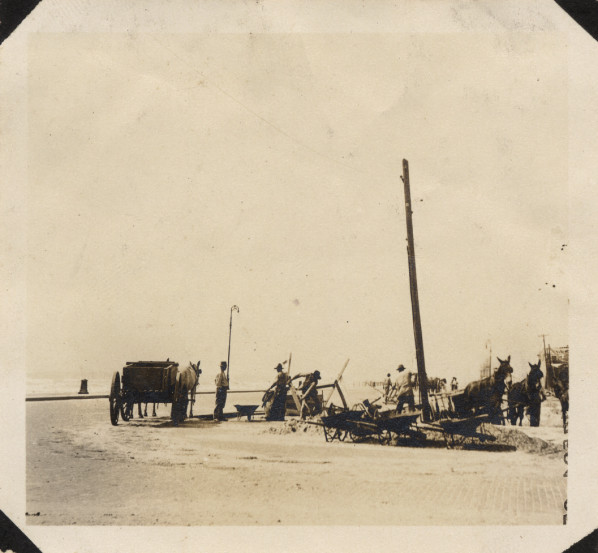
Workers repairing Seawall Boulevard after 1915 Galveston hurricane.

== See also ==
- 1900 Storm Memorial, installed along the Seawall
- The Dolphins (sculpture), installed along the Seawall
- National Register of Historic Places listings in Galveston County, Texas
