= Delfim (given name) =

Delfim is a male given name. Notable people with the name include:

- Delfim da Câmara (1834–1916), Brazilian portrait painter
- Delfim Carlos de Carvalho, Baron of Passagem (1825–1896), Brazilian naval officer who fought in the Paraguayan War
- Delfim Ferreira (1888–1960), an important Portuguese entrepreneur
- Delfim José da Silva, Portuguese rower
- Delfim Modesto Brandão (c. 1835–?), the penultimate head of state of the Couto Misto
- Delfim Moreira (1868–1920), Brazilian politician who served as the tenth president of Brazil
  - Delfim Moreira, Minas Gerais, a municipality in the state of Minas Gerais named after the above
- Delfim Moreira (runner), (born 1955), Portuguese long-distance runner
- Delfim Neves (born 1965), São Toméan politician
- Delfim Peixoto (1941–2016), Brazilian politician and football administrator
- Delfim Ribeiro Guedes (1908–1985), Brazilian bishop
- Delfim Santos (1907–1966), Portuguese academic, philosopher, educationist, essayist, and book and movie reviewer
- Delfim Teixeira (born 1977), Portuguese former footballer
