= 1900 Storm Memorial =

2000 artwork by David Moore in Galveston, Texas, U.S.

- The memorial in 2024
- Artist: David Moore
- Year: 2000
- Medium: Bronze sculpture
- Location: Galveston, Texas, U.S.
- 29°16′21.6″N 94°48′54.4″W

The 1900 Storm Memorial is a bronze sculpture by David Moore (1921–2001), installed along the Galveston Seawall in Galveston, Texas. It was installed in 2000 and commemorates victims of the 1900 Galveston hurricane.

== Description ==
The bronze sculpture is approximately ten feet tall.

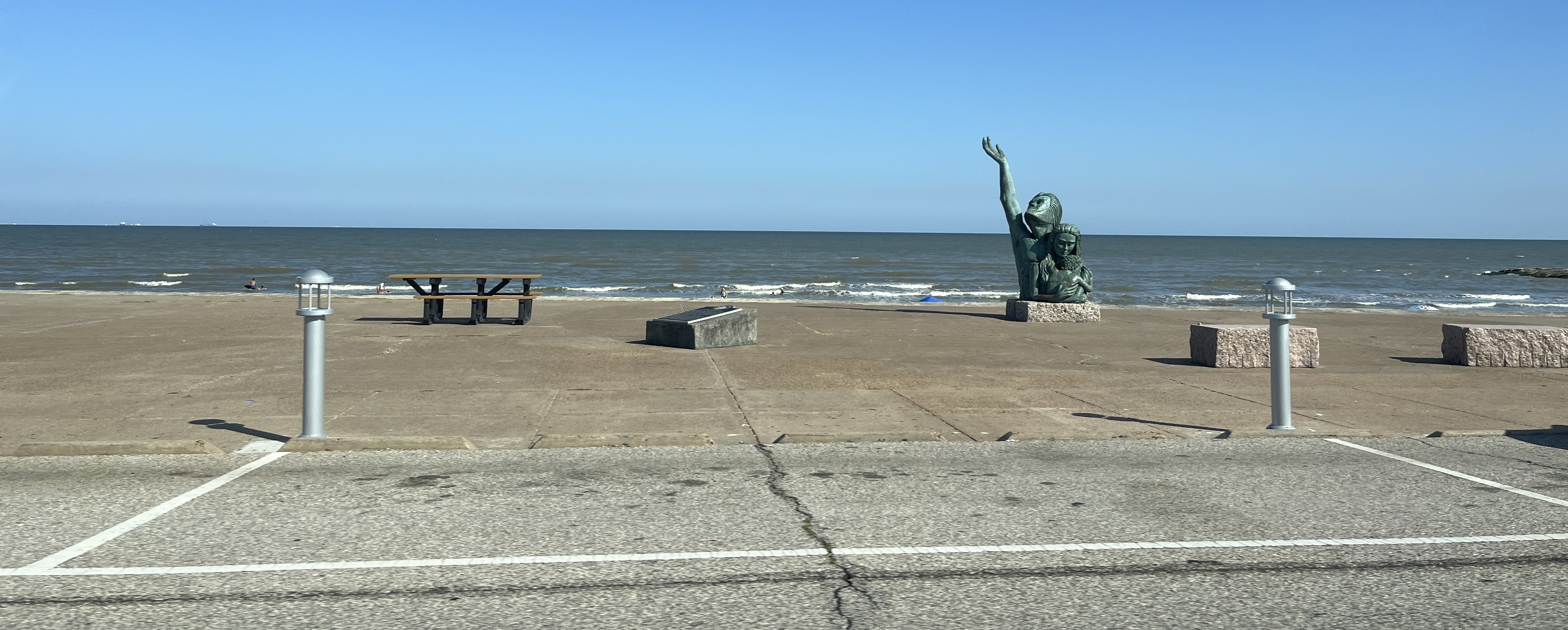

== See also ==
- 2000 in art
- The Dolphins (sculpture), also installed along the Seawall
