= Bust of Cardinal Giovanni Dolfin =

Sculpture by Gianlorenzo Bernini

Portrait of Giovanni Dolfin
- Artist: Gianlorenzo Bernini
- Year: 1621
- Type: Marble sculpture
- Location: Venice

The Bust of Cardinal Giovanni Dolfin or Delfin is a sculptural portrait by the Italian artist Gian Lorenzo Bernini, which is part of a mausoleum for the Venetian Cardinal Giovanni Delfin, member of one of Venice's most ancient noble families. The tomb as a whole was a joint work commissioned of Bernini and his father Pietro. While Gianlorenzo executed the portrait bust, Pietro carried out the surrounding figures, including two allegorical figures of Faith and Hope as well as the Delfin family coat of arms. The work was completed in late 1621, and sits in the church of San Michele in Isola.

== See also ==
- List of works by Gian Lorenzo Bernini
