= Palazzo Dolfin Manin =

Coordinates: 45.4371°N 12.3356°E

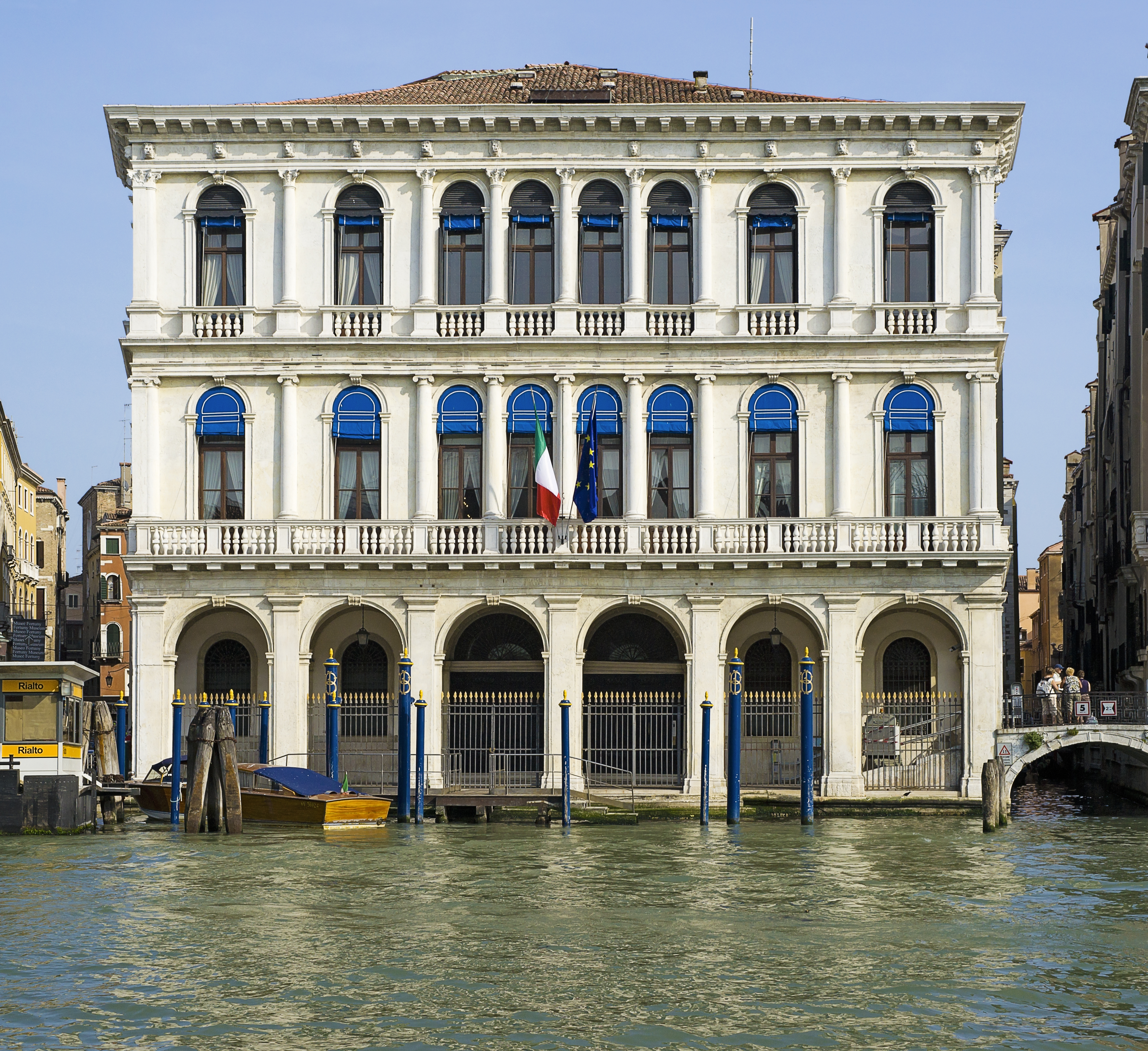
Palazzo Dolfin Manin

Palazzo Dolfin Manin is a palace in the sestiere of San Marco on the Canal Grande of Venice, northern Italy. It is located near the Palazzo Bembo and Palazzo Dandolo Paolucci, not far from the Rialto Bridge.

== History ==
The palace was built by the noble Dolfin family starting from 1536, in order to renovate their previous residence, formed by two separate medieval edifices. The construction cost some 30,000 ducats, and was designed by Jacopo Sansovino.

A renovation program was carried on under the last Venetian doge, Ludovico Manin, who commissioned the works to Giannantonio Selva. Ludovico Manin spent here in segregation his last years, after signing the Treaty of Campoformio which ended the Republic of Venice.

His family held the palace until 1867, when it was acquired by the National Bank of the Kingdom of Italy: the latter's successor, the Banca d'Italia, has currently its Venetian seat here. The palace underwent several restorations in 1968-1971 and again in 2002.

== Description ==
The façade was realized in 1538-1547 by Jacopo Sansovino, who had also designed the Palazzo Corner on the Canal Grande. It is in white Istrian stone and has wide round arcades.

The lower floor has six arcades supported by seven pillars, in correspondence of which are the Ionian and Corinthian semicolumns of the upper floors. These have the same number of windows at the sides, while at the center are two quadruple mullioned windows.

The interior houses works by Giovan Battista Tiepolo, who executed them in 1725-1730 or in the 1740s, to celebrate the marriage between Ludovico Manin and Elisabetta Grimani (1748). The palace is completed by an internal courtyard, from which a large staircase leads to the upper floors.

== Sources ==
- Brusegan, Marcello (2005). I palazzi di Venezia. Rome: Newton Compton. ISBN 88-541-0820-0.
