= Delfino =

Delfino (It: "Dolphin") can refer to:

- Delfino (name), which can be both a surname and a given name
- Italian submarine Delfino (1890)
- Italian submarine Delfino (1930)
- Delfino Pescara 1936, an Italian football team
- Delfino (car company), manufacturer of the Delfino Feroce
- Alfa Romeo Delfino, or simply Delfino, a 1983 concept car
- Isle Delfino, a fictional island in Super Mario Sunshine
