= Delfim (surname) =

Delfim is a Portuguese surname. Notable people with the surname include:

- Antônio Delfim Netto (1928–2024), Brazilian economist, academic, and politician
- Francisco Delfim Dias Faria (1949–2004), Portuguese footballer
- Gabriel Delfim (born 2002), Brazilian footballer
- Horácio Delfim Dias de Faria (born 1947), Portuguese former footballer
- José Delfim (1907–?), Portuguese footballer
- Tiago Abiola Delfim Almeida Ilori (born 1993), Portuguese professional footballer
