= HSwMS Delfinen =

Five warships of Sweden have been named Delfinen (Swedish for dolphins):

- HSwMS Delfinen (1626), a warship launched in 1626.
- HSwMS Delfinen (1713), a galley launched in 1713.
- HSwMS Delfinen (1914), a submarine launched in 1914 and stricken 1930.
- HSwMS Delfinen (1934), a Delfinen class submarine launched in 1934 and stricken in 1957.
- HSwMS Delfinen (1961), a Draken II-class submarine launched in 1961 and stricken in 1993.
