= Dolfin Dolfin =

Dolfin Dolfin or Delfino Delfin, was a Venetian nobleman who served during the Fall of Constantinople in 1453.

== Origin and career ==
Dolfin Dolfin, was born into the powerful Dolfin family of Venice, one of the oldest and most recognized noble families of the Serenissima. From a young age, he followed the "cursus honorum" of young Venetian noblemen, training in the army, the naval fleet, the law, and affairs of State.

When the time came, Dolfin began to serve the Venetian navy, which had the most powerful fleet of its day. His family had a long tradition in the Navy, reaching special notoriety when Giovanni Dolfin broke the Hungarian siege of Treviso in order to be crowned as Doge in 1356.

In the 15th century, Venice controlled most of the Mediterranean, and had important interests in the rump Byzantine Empire. Therefore, when the Ottomans began their siege of the Byzantine capital, Constantinople, the Venetian fleet was immediately involved in its defence. During the siege, Dolfin was commanded to defend the north gate of the city walls, which he managed with great success. When Giacomo Coco, admiral of the Christian fleet died while trying to burn the Turkish fleet, Dolfin was put in charge of it. Dolfin Dolfin survived the fall of the city.
