= Delfín Mosibe =

Equatoguinean footballer (born 1992)

Personal information
- Full name: Delfín Mosibe Esara
- Date of birth: 2 July 1992 (age 34)
- Place of birth: Luba, Equatorial Guinea
- Height: 1.75 m (5 ft 9 in)
- Position: Midfielder

Team information
- Current team: Hampton East Brighton FC
- Number: 7

Youth career
- 2000–2003: Juventud URJC
- 2003–2010: Real Madrid
- 2010: Real Valladolid

Senior career*
Years	Team	Apps	(Gls)
2012	Betis San Isidro	12	(1)
2012	Atlético Ibañés	6	(0)
2013	Werribee City	22	(0)
2014	Sunshine George	12	(5)
2015	Altona Magic	7	(0)
2016	Werribee City	13	(6)
2016	Hume City	4	(3)
2017	Springvale White Eagles	13	(3)
2017	Casey Comets	13	(0)
2018	Doveton SC	17	(4)
2018	Casey Comets	4	(1)
2023	Skye United FC	7	(1)
2024-	Hampton East Brighton FC	36	(7)

International career
2010	Equatorial Guinea U-20	1	(0)
2009	Equatorial Guinea	1	(0)
- * Club domestic league appearances and goals as of 19 August 2023

Delfín Mosibe Esara (born 2 July 1992), also known as Delfi, is an Equatoguinean footballer who plays for Hampton East Brighton FC in State League 1 South-East. Mainly an attacking midfielder, he also operates as a second striker and left winger. He capped for the Equatorial Guinea national team.

== Early life ==
Mosibe was born in Ruiche, a neighbourhood located in Luba, Bioko Sur to a Bubi family. He was just two years when his mother left the country for the Spanish Community of Madrid.

== Club career ==
After playing in the youth teams of Real Madrid (Juvenils C & B) and Real Valladolid (Juvenil A), in 2011, Mosibe went to Italy, where he has disputed friendly matches with Gubbio and Voluntas Spoleto, but, because of problems with the international transfer he could not sign with any team, opting to return to Spain the following year. Back in Spain, he played league matches, both Betis San Isidro and Atlético Ibañés. In 2013, he has signed for Werribee City, becoming the first ever Equatoguinean footballer who plays in an Australian club. In 2017, he joined the Springvale White Eagles. In 2024 Delfin joined Hampton East Brighton FC as a key signing for their SL2 SE campaign. Delfin played an important role in the club being promoted to State League One for the first time in 2025.

== International career ==
Mosibe was called for play with the Equatorial Guinea national team a friendly match against Estonia on 6 June 2009. The match marked his international debut and saw him come on before the start of the second half.
