= USS Dolphin (PG-24) =

Gunboat of the United States Navy

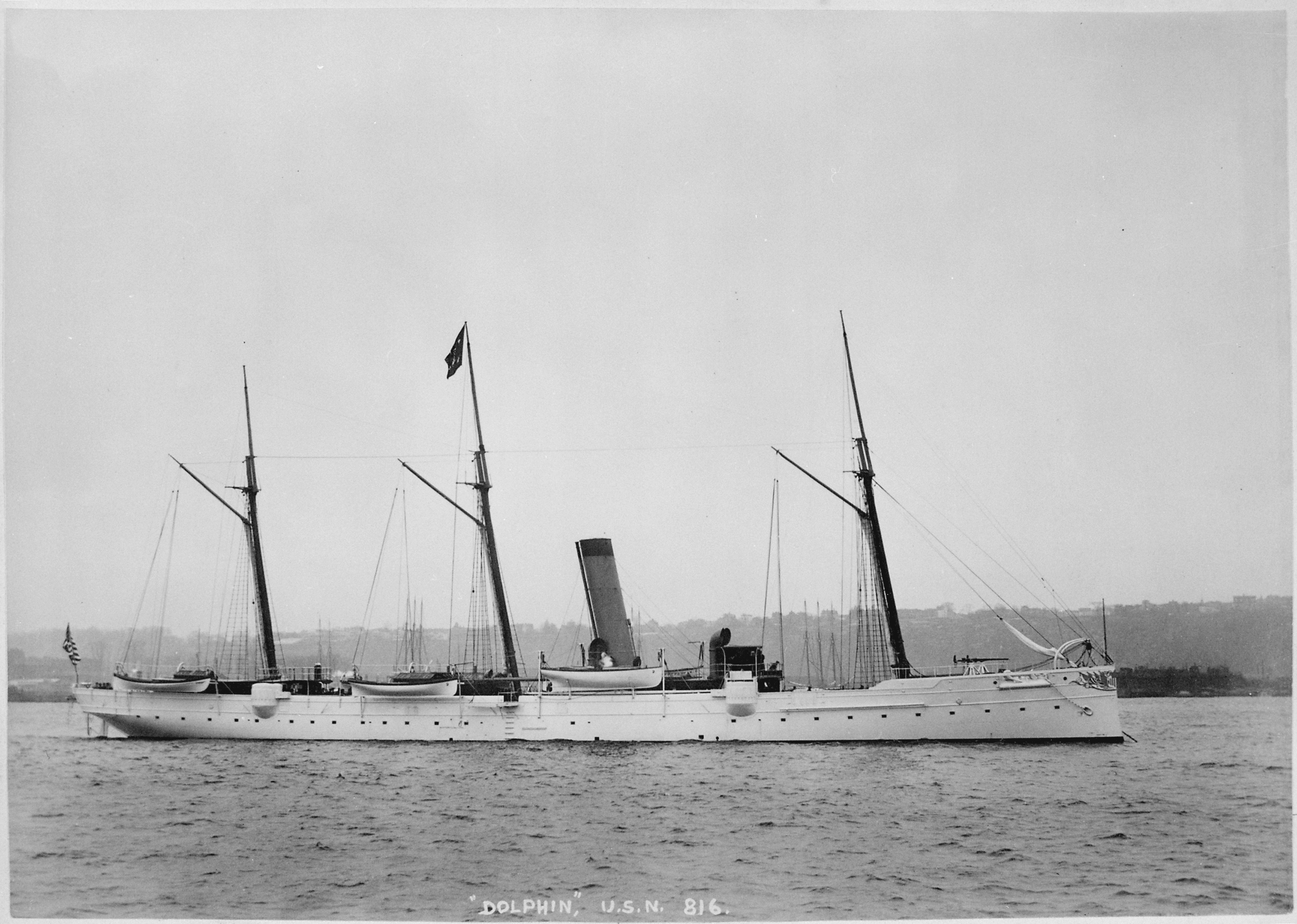
- Dolphin in 1891

History

United States
- Name: Dolphin
- Namesake: Dolphin
- Builder: Delaware River S&E, Chester
- Launched: 12 April 1884
- Commissioned: 8 December 1885
- Decommissioned: 1 May 1891
- Recommissioned: 14 March 1892
- Decommissioned: 23 November 1897
- Recommissioned: 24 March 1898
- Decommissioned: 8 December 1921
- Fate: Sold to Mexico, 25 February 1922

History

Mexico
- Name: Plan de Guadalupe
- Namesake: The Plan of Guadalupe
- Acquired: 25 February 1922
- Stricken: 1924
- Fate: Sold for scrap circa 1927

General characteristics
- Type: Gunboat / dispatch vessel
- Displacement: 1,485 long tons (1,509 t)
- Length: 256 ft 6 in (78.18 m)
- Beam: 32 ft (9.8 m)
- Draft: 14 ft 3 in (4.34 m)
- Installed power: 4 × cylindrical boilers; 1 × vertical compound engine, 2,255 ihp (1,682 kW)
- Propulsion: Sails (as built); 1 × shaft
- Speed: 16 kn (30 km/h; 18 mph)
- Complement: 152 officers and men
- Armament: As built: 1 × 6-inch (152 mm)/30 caliber Mark 1 gun; 2 × 6-pounder (57 mm (2.24 in)) guns; 4 × 3-pounder (47 mm (1.85 in)) Hotchkiss revolving cannon
- Notes: One of the U.S. Navy's first four steel ships

USS Dolphin (PG-24) was a gunboat/dispatch vessel; the fourth ship of the United States Navy to share the name. Dolphin was the first U.S. Navy ship to fly the flag of the president of the United States during President Chester A. Arthur's administration, and the second Navy ship to serve as a presidential yacht.

== Design and construction ==
Dolphin's keel was laid down by Delaware River Iron Ship Building and Engine Works of Chester, Pennsylvania. She was launched on 12 April 1884, with Captain George Dewey in command, and commissioned on 8 December 1885 with Captain R. W. Meade in command.

Dolphin was originally built as a dispatch vessel, intended to courier messages, as radio had not yet been invented. She was the only U.S. Navy vessel ever specifically designated as such. She was also called an "unarmored" or "unprotected" cruiser, and was eventually designated as a patrol gunboat (PG-24) on 1 July 1921, a few months before she was sold to Mexico. She was ordered as part of the "ABCD" ships, along with the cruisers Atlanta, Boston, and Chicago. These were the first ships of what came to be called the "New Navy", representing the transition from wooden-hulled to steel-hulled warships. Like the other three, Dolphin was built with a sail rig (later removed) to increase the ship's cruising range due to the inefficient steam engines of the day. All were ordered from the same shipyard, John Roach & Sons of Chester, Pennsylvania. However, when Secretary of the Navy William C. Whitney initially refused to accept Dolphin, claiming her design was defective, the Roach yard went bankrupt and the remaining three ships were completed in navy yards that had little experience with steel-hulled ships. Built for speed at the expense of protection, Dolphin was unarmored and her engine was unprotected as it extended above the waterline.

She was built with one 6-inch (152 mm)/30 caliber Mark 1 gun, two 6-pounder (57 mm (2.24 in)) rapid-fire guns, and four 3-pounder (47 mm (1.85 in)) Hotchkiss revolving cannon.

Dolphin was powered by four coal-fired cylindrical boilers and one 1 vertical compound engine producing 2,255 ihp (1,682 kW) for a speed of 16 kn (30 km/h; 18 mph).

=== Refits ===
References vary as to Dolphin's armament in a given period. In 1891, the 6-inch gun was replaced by two 4-inch (102 mm)/40 caliber guns. In 1913 her armament was replaced with six 6-pounders, augmented by two 3-inch (76 mm)/50 caliber guns in 1918. By 1921 her armament was one 4-inch (102 mm)/50 caliber gun and two 6-pounders.

== Service history ==
=== Before Spanish–American War ===
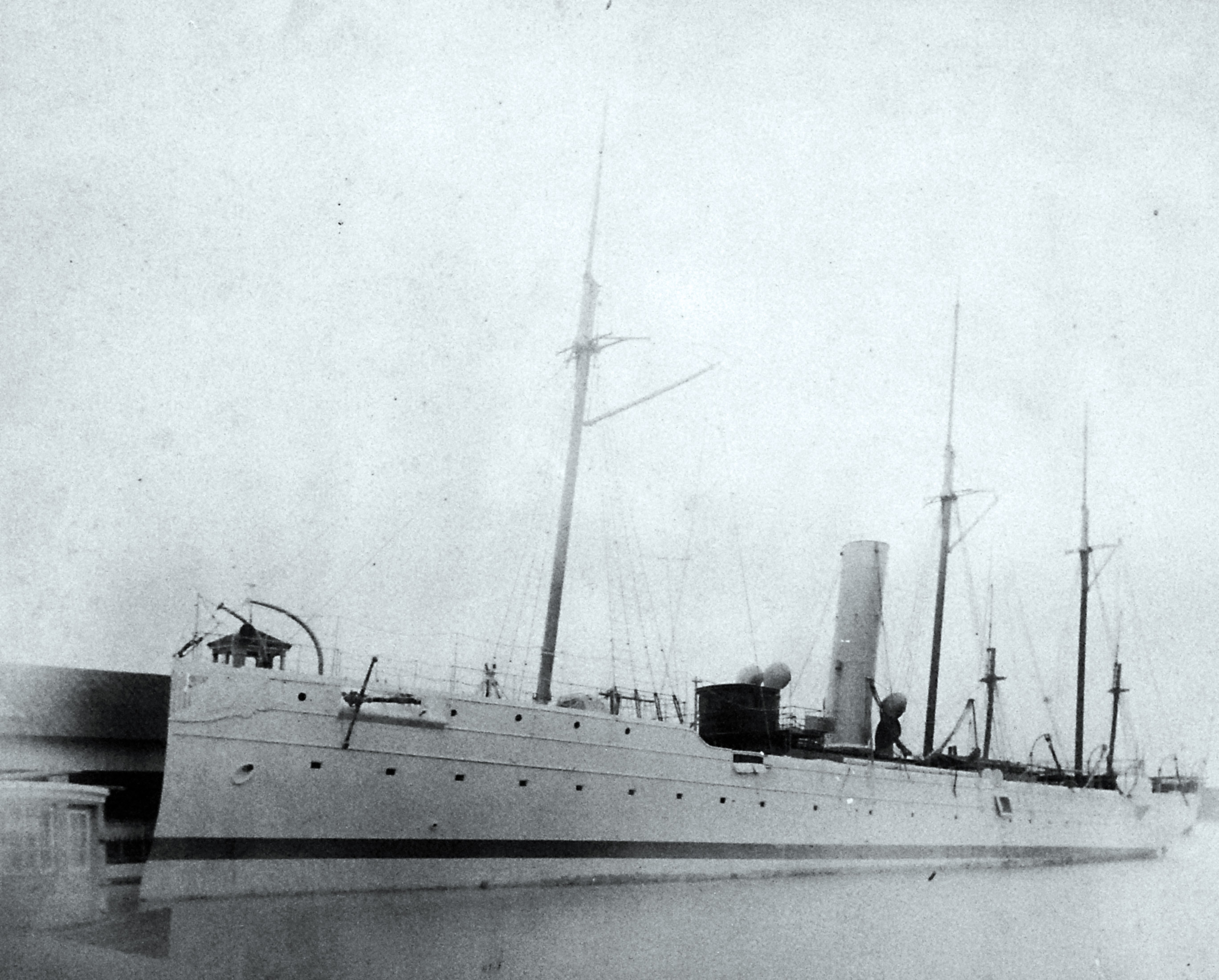
Dolphin at Norfolk Navy Yard in Portsmouth Virginia, 5 February 1892

The first of the vessels of the "New Navy" to be completed, Dolphin was assigned to the North Atlantic Station, cruising along the eastern seaboard until February 1886. She then sailed around South America on her way to the Pacific Squadron for duty.

She visited ports in Japan, Korea, China, Ceylon, India, Arabia, Egypt, Italy, Spain, and England, and the islands of Madeira and Bermuda, before arriving at New York City on 27 September 1889 to complete her round-the-world cruise.

She returned to duty on the North Atlantic Station, cruising in the West Indies from 9 December 1889 to 12 June 1890. On 23 December 1890, she was reassigned to the Squadron of Evolution and sailed from New York City on 7 January 1891 for a Caribbean cruise, returning to Norfolk, Virginia, on 7 April 1891.

Out of commission from 1 May 1891 to 14 March 1892, Dolphin then resumed her cruising along the United States East Coast, often carrying the United States Secretary of the Navy. In April 1893, President Grover Cleveland conducted New York's inaugural International Naval Review from the deck of the Dolphin. On 3 December 1895, she was assigned to the Special Service Squadron and made a surveying expedition to Guatemala in January–February 1896. She carried President William McKinley and his party during the naval review following the ceremonies dedicating Grant's Tomb in New York City on 27 April 1897. Dolphin was placed out of commission at New York on 23 November 1897.

=== Spanish–American War ===
Dolphin was recommissioned on 24 March 1898, just prior to the outbreak of the Spanish–American War, and served on blockade duty off Havana, Cuba in April–May. On 6 June, she came under fire from the Morro Battery at Santiago. On 14 June, she provided fire support for elements of the 1st Marine Battalion at the Battle of Cuzco Well in Guantanamo Bay, Cuba resulting in a total rout of the Spanish forces. Later that month, she sailed for Norfolk, arriving on 2 July.

=== Before World War I ===
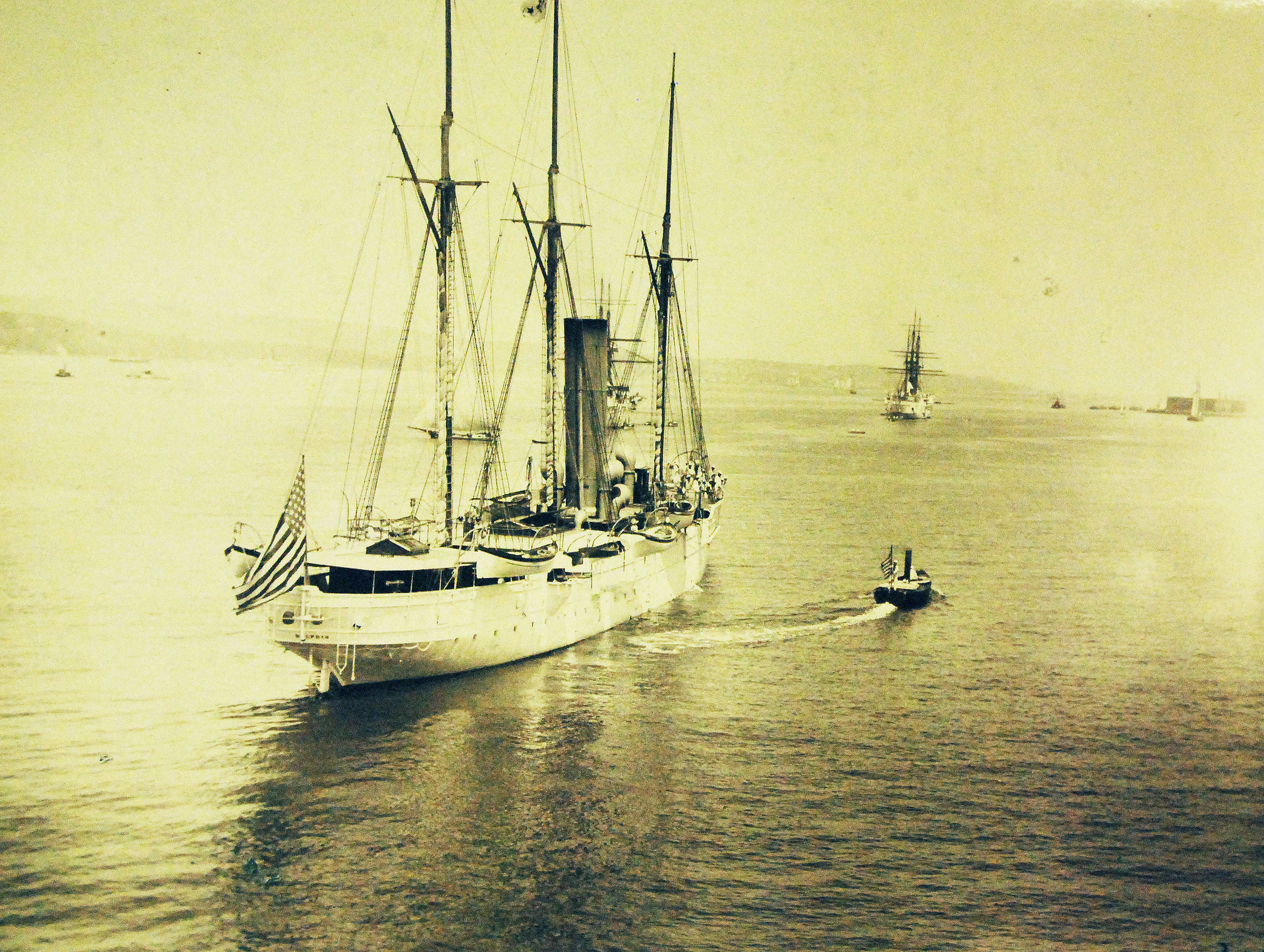
Dolphin while serving as a dispatch ship

From 1899 until the outbreak of World War I in Europe, Dolphin served as a special dispatch ship for the Secretary of the Navy and often carried the President of the United States and other important officials and diplomats. She visited Washington Navy Yard for the Peace Jubilee of 14 May – 30 June 1899; New York City for the George Dewey celebration of 26–29 September; and Alexandria, Virginia, for the city's sesquicentennial on 10 October. From 7 November 1899 – 2 February 1900, she cruised to Venezuela to survey the mouth of the Orinoco River. On 27–28 May 1900, Dolphin anchored off the coast of Norfolk, Virginia, with President William McKinley on board to observe a total solar eclipse. She departed Washington, D.C., on 11 January 1902 to survey the southeast coast of Santo Domingo, then carried the Chief of the Bureau of Equipment from Havana for a tour of inspection of the coaling stations in the West Indies. She returned to Washington on 6 May.

Dolphin sailed from Norfolk on 2 December 1902 to carry mail and dispatches to Culebra Island, Puerto Rico, then took the U.S. Minister to Venezuela to La Guaira, arriving on 11 January 1903. She continued to cruise in the West Indies until returning to Washington, D.C., on 19 April. From 1903 to 1905, she carried such dignitaries as the Naval Committee, Secretary of the Navy, Admiral and Mrs. George Dewey, the Philippine Commissioners, the Attorney General, Prince Louis of Battenberg and his party, and President Theodore Roosevelt on various cruises. In January 1904, she carried the remains of James Smithson, which had arrived in New York City from Genoa, Italy, for re-interment in the Smithsonian Institution in Washington, D.C. Early in August 1905, she carried the Japanese peace plenipotentiaries from Oyster Bay, New York, to Portsmouth, New Hampshire, to negotiate the settlement of the Russo-Japanese War. In 1907, the first live singing performed over radio, by Eugenia Farrar from Lee de Forest's laboratory atop the Parker Building, was received by the Dolphin's wireless operator, Oliver A. Wyckoff, while docked at Brooklyn Navy Yard.

She continued on primarily ceremonial duty, participating in the interment of John Paul Jones at the United States Naval Academy, and the departure ceremonies for the Great White Fleet until 22 October 1908, when she became flagship of the Third Squadron, Atlantic Fleet.

When Franklin D. Roosevelt became Assistant Secretary of the Navy in 1913, he occasionally used Dolphin to transport himself and his family. During his time on Dolphin FDR forged lifelong friendships with future Fleet Admiral William D. Leahy and Richard E. Byrd, both of whom served aboard. Dolphin was Byrd's third assignment after graduating from the Naval Academy. He served on Dolphin until he was medically retired in 1916 for a foot injury he sustained on board Dolphin.

==== Tampico, Veracruz, and Santo Domingo ====
In the spring of 1914 the Third Squadron – with Dolphin as flagship – sailed into Tampico to protect American lives and property. When some sailors from Dolphin were arrested by the Mexican government on 9 April 1914, the Tampico Affair took place, which later resulted in the United States occupation of Veracruz. On 23 November 1914, after seven months, the United States withdrew its armed forces. Subsequently, Dolphin assisted in the occupation of Santo Domingo from 12 to 22 May 1916. Her career as flagship continued until 1917.

=== World War I ===
In March 1917 President Woodrow Wilson started arming US merchant ships in response to attacks by the Central Powers. First to be armed was the cargo ship Aztec, on which two 5-inch guns were installed. A lieutenant and 11 ratings were detached from Dolphin at Washington Navy Yard and transferred to crew Aztec's guns.

Sailing from Washington, D.C., on 2 April 1917 to take possession of the recently purchased United States Virgin Islands, Dolphin received word four days later that war had been declared between the U.S. and Germany.

The next day, she arrived at St. Thomas and the squadron commander assumed office as Governor of the Virgin Islands on 9 April. Dolphin carried the Governor and his staff to the islands of Saint Croix and St. John to hoist the American flag with proper ceremony. On 26 April, she began a search for the steamer Nordskar, flying Danish colors, but suspected of aiding enemy operations. She found her at St. Lucia on 5 May and since her registry showed irregularities, Dolphin kept her in custody until departing for Key West, Florida on 28 June, when she turned her charge over to British authorities. Dolphin continued to patrol in the Caribbean Sea until arriving at Washington on 6 September.

Assigned as flagship for the American Patrol Detachment on 17 September 1917, Dolphin was based at Key West, and operated in the Gulf of Mexico and the Caribbean Sea to protect merchant shipping until the end of the war.

During World War I, this Dolphin was one of three U.S. Navy vessels in commission or considered for service of this name, and should not be confused with Dolphin (SP-318), a fishing vessel the U.S. Navy considered for service as a patrol vessel in 1917 but apparently never acquired from her owners, or with Dolphin (SP-874), a patrol vessel in commission during 1918.

=== After World War I ===
Dolphin remained in the Caribbean until her departure for New York City on 25 June 1920. After an overhaul at Boston, Massachusetts, she sailed on 16 October as flagship of the Special Service Squadron and joined the gunboat Des Moines in representing the United States at the celebration of the 400th anniversary of the discovery of the Straits of Magellan. Dolphin returned to Balboa in the Panama Canal Zone, and was based there for target practice, for hydrographic experiments, and to obtain political information, visiting various neighboring countries to promote friendly relations. On 16 September 1921, she was at Puerto Barrios, Guatemala, to attend the observance of the anniversary of Guatemalan independence.

Dolphin arrived at the Boston Navy Yard on 14 October 1921. She was decommissioned on 8 December 1921, after 36 years of service, and sold to Mexico on 25 February 1922. She served in Mexico with the name Plan de Guadalupe until stricken in 1924. She was scrapped circa 1927.

== Awards ==
- Sampson Medal
- Spanish Campaign Medal
- Haitian Campaign Medal
- Dominican Campaign Medal
- Mexican Service Medal
- World War I Victory Medal with "PATROL" clasp

== Bibliography ==
- Bauer, K. Jack; Roberts, Stephen S. (1991). Register of Ships of the U.S. Navy, 1775–1990: Major Combatants. Westport, Connecticut: Greenwood Press. ISBN 0-313-26202-0.
- Friedman, Norman (1984). U.S. Cruisers: An Illustrated Design History. Annapolis, Maryland: United States Naval Institute. ISBN 0-87021-718-6.
- Gardiner, Robert; Chesneau, Roger (1979). Conway's All the World's Fighting Ships 1860–1905. New York: Mayflower Books. ISBN 0-8317-0302-4.
- Gardiner, Robert; Gray, Randal (1985). Conway's All the World's Fighting Ships 1906-1921. London: Conway Maritime Press. ISBN 0-85177-245-5.
- The White Squadron. Toledo, Ohio: Woolson Spice Co., 1891. OCLC 45112425
- The White Squadron: Armed Cruisers, U.S.N. New York: International Art Publ. Co, 1800. OCLC 271460419
- The White Squadron of the U S Navy. New York: James Clarke Publisher, 1894. OCLC 50490393
