= USS Dolphin (SP-318) =

Patrol vessel of the United States Navy

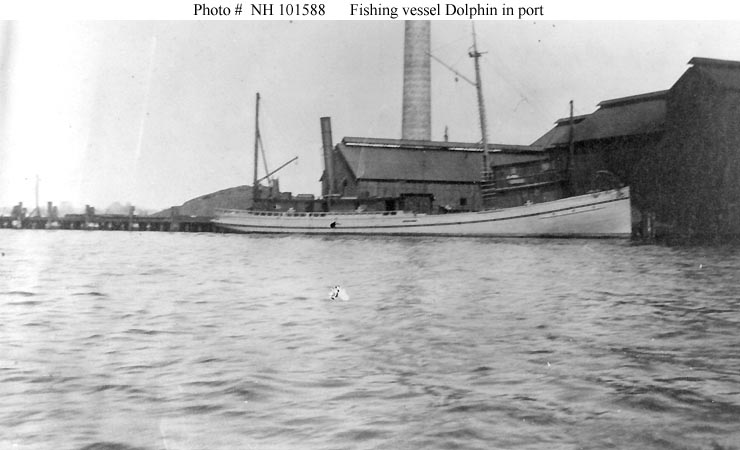
- The fishing vessel Dolphin, probably sometime between 1917 and 1919 while she was under consideration for use as a U.S. Navy patrol vessel.

History

United States
- Name: USS Dolphin (proposed)
- Namesake: Dolphin, various species of marine mammal closely related to whales and porpoises (previous name retained)
- Completed: 1908
- Acquired: Never
- Commissioned: Never
- Notes: Operated as civilian fishing vessel Virginia and Dolphin

General characteristics
- Type: Patrol vessel (proposed)
- Displacement: 176 tons
- Length: 128 ft (39 m)
- Beam: 19 ft 7 in (5.97 m)
- Draft: 9 ft 4 in (2.84 m)
- Propulsion: Steam engine
- Complement: 26 (proposed)

USS Dolphin (SP-262) was the proposed name and designation for a United States Navy patrol vessel that the Navy never actually acquired.

Dolphin was built as the commercial steam fishing vessel Virginia at Pocomoke City, Maryland. She was of the "menhaden fisherman" design. She was rebuilt in 1911, and at some point between 1908 and 1917 was renamed Dolphin.

The U.S. Navy considered acquiring Dolphin in 1917 for World War I service as a patrol vessel and assigned her the section patrol number SP-318. Although reported by some contemporary sources as having been placed in commission in February 1919 as USS Dolphin (SP-318), she in fact appears never to have been acquired by the Navy and to have remained in civilian hands.

Dolphin should not be confused with USS Dolphin (Gunboat No. 24), a gunboat and dispatch vessel in commission at the time, or with USS Dolphin (SP-874), a patrol vessel in commission during 1918.
