= Delfin-class submarine =

Delfin-class submarine may refer to one of the following classes of submarine:

- Russian submarine Delfin, the first combat-capable Russian submarine, commissioned in 1903
- Greek Delfin-class submarine, a French-built class of two submarines built for the Royal Hellenic Navy in 1910, named for the Greek submarine Delfin (1912)
- Soviet Delfin-class submarine an alternative name for the Delta IV class of nuclear, ballistic-missile submarines employed by the Soviet Navy
- Russian Delfin-class submarine, an alternative name for the Delta IV class of nuclear, ballistic-missile submarines employed by the Russian Navy
- Spanish Delfin-class submarine, an alternative name for Daphné-class submarines of the Spanish Navy

== See also ==
- Delfim-class submarine, a class of Portuguese Navy submarines
- Dolphin (disambiguation)
