= The Dolphins (band) =

US Jazz band

The Dolphins were an American fusion band founded 1987 in New York. The band consisted of Mike DeMicco (guitar), Vinnie Martucci (keyboard), Rob Leon (bass guitar), and Dan Brubeck (drums and percussion), a son of the jazz pianist Dave Brubeck. The band recorded three albums in the 1990s and went on several international tours.

== Discography ==
- The Dolphins: Malayan Breeze (DMP 1990)
- The Dolphins: Old World New World (DMP 1992)
- The Dolphins: Digital Dolphins (B&W Music 1996).
