= USS Dolphin (SP-874) =

Patrol vessel of the United States Navy

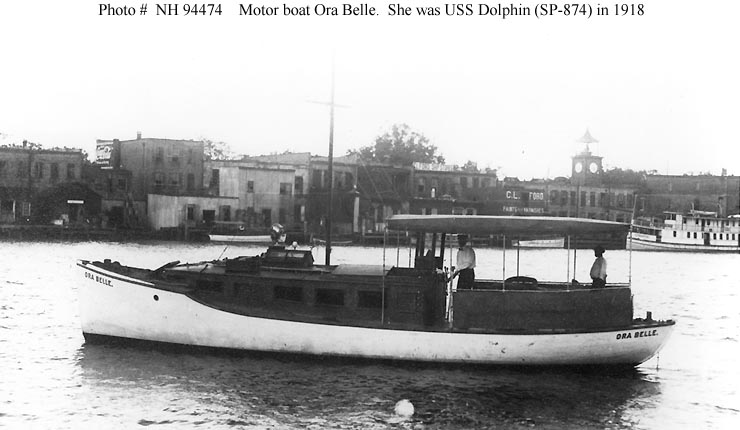
- The civilian motorboat Ora Belle sometime between 1911 and 1918, prior to her service as USS Dolphin (SP-874).

History

United States
- Name: Ora Belle (1911–1918); USS Dolphin (1918); Dolphin (1918–)
- Namesake: Dolphin, various species of marine mammal closely related to whales and porpoises (previous name retained)
- Builder: H. C. Carson Love
- Completed: 1911
- Acquired: 21 July 1918
- Commissioned: 24 August 1918
- Fate: Returned to owner 16 December 1918

General characteristics
- Type: Patrol vessel
- Length: 40 ft (12 m)

The fifth USS Dolphin (SP-874) was a United States Navy patrol vessel in commission during 1918.

Dolphin was built as the civilian motorboat Ora Belle in 1911 by H. C. Carson Love. Used as a pleasure craft in the Charleston, South Carolina, area, she later was renamed Dolphin.

The US Navy acquired Dolphin on 21 July 1918 for World War I service as a patrol vessel. She was commissioned as USS Dolphin (SP-874) on 24 August 1918.

Assigned to the 6th Naval District, Dolphin operated on section patrol based at Charleston, South Carolina, for the rest of World War I.

Dolphin was returned to her owner on 16 December 1918.

Dolphin should not be confused with USS Dolphin (PG-24), a gunboat and dispatch vessel in commission at the time, or with USS Dolphin (SP-318), a fishing vessel the US Navy considered for service as a patrol vessel in 1917 but apparently never acquired from her owners.
