= Delfin (family) =

Ancient noble house of Venice, one of the founders of the Venetian state

Dolfin
- Venetian nobility
- Arms of the family
- Parent family: Gradenigo
- Country: Papal States; Republic of Venice; Habsburg monarchy Kingdom of Italy
- Current region: Italy
- Founded: V century
- Founder: Giovanni Gradenigo
- Titles: Bishop (non-hereditary); Cardinal (non-hereditary); Patriarch; Doge of Venice (non-hereditary); Dogaressa (non-hereditary); Count of the Austrian Empire; Count of the Kingdom of Italy; Knight of the Holy Roman Empire

The Delfin family (Dolfin in venician, sometimes Italianized as Delfin, Delfino, Delfini, and Dolfini) is a thousand-year-old noble family originally from Venice, whose origins date back to the medieval period because they were present even before the Serrata del Maggior Consiglio of 1297. Already included in the patriciate as an old house and one of the twelve apostolic families, the founders of the Venetian state, it is considered one of the richest, most powerful, and oldest in its history.

Members of the family distinguished themselves for their role in the political and military institutions of the Republic, where they acquired great prestige. One of these was, for example, Giovanni Dolfin, who served as the 56th Doge of the Republic of Venice, the only member of the family. As Venetian patricians, over the centuries, the family's descendants held important political roles in the Republic, such as procurators of Saint Mark and governors of cities and lands under Venetian rule, numerous members of the Quarantia and the Senate, land and sea generals, and diplomatic roles such as bailiffs and ambassadors for most countries in continental Europe. Numerous other members of the family were men of the church in the service of the Pope as bishops, patriarchs, and cardinals.

They were also influential and skilled traders, who knew how to manipulate the economic dynamics of thalassocratic Venice, especially through marital alliances as strategic tools to consolidate economic and political power. The family included the Dolfin branch, known as "dal Banco", which owned the bank of the same name. As the lone heir of his father's wealth, Zuanne Dolfin was a successful business man, who married a member of the evenly powerful Vendramin family, and could afford to hire the principal architect of his city Jacopo Sansovino to design his Palazzo (Palazzo Dolfin Manin) situated near the Rialto Bridge between its commercial and political center. Oover the centuries, they owned numerous residences both in Venice and the areas controlled by the Serenissima.

Like the Gonzagas in Mantua, the fame of the Dolfins in Venice and in Italy is above all linked to their patronage of the culture of architecture, literature, sculpture and painting. In fact, they requested the services of the major exponents of what is today called the Venetian school, including Giovanni Bellini, Francesco Sansovino, Titian, Giambattista Tiepolo, Niccolò Bambini, Bernardo Strozzi, and many others. The family also had a modest influence in the musical field: both as patrons, having requested the services of composers such as Antonio Vivaldi, Antonio Martinelli, and Francisco José de Castro, and as concert organizers, owning numerous theaters in the major cities of the Serenissima. Some literary works have been dedicated to some members of the family. Examples are La donna di garbo and La bella selvaggia by Carlo Goldoni and La metamorfosi della modestia by Giuseppe Beccarelli.

Despite the decline of the political power of the Republic of Venice, the artistic and cultural legacy of the family is still appreciated today.

== Notable members ==
- Domenico Dolfin, Duke of Candia (1216-1217)
- Giacomo Dolfin, Duke of Candia (1261-1262)
- Baldovino Dolfin (1275-1335), statesman.
- Giovanni Dolfin (c. 1290-1361), 57th Doge of Venice
- Leonardo Delfino (1353-1415) Patriarch of Alexandria
- Dolfin Dolfin, captain during the fall of Constantinople in 1453
- Zaccaria Delfino (1527–1583), Cardinal (by Pius IV)
- Giovanni Delfin (1529-1584), Bishop of Brescia and Torcello
- Gentile Dolfino (+1601), Bishop of Camerino
- Giovanni Delfin (1545-1622), Cardinal (by Clemens VIII)
- Flaminio Delfin (1552-1605), Commander General of the Papal Armies
- Vittoria Delfin, mother of Pope Clement X
- Giovanni Delfino (1589-1651), Bishop of Belluno
- Giovanni Dolfin (1617-1699), Cardinal (by Alexander VII) and poet
- Daniel Delfin (1653–1704), Cardinal (by Innocent XII) and Patriarch of Aquileia
- Daniel Delfin (1656-1729), Admiral of the Venetian Fleet
- Dionisus Delfin (1663–1734), Patriarch of Aquileia
- Daniele Delfin (1688-1762), Cardinale (by Benedict XIV), Patriarch of Aquileia
- Giovanni Paolo Delfini (1736-1819), Bishop
- Caterina Dolfin (1736-1796), poet
- Daniel Delfin (1748-1798), statesman and diplomat (ambassador to Louis XVI of France)

== The Dolfins as builders ==
For a comprehensive list of the (former) family's realties see the Italian Wikipedia: Palazzi e dimore della famiglia Dolfin

Venice (parocchia, sestiere)

- Palazzo and Palazzetto Dolfin (at Canal Grande), Santi Apostoli, Cannaregio, ca. 1400 (upper floor added in 17th century)
- Palazzo Dolfin Manin (at Canal Grande), San Pantalon, Dorsoduro, commissioned by Zuanne Dolfin, 1538
- Palazzo Dolfin (at Canal Grande), San Tomà, San Polo, originally Gothic, renovations (windows) in 16th and 17th century
- Ca' Dolfin (or Palazzo Secco Dolfin, today Ca' Foscari University of Venice, Canal Grande), San Salvador, San Marco, renovations by Nicolò Dolfin, after its purchase in 1621
- Palazzo Dolfin Bollani, Santa Marina, Castello
- Palazzo Dolfin, San Lorenzo, Castello

Veneto

- Villa Dolfin Boldù, Este (Padua)
- Palazzo Dolfin Casale, Rosà
- Villa Dolfin Boldù Cantele, Rosà, 1650

other locations

- Palazzo Patriarcale, Udine, Friaul, by Dionisio Delfino, 1708
- Chiesa di Sant'Antonio Abate, Udine, facade comm. by Dionisio Delfino, 1731
- Palazzo Dolfin Compostella, Crema, Lombardy, by Nicolò Dolfin (podestà of Crema), 1593
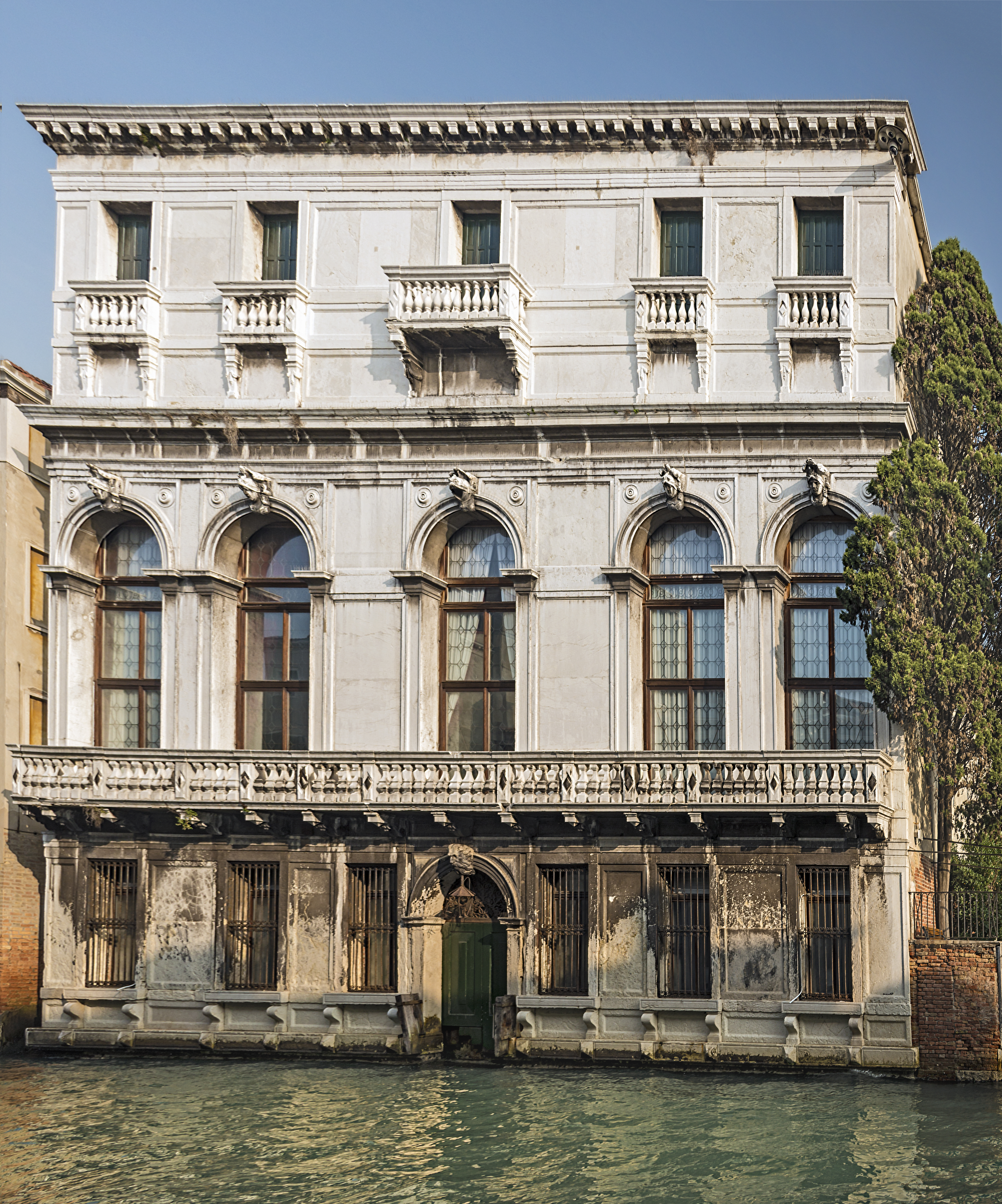
Palazzo Ca' Dolfin

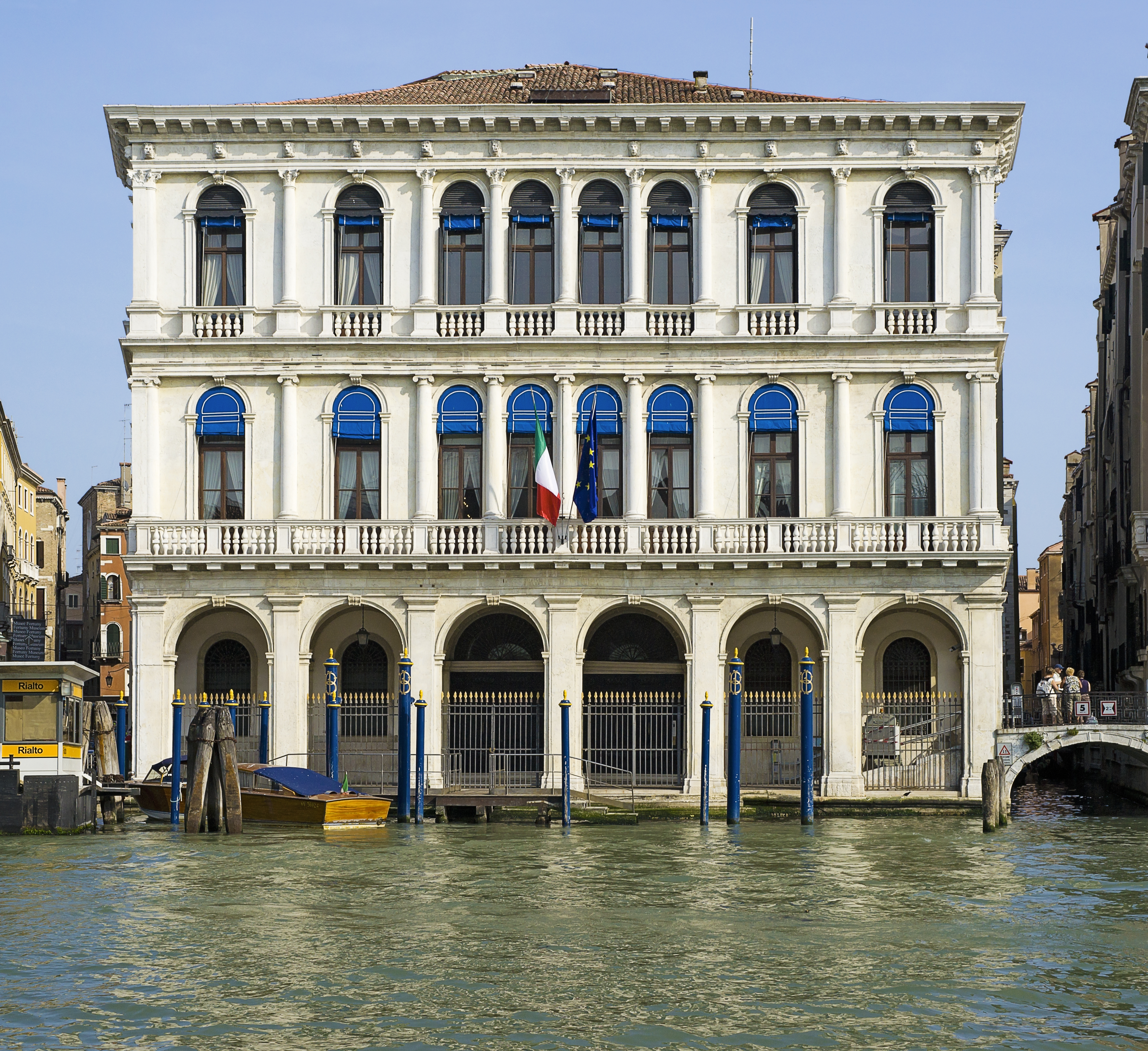
Palazzo Dolfin Manin

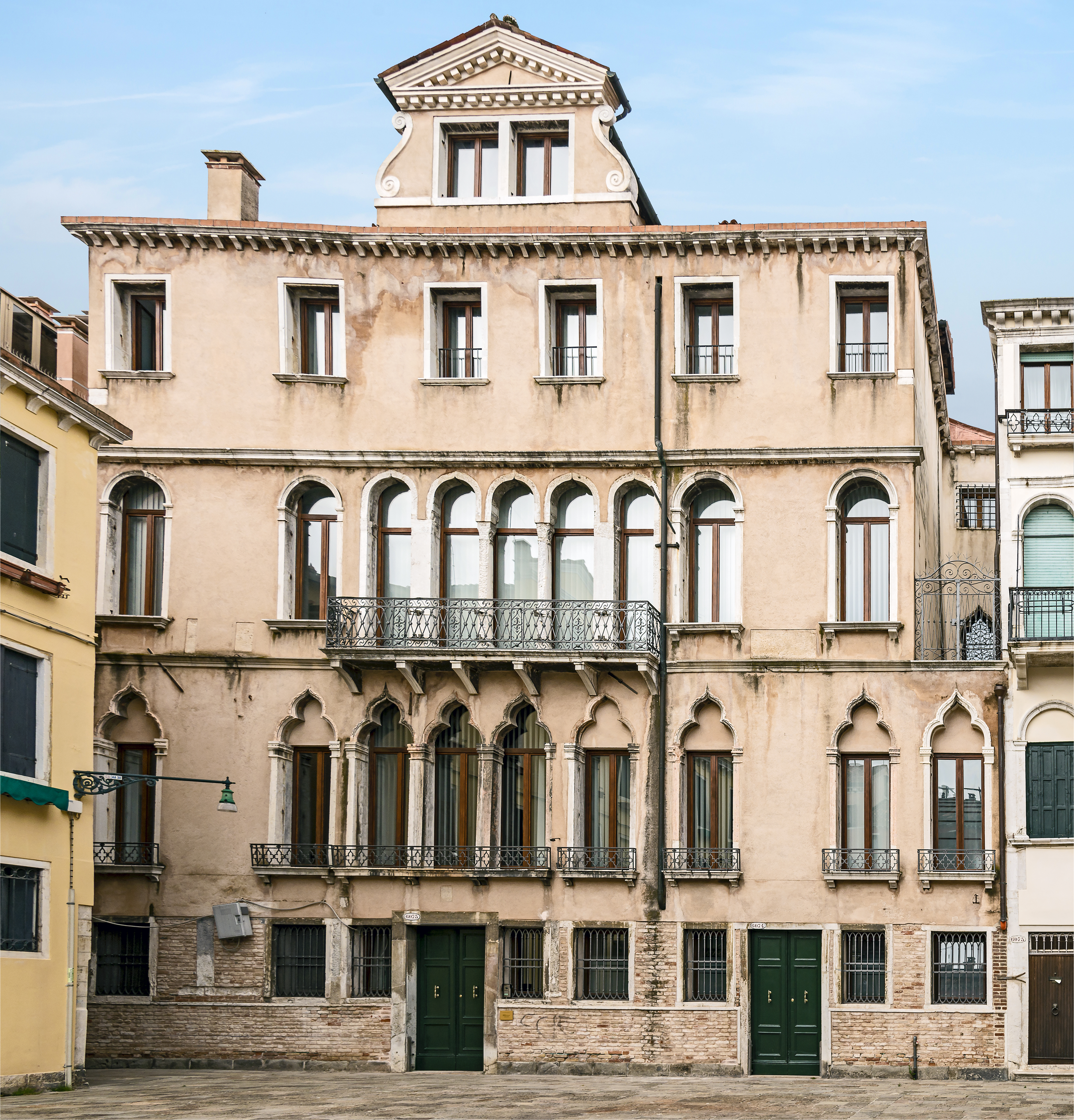
Palazzo Dolfin Bollani

== Bibliography ==
- Cardinale Delfino (patriarca d'Aquileia). Rituale romano illustrato. Bettinelli, Venezia 1749.
- B. G. Dolfin. I Dolfin patrizi veneziani nella storia di Venezia dal 452 al 1923. Milano 1923.
- Ganzer, Gilberto. Splendori di una dinastia: L'eredita europea dei Manin e dei Dolfin.
- P. Gradenigo. Ambasciatori veneti. Cc. 60, 164, 302, 308v.
- Howard, Deborah (2002). The Architectural History of Venice (revised and expanded ed.). New Haven, London: Yale University Press. pp. 106 f. ISBN 0-300-09029-3.
