= Delphinus (disambiguation) =

Delphinus is a constellation.

Delphinus may also refer to:

- Delphinus (genus), the genus name of the common dolphin in taxonomy
- the former name of the USS Pegasus, a hydrofoil of the US Navy
- HIMS Delphinus, one of two main airships in the video game Skies of Arcadia
- R-100 Delphinus, a series of aircraft in the video game Ace Combat 3: Electrosphere
