= Delfim da Câmara =

Brazilian portrait painter

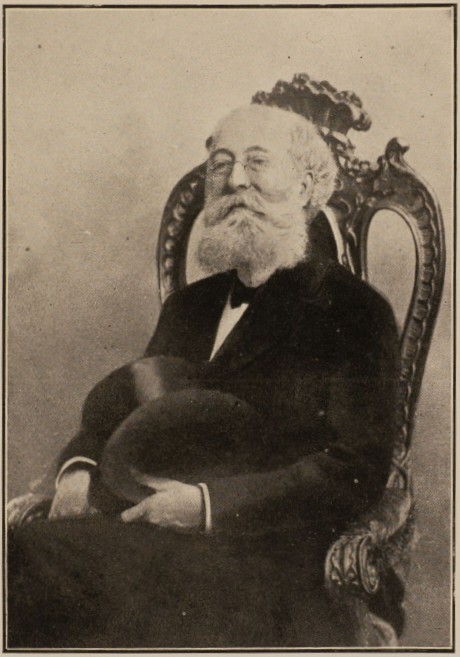
Delfim da Câmara

Delfim Joaquim Maria Martins da Câmara (1834 – c. 1916?), better known as Delfim da Câmara, was a Brazilian portrait painter.

== Biography ==
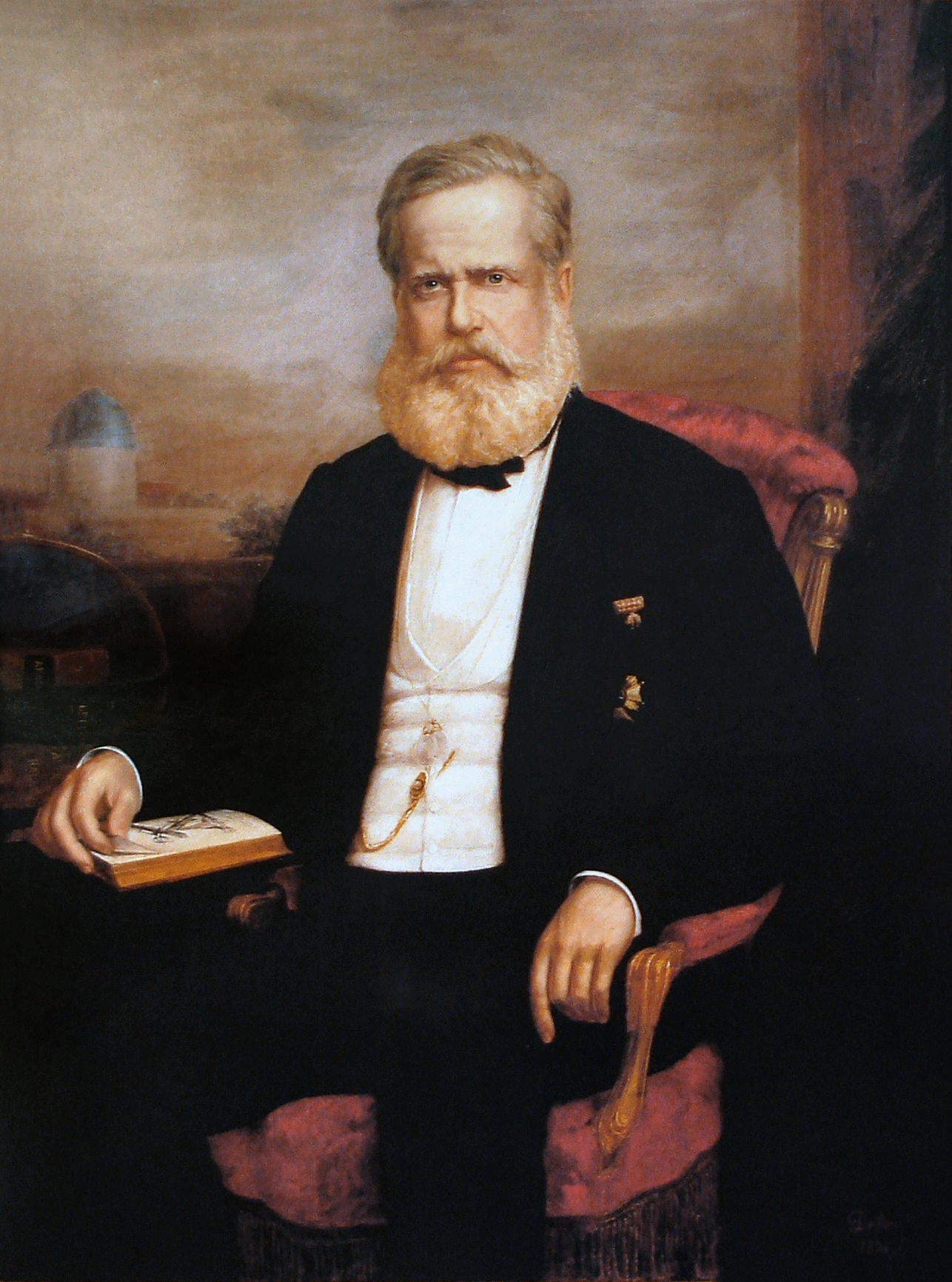
A portrait of Emperor Pedro II by Câmara

At the age of fourteen, he was enrolled at the Academia Imperial de Belas Artes, where he studied with Manuel Joaquim de Melo Corte Real, Costa Miranda and José Correia de Lima. He obtained several awards as a student; notably the Great Gold Medal for historical painting (1850), coming in second to Victor Meirelles for a travel scholarship. He made a second attempt to win the scholarship in 1857, but was once again unsuccessful, so he left the Academia to study on his own.

Apparently frustrated in his ambitions to become an artist, he moved to Porto Alegre, shortly before the outbreak of the Paraguayan War; working as an engraver and scenographer. When the war began, he enlisted in the Provincial Army. He was eventually promoted to captain, and returned to Porto Alegre in 1870. Four years later, he went back to Rio de Janeiro and established a studio near the Imperial Court; devoting himself to portraits.

Initially, he preferred to avoid publicity, but his portrait of the Visconde de Pelotas attracted so much praise at the Court that he suddenly found himself in great demand. Despite this, he continued to live modestly and generally avoided socializing. His reputation was sealed when he received praise from the influential critic, Gonzaga Duque.

He occasionally worked teaching design at the Liceu de Artes e Ofícios, the Escola Politécnica, his alma mater, the Academia, and the Colégio Pedro II.

After his retirement, he appears to have become a recluse. His date and place of death are not known for certain.

== Sources ==
- José Roberto Teixeira Leite. Dicionário crítico da pintura no Brasil. Rio de Janeiro: Artlivre, 1988 ISBN 978-85-691-8810-0
- Athos Damasceno. Artes plásticas no Rio Grande do Sul. Porto Alegre: Globo, 1970.
