= Dolphin Hotel, Southampton =

Hotel in Hampshire, England

Dolphin Hotel
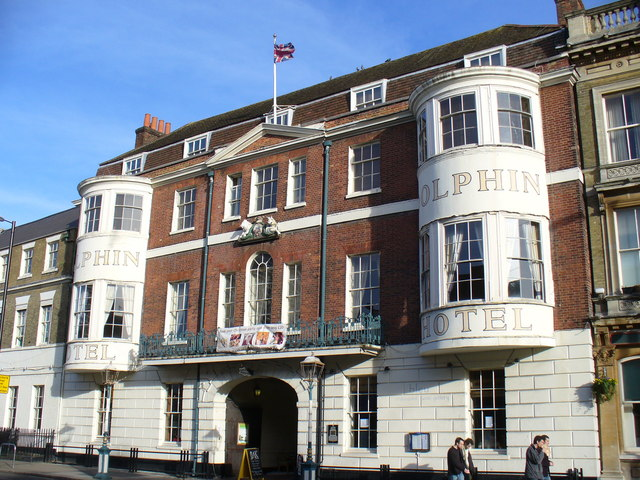

- Location within Southampton
- 50°54′0.2″N 1°24′13.0″W
- Type: Hotel
- Location: 34 & 35 High Street, Southampton
- OS grid reference: SU 42035 11352

History
- Built: Before 1454

Site notes
- Area: Hampshire
- Owner: Mercure Hotels

Listed Building – Grade II*
- Official name: Dolphin Hotel
- Designated: 14 July 1953
- Reference no.: 1178854

The Dolphin Hotel is a Grade II* listed 4-star hotel, which is the oldest in Southampton, Hampshire. Recorded mentions of the hotel date back to 1454 although it is believed to older than this and remnants of the original medieval timbers, and stone vaulting are extant.

The hotel was a famous coaching inn during the 17th-century and became quite fashionable during the city's stint as a spa-town from 1750 to 1820. The Georgian frontage, complete with coaching entrance and oriel windows, said to be the biggest in England, was added about 1760.

After a period of closure the hotel reopened on 4 May 2010 following a £4 million redevelopment programme.

In November 2021, the hotel became used exclusively for asylum seekers. In April 2024, plans to convert it to student accommodation were announced.

== Guests and ghosts ==
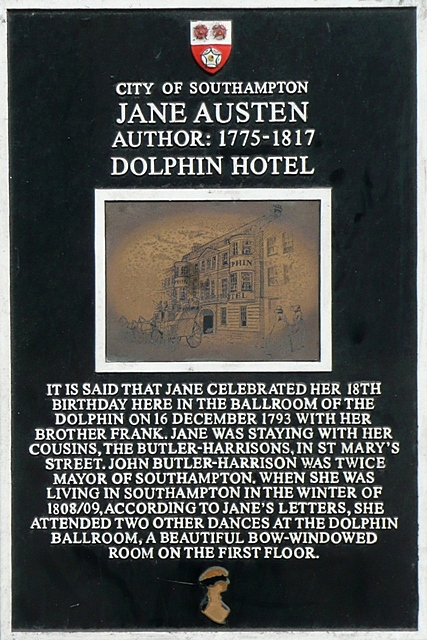
Plaque commemorating Jane Austen's visit

Famous guests have included Queen Victoria, Admiral Lord Nelson, Edward Gibbon, William Makepeace Thackery and Jane Austen, who celebrated her 18th birthday there in 1793.

Molly, a maid seen gliding across the ground floor from the legs up, is the most famous of the hotel's six reported resident ghosts.
