= HNLMS Dolfijn =

HNLMS Dolfijn (Dutch: Hr.Ms. or Zr.Ms. Dolfijn) may refer to following ships of the Royal Netherlands Navy:

- HNLMS Dolfijn (1942), ex-HMS P47
- HNLMS Dolfijn (1948), ex-HMS Taurus (P339)
- HNLMS Dolfijn (S808), a Dolfijn-class submarine
- HNLMS Dolfijn (1990) (S808), a Walrus-class submarine

== See also ==
- De Dolfijn, a Dutch ship involved in the Kettle War of 1784
