= Dolphin School =

Dolphin School is the name of a number of schools in the United Kingdom:

- Dolphin School (Battersea)
- Dolphin School, Hurst (Berkshire)
- Dolphin School (Nottinghamshire)

Dolphin School may also refer to:

- Dolphin Public School Chipiyana, a school in Uttar Pradesh, India
- Dolphin Senior Public School, a school in Ontario, Canada
