= NRP Delfim =

NRP Delfim may refer to two ships of the Portuguese Navy:

- NRP Delfim (D), a Delfim-class submarine in commission from 1934 to 1950.
- NRP Delfim (S166), an Albacora-class submarine in commission from 1969 to 2005.
