= The Dolphins (sculpture) =

1975 artwork by David Moore in Galveston, Texas, U.S.

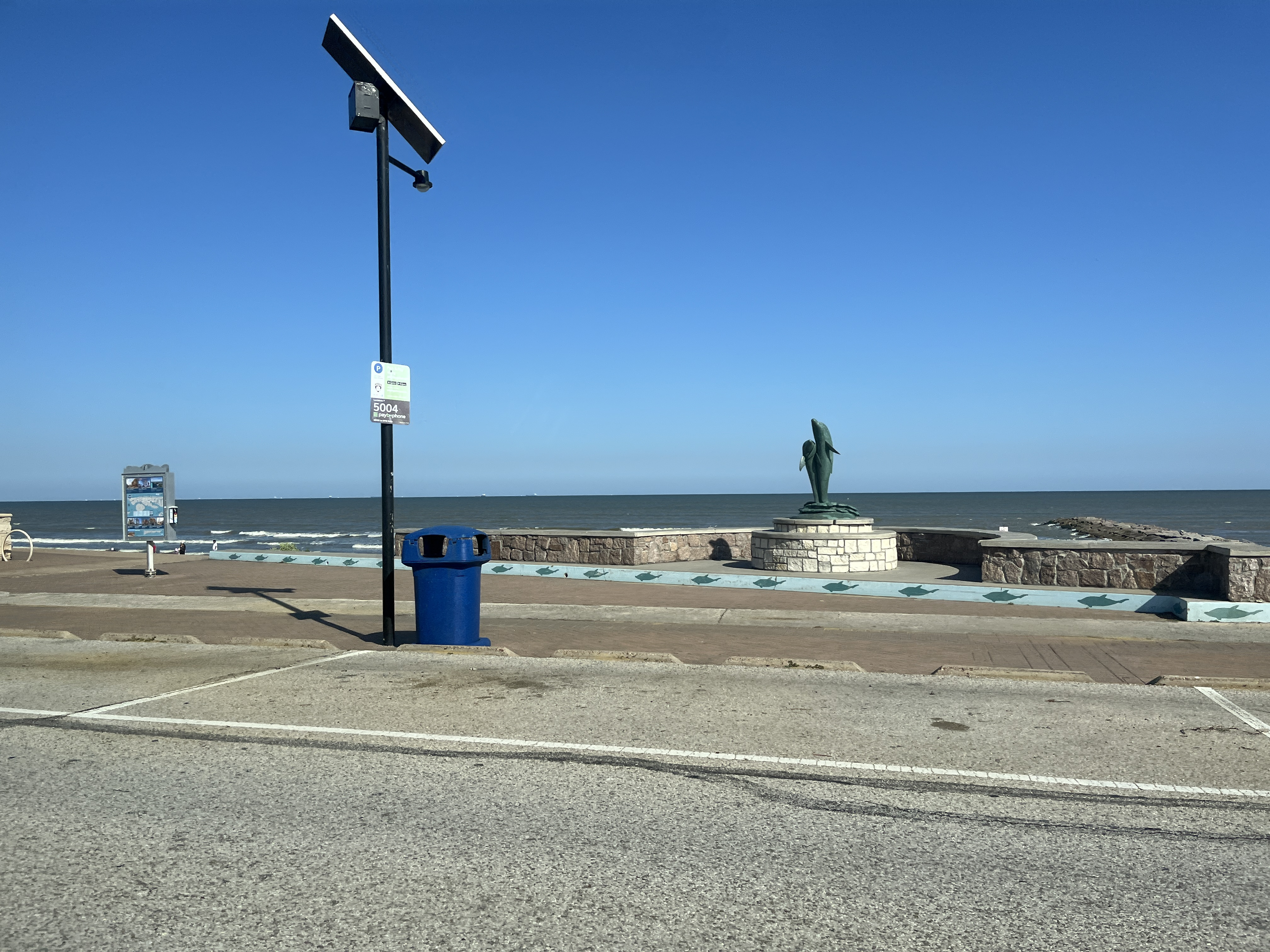
- The sculpture along the Galveston Seawall, 2024
- Artist: David Moore
- Year: 1975
- Medium: Bronze sculpture
- Location: Galveston, Texas, U.S.
- 29°16′28.1″N 94°48′44.1″W

The Dolphins is a 1975 sculpture by David Moore (1921–2001), installed in Galveston, Texas. It was relocated by the city's Cultural Arts Commission.

== Description ==
The bronze sculpture depicting two dolphins is installed along the Seawall in Galveston, Texas. It is approximately 6 feet tall and has a diameter of approximately 4 feet. A plaque reads: "This Fountain is a Gift / to / The Citizens of Galveston / From / Galveston Foundation, Inc. / 1975 / David W. Moore / Sculptor".

== History ==
The work was commissioned in September 1974, cast on March 5, 1975, and dedicated on June 10, 1975. It was surveyed by the Smithsonian Institution's "Save Outdoor Sculpture!" program in 1993.

== See also ==
- 1900 Storm Memorial, also installed along the Seawall
- 1975 in art
