= Delfín Fernández Martínez =

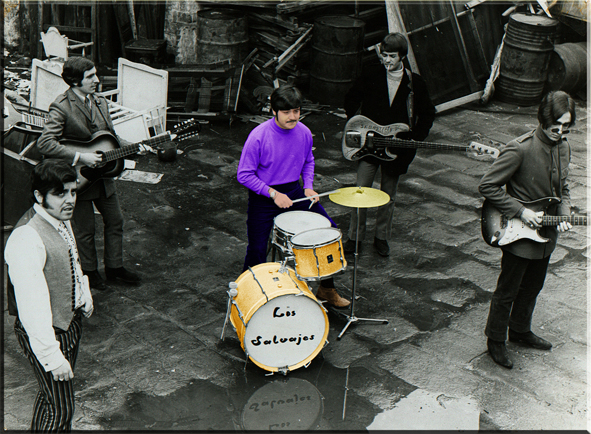
Delfín Fernández (in the center), with Los Salvajes.

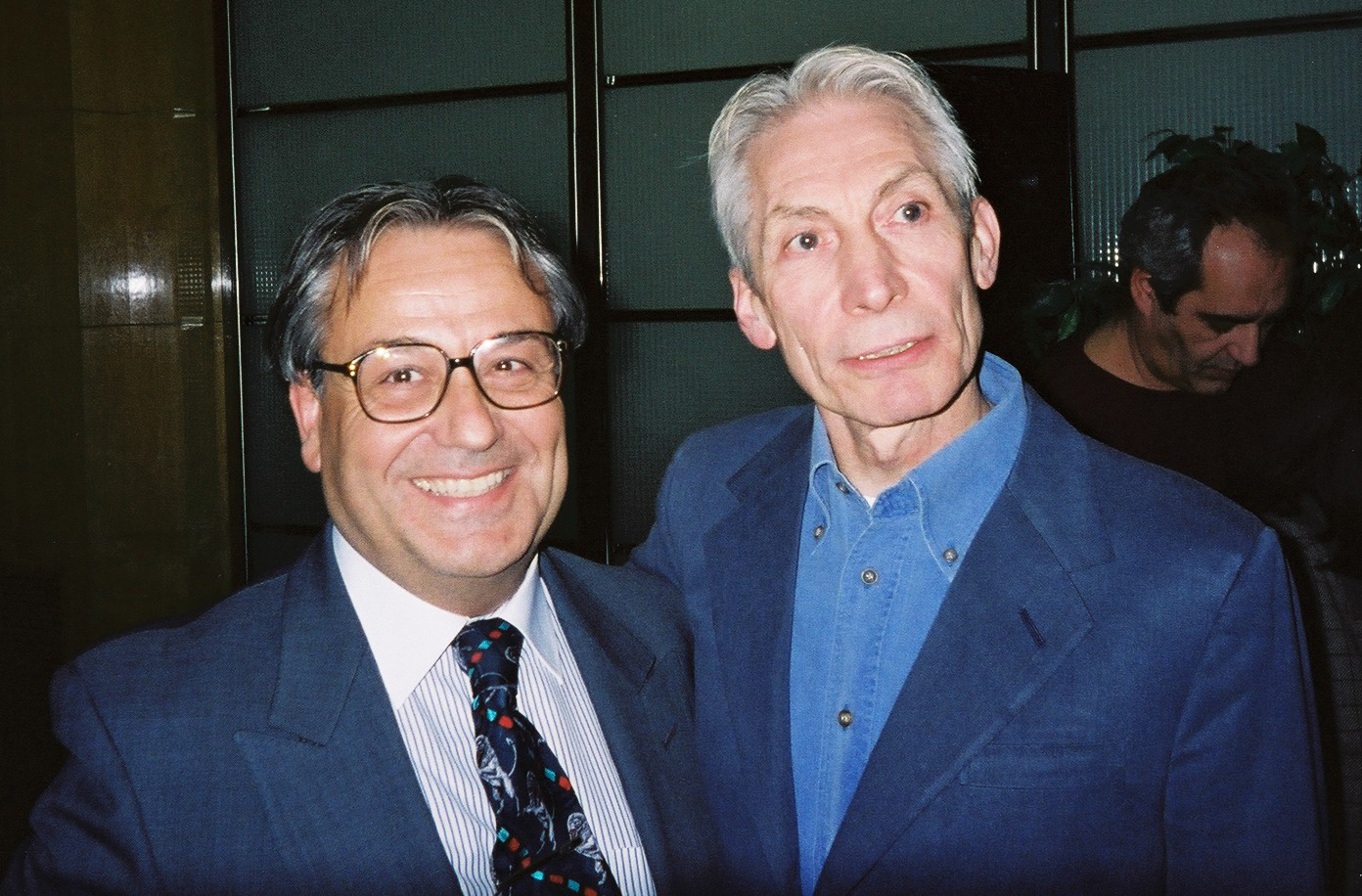
Delfín Fernández with Charlie Watts in 2001.

Delfín Fernández Martínez (born January 15, 1948, in Barcelona) is the founding member of the Spanish rock band Los Salvajes.

They were born and grew up in Poble Sec, where he met Gaby Alegret and Francesc Miralles, with whom he founded Los Salvajes in 1962, known as the "Spanish Rolling Stones".

Currently, he leads his band called "Delfín Fernández Band".

His training (learned beating chairs) made Delfín a drummer in the Spanish rock scene.

Influenced by the great drummers of the '60s, Ringo Starr or Keith Moon, Delfín confesses his predilection and admiration for Charlie Watts. His favourite drums are: Premier, and Gretch.

== Discography ==
- 1964 Hoy comienza mi vida - Nada ha cambiado - Boys - Con el corazón
- 1965 Siluetas - Goodbye my love - Hielo en vez de amor - No me digas adiós
- 1965 Se llama Maria - Satisfacion - Wolly Bully - Ya te tengo
- 1966 Al Capone - Pienso en ti - Paff bum- A la buena de Dios
- 1966 La neurastemia - Soy asi - Corre, corre - These Boots are made for walking
- 1966 Todo negro - Una chica igual que tu -1966 - Es la edad - Que alguien me ayude
- 1967 Las ovejitas - Rosa de papel - Es mejor dejarlo como esta - No me puedo controlar
- 1967 Mi bigote - Fuera de mi corazón - Vivir sin ti - El bote que remo
- 1967 Massachusetts - El Don Juan
- 1967 LP "Lo Mejor de Los Salvajes"
- 1968 Judy con disfraz - Palabras
- 1968 Vuelve baby - Algo de titere
- 1968 Los platillos volantes - Un mensaje te quiero mandar
- 1969 Nana - I need your loving
