= Delfino (name) =

Delfino is a masculine given name and surname. Notable people with the name include:

== Surname ==
- Alejandro Delfino (born 1962), original name of Alex To, Hong Kong singer and actor
- Carlos Delfino (born 1982), Argentine professional basketball player
- Daniel Delfino (born 1970), Argentine former professional association football player
- Frank Delfino (1911–1997), American actor
- Frank Delfino, fictional character played by Charlie Weber (List of How to Get Away with Murder characters)
- Giuseppe Delfino (1921–1999), Italian fencer
- Jean-Paul Delfino (born 1964), French author
- Jessica Delfino (born 1976), American singer, songwriter and comedian
- Majandra Delfino (born 1981), Venezuelan-born American actress and singer
- Mariano Delfino (born 1977), Argentine former professional tennis player
- Mike Delfino, fictional character on Desperate Housewives

== Given name ==
- Delfino Borroni (1898–2008), Italian supercentenarian
- Delfino Codazzi (1824–1873), Italian mathematician
