= The Dolphin, Hackney =

Listed pub in London, England

The Dolphin
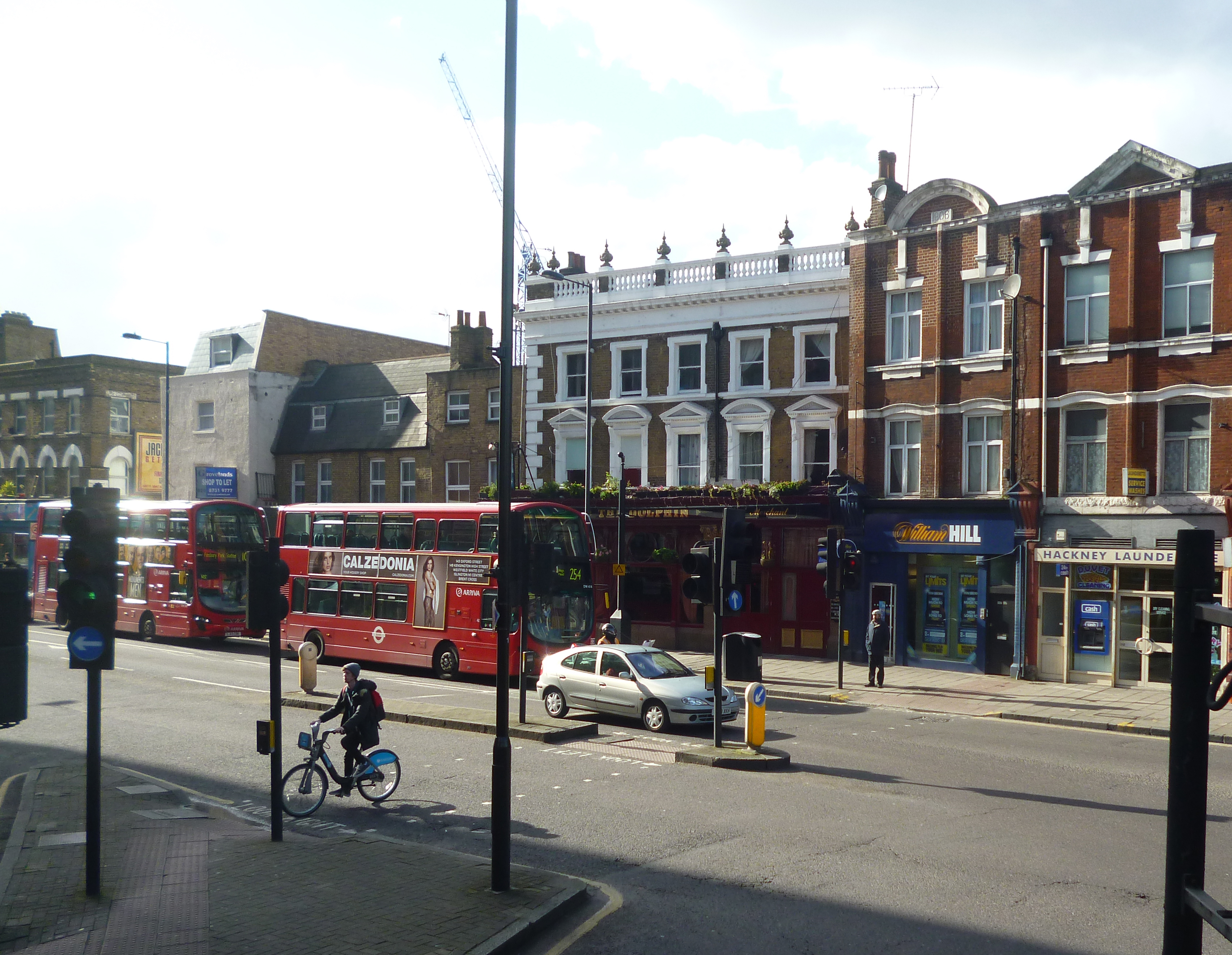
- The pub in 2014

- Location within London Borough of Hackney Location within Greater London

General information
- Type: Public house and nightclub
- Location: 165 Mare Street, Hackney, London, England
- Coordinates: 51°32′23″N 0°03′22″W
- Year built: c. 1850; 176 years ago
- Renovated: c. 1900 (remodelled)
- Owner: Stonegate

Design and construction
- Designations

Listed Building – Grade II
- Official name: The Dolphin public house
- Designated: 21 October 2003
- Reference no.: 1393174

Website
- thedolphinhackney.co.uk

The Dolphin is a Grade II listed public house and nightclub on Mare Street in Hackney Central, London, England. Dating from about 1850 and possibly incorporating parts of an earlier building, it was substantially remodelled around 1900. The pub is noted for its well-preserved historic interior, which is included in the Campaign for Real Ale's National Inventory of Historic Pub Interiors and is rated three stars, denoting an interior of "outstanding national historic importance". The pub faced licensing difficulties in the 2010s and temporarily closed in 2021 before reopening in 2023.

== History ==
The public house dates from about 1850, possibly incorporating part of an earlier structure, and was substantially remodelled around 1900, particularly at ground-floor level.

It was included on the Campaign for Real Ale (CAMRA)'s National Inventory of Historic Pub Interiors before the inventory's grading system was revised. Under the revised scheme, it is rated three stars and its interior is regarded as being "of outstanding national historic importance". On 21 October 2003, The Dolphin was designated a Grade II listed building.

In 2013, the pub faced possible closure after concerns were raised by police about levels of crime associated with the venue. A public campaign was launched in support of the pub. Later that year, Hackney Council revoked its late-night licence following a review of its operation. The licence was restored in 2014 after a successful appeal. In 2021, the pub's licence was suspended following a serious assault and concerns raised by police regarding the venue's response to the incident. After a period of closure, the pub reopened in June 2023 with reduced opening hours. As of August 2026 the freehold was owned by Stonegate.

== Architecture ==
=== Exterior ===
The building is constructed of brick with painted decorative detailing, while the roof is concealed behind a parapet. It has a largely symmetrical layout with a projecting rear staircase section and an adjoining rear wing.

The three-storey front elevation is arranged in five bays and topped by a balustraded parapet with ornamental urns. The sash windows are set within decorative surrounds, and the ground floor retains a granite frontage with large pub windows and entrances at either end.

=== Interior ===
The interior is centred on a bar dating from around 1900 and retains many historic features despite later alterations. A plan from 1931 shows separate public and saloon bars at the front, with a dining room and lounge behind. The dining room survives behind a timber-and-glass screen, while part of the former lounge has been absorbed into other areas of the pub.

Other notable features include a staircase with decorative timber balusters, timber-panelled ceilings, wood-block flooring, and extensive decorative tiling throughout. Dolphin motifs appear repeatedly in the coloured glass screens and interior decoration. Painted panels at the entrances include a scene of Arion and the dolphin, created by W. B. Simpson & Sons of St Martin's Lane.

== See also ==
- List of pubs in London
