= Dolfin =

Dolfin may refer to:

== People ==
- Dolfin of Carlisle, 11th century Northumbrian magnate
- Delfini (family) (also spelled Delfin), an ancient noble Venetian family
  - Caterina Dolfin (1736-1793), Venetian poet
  - Daniele and Dionigio Dolfin, last and second-to-last head of the Patriarchate of Aquileia respectively
  - Dolfin Dolfin, a Venetian nobleman who played a role in the 1453 siege of Constantinople
  - Giampaolo Dolfin, (1736-1819) a Roman Catholic bishop
  - Giovanni Dolfin (died 1361), 57th Doge of Venice

== Other uses ==
- Dolfin Swimwear, an aquatic sportswear manufacturer
- DOLFIN, main interface to the software FEniCS Project

== See also ==
- Dolphin
