= Domenico Selvo =

Doge of Venice from 1071 to 1084

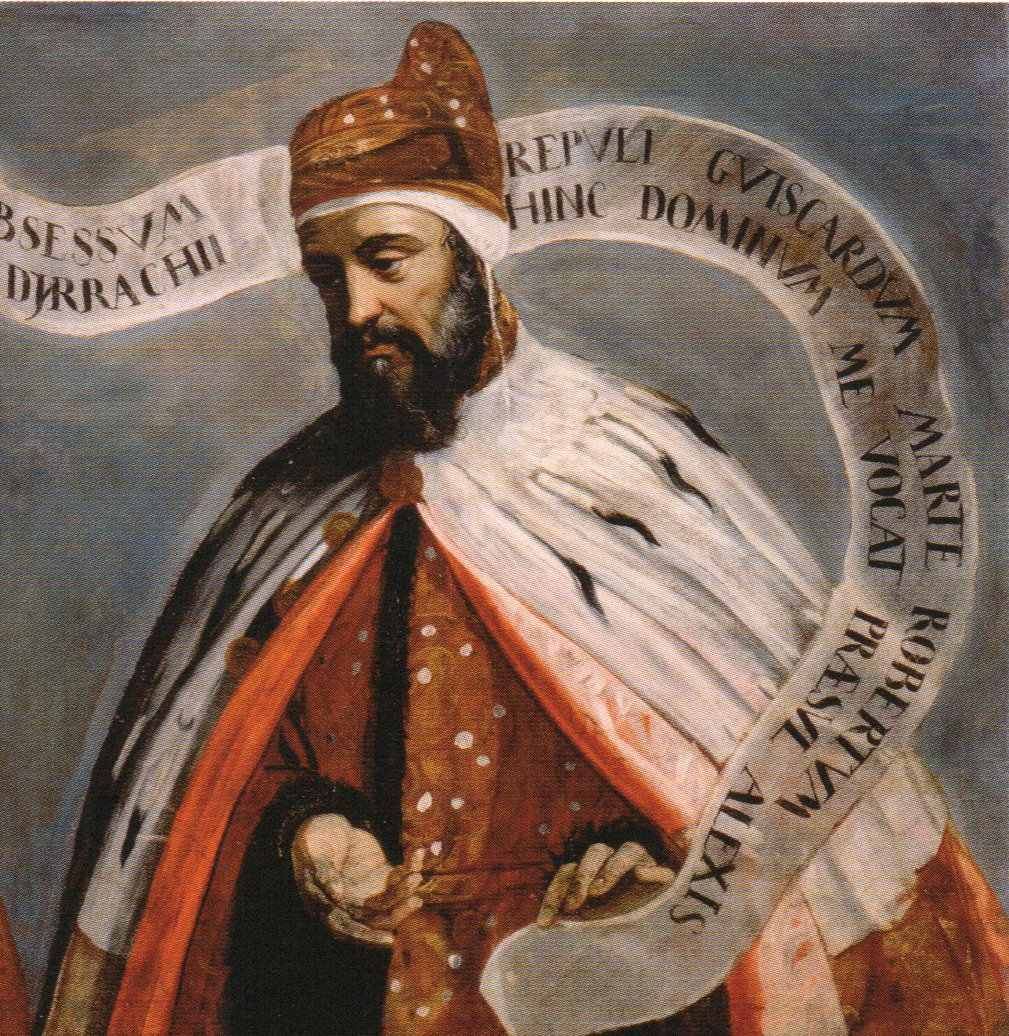
- Portrait in the Doge's Palace

Doge of Venice
- Reign: 1071–1084
- Predecessor: Domenico I Contarini
- Successor: Vitale Faliero
- Born: Venice
- Died: 1087; Venice
- Burial: St Mark's Basilica
- Spouse: First wife Theodora Anna Doukaina
- Issue: Domenico Selvo (with his first wife)
- House: Selvo

Domenico Selvo (died 1087) was the 31st Doge of Venice, serving from 1071 to 1084. During his reign as Doge, his domestic policies, the alliances that he forged, and the battles that the Venetian military won and lost laid the foundations for much of the subsequent foreign and domestic policy of the Republic of Venice. He avoided confrontations with the Byzantine Empire, the Holy Roman Empire, and the Roman Catholic Church at a time in European history when conflict threatened to upset the balance of power. At the same time, he forged new agreements with the major nations that would set up a long period of prosperity for the Republic of Venice. Through his military alliance with the Byzantine Empire, Emperor Alexios I Komnenos awarded Venice economic favors with the declaration of a golden bull that would allow for the development of the republic's international trade over the next few centuries.

Within the city itself, he supervised a longer period of the construction of the modern St Mark's Basilica than any other Doge. The basilica's complex architecture and expensive decorations stand as a testament to the prosperity of Venetian traders during this period. The essentially democratic way in which he not only was elected but also removed from power was part of an important transition of Venetian political philosophy. His deposition in 1084 was one of many forced abdications in the early history of the republic that further blurred the lines between the powers of the Doge, the common electorate, and the nobility.

== Background ==
Beginning with the reign of Pietro II Candiano in 932, Venice saw a string of inept leaders such as Pietro III Candiano, Pietro IV Candiano, and Tribuno Memmo. The reputed arrogance and ambition of these Doges caused the deterioration of the relationship with the Holy Roman Empire in the west, the stagnancy of the relationship with the Byzantine Empire in the east, and discord at home in the Republic.

However, in 991, Pietro II Orseolo became the Doge and spent his reign pushing the boundaries of the Republic further east down the western coast of the Balkan Peninsula with his conquests in Dalmatia in 1000. This strengthened the commercial bonds with the empires of the east, Sicily, Northern Africa, and the Holy Roman Empire, and put an end to the infighting among the citizens of Venice. Pietro II's negotiations with Byzantine Emperor Basil II to decrease tariffs on Venetian-produced goods helped foster a new age of prosperity in the Republic as Venetian merchants could undercut the competition in the international markets of the Byzantine Empire. Similarly, Pietro II had success developing a new relationship with Holy Roman Emperor Otto III, who displayed his friendship to him by restoring previously seized lands to Venice, opening up routes of free trade between the two states, and exempting all Venetians from taxes in the Holy Roman Empire.

As the power and reputation of Pietro II grew, the Venetian people began to wonder if he was secretly planning to establish a hereditary monarchy. Their fears were confirmed when his son, Otto Orseolo (named after Otto III), assumed the title of Doge upon Pietro II's death in 1009, thereby becoming the youngest Doge in Venetian history at the age of 16. Scandal marked much of Otto's reign as he showed a clear inclination toward nepotism by elevating several relatives to positions of power. In 1026, he was deposed by his enemies and exiled to Constantinople, but his successor, Pietro Barbolano, had such difficulty in attempting to unite the city that it seemed infighting would once again seize Venice.

In 1030, Barbolano himself was deposed by those who wished to restore power to Otto Orseolo, but the former Doge lay dying in Constantinople and was unable to return from exile. Domenico Orseolo, a relative of Otto (possibly his younger brother) and a rather unpopular figure in Venice, attempted to seize the throne without waiting for the formality of an election, but as soon as he tried this, his many enemies, including those who pushed for the reinstatement of Otto, grew outraged that an Orseolo would assume the throne simply because he was the son of Pietro II. The power of the Doge was severely checked, and Domenico Flabanico, a successful merchant, was called by the people to the position of Doge. During his 9-year reign Flabanico enacted several key reforms that would restrict the power of future Doges, including a law forbidding the election of a son of a Doge.

Doge Domenico Contarini (1043–1071) had a relatively uneventful reign, healing the rift between the Doge and his subjects and regaining territory that had been lost in the east to the Kingdom of Croatia in the years following the deposition of Otto Orseolo. However, one fact remained: based on their actions in the first half of the 11th century, the majority of the people of Venice were clearly not in favor of having a royal hereditary class. This reality, coupled with the fresh memories of power-hungry Doges, set the stage for Domenico Selvo.

== Biography ==
=== Early life ===
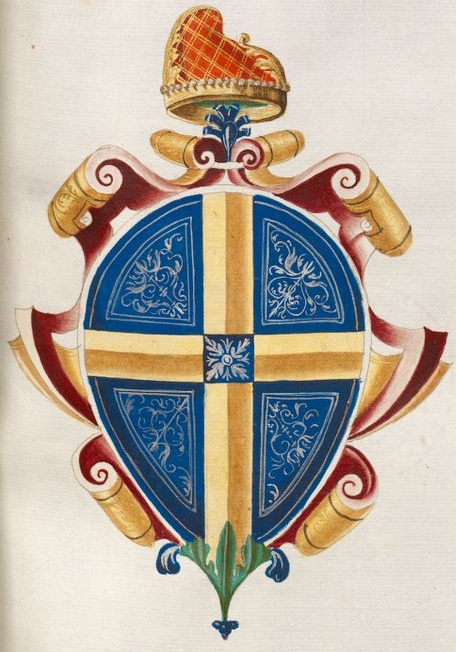
Coat of arms of the House of Selvo

What little is known of Selvo's past is based mostly on accounts of his reputation when he entered his Dogeship. Details of his family origins and even the year of his birth are unknown, but it can be assumed that he was a Venetian noble because only members of this class were elected to the position of Doge at this point in the Republic's history. Selvo supposedly belonged to a family in the patrician class from the sestiere of Dorsoduro who were allegedly of ancient Roman origin, possibly from one of the tribunes. He had also apparently been an ambassador to Holy Roman Emperor Henry III and he was certainly ducal counselor to Domenico Contarini prior to his election as Doge. Being connected to the relatively popular Doge might have been one of the causes for his own apparent initial popularity.

=== Election as Doge ===
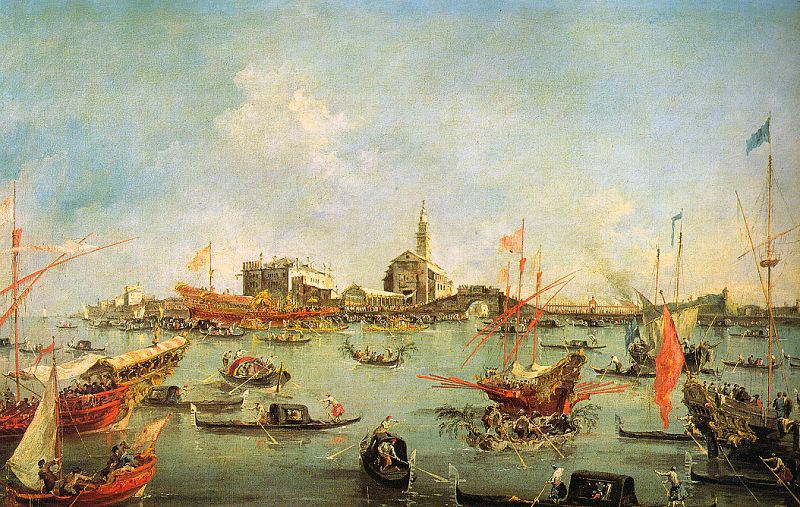
Boaters with San Nicolò in the background on Lido on Ascension Day in the 18th century as depicted by Francesco Guardi. According to the descriptions, the election of Domenico Selvo must have looked very similar to this celebration.

Selvo is notable for being the first Doge in the history of Venice whose election was recorded by an eyewitness, a parish priest of the church of San Michele Archangelo by the name of Domenico Tino. The account gives historians a valuable glimpse of the power of the popular will of the Venetian people. Over the previous two centuries, the rule of quasi-tyrannies had plagued the popular belief that Venetians held democratic control over their leaders. The events of Selvo's election occurred in the spring of 1071, when the nearly thirty-year reign of Doge Domenico Contarini came to an end upon his death.

According to Tino's account, on the day of the election, Selvo was attending mass for the funeral of the late Doge at the new monastery church of San Nicolò built under Domenico Contarini on Lido, an island in the Venetian Lagoon. The location was ideal for the funeral of a Doge not only because St Mark's Basilica was under construction at the time, but the new church was also spacious enough to hold a fairly large number of people. The location also proved ideal for the election of a new Doge for the very same reasons.

After the funeral, a large crowd assembled in their gondolas and armed galleys. Domenico Tino says "an innumerable multitude of people, virtually all Venice" was there to voice their opinion on the selection of a new Doge. After the bishop of Venice asked "who would be worthy of his nation," the crowds chanted, "Domenicum Silvium volumus et laudamus" (We want Domenico Selvo and we praise him). The people, according to the account, had clearly spoken, and with these cries, the election was over. A group of more distinguished citizens then lifted the Doge-elect above the roaring crowd, and he was transported as such back to the city. Barefoot, in accordance with tradition, Selvo was led into St Mark's Basilica where, amidst the construction materials and scaffolding, he prayed to God, received his staff of office, heard the oaths of fidelity from his subjects, and was legally sworn in as the 31st Doge of Venice.

The Republic of Venice, the Norman states of Apulia & Calabria and the County of Sicily, ruled by Robert Guiscard, and the other states surrounding the Adriatic Sea in 1084

=== Peace and prosperity (1071–1080) ===
During the first decade of his rule, Selvo's policies were largely a continuation of those of Domenico Contarini. There were few armed conflicts at home or abroad, and the Doge enjoyed a period of popularity due to the prosperous economic conditions. The relations with the Holy Roman Empire were gradually strengthened to a level unknown since the reign of the last Orseolo through relatively free trade and the good relationship that Selvo maintained with Emperor Henry IV. The importance of the economic alliance between the two nations became increasingly crucial when the historically shared power of the Holy Roman Emperor and the Pope was challenged by the Investiture Controversy between Henry IV and Pope Gregory VII. Selvo had to walk an extremely tight line of competing priorities. On the one hand, he wanted to maintain the trade agreement Venice had with the lands occupied by Henry IV, but on the other hand, Venetians were religiously loyal to Roman Catholicism as opposed to the Eastern Orthodoxy. At the height of the controversy, Pope Gregory VII privately threatened to excommunicate Selvo and put an interdict on the Venetian Republic, but Selvo was able to narrowly escape this by diplomatically asserting Venice's religious power as the reputed holders of the remains of St Mark.

In the east, Selvo not only maintained good trade relations with the Byzantine Empire, but also married into their royal family to consolidate the alliance that had existed for many years between the two nations. In 1075, Selvo married Theodora Doukas, daughter of Constantine X and sister of the reigning emperor, Michael VII. Though Venetians, especially the nobles, were wary of the pageantry that accompanied the marriage and the royal bride, the strengthened alliance meant even greater mobility for Venetian merchants in the east. Though the popularity of the new dogaressa was not great, Selvo was the hero of the merchant class that had had even greater political sway since the depositions of the Orseoli.

=== Victory (1081–1083) ===
Despite the relative peace of the early years of Selvo's reign, the forces that would eventually lead to his deposition had already swung into action. In southern Italy, the Duke of Apulia and Calabria, Robert Guiscard, had spent the majority of his reign consolidating Norman power along the heel and toe of lo Stivale by expelling the Byzantine armies. Guiscard was pushing north toward the Papal States (to which the Duchy of Apulia and Calabria was allied), and was threatening Byzantine control of cities along the Ionian and Adriatic seas. In May 1081, Guiscard led his army and navy across the sea to lay siege to the port city of Durazzo, as it was one end of the famous Via Egnatia, a direct route to the Byzantine capital of Constantinople. Alexios I Komnenos, the newly crowned Byzantine Emperor, dispatched an urgent message to Selvo asking for the mobilization of the Venetian fleet in defense of Durazzo in return for great rewards. The Doge wasted no time in setting sail for the besieged city in charge of his fleet of 14 warships and 45 other vessels. Selvo was motivated not only by his familial ties and the promise of reward, but also the realization that Norman control over the Strait of Otranto would be just as great of a threat to Venetian power in the region as it would be to their ally in the east.

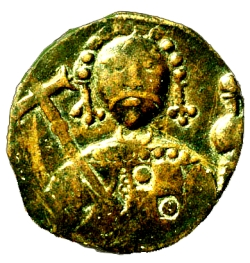
Robert Guiscard as depicted on a coin

When Selvo approached the city, Guiscard's ships had already anchored in the harbor at Durazzo. Though the battle was fierce, superior tactics by the skilled Venetian fleet overpowered the inexperienced Normans who were mostly used to land battles. The battered fleet led by Guiscard retreated into the harbor after losing many ships. Victorious at sea, Selvo left the fleet under the command of his son and returned to Venice a hero. Because of the help given to the Byzantine Empire, in 1082 the Republic of Venice was awarded a Golden Bull: a decree by Emperor Alexios I Komnenos granting Venice many privileges, including a tax exemption for Venetian merchants, that would be crucial for the future economic and political expansion of Venice in the eastern Mediterranean.

The defeat off the coast of Durazzo, though devastating to Guiscard's fleet, had inflicted little damage to his army as the majority of it had disembarked before the battle in preparation of the siege of Durazzo. In the coming months, Guiscard would regroup his forces and defeat a large Byzantine army led by Alexios I himself. In 1082, Guiscard took the city of Durazzo, and as the Venetian sailors were forced out of the city and their ships vacated the harbor of Durazzo, the first victory by Venice against the Norman fleet appeared just a temporary setback for the Normans. Due to the new trade privileges and the fact that virtually no damage was inflicted on the Venetians during this siege, Selvo remained very popular in Venice. Meanwhile, Guiscard advanced rapidly across the Balkan Peninsula, but his march was halted by an urgent dispatch and a call for help from his greatest ally, Pope Gregory VII. Guiscard responded by returning to Italy and marching on Rome to temporarily expel Henry IV, but in the process, he lost almost all the territories he had gained in the Balkans. Knowing that Guiscard was gone, in 1083, Selvo sent the Venetian fleet to recapture both Durazzo and the island of Corfu to the south.

=== Defeat and deposition (1084) ===
In 1084, Guiscard returned to the Balkans and planned a new offensive against Corfu, where a combined Greek-Venetian fleet, commanded by Selvo, awaited his arrival. When the Normans approached the island, the combined fleets dealt Guiscard an even greater defeat than he had received in the naval battle at Durazzo. Guiscard ordered another attack three days later, but the results were still more disastrous for the Normans. Selvo was completely convinced of his fleet's victory and sent all damaged ships north to Venice for repairs, to free them for other uses, and to report of their victory. The Doge then retired with the remaining ships to the Albanian coast to await the departure of the Normans. Acting on the Doge's belief that a third attack would be unlikely and that the presence of a slightly depleted Venetian fleet meant greater odds for victory, Guiscard summoned every floating vessel he could find and led the Normans into a surprise attack. His strategy, though perhaps risky, was ultimately well-calculated as it caused mass confusion among the Venetians, who were overwhelmed on all flanks, while the Greeks fled what they assumed to be a losing battle. Selvo barely managed to retreat with the remainder of his fleet, but not before 3,000 Venetians died and another 2,500 were taken prisoner. The Venetians also lost nine great galleys, the largest and most heavily armed ships in their fleet.

When the battered fleet returned to Venice, news of the defeat spread throughout the city to mixed reactions. Though some were willing to forgive the defeat considering the circumstances, many others needed someone to blame for the loss that was considerable not only in human and material terms, but also symbolically. The people of Venice had been humiliated by an upstart nation with practically no naval experience. Though Guiscard would die the next year and the Norman threat would quickly disappear, a scapegoat was needed at that moment. A faction of influential Venetians, possibly led by Vitale Faliero based on later writings, led a popular revolt to depose Selvo, and in December 1084 they succeeded. Selvo apparently did not make a great effort to defend himself and was sent off to a monastery. He died three years later in 1087, and was buried in the loggiato of St. Mark's Basilica. His family, the House of Selvo, is thought to have become extinct in c.1450.

== Legacy ==
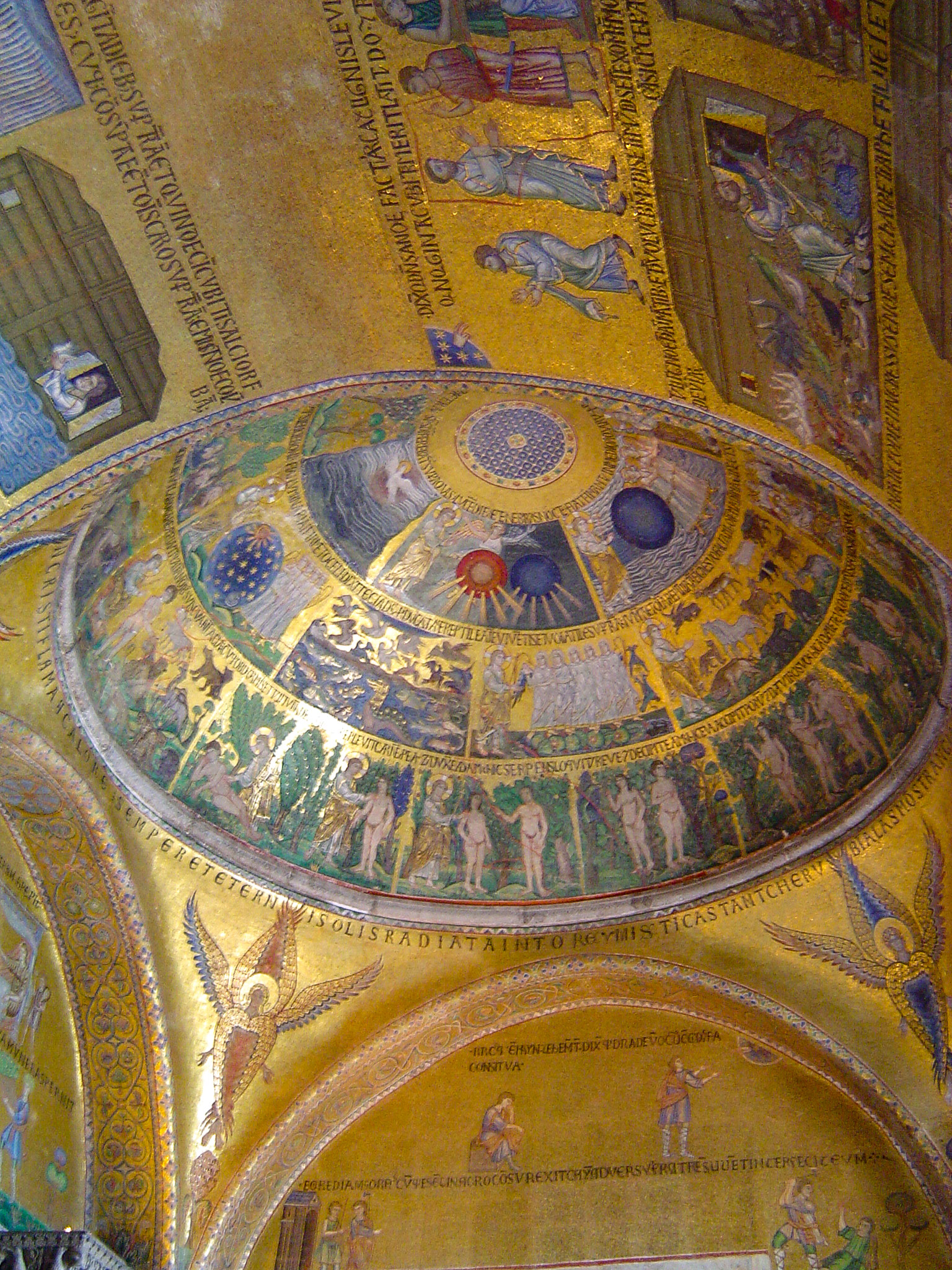
Mosaics in St Mark's Basilica were first commissioned by Domenico Selvo

After Selvo was deposed, it took several years for Venice to recover from the defeat at Corfu and for the Venetians to fully realize the immediate impact of his actions as Doge. When Venice provided military aid to the Byzantine Empire, they were awarded a Golden Bull by Emperor Alexios I that would provide the Venetians a great economic and strategic advantage throughout the eastern empire for centuries. According to the terms of the decree, annual grants were awarded to all the churches in Venice (including a special gift to the coffers of St Mark's), the Republic was granted whole sections of the Golden Horn in Constantinople, and Venetian merchants were given a full exemption from all taxes and duties throughout the territories of the Byzantine Empire. Not only did this aid the rapid economic growth of Venice in the next few centuries by giving Venetian goods a significant price advantage over other foreign goods, but it initiated a long period of artistic, cultural, and military relationships between Venice and Byzantium. This combination of eastern and western cultural influences made Venice a symbolic gateway between the east and the west in Southern Europe.

The Emperor flung open to them the gates of the Orient. On that day, Venetian world trade began.

— Charles Diehl, French Byzantinist

At the beginning of Selvo's rule, he took over responsibility for the third construction of St. Mark's Basilica. This final and most famous version of the church, whose construction was begun by Domenico Contarini and finished by Vitale Faliero in 1094, remains an important symbol of the long periods of medieval Venetian wealth and power. The church is also a monument to the great Byzantine influence on Venetian art and culture throughout its history, but particularly in the 11th century. Though Selvo did not oversee the beginning or completion of St Mark's Basilica, his rule covered a longer period of its construction than the other two Doges who oversaw the project. The Doge decreed that all Venetian merchants returning from the east had to bring back marbles or fine carvings to decorate St Mark's. The first mosaics were started in the basilica under the supervision of Selvo.

By gaining power through a vote of confidence from the people and then willingly surrendering power, Selvo, like many other Doges who underwent similar transitions, left a long-term impact on the succession process that would eventually become a model for peaceful, anti-nepotistic transitions of power in a classical republic. Although his deposition did not immediately change the system, it was one of many important changes of power in a society that was in the process of moving away from a monarchy and toward a government led by an elected official. Following the battles at Corfu, Selvo was seen by many as inept and incapable of handling the duties that a Doge must perform. His apparent squandering of nearly the entire fleet coupled with a decade-long distrust for his royal wife caused Selvo to become unpopular in Venice. By responding to the will of the people, Selvo helped shape a society that would eventually create a complicated system to check the power of its most influential members, create cooperative governmental branches that checked each other's power, and fuse the nation into a classical republic.

Domenico Selvo is depicted in the posthumous series of official portraits of the doges of Venice in the Doge's Palace. The original gallery was established in the 1360s under doge Marco Cornaro as a chronological sequence of Venetian rulers, each shown holding a scroll inscribed with a summary of his achievements. After the original paintings were destroyed in the fire of 1577, the series was recreated, with Domenico Tintoretto executing most of the surviving portraits. The scroll held by Domenico Selvo contains the following inscription in latin:

OBSESSUM REPULI GUISCARDUM MARTE ROBERTUM / DYRRACHII HINC DOMINUM ME VOCAT PRAESUL ALEXIS

[By force of arms, I repelled Robert Guiscard, who was besieging Durazzo; for this, Emperor Alexios proclaimed me lord.]

== Notes ==
Political offices
Preceded by Domenico I Contarini	Doge of Venice; 1071–1084	Succeeded by Vitale Faliero
