= Domenico Flabanico =

Doge of Venice from 1032 to 1041

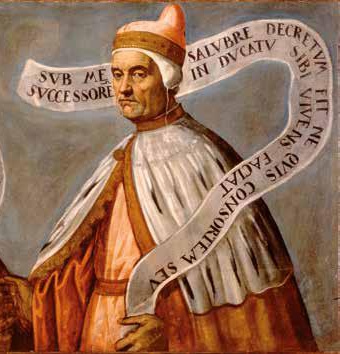
- Portrait in the Doge’s Palace

Doge of Venice
- Reign: 1032–1041
- Predecessor: Domenico Orseolo
- Successor: Domenico I Contarini
- Born: Unknown; Venice
- Died: 1041; Venice
- Burial: Disputed
- House: Flabanico

Domenico Flabanico (Sometimes spelled Flabiano, died 1041) was the Doge of Venice from 1032 until his death in 1041.

A wealthy merchant from the Flabanico family, he emerged as the leader of the opposition to the Orseolo dynasty and was involved in the deposition of doge Otto Orseolo in 1026. Following the failed attempt by the Orseolo family to regain power, Flabanico was elected doge, beginning a period of political stabilization after years of internal conflict. His tenure is traditionally associated with measures aimed at limiting the doge's authority and preventing the establishment of hereditary rule in Venice.

== Biography ==
=== Early life ===
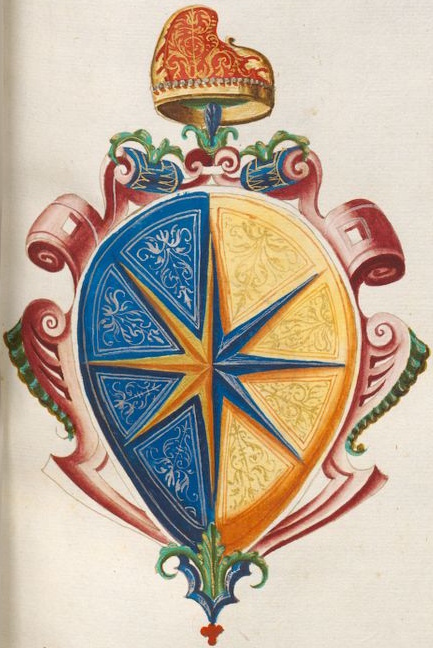
Coat of Arms of the House of Flabanico

Domenico came from one of the ancient Venetian lineages that, according to tradition, had elected the first doge, Paolo Lucio Anafesto, although little evidence of the family survives. Only a few other members of the Flabanico family are recorded between the 10th and 11th centuries, and their relationships cannot be established with certainty: a Domenico and a Giovanni Flabanico are mentioned in 960, followed by two more Giovannis in 982, another Domenico in 998 and 1024, then a Stefano, closely associated with the doge, in 1037 and 1041, who is recorded as deceased by 1084; the last known member is a Pietro, mentioned in 1064. The family is thought to have become extinct in the 13th century.

Very little is known about Domenico himself. He is thought to have been a landowner, who became a wealthy merchant trading in silk. It is also unclear whether he was married or had children.

He emerged as the leader of the faction opposed to doge Otto Orseolo and was among those responsible for his deposition in 1026. He supported the election of Pietro Barbolano, who was himself overthrown after four years as doge. Otto Orseolo was then recalled to Venice, while power was temporarily entrusted to his brother Orso. During this turbulent period, Domenico Flabanico was forced to flee or, according to another account, was expelled by Orso himself.

Otto Orseolo died before reaching Venice. In his place, his relative Domenico Orseolo was elected doge, but after ruling for only one day he was forced to flee. There was public outcry in Republic of Venice regarding the apparent onset of a nepotistic hereditary monarchy. Flabanico, being a successful merchant and a popular individual, but less than noble, was elected to spite the notion that royal blood was required for the position. Flabanico was still in exile at the time, at an unspecified location in Italy. The event is traditionally dated to 1032, although it may have occurred several months earlier, in late 1031.

=== Dogeship ===
Under Flabanico, Venice finally entered a period of stability after years of political turmoil. Although the details of his administration remain uncertain, his rule appears to have been characterized by moderation and balance, earning him the epithet prudentissimus vir ("most prudent man"). One of his most significant reforms was the limitation of the doge's powers by prohibiting the appointment of a co-ruler or designated successor, thereby preventing the office from becoming hereditary. This measure was intended to end practices that had fostered a quasi-monarchical system modeled on the Byzantine Empire. At the same time, the office of the doge would be elected along with the newly created Ducal Council. This council would ensure that the doge could not build absolute power and was seen as a balancing force against the doge.

According to tradition, the first legal proceedings against the Orseolo family began during Flabanico's reign. This account is, however, doubtful, as a man named Pietro Orseolo was recorded as still living in Rialto in 1036. A notable legal dispute from his dogeship involved the blacksmith Giovanni Sagomino and the ducal official responsible for supervising his work. The surviving documents record that Sagomino obtained permission from the doge to continue working in his own workshop rather than at the Doge's Palace. This is considered the earliest known evidence of relations between a Venetian guild and the doge.

In 1040, during Flabanico's dogeship, an important council of local bishops met at St. Mark's Basilica. It decreed that priests should not be ordained before the age of thirty, nor deacons before twenty-five, unless the metropolitan see granted special permission. The measure sought to prevent premature ordinations, partly for political reasons, notably in response to the cases of Vitale Orseolo and Domenico Gradenigo, who were made bishops before they reached adulthood. In 1041, the doge also settled a longstanding ecclesiastical dispute by ruling that jurisdiction over the church of San Trovaso belonged jointly to the Patriarch of Grado and the Bishop of Olivolo.

In foreign affairs, tensions with the Holy Roman Emperor continued. Conrad II maintained the policy of his predecessor, Henry II, by supporting the Patriarchate of Aquileia against the Patriarchate of Grado, leading to repeated conflicts with Venice. Negotiations toward peace began only after Conrad's death and the accession of Henry III. Relations with the Byzantine Empire, by contrast, appear to have improved during this period, possibly explaining Flabanico's reported, though uncertain, receipt of the Byzantine title of protospatharios.

A document dated June 1041 confirms that Flabanico had died during the first half of that year. His burial place remains uncertain: Marino Sanuto the Younger identified the Monastery of Santa Croce, while other traditions place his tomb at San Giorgio Maggiore, San Zaccaria, or leave it unknown.

== Legacy ==
Domenico Flabanico is depicted in the posthumous series of official portraits of the doges of Venice in the Doge's Palace. The original gallery was established in the 1360s under doge Marco Cornaro as a chronological sequence of Venetian rulers, each shown holding a scroll inscribed with a summary of his achievements. After the original paintings were destroyed in the fire of 1577, the series was recreated, with Domenico Tintoretto executing most of the surviving portraits. The scroll held by Domenico Flabanico contains the following inscription in latin:

SUB ME SALUBRE DECRETUM FIT NE QUIS CONSORTEM SEU SUCCESSOREM IN DUCATU SIBI VIVENS FACIAT

[Under my rule, the salutary decree was enacted that no one should, during his lifetime, make for himself a co-ruler or successor in the dogeship.]

== See also ==
- List of doges of Venice
- History of the Republic of Venice

== Sources ==
- Acemoglu, Daron (2012). Why Nations Fail. Profile. p. 153. ISBN 9781847654618.
- Rendina, Claudio (2003). I Dogi. Storia e segreti. Rome. ISBN 88-8289-656-0.

Political offices
Preceded by Domenico Orseolo	Doge of Venice; 1032–1041	Succeeded by Domenico Contarini
