= Domenico Orseolo =

Doge of Venice briefly in 1032

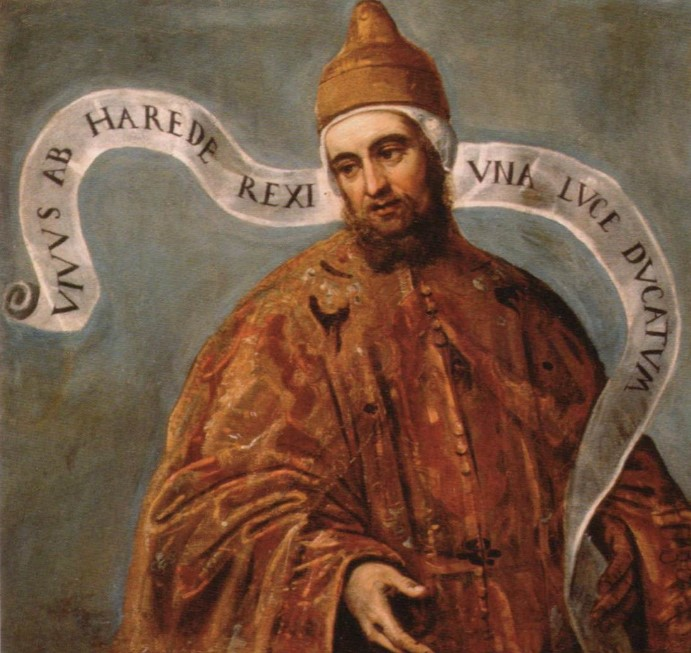
- Portrait in the Doge’s Palace

Doge of Venice (disputed)
- Reign: 1032
- Predecessor: Otto Orseolo (Under the regency of Orso Orseolo)
- Successor: Domenico Flabanico
- Born: Unknown; Venice
- Died: After 1036; Ravenna
- Issue: Pietro Orseolo; Entesema Orseolo
- House: Orseolo
- Father: Pietro II Orseolo (Possibly)
- Mother: Maria Candiano (Possibly)

Domenico Orseolo (died after 1036) was a member of the House of Orseolo and a relative of the doge Otto Orseolo and of Orso Orseolo, Patriarch of Grado and regent of the Republic of Venice.

In 1032, he was chosen by Orso to become the new Doge of Venice following the death of Otto, but after less than a day in office he was forced into exile. Because his election was regarded as illegitimate, he is generally considered a usurper rather than a legitimate doge and is therefore not included in the official numbering of the doges of Venice.

== Biography ==
The exact nature of Domenico Orseolo's relationship to the ruling Orseolo family remains uncertain. It is known, however, that in 1026 the Orseolo family, having grown excessively powerful and aroused the hostility of many political opponents, was overthrown in a revolt that brought Pietro Barbolano to power as doge of Venice. Among Domenico's relatives, the former Doge Otto Orseolo was exiled to Constantinople, while Orso Orseolo, Patriarch of Grado, and Vitale Orseolo, Bishop of Torcello, were deposed.

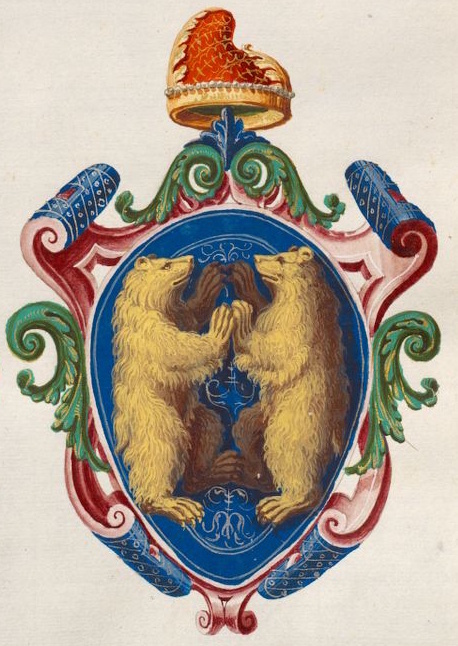
Coat of Arms of the House of Orseolo

In 1030, however, Orso seized power in a coup, restoring himself as Patriarch and assuming the regency of the duchy while awaiting Otto's return from exile.

News of Otto's death in Constantinople forced the patriarch-regent to seek another member of the family to become doge. His choice fell upon Domenico, who in 1032, with the Patriarch's backing, appeared before the Venetian popular assembly, to receive its customary approval. Instead of confirming his elevation, however, the assembly elected Domenico Flabanico, the exiled leader of the anti-Orseolo faction, as Doge.

This measure permanently excluded the Orseolo family from political power and prohibited future doges from associating a designated successor with the ducal office, thereby reaffirming the elective nature of the dogeship. It also required that the Doge be assisted by two councillors elected by the assembly, whose duty was to supervise his exercise of power.

Following his defeat, Domenico was forced to flee in exile. He is recorded as living in Ravenna in 1036.

== Family ==
A son of Domenico, named Pietro Orseolo, is mentioned as having been involved in a series of uprisings that broke out in Chioggia in 1049. The unrest was suppressed through the intervention of Doge Domenico I Contarini. Domenico is also known to have had a daughter named Entesema.

== Legacy ==
Domenico Orseolo is depicted in the posthumous series of official portraits of the doges of Venice in the Doge's Palace. The original gallery was established in the 1360s under doge Marco Cornaro as a chronological sequence of Venetian rulers, each shown holding a scroll inscribed with a summary of his achievements. After the original paintings were destroyed in the fire of 1577, the series was recreated, with Domenico Tintoretto executing most of the surviving portraits. The scroll held by Domenico Orseolo contains the following inscription in latin:

VIVUS AB HAEREDE REXI UNA LUCE DUCATUM

[The sole survivor of my lineage, I ruled the duchy for a single day.]

== See also ==
- List of doges of Venice
- Orseolo

Political offices
Preceded by Otto Orseolo	Doge of Venice; 1032	Succeeded by Domenico Flabanico
