= Orso Orseolo =

Patriarch of Grado from 1018 to 1026 and 1030 to 1049

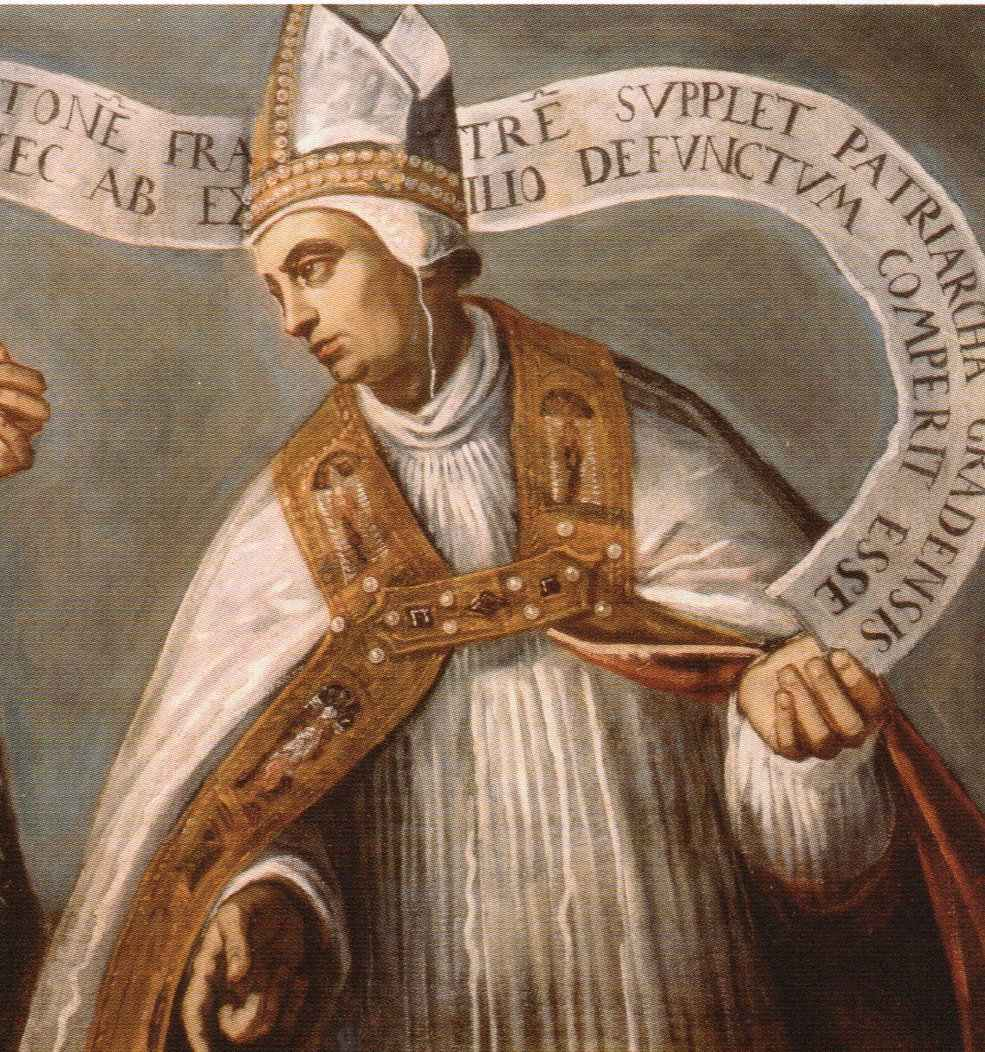
- Portrait in the Doge's Palace

Regent of Venice
- Reign: 1030–1032
- Predecessor: Pietro Barbolano
- Successor: Domenico Orseolo
- Doge: Otto Orseolo
- Born: 988; Venice
- Died: 1049; Venice
- House: Orseolo
- Father: Pietro II Orseolo
- Mother: Maria Candiano

Orso Orseolo (988−1049) was Patriarch of Grado from 1018 to 1026 and again from 1030 until his death in 1049.

A member of the powerful House of Orseolo and the brother of doge Otto Orseolo, he played a leading role in the political and ecclesiastical struggles of early 11th-century Venice, particularly the conflict between the Patriarchates of Grado and Aquileia. Following the overthrow of doge Pietro Barbolano in 1030, Orso briefly governed Venice as regent and de facto ruler while awaiting Otto's return from exile. Although he never formally became doge, medieval sources often treated him as such, and he was later included among the rulers depicted in the Doge's Palace.

== Biography ==
=== Early life ===
Orso Orseolo was born in 988 as the son of the future doge Pietro II Orseolo and his wife Maria Candiano, daughter of doge Vitale Candiano. Orso was destined for an ecclesiastical career. The Orseolo family, in fact, sought to occupy the most important positions within the Republic of Venice: among his brothers and sisters one, Otto Orseolo, became doge, while the others reached the highest offices in the most important dioceses and monasteries.

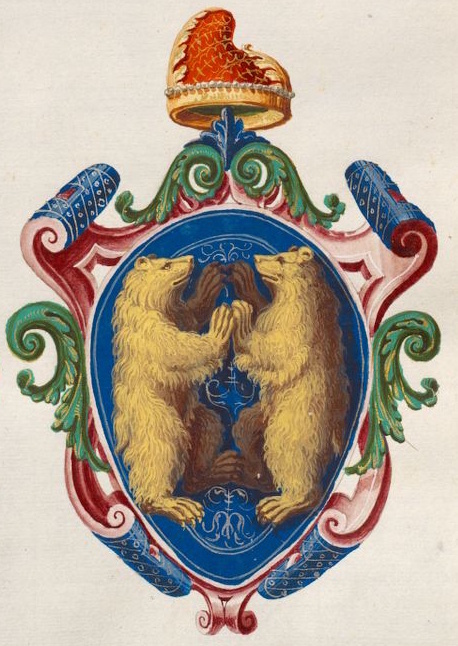
Coat of Arms of the House of Orseolo

Thus, in 1007, Orso was made bishop of Torcello by his father. His episcopate was immediately marked by considerable activity: he was responsible for restoring the cathedral of Santa Maria Assunta, perhaps in honour of his father's achievements in Dalmatia.

In 1009, he entrusted his sister Felicita, abbess of the monastery of San Giovanni Evangelista, with the relics of Saint Barbara, which had been brought from Byzantium by their brother Giovanni Orseolo, who had married Maria Argyra, a niece of Emperor Basil II. In 1011, he participated in a synod held at the St Mark's Basilica, during which new regulations were established concerning the consecration of priests and deacons.

=== Patriarch of Grado ===
In 1018, Orso was elected Patriarch of Grado, thereby becoming the metropolitan bishop of Venice. The vacant bishopric of Torcello was then entrusted to another of his brothers, the very young Vitale.

The administration of his new office was far from easy. In 1019, Emperor Henry II appointed the prominent churchman Poppo of Treffen as Patriarch of Aquileia. Supported by imperial authority, Poppo laid the foundations for the formation of the Patriarchate of Aquileia and soon began asserting claims over Grado. Since the 6th century, the two sees had competed for the role of metropolitan authority over Venetia and Istria, reflecting the long-standing rivalry between a pro-Byzantine (and therefore pro-Venetian) faction and a pro-Lombard faction, which later became aligned with the Franks.

During the Synod of Verona in 1020, Poppo accused Orso before Pope Benedict VIII of irregularities in his election as patriarch. Orso, for his part, rejected the judgment of the bishops and claimed that he had been threatened personally. For a time, his defensive strategy proved successful, but Poppo soon launched a counterattack.

At the beginning of 1024, a revolt that broke out in Venice forced both doge Otto Orseolo and the patriarch to flee to Istria. Taking advantage of their absence, Poppo invaded Grado, claiming that he intended to defend Orso's rights in his absence. According to Venetian chronicles, his troops committed severe acts of violence: they looted churches of treasures and relics, destroyed altars, desecrated tombs, assaulted nuns, and massacred monks.

These events ultimately reversed the situation in favour of the two Orseolos, who were able to return to Venice. After establishing his residence in Venice, at the church of San Silvestro (which from then on became the customary residence of the Patriarchs of Grado), Orso participated in the Lateran Synod at the end of 1024 and persuaded Pope John XIX to condemn Poppo's actions. It is noteworthy that in the document of condemnation, Poppo was referred to as Patriarch "of Friuli" rather than "of Aquileia".

The conflict, however, was far from over. In 1026, following another rebellion led by Domenico Flabanico, Otto was deposed and exiled to Constantinople. Poppo took advantage of this moment of weakness and appealed to a synod held in Rome, attended also by Emperor Conrad II. This time, the assembly ruled in his favour: Orso and Vitale were to be deprived of their titles, and the see of Grado was to be united with Aquileia, the sole metropolitan authority of the northern Adriatic.

=== Regency ===
He demonstrated his political abilities in 1030, when he succeeded in overthrowing doge Pietro Barbolano, who had succeeded his exiled brother Otto, and assumed the regency of the country while awaiting Otto's return from exile. Having already resumed control of the Patriarchate of Grado, and being a member of the clergy, Orso could not become doge himself; nevertheless, he effectively exercised the highest authority in Venice for a brief period.

Fourteen months later, however, Otto died during his journey back to Venice. Orso unsuccessfully attempted to install his relative (possibly his brother), Domenico Orseolo, as doge, but was ultimately forced to accept the rise of his political rival Domenico Flabanico to the dogeship.

=== Last years ===
From this point onwards, information about Orso becomes increasingly scarce. In 1040, he took part in a council held at St. Mark's Basilica that decreed that priests should not be ordained before the age of thirty, nor deacons before twenty-five, unless the metropolitan see granted special permission. The measure sought to prevent premature ordinations, partly for political reasons, notably in response to the cases of Vitale Orseolo and Domenico Gradenigo, who were made bishops before they reached adulthood.

In 1041 he clashed with the Bishop of Olivolo, Domenico Gradenigo, over jurisdictional rights concerning the church of San Trovaso; doge Domenico Flabanico settled the longstanding ecclesiastical dispute by ruling that jurisdiction over the church of San Trovaso belonged jointly to both. Finally, in 1042, Poppo reopened the patriarchal dispute. With the support of Emperor Henry III and Pope Benedict IX, Poppo attacked the possessions of Grado in Istria. Once again, however, Orso managed to reverse the situation in his favour: by denouncing the abuses suffered by the local population, he obtained papal recognition of his rights. Poppo was unable to respond as he suddently died the same year. Still alive in 1045, Orso probably died in 1049.

== Legacy ==
Orso Orseolo is depicted in the posthumous series of official portraits of the doges of Venice in the Doge's Palace. The original gallery was established in the 1360s under doge Marco Cornaro as a chronological sequence of Venetian rulers, each shown holding a scroll inscribed with a summary of his achievements. After the original paintings were destroyed in the fire of 1577, the series was recreated, with Domenico Tintoretto executing most of the surviving portraits. The scroll held by Orso Orseolo contains the following inscription in latin:

HOTTONEM FRATREM SUPPLET PATRIARCHA GRADENSIS / DONEC AB EXILIO DEFUNCTUM COMPERIT ESSE

[As Patriarch of Grado, I replace my brother Otto until I learn that he has died in exile.]

== See also ==
- Orseolo
- Patriarch of Grado

== Sources ==
- Mutinelli, Fabio: Lessico Veneto, tipografia Giambattista Andreola, Venezia, 1852.
- Samuele Romanin, Storia documentata di Venezia, Pietro Naratovich tipografo editore, Venezia, 1853.
- Giuseppe Gullino, Orso Orseolo, in Dizionario biografico degli italiani, vol. 79, Roma, Istituto dell'Enciclopedia Italiana, 2013
