= Domenico I Contarini =

Doge of Venice from 1041 to 1071

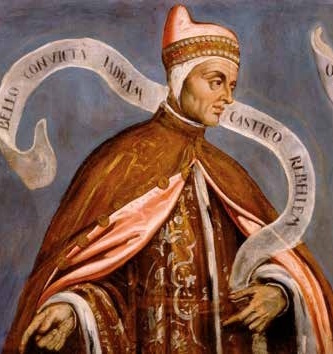
- Portrait in the Doge’s Palace

Doge of Venice
- Reign: 1041–1071
- Predecessor: Domenico Flabanico
- Successor: Domenico Selvo
- Born: Domenico Contarini; Unknown; Venice
- Died: 1071; Venice
- Burial: Church of San Nicolò al Lido
- Issue: Giovanni Contarini; Marino Contarini; Enrico Contarini
- House: Contarini
- Father: Marco Contarini

Domenico I Contarini (died 1071) was the Doge of Venice from 1041 until his death in 1071. A member of the prominent Contarini family, he succeeded doge Domenico Flabanico during a period of relative internal stability.

His long reign was marked by the definitive restoration of the Patriarchate of Grado's ecclesiastical independence from Aquileia, the reconquest of Zadar, improved relations with both the Papacy and the Byzantine Empire, the reaffirmation of Venetian commercial privileges within the Holy Roman Empire, and the reconstruction of St. Mark's Basilica in its present form.

== Biography ==
=== Early life ===
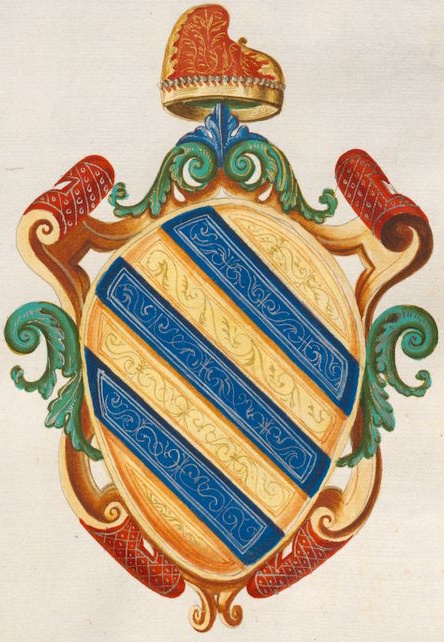
Coat of Arms of the House of Contarini

The Contarini were one of the oldest and most prominent Venetian families, whose origins were traditionally linked to the foundation of the city itself. The earliest securely documented member of the family was an Andrea Contarini, who witnessed the testament of Bishop Orso of Olivolo in 853. Over the following centuries, the Contarini expanded into numerous branches and became one of the Republic's leading patrician dynasties. Domenico, son of a Marco Contarini, was the first member of the family to be elected doge; by the fall of the Republic in 1797, the Contarini would produce a total of eight doges, more than any other Venetian family.

The name of Domenico's wife is unknown, but he is known to have had at least three sons: Giovanni, Marino, and Enrico. The latter served as Bishop of Castello from 1074 to 1108 and led a Venetian expedition to the Holy Land in 1099–1100, which returned with relics attributed to Saint Nicholas and Saint Theodore the Martyr.

=== Dogeship ===
Domenico Contarini succeeded Domenico Flabanico during the first half of 1041, although later tradition places his accession in 1043. Unlike most Venetian elections, no contemporary account survives regarding the circumstances of his elevation to the dogeship; it was probably a peaceful succession, reflecting the period of internal stability that had begun under Flabanico.

Shortly after his election, Contarini was confronted with the long-standing conflict between the Patriarchate of Grado and the Patriarchate of Aquileia, which had been reignited by the militant Patriarch Poppo of Aquileia. Although Poppo died in 1042, the dispute remained unresolved, particularly regarding the papal privilege issued by Pope John XIX in 1027, which had subordinated Grado to Aquileia. Restoring Grado's autonomy would also restore the independence of its ecclesiastical jurisdiction, which included the Republic of Venice. At the beginning of 1044, Patriarch Orso Orseolo, supported by the doge and the Venetian people, appealed once again to the pope, now Benedict IX, requesting the restoration of Grado's autonomy and the return of the property seized by Poppo. The pope fully accepted Orso's petition: a synod was convened that condemned Poppo's actions, annulled the privilege of 1027, and definitively recognized the independence of the Church of Grado. These events also marked a rapprochement between the Roman Curia and Venice.

Relations with the Byzantine Empire continued to improve during Contarini's reign. By 1046, he had been granted the honorary title of imperial patrician, followed three years later by that of archipatos. By 1064, he also became the first Venetian doge to receive the Byzantine title of magister.

The improved relations with the papacy, however, only intensified tensions with the Holy Roman Empire, then ruled by Henry III. The emperor openly maintained his hostility toward Venice by supporting its traditional adversaries. Thus, in 1047, he placed the Abbey of Sant'Ilario, an ancient monastery on the edge of the Venetian Lagoon founded by doge Agnello Participazio and traditionally subject to Venetian authority, under the jurisdiction of Rotharius II, Bishop of Treviso. In practice, however, the abbey refused to submit to the bishop, leaving unresolved the dispute over its landed estates. The controversy was eventually settled in Venice's favour. In 1052, Henry III convened an imperial court (placitum), which confirmed the abbey's possession of its estates. Shortly afterwards, the emperor also reaffirmed Venice's commercial privileges within the Empire, providing significant economic benefits.

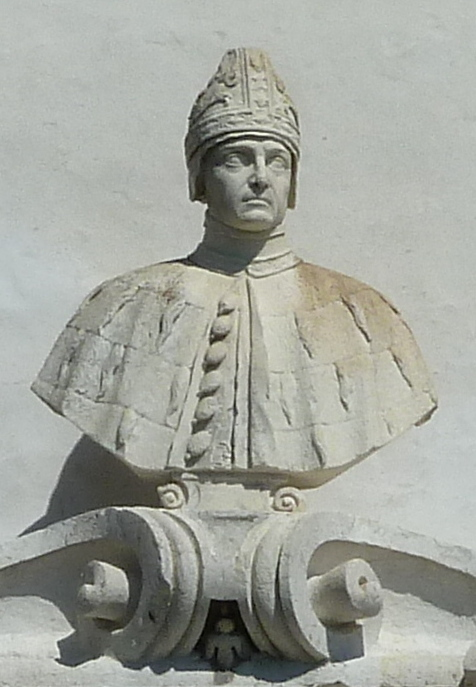
Statue of Domenico I Contarini from the façade of the Church of San Nicolò al Lido

During Contarini's reign, the Venetians recaptured Zadar (in present-day Croatia) and parts of Dalmatia that had been lost to the Kingdom of Croatia in the previous few decades. The Venetian naval fleet was heavily built up during his reign, the economy thrived, and the Republic of Venice had reasserted its control over much of the Mediterranean Sea.

Contarini died in 1071 and was buried in the Church of San Nicolò al Lido, which he had founded together with Domenico Marango, Patriarch of Grado, and Domenico Contarini, Bishop of Olivolo, possibly a relative. He is also credited with the reconstruction of St. Mark's Basilica in its present form, a project begun in 1063 that was nearly complete by the time of his death.

== Legacy ==
Domenico I Contarini is depicted in the posthumous series of official portraits of the doges of Venice in the Doge's Palace. The original gallery was established in the 1360s under doge Marco Cornaro as a chronological sequence of Venetian rulers, each shown holding a scroll inscribed with a summary of his achievements. After the original paintings were destroyed in the fire of 1577, the series was recreated, with Domenico Tintoretto executing most of the surviving portraits. The scroll held by Domenico I Contarini contains the following inscription in latin:

BELLO CONVICTAM IADRAM CASTIGO REBELLEM

[By war, I punished the rebellious and guilty Zadar.]

== See also ==
- Contarini
- List of doges of Venice

== Sources ==
- Rendina, Claudio. (2003). I Dogi. Storia e segreti. 2.ed. Rome. ISBN 88-8289-656-0

Political offices
Preceded by Domenico Flabanico	Doge of Venice; 1041–1071	Succeeded by Domenico Selvo
