= Pietro Barbolano =

Doge of Venice from 1026 to 1030

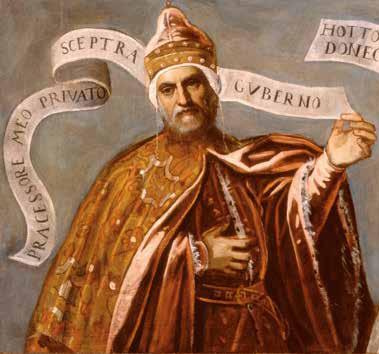
- Portrait in the Doge’s Palace

Doge of Venice
- Reign: 1026–1030
- Predecessor: Otto Orseolo
- Successor: Otto Orseolo (Under the regency of Orso Orseolo)
- Born: Unknown; Venice
- Died: After 1032; Constantinople
- House: Salamon (Founder)

Pietro Barbolano (died after 1032), also known as Pietro Centranico, was the Doge of Venice from 1026 to 1030.

He came to power after a popular revolt led by Domenico Flabanico deposed and exiled doge Otto Orseolo, whose growing nepotism and concentration of ecclesiastical offices within the Orseolo family had provoked widespread opposition. Barbolano's tenure was marked by continued political instability, the conflict with Poppo of Treffen, Patriarch of Aquileia, and renewed warfare in Dalmatia. Unable to restore stability or effectively address these challenges, he was deposed and exiled to Constantinople in 1030 during a coup led by Otto's brother Orso.

== Biography ==
=== Family background ===
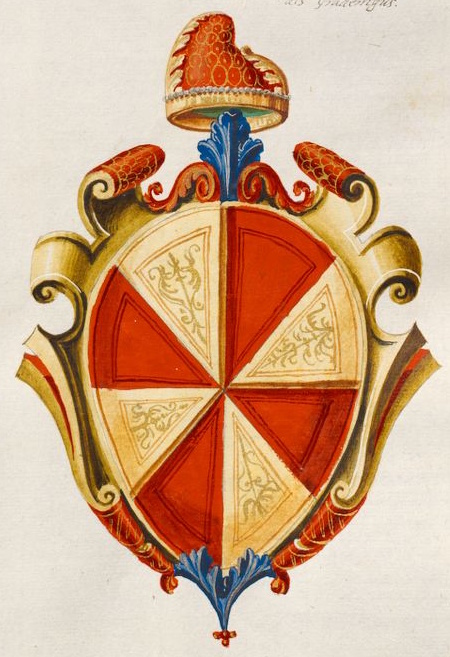
Coat of Arms of Pietro Barbolano

Little is known about Pietro's family origins. Although he did not belong to one of Venice's leading aristocratic dynasties, neither did he come from a completely obscure family. According to later tradition, the Centranico family, which originated from Torcello, was a branch of the Barbolano family, explaining the doge's double surname. Some sources further claim that Pietro adopted the surname Salamon, giving rise to the Venetian patrician family of that name.

The Barbolano–Centranico family appears only sporadically in the surviving documentary record. Its earliest known attestation dates to 982, with further isolated references in subsequent centuries. No other known member of the family is recorded as having attained high political office, making Pietro's election to the dogeship an exceptional rise for his lineage.

=== Dogeship ===
Barbolano's reign occurred during a rather difficult time in Venice. The people had spoken out against hereditary monarchy when they deposed Otto Orseolo following the scandals over nepotism. He was never fully able to win over the Venetians as he was not nearly as charismatic as the two previous doges from the Orseolo family. For the four years of his reign, he struggled to bring the city back together, but he could not.

Because the Orseolos had created so many links between their family and the hereditary ruling dynasties of Europe, various actions were taken against Venice as a retaliation for deposing Otto Orseolo. Byzantine emperor Constantine VIII, the uncle of Otto's sister-in-law Maria Argyra, withdrew the trading privileges granted to doge Pietro II Orseolo in 992, while Holy Roman Emperor Conrad II denied a renewal of Venetian commercial privileges that had been granted to them by Otto III. In the meantime, King Stephen of Hungary, whose sister Grimelda of Hungary was the wife of Otto Orseolo, attacked Dalmatia and annexed a number of cities that had been captured by doge Pietro II Orseolo.

Taking advantage of the absence from Venice of Domenico Flabanico, who had been responsible for the deposition of Otto Orseolo, Orso Orseolo, the former Patriarch of Grado and elder brother of Otto, led a coup against Pietro Barbolano in 1030. The doge was captured, humiliated by having his beard and hair cut off, and subsequently exiled to Constantinople, where he likely died.

== Legacy ==
According to a tradition first recorded by Marino Sanuto the Younger, though generally considered unreliable, Pietro Barbolano stole the relics of Saint Sabbas the Sanctified from Constantinople in 979, before his election as doge, and had them translated to the Church of Sant'Antonin in Venice.

Pietro Barbolano is depicted in the posthumous series of official portraits of the doges of Venice in the Doge's Palace. The original gallery was established in the 1360s under doge Marco Cornaro as a chronological sequence of Venetian rulers, each shown holding a scroll inscribed with a summary of his achievements. After the original paintings were destroyed in the fire of 1577, the series was recreated, with Domenico Tintoretto executing most of the surviving portraits. The scroll held by Pietro Barbolano contains the following inscription in latin:

PRÆCESSORE MEO PRIVATO SCEPTRA GUBERNO

[After my predecessor was deprived of power, I assumed the government.]

== See also ==
- List of doges of Venice
- Salamon family

== Notes ==
Political offices
Preceded by Otto Orseolo	Doge of Venice; 1026-1030	Succeeded by Otto Orseolo
