= Otto Orseolo =

Doge of Venice from 1008 to 1026 and 1030 to 1032

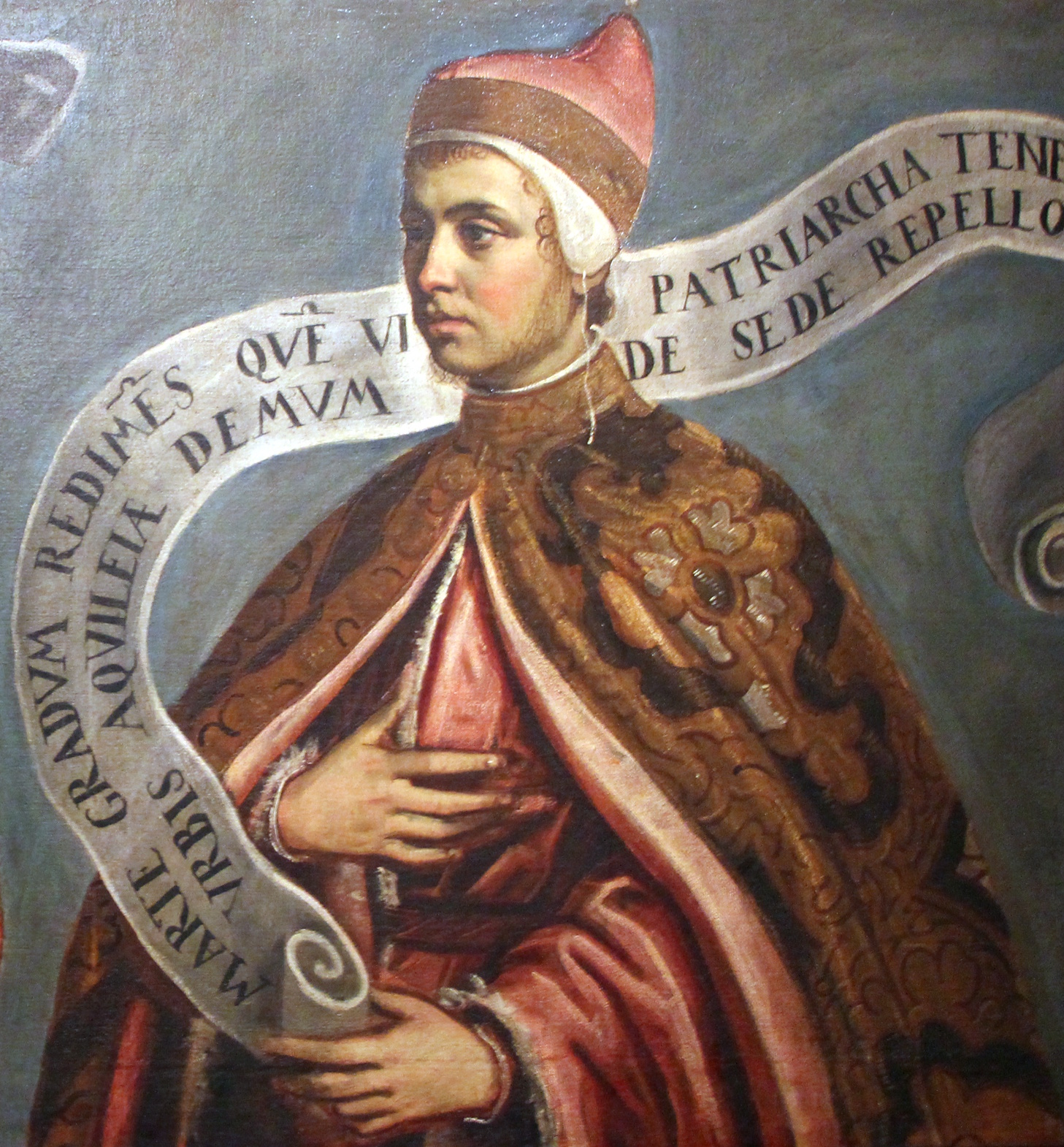
- Portrait in the Doge’s Palace

Doge of Venice
- Reign: 1009–1026
- Predecessor: Pietro II Orseolo
- Successor: Pietro Barbolano

Doge of Venice (disputed)
- Reign: 1030–1032
- Predecessor: Pietro Barbolano
- Successor: Domenico Orseolo
- Regent: Orso Orseolo

Co-doge of Venice
- Reign: 1007–1009
- Senior doge: Pietro II Orseolo
- Born: Pietro Orseolo; 993; Venice
- Died: 1032; Constantinople
- Spouse: Grimelda of Hungary
- Issue: Peter, King of Hungary; Frozza, Margravine of Austria; Felicia Orseolo; Orso Orseolo
- House: Orseolo
- Father: Pietro II Orseolo
- Mother: Maria Candiano

Otto Orseolo (Italian: Ottone Orseolo, 993−1032) born Pietro Orseolo, was the Doge of Venice from 1009 to 1026 and again from 1030 to 1032. He was the third son of doge Pietro II Orseolo and Maria Candiano, whom he succeeded at the age of sixteen, becoming the youngest doge in Venetian history.

During his dogeship, Otto strengthened the influence of the House of Orseolo within Venice and continued his father's policy of expanding Venetian authority in Dalmatia. His rule was marked by tensions with the Holy Roman Empire over the dispute between the patriarchates of Grado and Aquileia, as well as by internal opposition to his family's dominance of Venetian politics. Deposed in 1026 by a revolt led by Domenico Flabanico, Otto was banished and went into exile in Constantinople. In 1030, his brother Orso, Patriarch of Grado, overthrew doge Pietro Barbolano in a coup and assumed control of Venice as regent, recalling Otto to reclaim the dogeship. Otto, however, died on his journey back to Venice in 1032.

== Biography ==
=== Early life ===
Born in Venice in 993, he was the third son of doge Pietro II Orseolo and his wife Maria Candiano, daughter of doge Vitale Candiano. His original name was Pietro, but in 996, while Emperor Otto III was residing in Verona and granting privileges to Venice in the March of Verona, he requested that Pietro II Orseolo send his third son to Verona, where he acted as the boy's sponsor at his confirmation. In the Emperor's honour, Pietro took the name Otto. In 1004, Otto, in the company of his eldest brother and co-doge Giovanni, traveled to Constantinople, where Giovanni married the niece of Basil II, Maria Argyra, and Otto received several honorific titles.

After Giovanni's sudden death in 1007, Pietro raised Otto to the dogeship with him. Pietro himself died soon afterward. He bequeathed his possessions to the poor and to the clergy and left Otto sole doge at the meager age of sixteen.

=== Dogeship ===
Soon after the death of his father, in 1009, Otto married Grimelda, a daughter of the newly Christian Géza of Hungary and Adelaide. Because the Chronicon Venetum of John the Deacon ends in Otto's reign, it is necessary to rely on later chronicles. According to the chronicler (and doge) Andrea Dandolo, writing from a vantage point three centuries ahead, Otto was:

Catholic in faith, calm in purity, strong in justice, eminent in religion, decorous in his manner of life, well-endowed with wealth and possessions, and so filled with all forms of virtue that he was universally considered to be the most fitting successor of his father and grandfather.

Scandal marked much of Otto's reign, as he showed a clear inclination toward nepotism with the elevation of several relatives to positions of power. In 1017 Vitale IV Candiano, Patriarch of Grado, died. Otto appointed his elder brother (Pietro's second son), Orso Orseolo, already Bishop of Torcello, to the vacant patriarchate. Otto then filled the vacant Torcello with his younger brother Vitale Orseolo. These actions lost him the support of the people, though they did not yet clamour for his removal from office. The denunciations of Poppo of Treffen, the Patriarch of Aquileia, incited the Venetians to expel Otto and the patriarch of Grado from Venice, whence they took refuge in Istria from 1022 to 1023. But in that latter year, Poppo sacked the patriarchal palace and church in Grado and the Venetians recalled Otto and Orso. In 1024, Pope John XIX confirmed Orso's right to hold Grado and confirmed the patriarchal rights of his see vis-à-vis Aquileia. However, Otto continued to use church appointments to his own personal and familial advantage and the enemies of the Orseolo in Venice, with popular support, moved to depose him in 1026. The group of rebels, led by Domenico Flabanico, imprisoned the doge and, after cutting off his beard as a sign of humiliation, exiled him, replacing him with Pietro Barbolano. Otto's brothers Orso and Vitale were deposed as well.

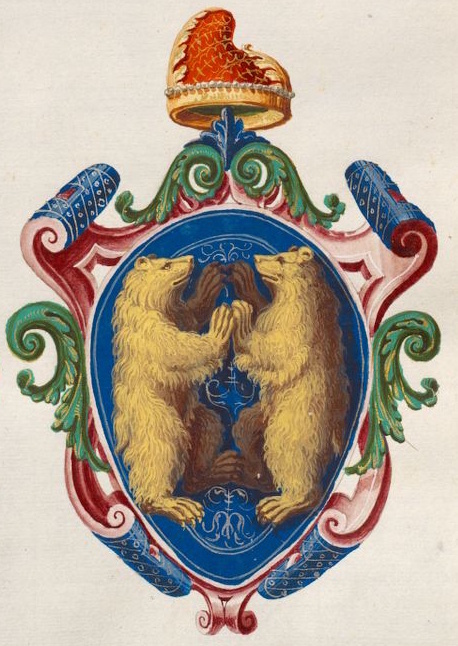
Coat of Arms of the House of Orseolo

Otto found refuge in Constantinople, while his son Pietro sought shelter at the court of his uncle, King Stephen of Hungary. There he was well received by Constantine VIII, the uncle of his sister-in-law Maria Argyra, who repealed trade privileges previously granted to the Republic under Pietro II Orseolo. Not for nothing had Otto built up a good rapport with the emperors of Europe: the Holy Roman Emperor Conrad II likewise revoked Venetian trade privileges in response to his deposition. Stephen I of Croatia, at the instigation of Otto's son Pietro, attacked the coastal cities of Dalmatia, capturing several from Venice.

=== Death in exile ===
In 1030, Pietro Barbolano's inability to deal with the conflict spreading in Dalmatia and the continued hostility of Patriarch Poppo of Treffen weakened his position and facilitated another change of government. The initiative was taken by Orso, who proved to be a more capable and determined figure than his brother Otto. Pietro Barbolano was deposed in a coup and exiled, while Otto was elected doge again, with Orso becoming regent in the interim. Vitale then went to Constantinople to seek out Otto to come back from exile and reassume the ducal throne. However, Otto never reached Venice again, as he died during his journey back in the spring of 1032.

News of Otto's death forced Orso to seek another member of the family to become doge. His choice fell upon Domenico Orseolo, who in 1032, with the Patriarch's backing, appeared before the Venetian popular assembly, to receive its customary approval. Instead of confirming his elevation, however, the assembly elected Domenico Flabanico, the exiled leader of the anti-Orseolo faction, as the new doge.

== Family ==
Otto Orseolo had at least three children with his wife Grimelda of Hungary:

- Pietro Orseolo, succeeded his uncle Stephen as King of Hungary.
- Frozza Orseolo, became Margravine of Austria by marriage to Adalbert, Margrave of Austria.
- Felicia Orseolo (sometimes spelled Felicita), married to Nicolò Bembo, a member of the House of Bembo. Their daughter Elena Bembo married to Giovanni Vitale Michiel, son of Vitale Michiel of the House of Michiel, and Felicia Elena Cornaro, member of the House of Cornaro. Their son Domenico Michiel became the 35th Doge of Venice.

Some sources suggest that Otto may have had another son, Orso, though this remains unclear.

== Legacy ==
Otto Orseolo is depicted in the posthumous series of official portraits of the doges of Venice in the Doge's Palace. The original gallery was established in the 1360s under doge Marco Cornaro as a chronological sequence of Venetian rulers, each shown holding a scroll inscribed with a summary of his achievements. After the original paintings were destroyed in the fire of 1577, the series was recreated, with Domenico Tintoretto executing most of the surviving portraits. The scroll held by Otto Orseolo contains the following inscription in latin:

MARTE GRADUM REDIMENS QUEM VI PATRIARCHA TENEBAT / URBIS AQUILEIÆ DEMUM DE SEDE REPELLOR

[By war I recovered Grado, which the Patriarch of Aquileia had seized by force; yet I was ultimately expelled from the throne.]

== See also ==
- List of doges of Venice
- Orseolo

== Sources ==
- Hazlitt, W. Carew. (1915). The Venetian Republic: Its Rise, its Growth, and its Fall. A.D. 409–1797. London: Adam and Charles Black. LOC DG676 .H43
- McClellan, George B. (1904). The Oligarchy of Venice. Boston and New York: Houghton, Mifflin and Company. LOC DG677 .M13
- Norwich, John Julius. (1982). A History of Venice. New York: Alfred A. Knopf.
- Staley, Edgcumbe. (1910). The Dogaressas of Venice (The Wives of the Doges). London: T. W. Laurie.

Political offices
Preceded by Pietro II Orseolo	Doge of Venice; 1008–1026	Succeeded by Pietro Barbolano
Preceded by Pietro Barbolano	Doge of Venice; 1030–1032	Succeeded by Domenico Orseolo
