= San Trovaso =

Church building in Venice, Italy

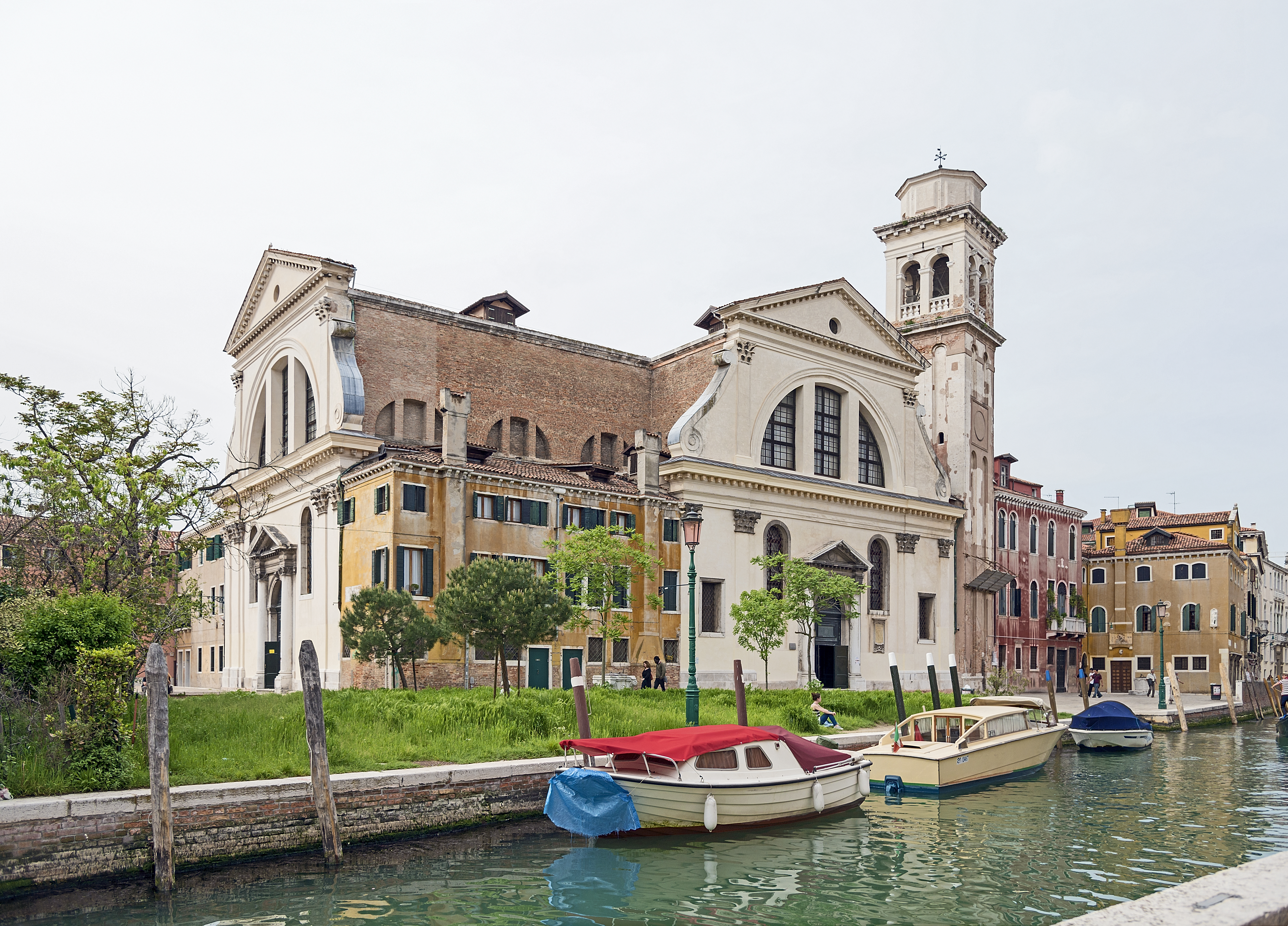
- San Trovaso with two facades

- Location within Venice Location within Italy

Religion
- Affiliation: Roman Catholic
- Province: Venice

Location
- Location: Venice, Italy
- Interactive map of San Trovaso
- Coordinates: 45.4308°N 12.326°E

Architecture
- Completed: 1028

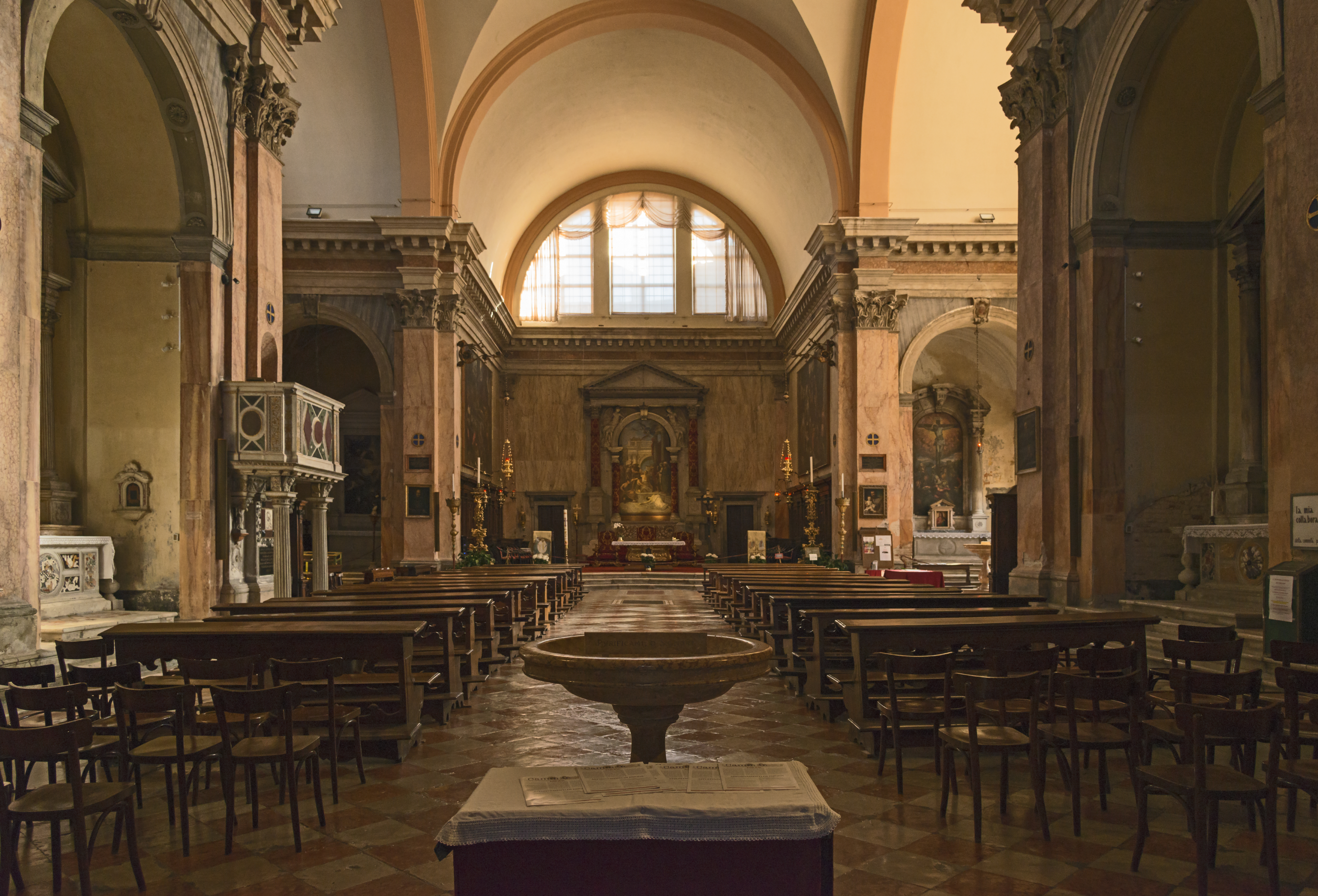
Interior of San Trovaso

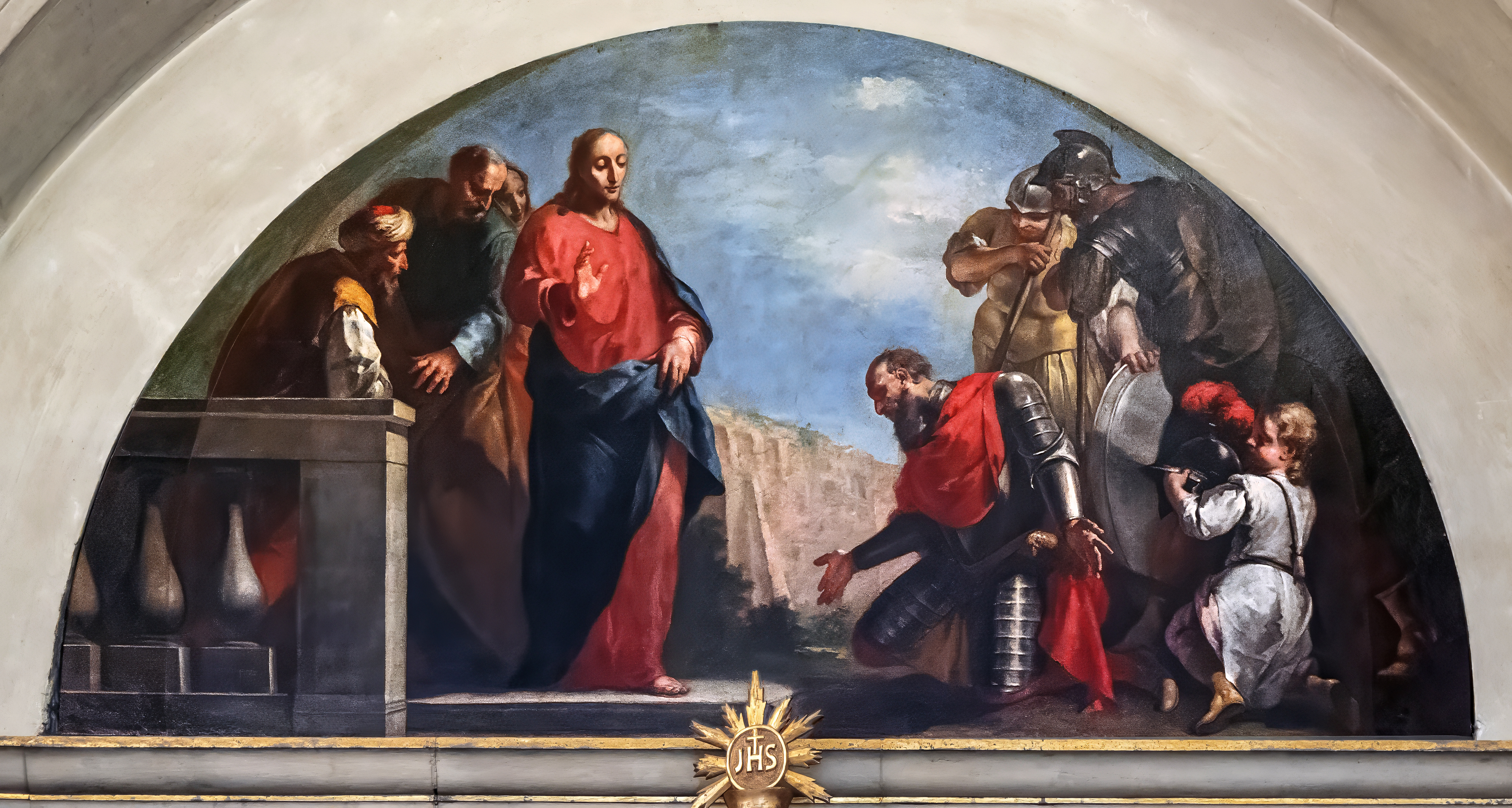
Francesco Polazzo: Christ and the Centurion

San Trovaso (dedicated to Saints Gervasius and Protasius, of which Trovaso is a vernacular contraction) is a church in the sestiere or neighborhood of Dorsoduro in Venice, northern Italy.

The church dates to at least the 1028. The present church was rebuilt by 1584. The architect was probably Francesco Smeraldi. The church was consecrated in 1637.

In the chancel are two canvases, Adoration of the Magi and Expulsion of Joachim from the Temple (before 1587) by Domenico Tintoretto, brought here from the church of Santa Maria Maggiore. The left rear chapel, commissioned by Antonio Milledonne, has a Temptations of Saint Anthony Abbot by Jacopo Tintoretto. In addition the St. Chrysogonus on Horseback (c. 1444) was painted by Michele Giambono. The Cappella del Santissimo Sacramento has a Last Supper by the elder Tintoretto companied by a copy of Christ washing the feet of the disciples by the same painter. The original is now housed in the National Gallery in London. The Last Supper is shown on the Expo 2015, in the pavilion of the Vatican City. The second chapel to the right has a Madonna and child in Glory by Palma il Giovane.
