= Pietro II Orseolo =

Doge of Venice from 991 to 1009

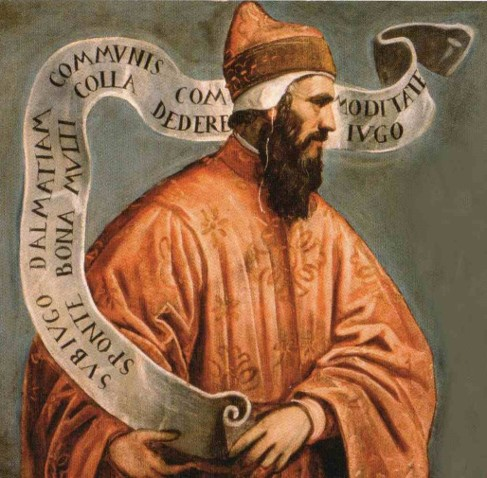
- Portrait in the Doge’s Palace

Doge of Venice
- Reign: 991–1009
- Predecessor: Tribuno Memmo
- Successor: Otto Orseolo
- Co-doges: Giovanni Orseolo (1002–1007); Otto Orseolo (1007–1009)
- Born: Pietro Orseolo; 961; Venice
- Died: 1009 (aged 48); Venice
- Burial: Church of San Zaccaria
- Spouse: Maria Candiano
- Issue Detail: Giovanni Orseolo; Orso Orseolo, Patriarch of Grado; Otto Orseolo, Doge of Venice; Vitale Orseolo, Bishop of Torcello; Domenico Orseolo; Enrico Orseolo; Hicela Orseolo; Felicita Orseolo; Two other daughters
Regnal name
- Pietro II Orseolo
- House: Orseolo
- Father: Pietro I Orseolo
- Mother: Felicia Malipiero

Pietro II Orseolo (961−1009) was the Doge of Venice from 991 to 1009, and a member of the House of Orseolo. He began the period of eastern expansion of Venice that lasted for the better part of 500 years. He secured his influence in the Dalmatian Romanized settlements against two Slavic peoples, the Croats and the Narentines, freed Venice from a 50-year-old taxation to the latter, and started Venice's expansions by conquering the islands of Lastovo (Lagosta) and Korčula (Curzola) and acquiring Dubrovnik (Ragusa).

These actions marked the beginning of the Stato da Màr, Venice's overseas dominion, and laid the foundation for its maritime empire. Because of these achievements, he is sometimes referred to as "the Great doge".

== Biography ==
=== Early life ===
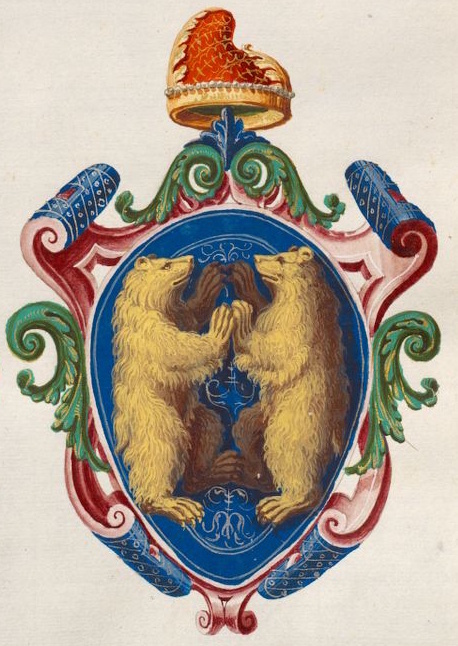
Coat of Arms of the House of Orseolo

Born in Venice in 961, He was the only son of doge Pietro I Orseolo and Felicia Malipiero. In 976, his father had ascended to the dogeship, but after only two years he relinquished the office to retire to the Abbey of Saint-Michel-de-Cuxa. He first appears in the historical record on 20 December 982, as one of the witnesses to the charter donating the island of San Giorgio Maggiore to the Benedictine monks for the foundation of a monastery.

=== Dogeship ===
In 991, he was elected Doge, succeeding Tribuno Memmo, who had been forced to abdicate amid violent clashes between the Coloprini and Morosini families.

Pietro's rule began under highly favorable circumstances. During the first months of his government, he secured the support of the major foreign powers, ensuring both political stability and economic prosperity for Venice. In particular, he concluded a treaty with the Byzantine emperors Basil II and Constantine VIII, agreeing to transport Byzantine troops in exchange for a golden bull that granted Venetian merchants extensive commercial privileges in Constantinople. Similar rights were confirmed by the Emperor Otto III in a diploma issued on July 19, 992. Pietro also concluded agreements with the mainland bishoprics of Treviso, Ceneda, and Belluno.

=== War in Dalmatia ===
Following repeated complaints by the Dalmatian city-states in 997, the Venetian fleet under Pietro attacked the Neretvian pirates of Neretva (Narentines) on Ascension Day in 998. Pietro then took the title of Dux Dalmatianorum (Duke of the Dalmatians), associating it with his son Giovanni Orseolo.

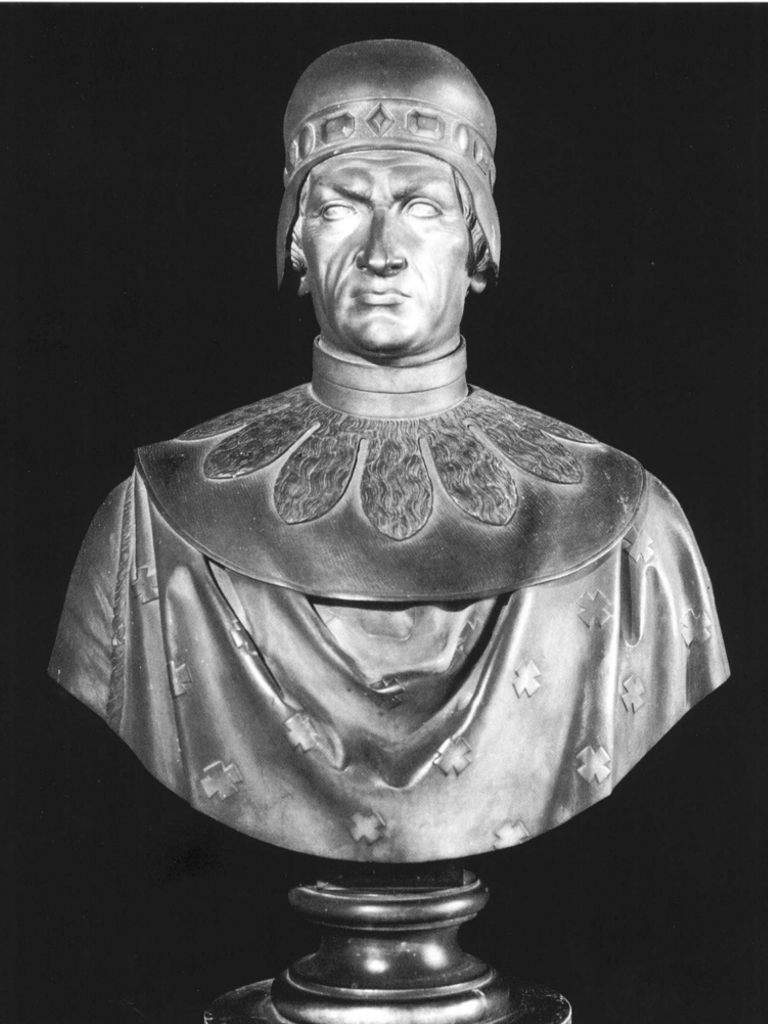
Portrait bust of Pietro II Orseolo by Pietro Bearzi (1860-1862)

On 9 May 1000 Pietro decided to finally pacify the Croatians and the Narentines during the last Croatian-Bulgarian wars, protecting Venetian trade colonies and the interests of Romanized Dalmatians. Without difficulties, his fleet of six ships scorched the entire eastern half of the Adriatic coast, with only the Neretvians offering resistance. After the Neretvians stole goods and captured forty traders from Zadar, the Doge dispatched ten ships that caught the Neretvians near the island of Kača. He captured them all and brought them triumphantly to Split. There, Neretvian emissaries requested the release of the prisoners. Pietro agreed provided that the Neretvian Archont himself agreed to bow before him. Moreover, the Neretvians would also have to renounce the old tax that Venetia had to pay since 948, and guarantee safe passage to Venetian ships in the Adriatic.

Pietro released all prisoners except for six Narentines, whom he kept as hostages. The mainland Narentines were thus pacified; the citizens of Korčula decided to wage war against Pietro, but were eventually conquered. Lastovo however, continued to resist Venetian incursions. The island was infamous for being a pirate haven. In the effort to decisively quell further opposition, Orserolo ordered the evacuation of the island city. Despite continuing opposition, he eventually razed Lastovo to the ground.

At the same time that Pietro subjugated Lastovo, the former Croatian king Svetoslav Suronja fled to Venice after being deposed by his two brothers. To bolster his weakened position, King Stephen I of Croatia married Pietro's daughter, Joscella (Hicela) Orseolo. Their son Peter Krešimir IV became king in Croatia in 1059.

=== Death and succession ===
In 1002, Pietro appointed his young son Giovanni as co-doge. That same year, or possibly in 1003, he led a fleet of one hundred ships to relieve the city of Bari, which had been under siege by the Saracens for several months. The expedition, undertaken with the approval of Emperor Basil II, was a success. The alliance with the Byzantine Empire was further strengthened by the marriage of Giovanni to Maria Argyra, a cousin of the emperor. The birth of their son, named Basil in honor of Emperor Basil II, promised to enhance Pietro's political position. However, in 1007, Giovanni, Maria and Basil all died in an outbreak of plague. Pietro then appointed his third son, Otto, as co-doge.

Pietro himself died soon afterward. He bequeathed his possessions to the poor and to the clergy and was buried beside Giovanni in the Church of San Zaccaria.

== Family ==
Pietro II Orseolo had ten children (six sons and four daughters) with is wife Maria Candiano, daughter of doge Vitale Candiano and niece of doge Pietro IV Candiano, including:

- Giovanni Orseolo, co-doge of Venice; predeceased his father; associated with his father in the dogeship from 1002 until his death in 1007.
- Orso Orseolo, later Patriarch of Grado.
- Otto Orseolo, succeeded his father as doge of Venice in 1009; associated with his father in the dogeship since 1007.
- Vitale Orseolo, later Bishop of Torcello.
- Domenico Orseolo; Possibly the same Domenico Orseolo that became doge briefly in 1032.
- Enrico Orseolo, sponsored at baptism by Henry II, Holy Roman Emperor.
- Hicela Orseolo, married Stephen I of Croatia and was mother of Peter Krešimir IV
- Felicita Orseolo, became abbess of the monastery of San Giovanni Evangelista at Torcello (Abandoned in 1810).
- Two other daughters, whose names are not recorded, both became nuns.

== Legacy ==
The date of his victory became that of the Festa della Sensa, the Ascension Festival, the oldest festival in Venice. It was commemorated by the Doge and the bishop of Olivolo going past the Lido and blessing the waters, invoking good fortune for the Venetian navy.

A bust of Pietro II Orseolo is included in the Panteon Veneto, a 19th-century collection honoring prominent figures from Venetian history, created in 1847 by the Venetian Institute of Sciences, Literature and Arts.

Pietro II Orseolo is depicted in the posthumous series of official portraits of the doges of Venice in the Doge's Palace. The original gallery was established in the 1360s under doge Marco Cornaro as a chronological sequence of Venetian rulers, each shown holding a scroll inscribed with a summary of his achievements. After the original paintings were destroyed in the fire of 1577, the series was recreated, with Domenico Tintoretto executing most of the surviving portraits. The scroll held by Pietro II Orseolo contains the following inscription in latin:

SUBIUGO DALMATIAM COMMUNIS COMMODITATE / SPONTE BONA MULTI COLLA DEDERE IUGO

[I subjugate Dalmatia for the common good; many willingly submitted their necks to the yoke.]

== See also ==
- List of doges of Venice
- Orseolo

Political offices
Preceded by Tribuno Memmo	Doge of Venice; 991–1009	Succeeded by Otto Orseolo
