= Orseolo =

Coat of Arms of the House of Orseolo

The House of Orseolo (Italian: [orˈsɛolo]) was a powerful Venetian noble family descended from Orso Ipato and his son Teodato Ipato, the first Doges of Venice. Four members of the Orseolo family became Doges, Commander of the Venetian fleet, and King of Hungary. They reconstructed St Mark's Basilica and the Doge's Palace after the revolution.

== Notable members ==
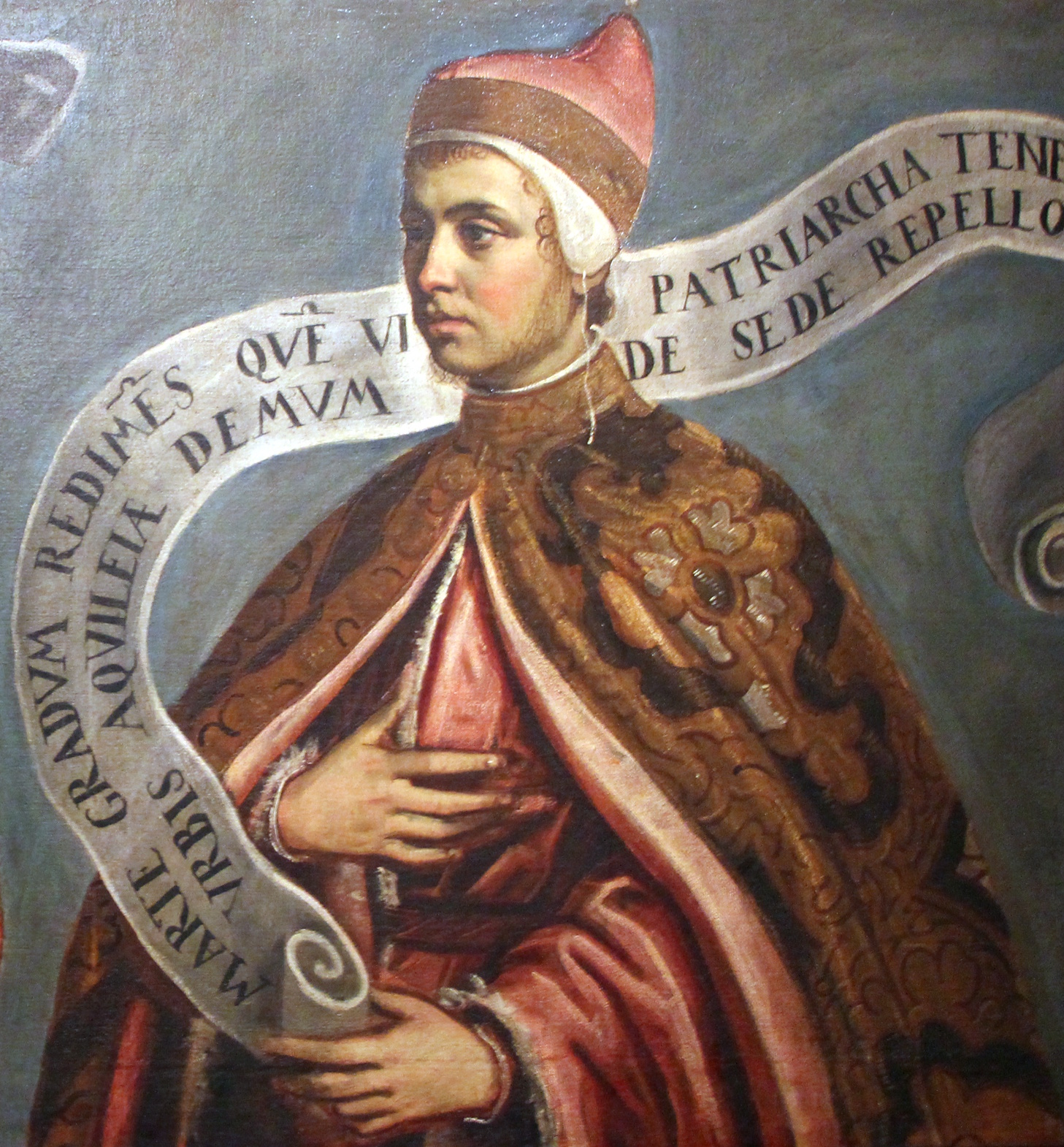
Doge Otto Orseolo, died in exile in Constantinople. He was the godson of Otto III, Holy Roman Emperor

- Pietro I Orseolo (c. 928–987) acted as ambassador to the Holy Roman Emperor Otto I before he was elected doge in August 976. Just previous to this event part of Venice had been burned down and Pietro began the rebuilding of St. Mark's Basilica and the Doge's Palace. He is chiefly celebrated, however, for his piety and his generosity, and after holding office for two years he left Venice secretly and retired to a monastery in the Pyrénées-Orientales, France, where he passed his remaining days. He was canonized in 1731.
- Pietro II Orseolo (died 1009), a son of Pietro I Orseolo, was himself elected to this office in 991. He was a great builder, but his chief work was to crush the pirates of the Adriatic Sea and to bring a long stretch of the Dalmatian coast under the rule of Venice, thus relieving the commerce of the republic from a great and pressing danger. The fleet which achieved this result was led by the doge in person; it sailed on Ascension Day, 9 May 1000, and its progress was attended with uninterrupted success. In honor of this victory the Venetians instituted the ceremony which afterwards grew into the sposalizio del mar, or Marriage of the Sea, and which was celebrated each year on Ascension Day, while the doge added to his title that of duke of Dalmatia. In many other ways Pietro's services to the state were considerable, and he may be said to be one of the chief founders of the commercial greatness of Venice. The doge was on very friendly terms with the emperor Otto III and also with the emperors at Constantinople, and in 1003 he sailed against the Saracens and compelled them to raise the siege of Bari. In 1003 his son Giovanni was associated with him in the dogeship, and on Giovanni's death in 1007 another son, Ottone, succeeded to this position. His daughter Hicela married king Stephen I of Croatia and was Queen consort of Croatia, while his grandson Peter Krešimir IV became King of Croatia and Dalmatia.
- Otto Orseolo (died 1032), whose godfather was the emperor Otto III, became sole doge on his father's death in 1009. He married a sister of King Stephen I of Hungary, and under his rule Venice was powerful and prosperous. One of his brothers, Orso, was patriarch of Grado; another, Vitalis, was bishop of Torcello, but the growing wealth and influence of the Orseolo family soon filled the Venetians with alarm. About 1024 Ottone and Orso were driven from Venice, but when Orso's rival, Poppo, Patriarch of Aquileia, seized Grado, the exiled doge and his brother was recalled and Grado was recovered. In 1026 Ottone was banished; he found a refuge in Constantinople, where he remained until his death, although in 1030 an embassy invited him to return to Venice, where his brother Orso acted as agent for fourteen months. Orso remained patriarch of Grado until his death in 1045, and another member of the Orseolo family, Domenico, was doge for a single day in 1031. After the fall of the Orseoli the Venetians decreed that no doge should name his successor, or associate any one with him in the dogeship. Ottone's son, Pietro the Venetian, was King of Hungary for some time after the death of his uncle, St. Stephen, in 1038.
- Peter Orseolo, King of Hungary, succeeded his uncle Stephen I of Hungary of the Árpád dynasty. He was the nephew of Henry II, Holy Roman Emperor, and a great-grandson of Gyula of Transylvania. He was known for his active foreign policy and for having invaded Bavaria and Bohemia. He was forced to exile in Austria but later restored as King of Hungary by Emperor Henry III.
- Frozza Orseolo, daughter of Doge Otto Orseolo, was married to Adalbert, Margrave of Austria, member of the House of Babenberg. Their son Ernest married to Adelaide of Eilenburg, member of the House of Wettin.
- Giovanni Orseolo, Duke of Dalmatia, made an alliance with the Byzantine Emperor Basil II and became co-doge of Venice. He was married to Maria Argyropoulina, of the House of Argyros; a family of Roman Emperors of the Eastern Roman Empire.

See Kohlschütter, Venedig unter dem Herzog Peter II. Orseolo (Göttingen, 1868); H. F. Brown, Venice (1895); F. C. Hodgson, The Early History of Venice (1901); and W. C. Hazlitt, The Venetian Republic (1900).
