= Domenico Tintoretto =

Italian painter (1560–1635)

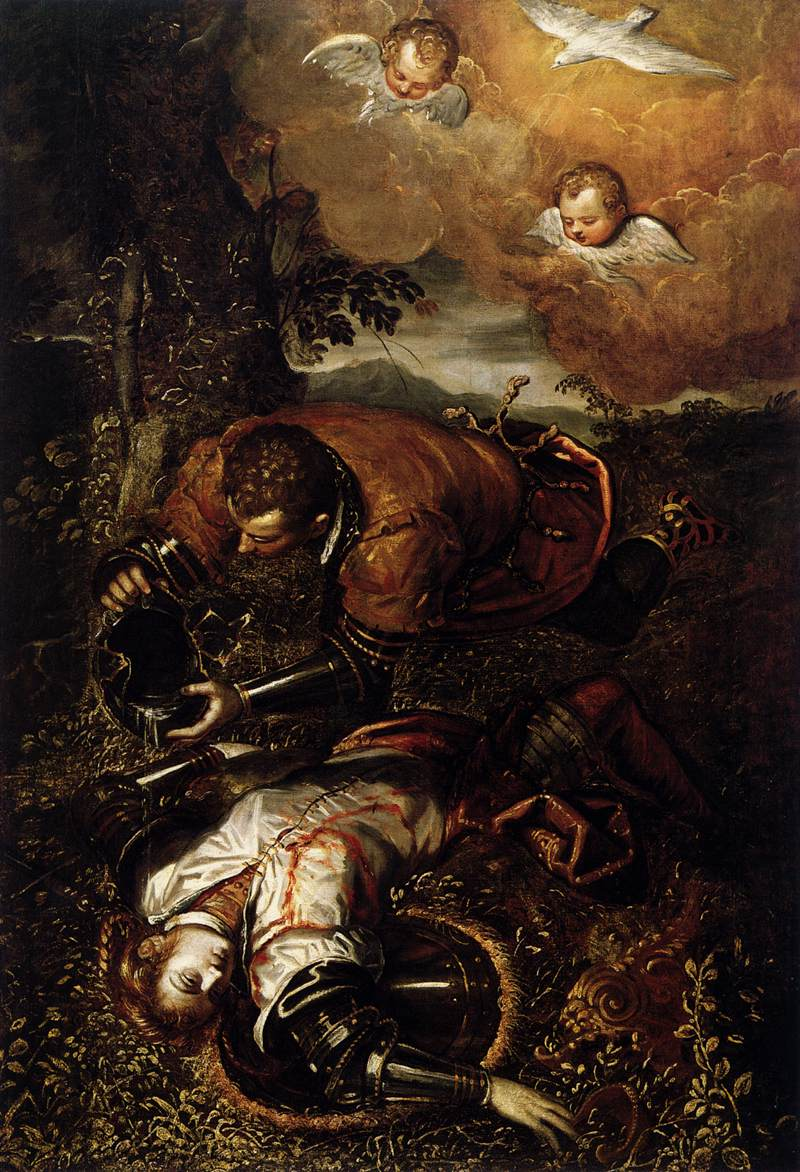
Domenico Tintoretto, Tancred Baptizing Clorinda, Museum of Fine Arts (Houston), 1585

Domenico Robusti, also known as Domenico Tintoretto (1560 – 17 May 1635), was an Italian painter from Venice. He grew up under the tutelage of his father, the renowned painter Jacopo Tintoretto.

== Life ==
=== Apprenticeship ===
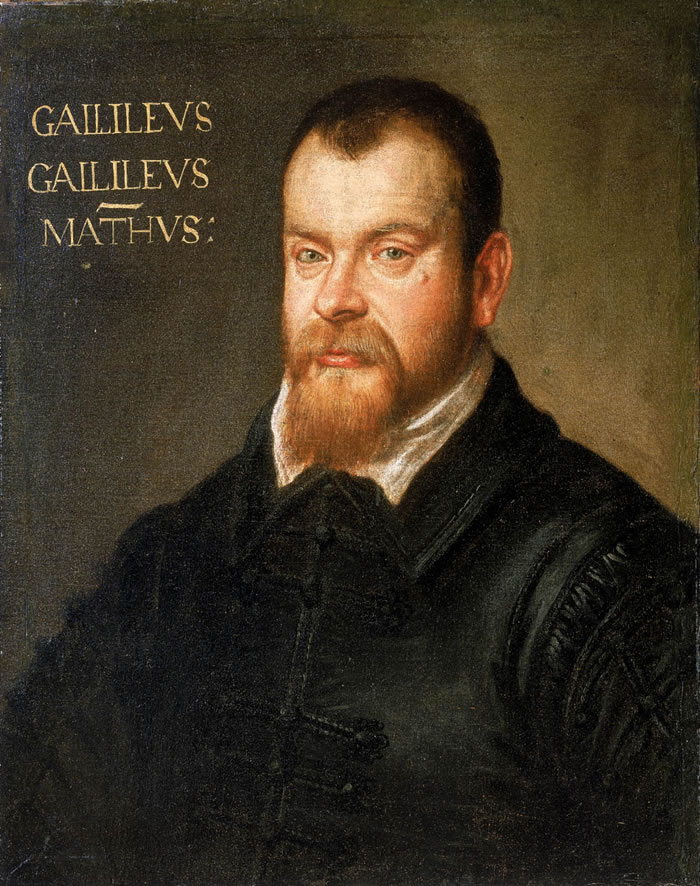
Portrait of Galileo Galilei, National Maritime Museum, 1605–1607

Domenico was born in Venice, Jacopo Tintoretto's oldest son. At age 17, he became a member of the Venetian painter's guild and, to further his training, worked alongside his father executing paintings in the Doge's Palace in Venice. Domenico then began to work independently in the palace, focusing his work on historical themes, including complex arrangements of multiple figures in battle scenes. But throughout his life, Domenico also painted several religious commissions. Some of his celebrated altarpieces include St. George Killing the Dragon in San Giorgio Maggiore, the Translation of the Body of St. Mark to Venice in the Scuola Grande di San Marco, An Apparition of St. Mark in St Mark's Basilica, and altarpieces in Modena and Rimini. Of further note are Domenico's murals in the Doge's Palace and the Scuola Grande di San Giovanni Evangelista, and the Plague of Venice in San Francesco della Vigna.

=== Portraiture ===
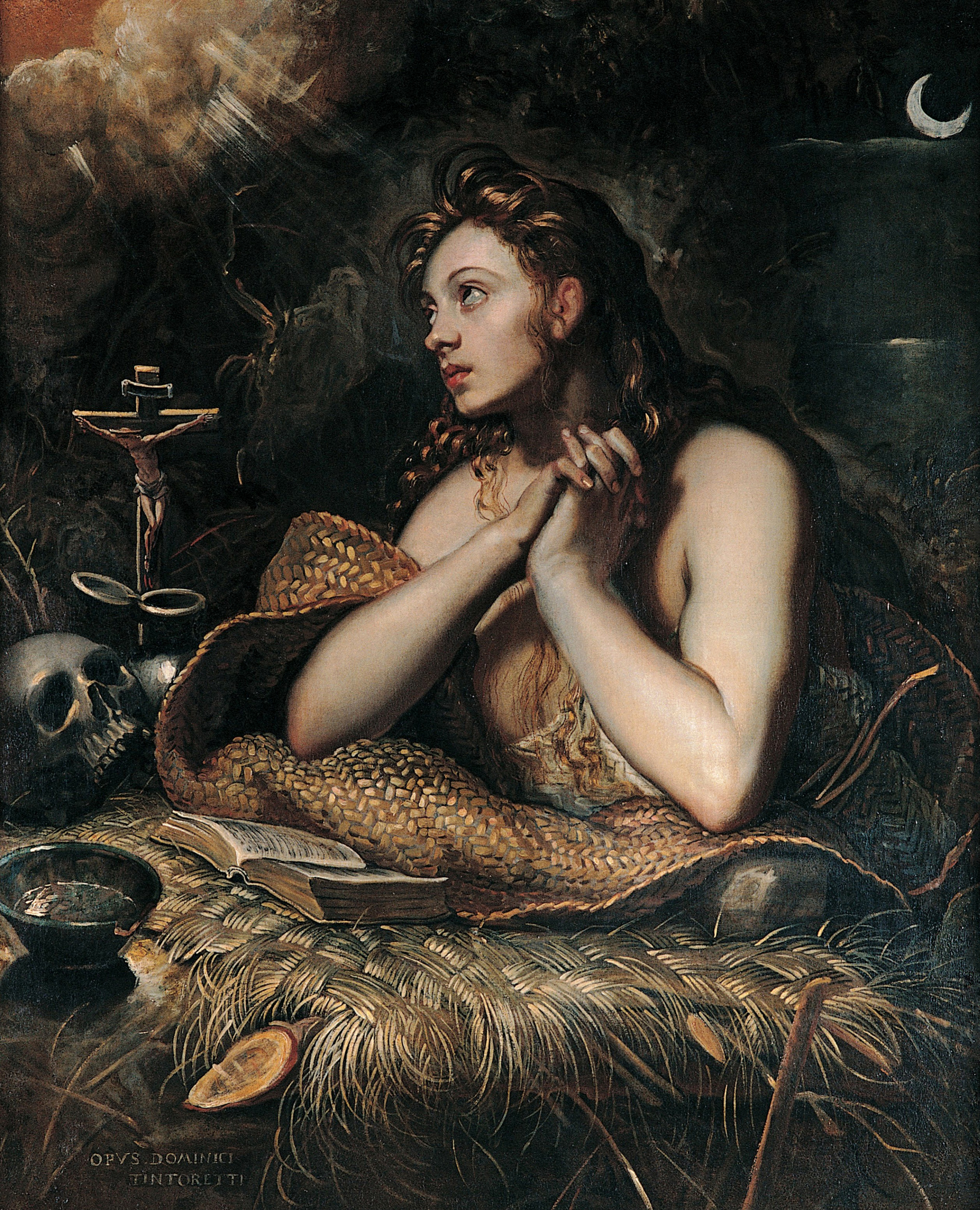
Penitent Magdalene

It is argued that Domenico's greatest contribution to the history of painting resides in his portraiture. Domenico painted Margaret of Austria who became Queen of Spain through her marriage to Philip III. Other commissioned portraits include the Duchess Margarita, the widow of Duke Alfonso II of Ferrara, the Doge Pasquale Cicogna, Doge Marino Grimani, Marcantonio Memmo, Giovanni Bembo, Luigi d'Este, the Count d’Aron and Vincenzo Gonzaga, Duke of Mantua. According to Carlo Ridolfi and the evidence of surviving portraits such as that of Sir John Finet, future Master of Ceremonies to Charles I, he painted many English visitors to Venice, including the Collector Earl of Arundel and his wife and children.

=== Individual style ===
When Jacopo died in 1594, Domenico handily took over the running of the studio of Tintoretto, with the help of his younger brother Marco, and his assistant Bastian Casser. While Domenico's early work continued on in the vein of his father's artistic vision, coupling phosphorescent colours with figure-laden compositions, his own artistic personality eventually emerged in a tendency to give more focus to landscapes within a composition, or background details. Jacopo's drawings relied heavily on gestural line work, but Domenico's drawings tended towards a chiaroscuro modelling of forms. Though Domenico worked as an artist in the shadow of his father, at times his work was undeniably superior to that of Jacopo Robusti. One example of this success is in the painting Portrait of a Senator. In this portrait, Domenico goes beyond rendering physical likeness and social status and achieves the Renaissance ideal of capturing the individuality of the sitter, an accomplishment that places him in the tradition of Rembrandt, Velasquez or Titian.

=== Thematic influences ===
In Domenico's youth, he devoted some time to the study of literature which would inform his poetical, historical and moral themes. He painted four canvases from Ludovico Ariosto on the subject of Verginella and from Lucretius and Marino he painted a man sitting on a cradle with one foot on the edge of a tomb, implying, "From the cradle to the grave life is but a short step".

== Assessment ==
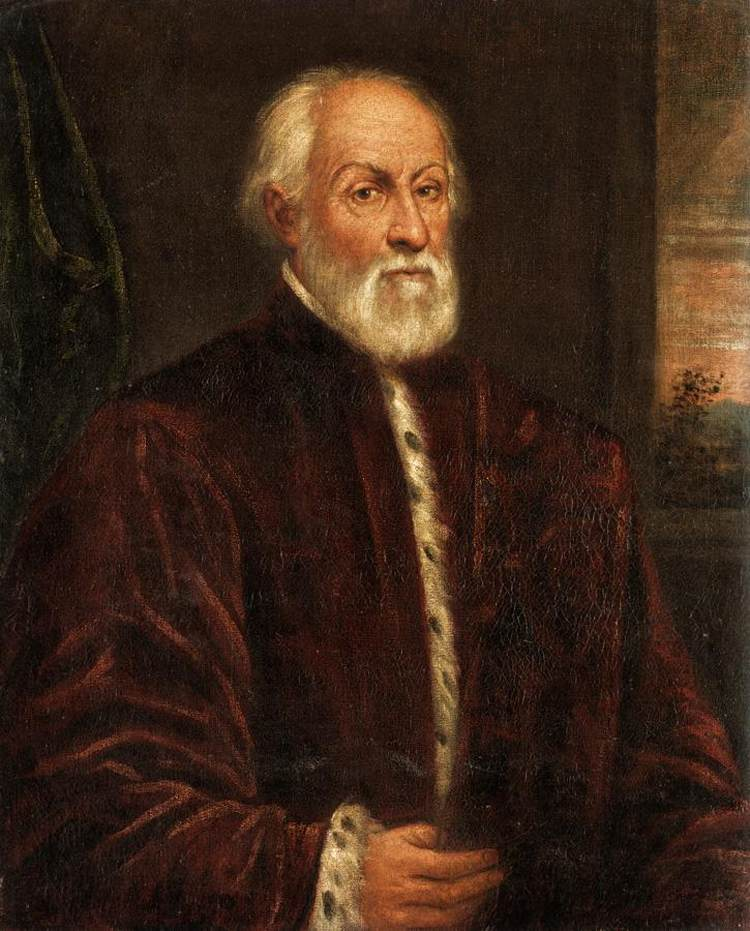
Portrait of a Gentleman

=== Attribution ===
The attribution of paintings from the Tintoretto studio is a subject of scholarly debate in determining which paintings were executed by the father and which by his son. But one such scholar takes this debate of attribution a step further. E. Tietze-Conrat finds Domenico's painting to be so accomplished that she suggests that the Venus with Lute Players, typically attributed to Titian, could perhaps actually be the work of Domenico. When Joachim von Sandrart visited Venice in 1628, he writes of acquiring a painting that he assigns to "Jacopo Tintoretto the Younger" and describes the painting as a Venus reclining on a velvet couch flanked by Cupid with a wreath of laurel and a courtier playing a lute.

=== Heir to studio ===
At age seventy-four Domenico was stricken with apoplexy and lost the use of his right hand. Though he attempted to paint with his left hand, this proved unsuccessful. Domenico had toyed with the idea of giving the studio to its present painters for the formation of an academy, but eventually, his vexation with these painters caused him to bequeath all to Sebastiano Casser. Sebastiano, of German descent, married Domenico's sister and eventually adopted the Tintoretto name. He continued to maintain the shop as a studio and a museum after the death of Domenico in 1635 and Marco in 1637. Domenico died at the age of seventy-five and was buried near his father in Santa Maria dell'Orto.

== Gallery ==
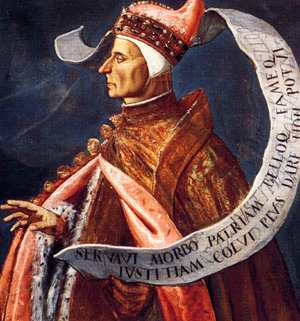
Marco Barbarigo

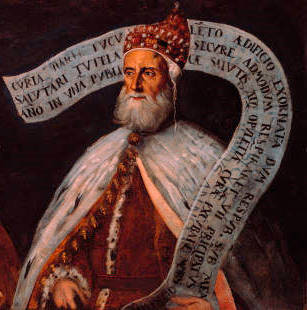
Francesco Donato

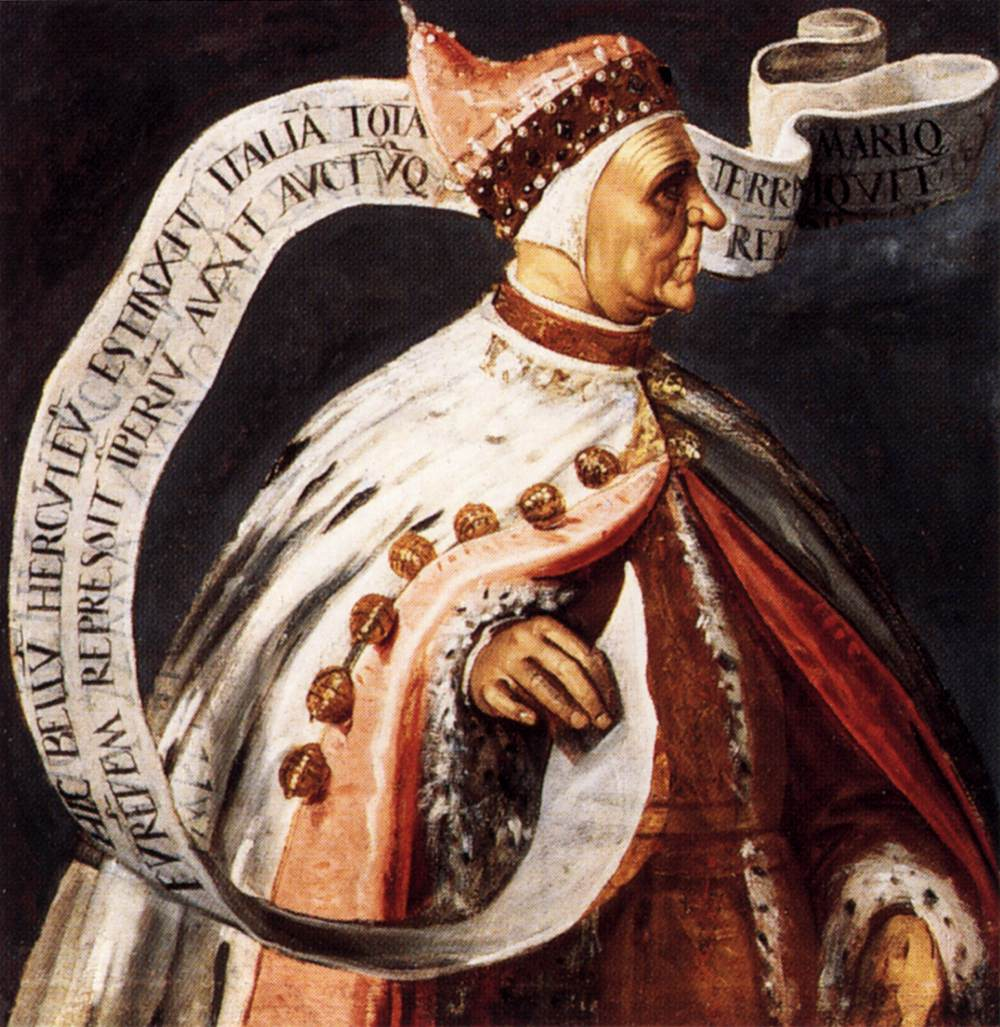
Giovanni Mocenigo

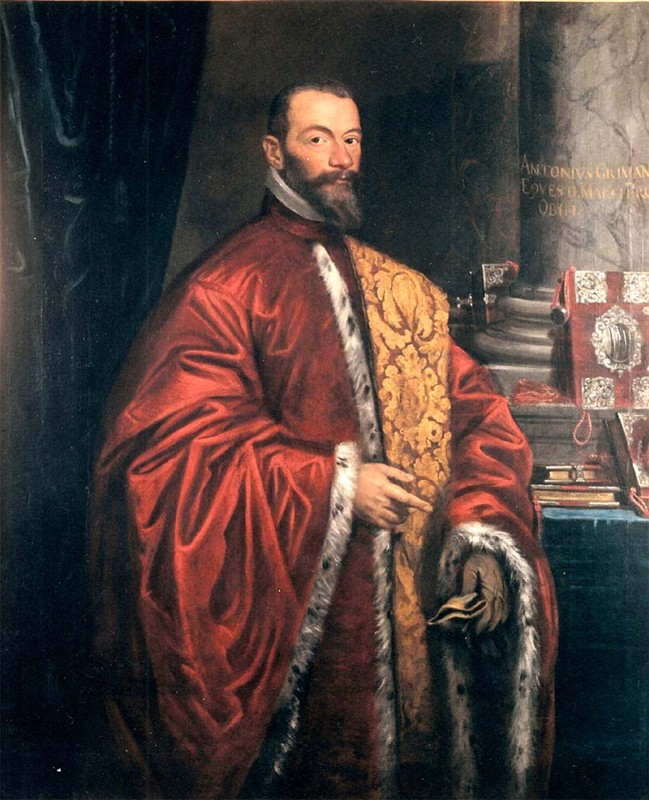
Antonio Grimani

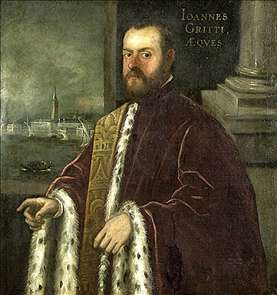
Giovanni Gritti

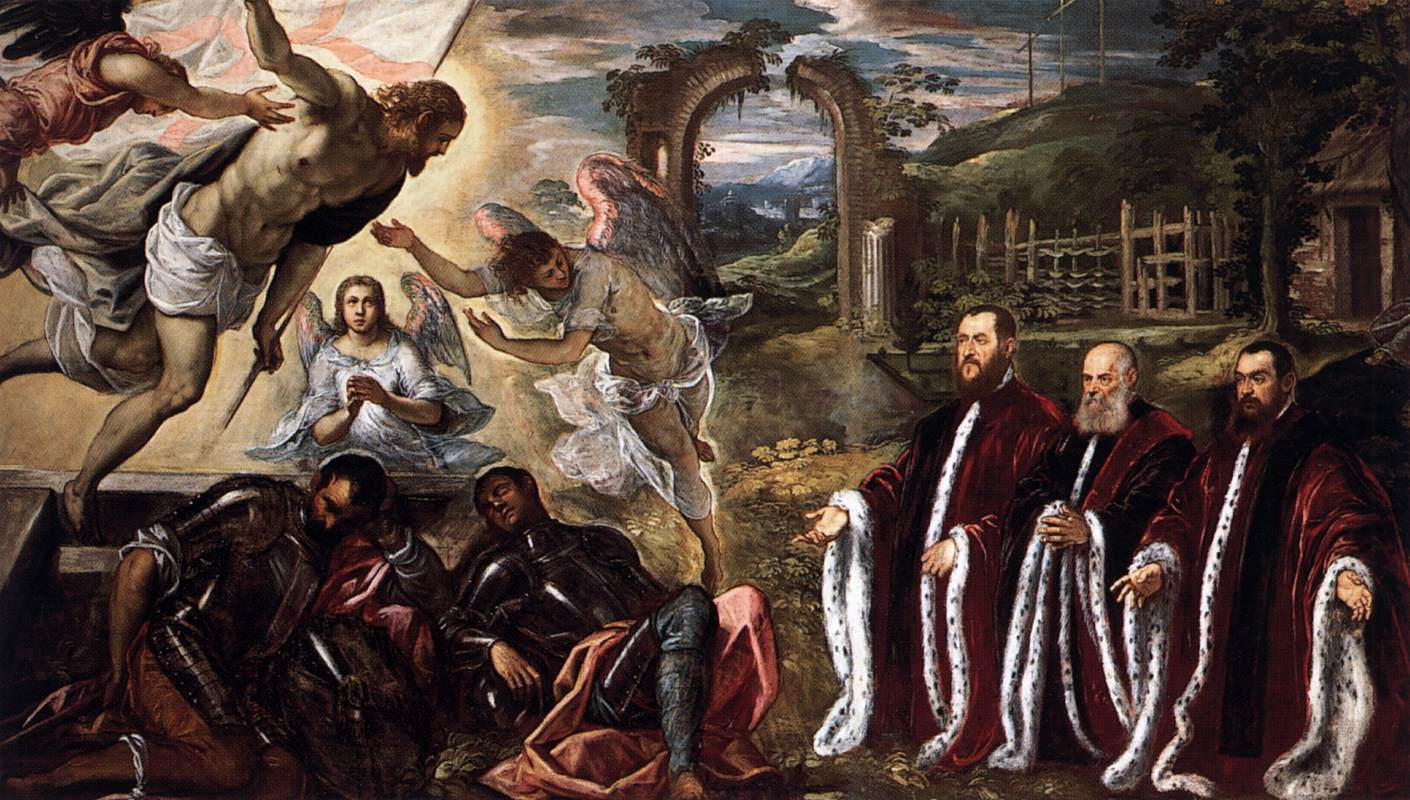
Resurrection and Three Avogadori

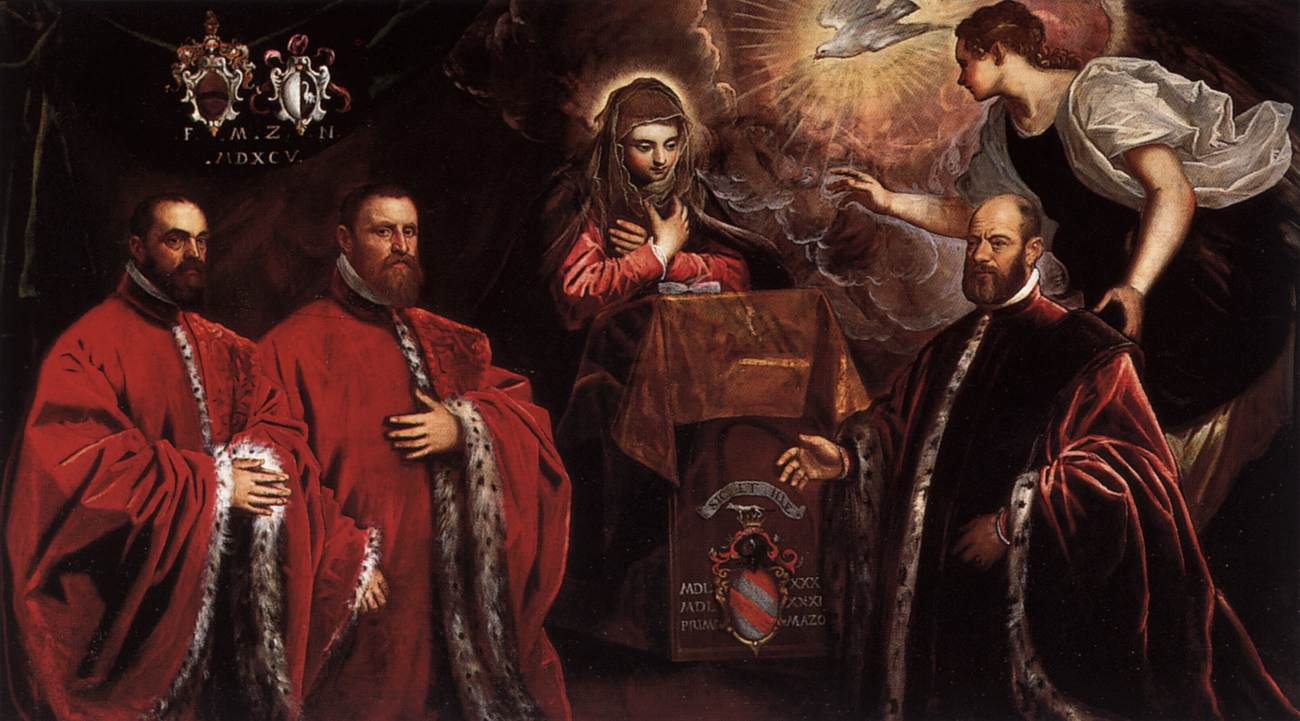
Annunciation and Three Avogadri

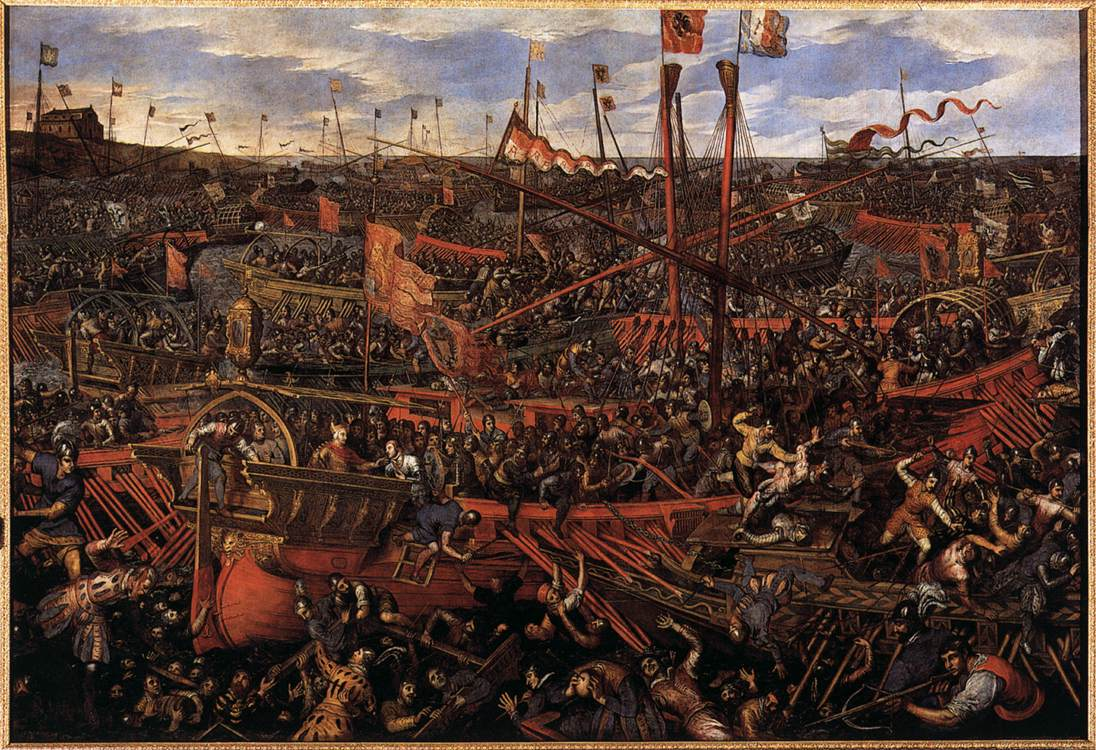
Battle of Salvore

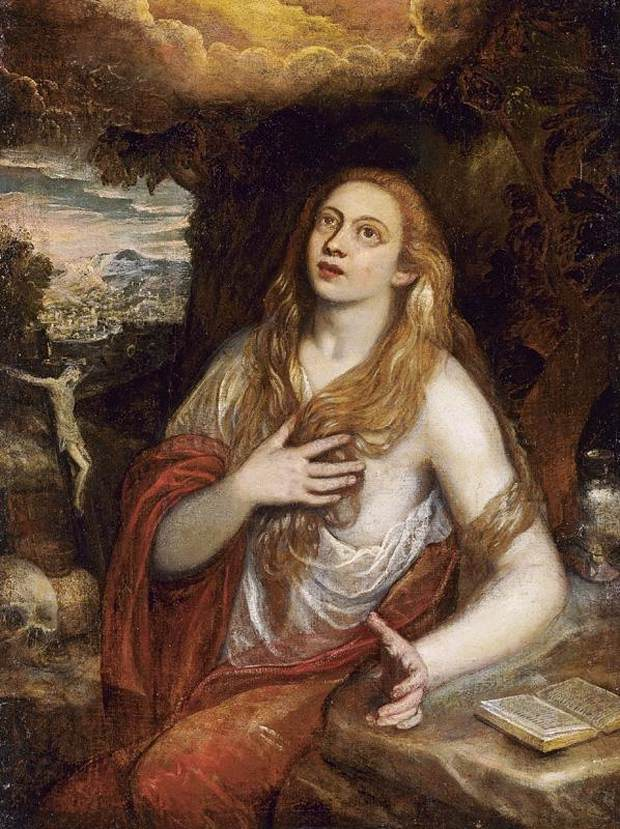
Penitent Magdalene

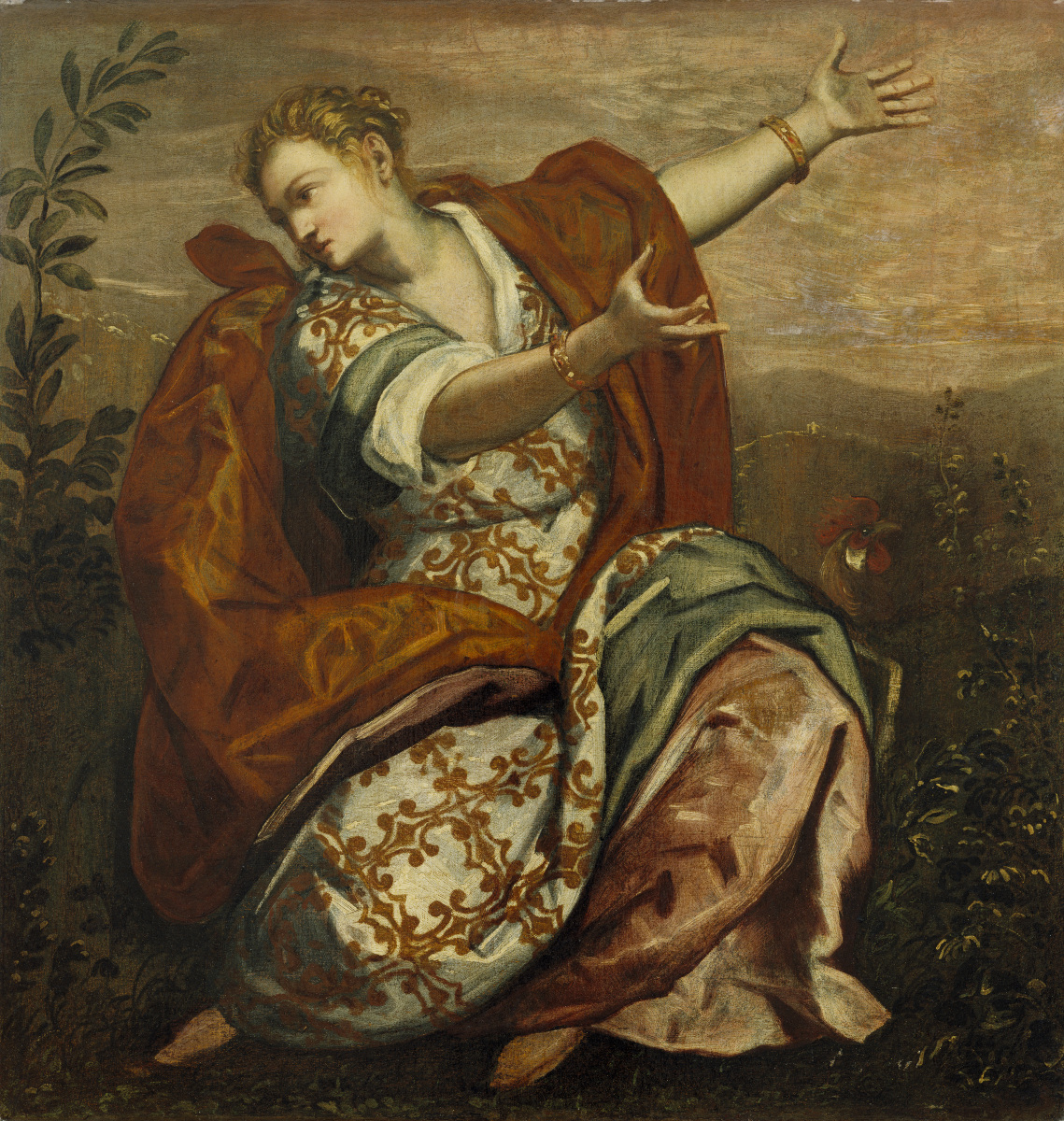
Allegory of Vigilance

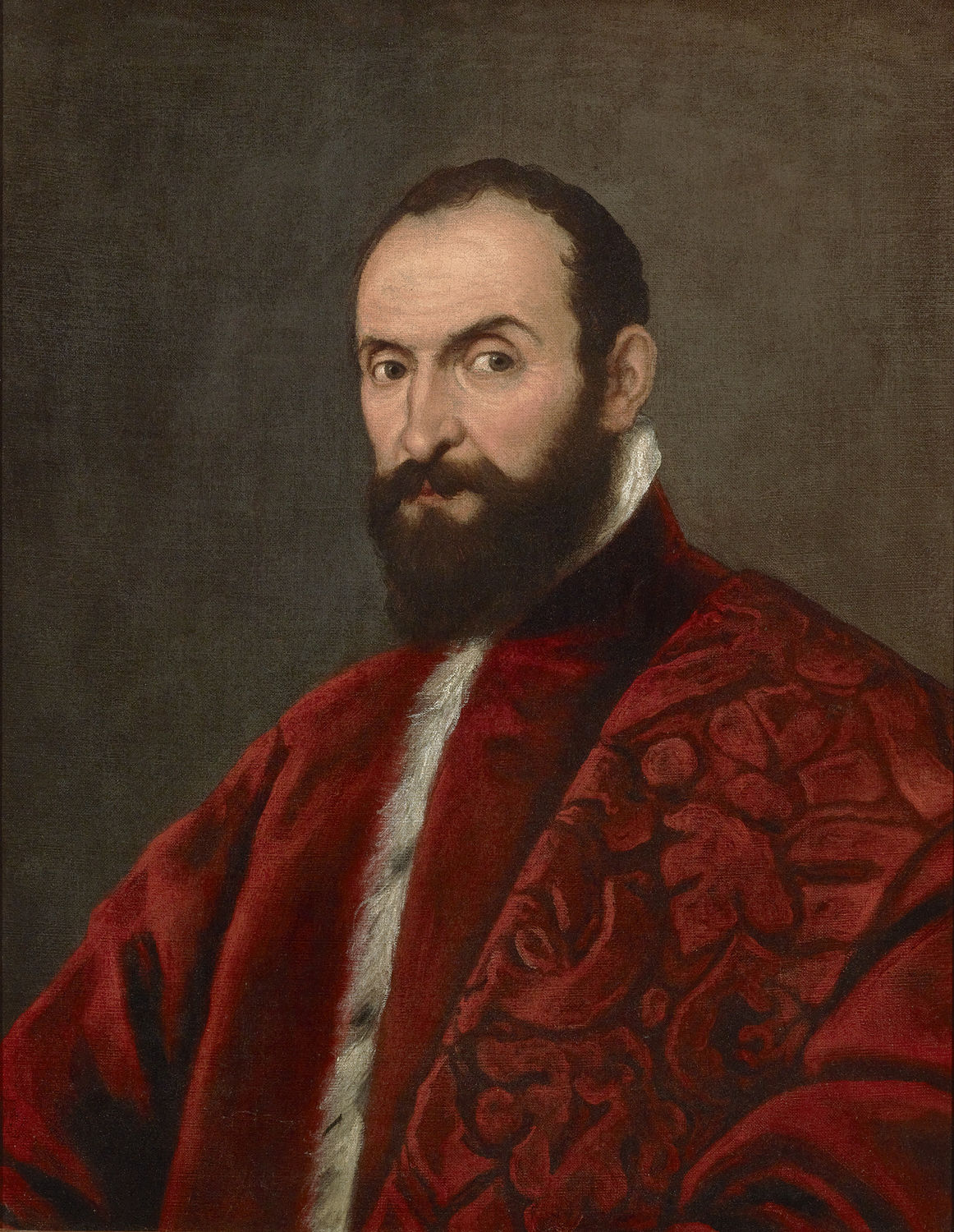
Venetian Senator

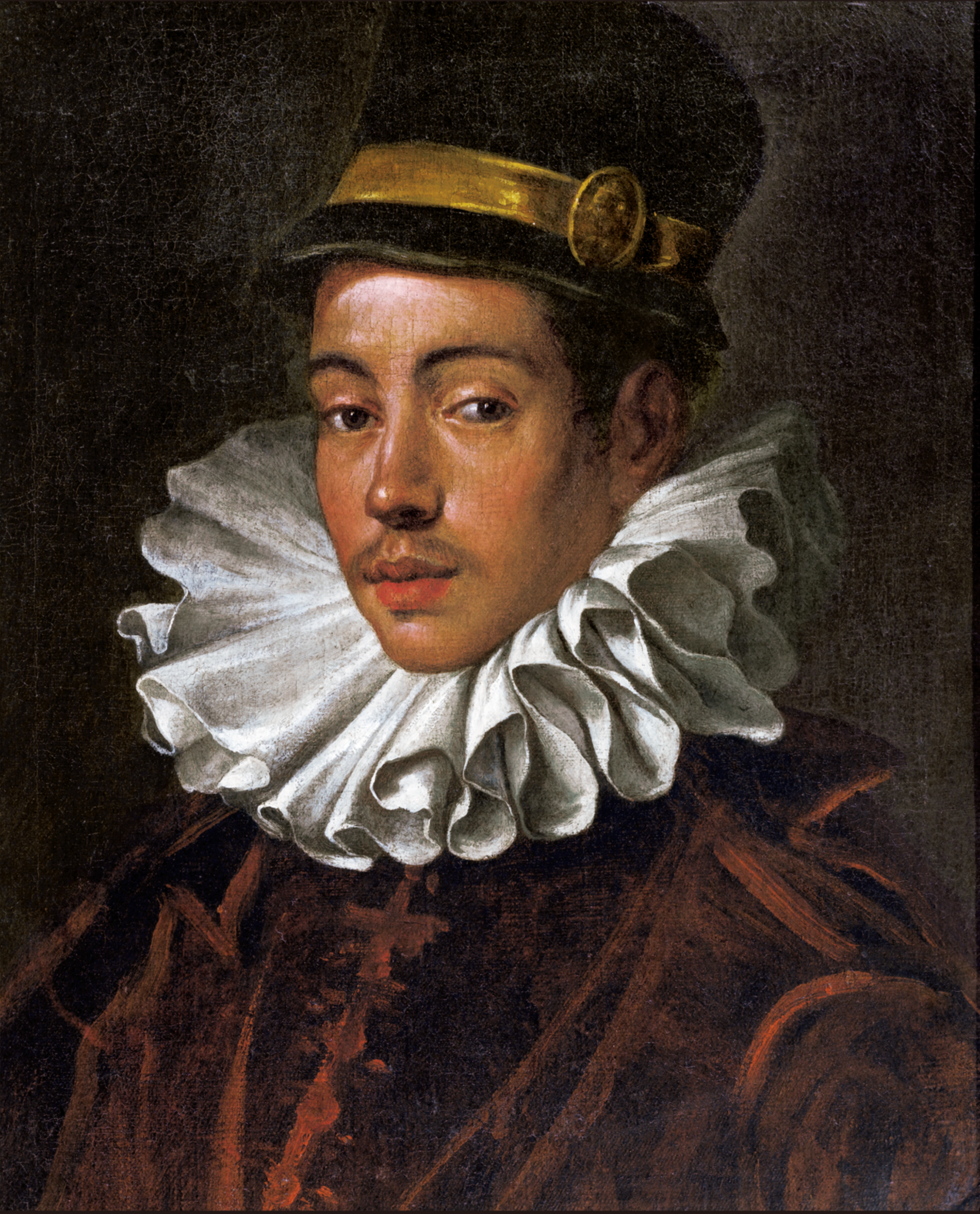
Portrait of Mancio Itō, a Japanese from the Tenshō Embassy
