= Giustina Renier Michiel =

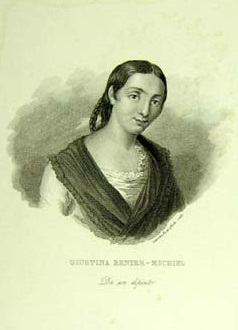
Giustina Renier Michiel

Giustina Renier Michiel (1755–1832) was an aristocratic woman who helped intellectual and social Venetian life flourish.

== Early life ==
She was born in Venice on 14 October 1755 to Andrea Renier, son of Paolo Renier (penultimate Doge of Venice), and Cecilia Manin, sister of Ludovico, the last Doge. She learned English, French, Music, Art, Math and Natural History when she was sent to a convent of Capuchin nuns at Treviso at the age of three. She was brought back to Venice at the age of nine and placed in a fashionable boarding school kept by a Frenchwoman. She was considered a bookworm and a woman with an independent mind.

== Marriage ==
At the age of 20 she married Marc Antonio Michiel on 25 October 1775. They followed her father to Rome, not long after, where he had been named the Venetian ambassador to Pope Pius VI. Though she only stayed one year she made a profound impression on the Roman society and was given the nickname Venerina Veneziana, Venetian Venus. It was during this trip that Giustina gave birth to a daughter in 1776, Elena. They had two other daughters who were born over the course of the next two years, Cecilia and Chiara (died at age ten). She was often left alone with her children while her husband traveled and so she was unhappy and ended up getting a divorce from her husband on 4 August 1784 Their divorce left her free to enjoy an active social life, which had been something her husband did not approve of.

When she came back from her yearlong stay in Rome, her paternal grandfather, Paolo Renier, was elected doge. Because the people refused to accept his wife Margherita Delmaz, a dancer, as a dogaressa, Giustina Renier Michiel had to step in. She served as first lady in all official ceremonies when necessary between the years of 1779 and 1789 while also pursuing her intellectual passions and hosting a literary salon.

== Salon ==
Giustina Renier Michiel’s salon was considered one of the two most in vogue salons of Venice, the other being that of her friend Isabella Teotochi. There was a particularly Venetian character to her salon and it was frequented by well-known literary figures such as Ippolito Pindemonte, Marina Querini Benzon, Ugo Foscolo, Giustiniana Wynne (Countess Rosenberg), the French Madame de Staël and the English Lord Byron. She built connections between people, introducing scholars to one another, and promoted socializing and intellectual conversation. Her salon was not all about intense intellect; it had a good stream of recreational pleasure. Vittorio Malamani had said that her guests often arrived after midnight once the theater finished in order to discuss the works that they had just seen and to play "society games."

When Napoleon invaded Venice, she closed her salon and pursued the study of botany and the publishing of her Shakespeare translations for the next ten years. She translated Othello and Macbeth in 1798 and Coriolanus in 1800 from English to Italian.

== Publication ==
During this time she also started her monumental work published in six volumes, Le origine delle feste veneziane. The book was heavily researched and was an extensive look into Venice’s festivals, myths and public rituals. This collection of Venetian traditions was one way in which she tried defending Venice and its history. "She seemed to make it her duty to prevent anything from disturbing the ghost of the defunct republic."

== Later life ==
She eventually reopened her salon and held it thus till her death. She was a patroness of Canova and a correspondent with Chateaubriand. She wrote many letters, many of which went to her niece Adriana Zannini, Marc Antonio Michiel, Contessa Marina Beneti Cicciaponi and many others. In her later years she had to wear an ear trumpet for she became deaf. On April 6, 1832 she died surrounded by her friends and grandchildren at the age of 77, and she was interred at the San Michele cemetery on the Isola di San Michele, in Venice.
