= 1789 Venetian doge election =

1789 election of the Doge of Venice

- 9 March 1789

41 electors 25 votes needed to win
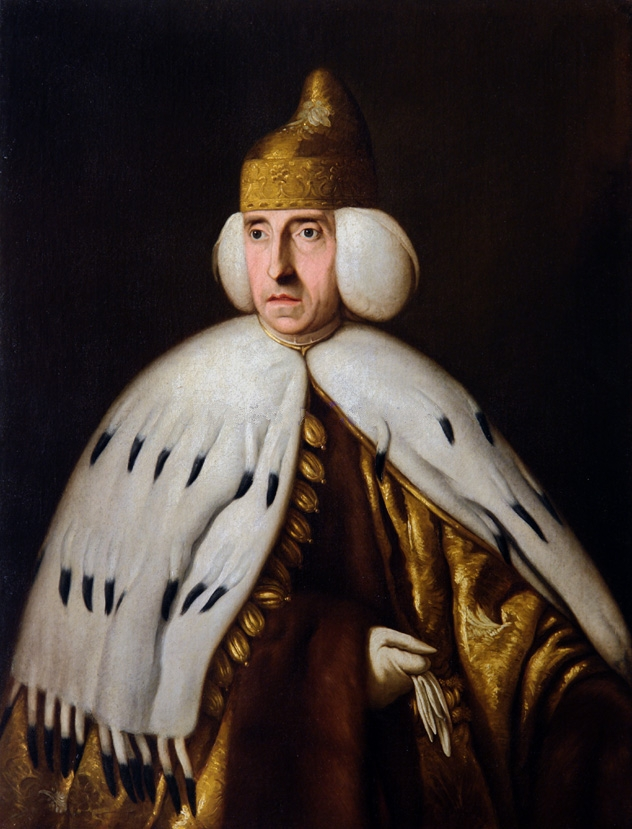
Candidate	Lodovico Manin	Pietro Gradenigo
Electoral vote	28	< 13
Percentage	68.3%	< 31.7%
Doge before election
Paolo Renier
Elected doge
Lodovico Manin

The 1789 Venetian doge election took place on 9 March 1789, to elect the new Doge of Venice following the death of Paolo Renier. The election resulted in the victory of Lodovico Manin. Manin would go on to be the 120th and final Doge of Venice before the fall of the Republic in 1797.

== Background ==
In February 1789, Doge Paolo Renier died, leaving the ducal throne vacant. Lodovico Manin emerged as a prominent candidate. He was the eldest son of Lodovico III Alvise and Lucrezia Maria Basadonna, and his family was immensely wealthy.

When Manin began public life, he was quickly noticed for his generosity, honesty, kindness, and wealth. At 26 he had been elected captain of Vicenza, then of Verona (where he coped with a flood in 1757), and finally Brescia. In 1764, he was appointed procurator de ultra of Saint Mark's Basilica. However, his family was considered "new money" by the standards of the Venetian patriciate, originating from Friuli and integrating into the nobility much later than the old, established aristocratic houses.

== Election ==
The electoral assembly was composed of the standard 41 electors. On 9 March 1789, Lodovico Manin was elected Doge of Venice, securing 28 out of the 41 votes.

His election caused a significant stir among the older aristocratic families, who resented the elevation of a "new money" patrician to the highest office. Upon his election, his rival, Pietro Gradenigo, famously lamented the outcome, stating: "They have chosen a Doge from Friuli. The Republic is dead."

=== Voting summary ===
1789 Venetian Doge election results
Candidate	Votes	%
Lodovico Manin	28	68.3%
Pietro Gradenigo	< 13	< 31.7%
Total electors	41	100%

== Aftermath and dogate ==
Following his election, Manin's traditional coronation ceremony required him to throw coins to the Venetians, which cost more than 458,197 Lira. Less than a quarter of this was paid from the funds of the Republic of Venice, with the rest coming out of his own pocket.

His election took place the same year that would see the start of the French Revolution a few months later. By the year 1792, he had allowed the once great Venetian merchant fleet to decline to a mere 309 merchantmen. When Napoleon invaded Italy, Venice did not initially join the coalition of Italian states formed in 1795, instead maintaining neutrality.

On 15 April 1797, French general Jean-Andoche Junot gave the Doge an ultimatum which he refused. On 25 April 1797, the French fleet arrived at the Lido. The Venetian war fleet numbered only 4 galleys and 7 galliots, and could not repel the invasion. Manin surrendered on 12 May 1797 and officially left the Doge's Palace two days later. On 16 May, French troops entered Piazza San Marco and the surrender contract was officially signed, formally abolishing the office of Doge and submitting Venice to French rule.

Following his abdication, Manin refused an offer to become the interim head of the municipality and withdrew from society. He returned the ducal insignia (principally the distinctive ducal crown known as the corno ducale) alongside the "Golden Book" that served as a register of the oligarchical families. Lodovico died in his villa of dropsy and heart problems on 24 October 1802.

== Sources ==
- Lodovico Manin. Memorie del dogado, preface and notes by Attilio Sarfatti, Venice, 1886 (in Italian)
