= Bernardino Castelli =

Italian painter (1750–1810)

Portrait of Francesco Falier, Provveditore Generale di Dalmazia (1783-1786)

Bernardino Castelli (15 June 1750, Arsiè - 24 February 1810, Venice) was an Italian painter of portraits and religious figures.

== Biography ==
He displayed artistic talent at an early age, taking his first lessons in Feltre from a local artist named Giovanni D'Antonio and helping to decorate the Villa Franzoia in Quero. His work there impressed the Canon, Alvise Franzoia, who took him to Treviso and presented him to Bishop Paolo Francesco Giustiniani who offered to take him under his protection and helped him to continue his studies.

His first major work was a portrait of the Bishop, which brought requests for more portraits by other prelates in the area and launched him on a career as a portrait painter. He also did a painting of Saint Lorenzo Giustiniani for the chapel of the Treviso Seminary, a Saint Joseph for the parish of Rasai in Seren del Grappa and a Saint Spyridon for the parish of Coste in Maser. In 1772, he was commissioned by the Dominicans at the church of Saint Nicholas to do several portraits, restore others, and create a gallery in the chapter house, which was destroyed during a bombing raid in 1944. Three years later, at the invitation of Bishop Giustiniani and his brother, Castelli moved to Padua, where he became a private portrait painter.

In 1782, after establishing his reputation, he went to Venice and joined the Accademia di Belle Arti di Venezia. His sitters there included the Doges Paolo Renier and Ludovico Manin as well as Popes Pius VI and Pius VII. Ten years later, he relocated to Bologna and became a member of the "Accademia Clementina" (now the Accademia di Belle Arti di Bologna). He also worked briefly in Ferrara. Later, he turned down an invitation by Antonio Canova to come to Rome, and returned to Venice.

Despite his fame as a portraitist, he never abandoned religious themes and was known as the "painter of beautiful Madonnas". One of his last works was a depiction of Susanna and the Elders, painted as part of a competition organized by Girolamo Manfrin, a tobacco merchant who was also a patron of the arts. A canvas of Saint Gerolamo collecting money for orphans was left unfinished and completed by Liberale Cozza.
