= Elisabetta Grimani =

Last Dogaressa of Venice

- Dogaressa
- Reign: 1789 — August 31, 1792
- Predecessor: Margherita Dalmet
- Successor: office abolished
- Died: August 31, 1792; Treviso
- Spouse: Lodovico Manin
- Father: Antonio Grimani

Elisabetta Grimani (died August 31, 1792) was the last Dogaressa of Venice by marriage to the Doge Ludovico Manin (r. 1789–1797).

== Biography ==
Elisabetta Grimani was the daughter of Antonio Grimani. She married Ludovico Manin on 14 September 1748. A contemporary description of her during the election of her spouse to Doge of Venice in 1789 related, "The triumph of the Doge must be somewhat dampened by his wife, who, by some womanish singularity, is not pleased at becoming Dogaressa. She would not appear at any of the feasts, but has hidden herself, according to some, at Murano, others say she has taken refuge in her steward's house!" Grimani was described as modest and simple.

Grimani suffered from a long lasting terminal illness, resulting in large amounts of anxiety, but is said to have maintained a firmness of mind until her death in Treviso. She was the last Dogaressa of Venice, and the last to be afforded a state funeral as such.

A Latin Oratio Imperata was made about her: "Illud sane celebranduniy, quod per longos eosque jplurimos annos acerha valitudine correpta, nunquam aut vi deterrita aut languoribus oppressa, semper naturce dehilitationi superior, et magnitudine animi constans visafm'tJ'.

Preceded by Margherita Dalmet	Dogaressa of Venice; 1789–1792	Title abolished
