= 2009 swine flu pandemic in the Philippines =

Disease outbreak in the Philippines

- Outbreak evolution in the Philippines as confirmed or suspected by different agencies. (Note: Map may not show provinces with deaths confirmed to be A/H1N1 related as per the Department of Health. Reports reported by the media to be A/H1N1 related may conflict with DOH records.) Provinces with confirmed cases
- Disease: Influenza
- Pathogen: Influenza A virus subtype H1N1
- Location: Philippines
- First outbreak: Could have been in Veracruz, Central Mexico/US
- Index case: Muntinlupa, Metro Manila
- Arrival date: May 21, 2009 (17 years, 5 months, 4 weeks and 2 days ago)
- Confirmed cases: 1,709–3,207
- Deaths: 8–28

The 2009 swine flu pandemic was confirmed to have spread to the Philippines on May 21, 2009. In the following days, several local cases were reported to be caused by contact with two infected Taiwanese women who attended a wedding ceremony in Zambales.

The 18-year-old arrived at the country on May 18 and was hospitalized the day after at the Research Institute for Tropical Medicine in Muntinlupa. On May 21, Department of Health (DOH) secretary Francisco Duque confirmed the case being the first Philippine swine flu case. The first confirmed case in the Philippines was publicly announced on May 22, 2009.

Since the outbreak of A(H1N1) in the Americas, President Gloria Macapagal Arroyo urged the Department of Health, the Bureau of Immigration, the Bureau of Quarantine and other concerned agencies to control monitor airport and seaport arrivals for possible flu infection. Thermal imaging equipment were installed at major airports to screen passengers coming from infected countries for flu symptoms. The Philippines may quarantine travelers arriving from Mexico with fever. Also, the importation of hogs from the U.S. and Mexico was banned, and the restriction of swine influenza vaccine use was retracted. First death was reported on June 19, 2009, a 49-year-old female Filipino employee of the Congress, as well as the first death in Asia.

== Summary ==
2009 Influenza A(H1N1) cases in the Philippines summary
Number of confirmed cases	See table above
Number of provinces and cities with confirmed cases	47^{[a]}
Number of NCR cities with confirmed cases	12^{[a]}
Number of cities/locations with confirmed deaths	9^{[a]}
First confirmed infection in the country	May 21, 2009
First confirmed death in the country	June 19, 2009
First infection of an OFW/citizen abroad	June 1, 2009 in Saudi Arabia
First Filipino death abroad	July 16, 2009 ( (China) ) in Hong Kong
First low-level transmission (community outbreak)	June 14, 2009 in Barangay Hilera, Jaen, Nueva Ecija
First school to report influenza infection	June 23, 2009; De La Salle University, Manila
Fatalities	9 (as of July 29, local reports); 8 (as of July 29, DOH report)

Human Influenza A(H1N1) cases in the Philippines (By Region)
Cases		Deaths
Laboratory confirmed^{(DOH)}	Date of las confirmation^{(DOH)}	Confirmed deaths^{(DOH)}
3,207 (1,709)	July 30 (July 30)	9; 8
Regional breakdown^{‡}: / Confirmed cases / Deaths; Region I / 5 / 0; Region II / 1 / 0; CAR / 187 / 4; Region III / 248 / 0; NCR / 1, 255 / 4; Region IV-A / 251 / 0; Region IV-B / 10 / 0; Region V / 28 / 0; Region VI / 7 / 0; Region VII / 10 / 0; Region VIII / 42 / 1; Region IX / 1 / 0; Region X / 19 / 0; ARMM / 0 / 0; Region XI / 11 / 0; Region XII / 1 / 0; Caraga / 13 / 0; Non-DOH total / 1, 815 / 9^{‡} Figures per region is not tallied into independent news sources and DOH updates. This is a natural situation since DOH did not issued updates anymore.

- ^{a} Tallies may vary. Please see respective references on the affected regions section.

== Cases ==
Chronology of 2009 Influenza A(H1N1) cases in the Philippines
Date
Number of confirmed cases
Deaths

May 2009
May 22	1	0
May 24	2	0
May 27	8	0
May 28	10	0
May 29	14	0
May 31	16	0

June 2009
June 1	21	0
June 3	22	0
June 4	29	0
June 5	33	0
June 6	36	0
June 8	46	0
June 9	57	0
June 10	77	0
June 11	92	0
June 13	111	0
June 14	147	0
June 15	193	0
June 16	247	0
June 17	311	0
June 18	344	0
June 20	392	0
June 21	428	0
June 22	445	1
June 23	473	1
June 24	604	1
June 25	727	1
June 26	861	1

July 2009
July 1	1,709	1
July 10^{* #}	1,709	3
July 13	2,268	3
July 17	2,268	4
July 23	2,268	5
July 29	2,268	9

August 2009
Aug 1	3,207	9

Notes
Color legends:
Milestone in number tally. Example: 500-mark has passed
First death confirmation.
Notes:
^{*} DOH last announcement day.
^{#} Reported to DOH by July 10, but was made public only on July 13.

Items in italic face are not included to the DOH official tally, but was estimated only by various news sources.

=== Detection and confirmation of the first case ===
On May 18, 2009, a Filipino family coming from a trip in Houston, Texas arrived in the country. Though infected by the flu, their ten-year-old female child did not exhibit any symptoms except a day after arrival. Due to this, her parents decided to inform the local health authorities about it, prompting Department of Health (DOH) representatives to require the girl to undergo laboratory testing at the Research Institute for Tropical Medicine (RITM) in Muntinlupa.

On Thursday, May 21, health authorities and the RITM were able to confirm that the girl was and the first virus "carrier" through throat specimen tests, and the first A(H1N1) infected in the Philippines.

The next day, Health Secretary Duque announced the first flu case at a conference of the World Health Organization (WHO) in Geneva. He then assured members of the media at that time that there was no outbreak of A(H1N1) in the Philippines. The patient was treated with oseltamivir (Tamiflu) and other anti-viral drugs and was discharged on May 28.

=== Deaths ===
During the pandemic, the Department of Health (DOH) has officially counted for 8 A/H1N1 deaths. The DOH kept record until July 29, 2009. A separate European Centre for Disease Prevention and Control report dated September 9, 2009 tallied the number of deaths in the Philippines to 28. The first A(H1N1) fatality in the Philippines was a 49-year-old woman who also had a chronic heart disease who died on June 19. The woman is an employee of the House of Representatives and is a resident of Santa Rosa, Laguna. The case was also the first recorded death in Asia.

=== Community outbreaks ===
In mid-June 2009, the first community outbreak of A(H1N1) in the Philippines was confirmed by the Department of Health. The followed the confirmation of eight mild cases in Jaen, Nueva Ecija. The town was placed under a state of calamity on June 16, 2009, when the town already had 19 confirmed cases. Community outbreaks were also declared in parts of Metro Manila, Baguio, and Eastern Visayas.

== National responses ==
Highest Philippine response alert level: Level 4
Alert Level 1: No confirmed case of Influenza A(H1N1) in the Philippines.; Response: Be updated on Influenza A(H1N1)-related events.; Observing proper hygiene and proper use of sanitation facilities.; Listing of students/individuals that have travel histories on countries infected by the disease.	Alert Level 2: Confirmed case(s) of Influenza A(H1N1) virus in the Philippines.; No confirmed cases in schools.; No confirmed human-to-human transmissions.; Response: Be updated on Influenza A(H1N1)-related events.; Observing proper hygiene and proper use of sanitation facilities.; Listing of students/individuals that have travel histories on countries infected by the disease as well as listing students/individuals with influenza-like symptoms.; Isolating individuals with Influenza A(H1N1) symptoms.; Establishing health referral stations.	Alert Level 3: Confirmed case(s) and/or death related to Influenza A(H1N1) virus in the Philippines.; Confirmed case(s) in school(s).; No confirmed human-to-human transmissions.; Response: Be updated on Influenza A(H1N1)-related events.; Observing proper hygiene and proper use of sanitation facilities.; Listing of students/individuals that have travel histories on countries infected by the disease as well as listing students/individuals with influenza-like symptoms.; Isolating individuals with Influenza A(H1N1) symptoms.; Establishing health referral stations.; Suspension of classes on the affected school(s).	Alert Level 4: Confirmed case(s) and/or death related to Influenza A(H1N1) virus in the Philippines.; Confirmed case(s) in school(s).; Confirmed human-to-human transmission(s).; Declared community outbreak(s).; Response: Be updated on Influenza A(H1N1)-related events.; Observing proper hygiene and proper use of sanitation facilities.; Listing of students/individuals that have travel histories on countries infected by the disease as well as listing students/individuals with influenza-like symptoms.; Isolating individuals with Influenza A(H1N1) symptoms.; Establishing health referral stations.; Suspension of classes on the affected school(s) and area(s).
Lifting suspension: No more confirmation of cases in the affected school(s) and/or area(s) for seven days.; No more cases under observation(s) in the affected school(s) and/or area(s).; No more positive confirmed cases in the affected school(s) and/or area(s) for ten days.; Source: Department of Health

=== Presidential actions ===
In a press conference, Press Secretary Cerge Remonde said that President Arroyo has reiterated her instructions to the DOH, the Bureau of Immigration and all other concerned agencies to be on the top of the situation for regular updates.

The president also ensured that the government is ready to give one million capsules of Tamiflu in case of an epidemic.

Despite the increasing number of cases of A(H1N1) in the country, Press Secretary Remonde said that the Palace is not alarmed with the sudden surge of disease in the Philippines.

=== Travel bans and advisories ===
The government issued travel advisories for Mexico, the United States and other mostly-infected areas, advising Filipinos to refrain from making unnecessary travel.

=== Policy of mitigation ===
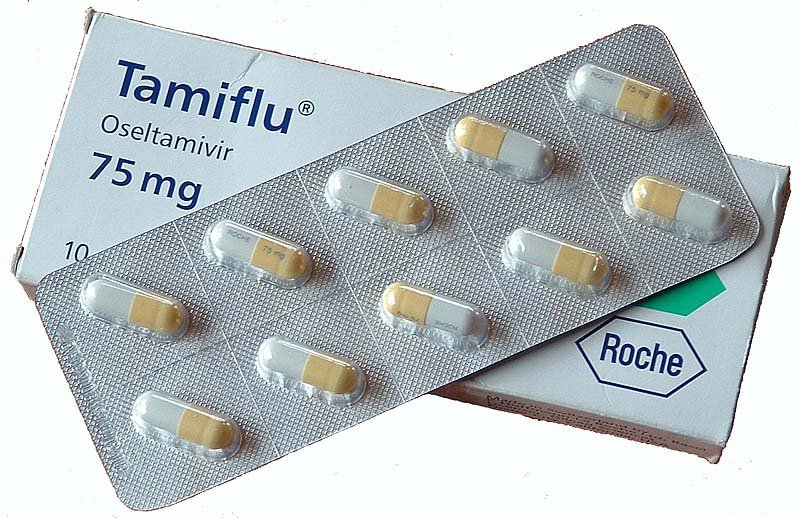
Tamiflu, influenza antiviral drug

Though the influenza virus is now treated mild, DOH will only then treat it like an ordinary flu, whereas it is no longer an obligation to follow all sick persons. According to Duque, if they shall continue their containment policy, the DOH will lose all their resources. He added, "Ituturing na lamang namin ito na parang [isang] karaniwang trangkaso na lamang. Mahirap namang babantayan mo[/natin] lahat ng [mga] 'yan[g pasyente]." (We shall treat this disease like an ordinary influenza). It is so difficult, as you think, to follow and trace all of them (the patients).

On the other hand, DOH shifted into policy of mitigation where patients with symptoms anomaly exhibiting swine flu will just go see a doctor.

=== Government action ===
==== Vaccine issues and benefits ====
Department of Health's poster about what-to-do and response level system of the government regarding the flu.

Dr. Lyndon Lee Suy, head of the Emerging and Re-emerging Infectious Diseases Program of the Department of Health (DOH), said that the Philippine government, on July 5, still cannot afford to buy mass vaccine, which is estimated to cost PhP 1,000 per dosage. He said that the elderly, among the high-risk group in the Philippines, has a population of around 3.6 million, and vaccination among them requires PhP 3.6 billion (which is a tentative equivalent for the health department's three-year budget). Dr. Lee Suy also added that the stocked 1.5 million anti-viral medicines such as Tamiflu by the DOH is not enough for possible epidemic since most of them are given free to discourage uncontrolled and panic buying. He also said that high-risked group does not only includes elderly, but individuals 5 years and below and with naturally harmful diseases.

On July 7, Roche Philippines announced that it would cut down prices of Tamiflu from PhP 1,000 to PhP 880, to ensure adequate supply of the said anti-viral drug in the Philippines and the rest of the world.

The same day, in a hearing at the Philippine House of Representatives (Congress), Health secretary Francisco Duque requested PhP 19.8 billion fund for H1N1 resistance. He said that the money will be used for buying vaccines (PhP 16 billion), subsidizing poor patients and assistance to the families of poor victims (PhP 3 billion), and implementing rules and rehabilitation of target hospitals for H1N1 patients (PhP 800 million). The Congress questioned the amount of fund largely it is too huge to award and that there are no vaccine yet to buy. On the same hand, Iloilo Representative Ferjenel Biron, also the chairman of the House Committee on Health, asked the secretary to cut its requested budget down to 10% or PhP 2 billion.

On July 27, 2009, the Department of Health announced that the doctors and other health workers such as nurses, aides and volunteers that helped the government to assist H1N1 patients and victims will be among the group that will become the first recipient of 100,000 H1N1 vaccine from the World Health Organization. The vaccine is expected to be out from United States by mid-October.

On August 2, San Juan, Metro Manila officials created a city ordinance seeking PhP 1 million budget seeking for an immediate purchase for health workers in the said city. The resolution will be known as "Battle Against Swine Flu Virus" Ordinance. At the same time, around 3,500 employees of the Caloocan City Hall were given free ant-flu vaccine shots, "to strengthen local government employees' immune system against seasonal flu".

== Impact ==
=== Education ===
The day after the confirmation of the first case in the country, the Department of Education (DepEd) indicated that classes will continue to start on June 1 as scheduled. In consulting with Secretary Duque, both he and Education Secretary Jesli Lapus reached a decision to go on with the original scheduled date of the opening of classes. Dr. Tayag also said that there is no reason for class suspension unless there is an actual outbreak in the country. Secretary Lapus has instructed schools to carry out seminars and launch an information campaign about the symptoms and virus prevention among schools.

In line with this, Secretary Duque issued on May 30 a response alert system on when schools should suspend their classes.

Following the raising of the response alert level to Level 4, the Commission on Higher Education (CHEd) moved the opening of classes for all colleges and universities nationwide from June 8 to 15, 2009. The postponement of classes was meant to enable the students, especially those coming from abroad vacations, to monitor their health and undergo self-quarantine in case of any virus symptoms will exhibit. Classes from the elementary to the college level were suspended in various schools in the Philippines due to cases of A(H1N1) being confirmed among their population.

=== Politics ===
Work at the House of Representatives was suspended from June 23 to 28, due to the confirmation of at a death of an employee of the lower house from A(H1N1).

=== Religious sector ===
Temporary changes in the conduct of Mass by the Roman Catholic Church in the Philippines was made as a response to the A(H1N1) pandemic. On June 5, Manila Archbishop Cardinal Gaudencio Rosales through instructions to Fr. Genaro Diwa of the Ministry of the Liturgical Affairs of the Archdiocese of Manila, issued an advisory ordering priests to temporarily give communion only by the hand, instead of the traditional mouth; and that holding hands during singing of the Lord's Prayer was to be discouraged. An Oratio Imperata obligatory prayer on H1N1 was also obligated to be recited by mass participants.

On June 23, the Archbishop of Jaro (in Iloilo) Angel Lagdameo ordered local churches to empty holy water stoups whereas churchgoers are strongly advised to do sign of the cross instead of using holy water.

Around two months after the memorandum ordering extra precautions on the mob regarding catching flu in churches, the Catholic Bishops Conference of the Philippines (CBCP) announced that the new flu strain failed to drag Filipino believers out of churches. According to Msgr. Achilles Dakay of the Roman Catholic Archdiocese of Cebu, church attendance in the archdiocese remained normal despite advisories.

=== Tourism ===
Tourism secretary Joseph Ace Durano as of 24 May said that there were no reported cancellations in any tourism booking so far.

== Affected regions ==
Mitigation means that we only do early detection and aggressive treatment of cases as they come especially for those with high-risk preexisting conditions. Those manifesting with mild symptoms can be managed and monitored at home so that only patients at risk who develop complications will have to be hospitalized. H1N1 will now become part of our Influenza-like Illness (ILI) surveillance activity and one of our notifiable diseases. It offers little benefit to do extensive tracing of this virus when it is clear that the disease can be passed on to others at a rate faster than it will ever be humanly possible to find the contacts.

— Francisco Duque, DOH secretary
In response to mitigation policy of the department

There were at least 50 infected provinces and cities in the Philippines (excluding Metro Manila component cities):

- Abra^{†} (CAR)
- Aklan (VI)
- Albay (V)
- Apayao^{†} (CAR)
- Agusan del Norte (XIII)
- Baguio^{†} (CAR)
- Bataan (III)
- Batangas (IV-A)
- Benguet^{†} (CAR)
- Bohol (VII)
- Bukidnon (X)
- Bulacan (III)
- Cagayan (II)
- Camarines Sur (V)
- Capiz (VI)
- Cavite (IV-A)
- Cotabato (XII)
- Davao City (XI)
- Davao del Norte (XI)
- Davao del Sur (XI)
- Cebu (VII)
- Eastern Samar^{††} (VIII)
- Ifugao^{†} (CAR)
- Iloilo (VI)
- Kalinga^{†} (CAR)
- Laguna (IV-A)
- Leyte^{†} (VIII)
- Naga (V)
- Mountain Province^{†} (CAR)
- Misamis Occidental (X)
- Misamis Oriental (X)
- Nueva Ecija^{††} (III)
- Negros Occidental (VII)
- Negros Oriental (VII)
- Northern Samar^{††} (VIII)
- Oriental Mindoro (IV-B)
- Pampanga (III)
- Pangasinan (I)
- Quezon (IV-A)
- Rizal (IV-A)
- Samar^{††} (VIII)
- Sarangani (XII)
- Southern Leyte (VIII)
- Tarlac (III)
- Zambales (III)
- Zamboanga City (IX)
- Zamboanga del Norte (IX)
- Zamboanga del Sur (IX)

On the same hand, Metro Manila has the following infected cities:

- Caloocan
- Manila^{††}
- Makati^{††}
- Mandaluyong^{††}
- Marikina^{††}
- Muntinlupa^{†^{††}}
- Parañaque
- Pasig
- Quezon City^{†^{††}}
- San Juan
- Taguig
- Valenzuela
^{†} Provinces/cities with reported H1N1-related deaths.
^{††} Provinces/cities with H1N1 community outbreaks.

== See also ==
- COVID-19 pandemic in the Philippines
