= Treaty of Campo Formio =

1797 treaty during the War of the First Coalition

Treaty of Campo Formio between the French Republic and Austria Traité de Campo-Formio entre la République française et l'Autriche Frieden von Campo Formio zwischen der Französischen Republik und Österreich
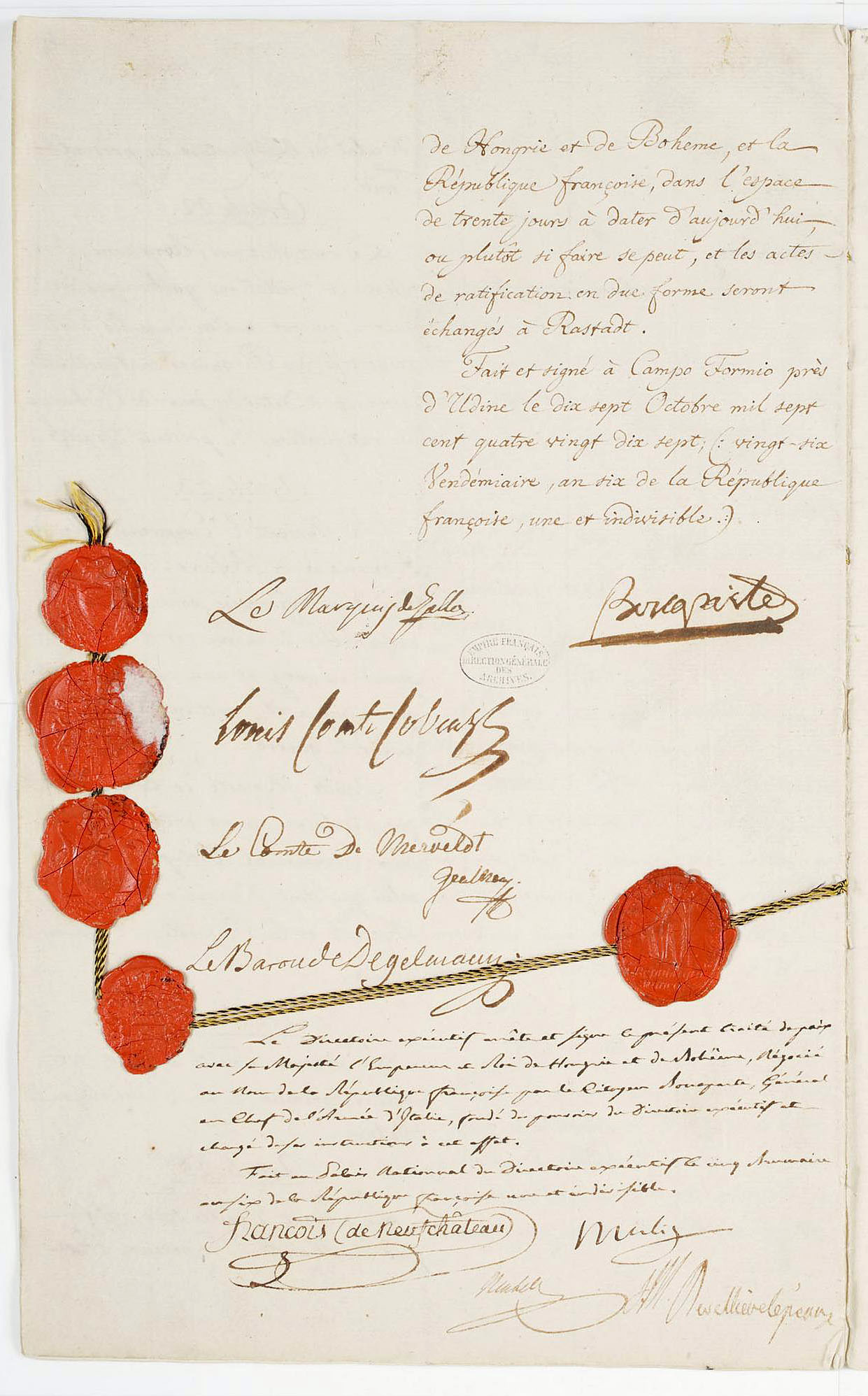
- Last page of the public part of the treaty
- Signed: 17 October 1797
- Location: Campoformido, Republic of Venice
- Signatories: Habsburg monarchy; French First Republic
- Depositary: Archives Nationales
- Language: French

The Treaty of Campo Formio was a peace treaty signed on 17 October 1797 between the French First Republic and Habsburg monarchy of Austria which ended the War of the First Coalition. France had been at war with Austria since 20 April 1792, when the French Legislative Assembly voted to declare war, which sparked the War of the First Coalition. Following several years of stalemate and inconclusive fighting along the Franco-Italian border, the French Revolutionary Army, under Divisional-general Napoleon Bonaparte, went on the offensive on 10 April 1796 against Austria and its Italian ally Sardinia. Bonaparte quickly won the lightning Montenotte campaign against Sardinia, which signed a peace treaty with France on 15 May. French commanders proceeded to focus their full attention on driving the Austrians out of Italy, and following several major defeats in Italy and Germany at French hands Austria signed the Peace of Leoben with Bonaparte on 18 April 1797.

Subsequent negotiations led to the signing of the Treaty of Campo Formio on 17 October, where Bonaparte signed for France and Philipp von Cobenzl for Austria. The treaty's public articles concerned only France and Austria and called for a Second Congress of Rastatt to be held to negotiate a final peace between the French and the Holy Roman Empire. It also confirmed the fall of the Republic of Venice which had been dissolved and partitioned by France and Austria. The treaty also contained secret articles in which Austria agreed to support certain French designs at the congress. Though the treaty left Great Britain as the last nation at war with France, Franco-Austrian tensions resulted the French declaring war on Austria on 12 March 1799 as part of the War of the Second Coalition.

== Location ==
Campo Formio, now called Campoformido, is a village west of Udine in the historical region of Friuli in north-eastern Italy, in the middle between Austrian headquarters in Udine and Bonaparte's residence. The French commander resided at Villa Manin, the country mansion of Ludovico Manin, the last Doge of Venice, near Codroipo. The treaty was signed in an old house in the main square of the village, property of Bertrando Del Torre, a local merchant.

On 18 January 1798, Austrian troops entered Venice, and three days later, they held an official reception at the Doge's Palace, where Ludovico Manin was a guest of honour.

== Terms ==
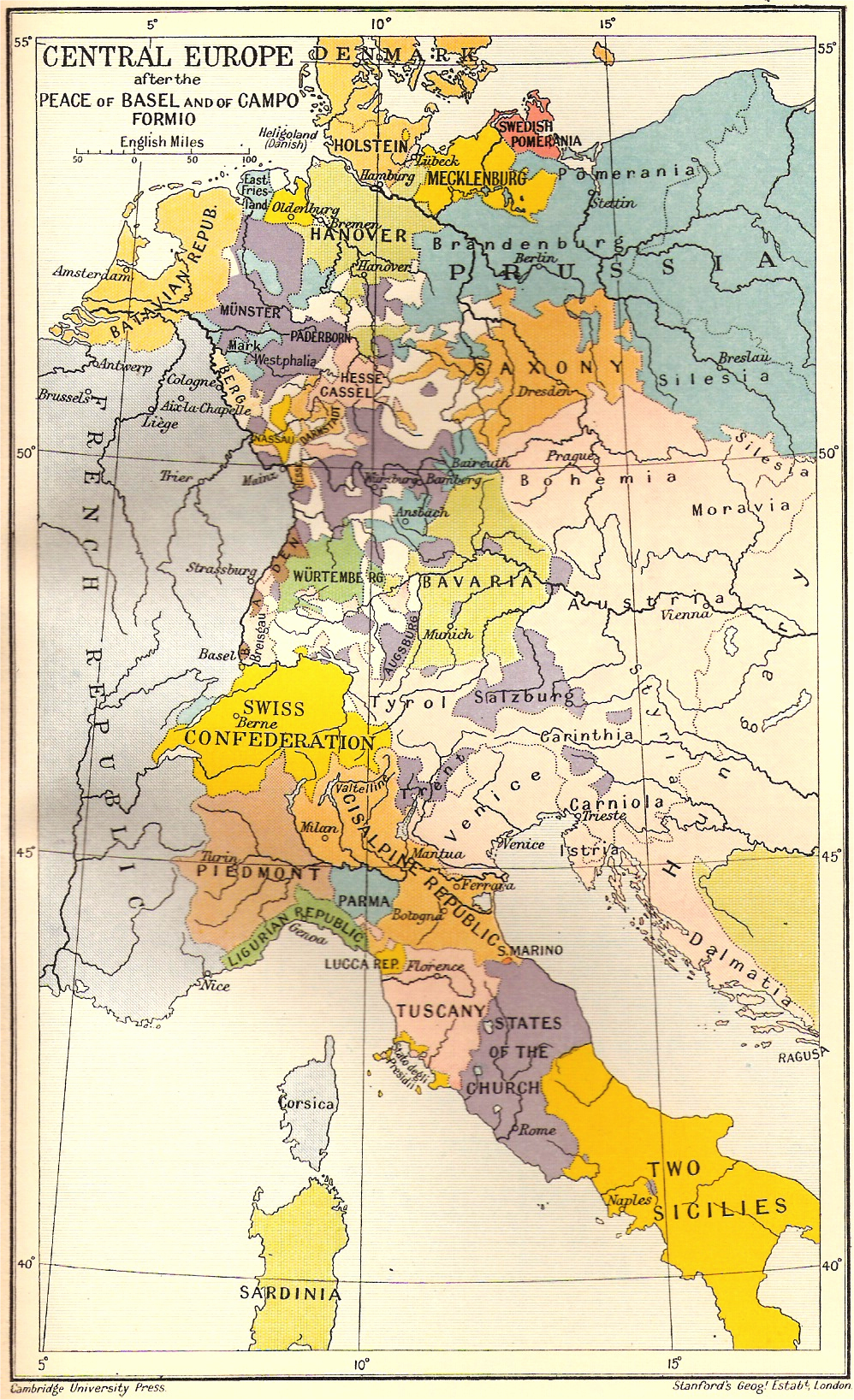
A map showing Central Europe after the Treaty of Campo Formio.

Beyond the usual clauses of "firm and inviolable peace", the treaty transferred a number of Austrian territories into French hands. Lands ceded included the Austrian Netherlands (most of modern Belgium). Territories of the Republic of Venice were divided between the two states: certain islands in the Mediterranean, including Corfu and other Venetian possessions in the Ionian Sea were turned over to the French.

The city of Venice with the Terraferma (Venetian mainland), Venetian Istria, Venetian Dalmatia and the Bay of Kotor region were turned over to the Habsburg emperor. Austria recognized the Cisalpine Republic and the newly created Ligurian Republic, formed of Savoyard state and Genoese territories, as independent powers.

The Italian states formally ceased to owe fealty to the Holy Roman Emperor, ending the formal existence of the Kingdom of Italy, which, as a personal holding of the emperor, had existed de jure but not de facto since at least the 14th century.

The treaty contained secret clauses signed by Napoleon and representatives of the Holy Roman emperor, which divided up certain other territories, and agreed to the extension of the borders of France up to the Rhine, the Nette, and the Roer. Free French navigation was guaranteed on the Rhine, the Meuse and the Moselle. The French Republic had been expanded into areas that had never before been under French control.

The treaty was composed and signed after five months of negotiations. Its terms largely reflected those agreed upon earlier in the Treaty of Leoben in April 1797, although the talks were prolonged by both parties for various reasons. During this period, the French had to suppress the Coup of 18 Fructidor, a Royalist uprising in September, which served as a pretext for the arrest and deportation of Royalist and moderate deputies from the Directory.

Napoleon's biographer, Felix Markham, wrote "the partition of Venice was not only a moral blot on the peace settlement but left Austria a foothold in Italy, which could only lead to further war." In fact, the Peace of Campo Formio, though it reshaped the map of Europe and marked a major step in Napoleon's fame, was only a respite. One consequence was the Peasants' War, which erupted in the Southern Netherlands in 1798 following the French introduction of conscription.

As a result of the treaty, Gilbert du Motier, Marquis de Lafayette, a prisoner from the French Revolution, was released from Austrian captivity.

By passing Venetian possessions in Greece, such as the Ionian Islands, to French rule, the treaty had an effect on later Greek history neither intended nor expected at the time.

== Sources ==
- Perocco, Guido & Antonio Salvadori (1986). Civiltà di Venezia, Volume 3: l'età moderna. Venezia: Stamperia di Venezia.
- Lefebvre, Georges (1964). The French Revolution, Volume II From 1793–1799. New York: Columbia University Press. ISBN 0-231-02519-X.
- Jones, Colin (2002). The Great Nation: France from Louis XV to Napoleon 1715–99. New York: Columbia University Press. ISBN 0-231-12882-7.
- Schroeder, Paul W. (1996). The Transformation of European Politics 1763–1848. Oxford University Press. ISBN 9780198206545.

Preceded by Battle of Neuwied (1797)	French Revolution: Revolutionary campaigns Treaty of Campo Formio	Succeeded by French invasion of Switzerland
