= Margherita Dalmet =

Dogaress of Venice

Dogaressa of Venice
- Tenure: 14 January 1779 – 13 February 1789
- Predecessor: Polissena Contarini Da Mula
- Successor: Elisabetta Grimani
- Born: c. 1739; Constantinople, Ottoman Empire
- Died: January 11, 1817 (aged 77–78); Venice, Austrian Empire
- Spouse: Bassi; Paolo Renier; Federico Bonlini
- Father: Giovanni Battista
- Religion: Roman Catholic

Giovanna Margherita Dalmet, also called Delmaz and Dalmaz (1739 – 11 January 1817), was a Dogaressa of Venice by marriage to the Doge Paolo Renier (r. 1779–1789).

== Life ==
=== Early life ===
Margherita was born in Constantinople as the daughter of the apothecary Giovanni Battista from Piemonte. She was a widow of a man by the name Bassi and active as a tight rope dancer in Constantinople, where she met Paolo Renier, who was there on a diplomatic mission between 1769 and 1773. Renier was by that time a widower after his first wife Giustina Donà (d. 1751), and they became lovers and married. According to another version, he had her placed to be educated in a Catholic orphanage for poor girls, after which they fell in love and married. Due to the dislike of the Venetian aristocracy of their marriage, it was not recorded in the Golden Book.

Secretary of State Giuseppe Gradenigo described the role of the new doges marriage in his election:

" At noon on Friday his Serene Excellency Paolo Renier's election was declared. The newly made prince must have spent much money. He has purchased the balle for more than fifteen zecchini each, and of these there are about three hundred. He started with the idea that it would be an easy matter, but whilst engaged in it he heard himself called a traitor to his country, deceitful, and married to a plebeian woman of bad character, formerly a rope-dancer – words which seemed to resound on all sides, and undoubtedly excited the people against him ... He was obliged to make a virtue of necessity, and to draw out a large number of those 90,000 zecchini that he is supposed to have made at Constantinople, in order to stop people's mouths. And in the end the public was fully satisfied. During three days' feasting in the Palace, money, bread, and wine were profusely distributed, and produced loud hurrahs and acclamations."

=== Dogaressa ===
Because of her past, she was not accepted by the Venetian aristocracy, who referred to her as La Falsa Dogaressa ('The False Dogaressa'). The candidacy of Andrea Tron to the office of Doge had been damaged by the scandals of his noble wife Caterina Tron, and Delmaz would have been even less accepted in the role of dogaressa, as she could not be inscribed in the Golden Book. Nevertheless, she was acknowledged as dogaressa and given the title as such. However she refrained nonetheless from playing that role in official ceremonies, and the representational duties of the dogaressa was performed by the niece of her spouse, Giustina Renier Michiel. In June 1786, she visited the waters of Recoaro in Valdagno as dogaressa under the treatment of Doctor Girolamo Festari.

As dogaressa, she let out the pavement of the della Paglia bridge, for artists' shops, and obtained 1,000 zecchini for letting the Priorato della Gadi Bio. Margherita was said to damage the reputation and popularity of the doge. Margherita is known for a story about her dislike of the sound of church bells: her consort allegedly paid the abbey near the doge palace not to ring the bells, and whenever he was late with the payment, the convent rang the bells.

Margherita was involved in a case of counterfeit as the accused. On 3 October 1786, during his stay in Venice, Goethe witnessed the public trial against her in the Ducal Palace. The case was about a deed of trust, and the lawsuit was against the Doge, but in reality against the dogaressa, who was in fact present on the bench of the accused, dressed in the robes of the dogaressa. Goethe describes her as "woman of a certain age, of a noble appearance; she had a handsome face, but a severe expression, and a certain air of melancholy!"

=== Later life ===
Margherita Dalmet was widowed in 1789, and left the Ducal Palace. She remarried the Venetian aristocrat Federico Bonlini who was reportedly her lover during her time as dogaressa, but the Venetian aristocracy again refused to record her marriage in the Golden Book. She evidently lived a peaceful life after the death of Renier. In her will of 1817 she left a great deal of her fortune to charity.

Preceded by Polissena Contarini Da Mula	Dogaressa of Venice; 1779–1789	Elisabetta Grimani
