= 2009 swine flu pandemic in the Philippines by region =

Outbreak evolution in the Philippines as confirmed or suspected by different agencies. (Note: Map may not show provinces with deaths confirmed to be A/H1N1 related as per the Department of Health. Reports reported by the media to be A/H1N1 related may conflict with DOH records.) (10:09, Wednesday, August 5, 2026 (UTC)) Provinces with confirmed cases

The 2009 flu pandemic in the Philippines began on May 21, 2009, when a young Filipina girl first contracted the A(H1N1) virus while in the United States. In the following days, several local cases were reported to be caused by contact with two infected Taiwanese women who attended a wedding ceremony in Zambales.

The 10-year-old Filipina girl arrived the country on May 18 and was hospitalized the day after at the Research Institute for Tropical Medicine in Muntinlupa. On May 21, Department of Health (DOH) secretary Francisco Duque confirmed the case being the first Philippine swine flu case.

On June 22, 2009, first fatality was reported, a 49-year-old female from Metro Manila, being also the first death in Asia associated with the disease. At the same time, the Department of Health assured that the patient did not die because of the novel virus, instead, due to heart attack. Later on, Philippine Congress learned that the woman was a regular employee of the House, and prompted the government to shut down the legislature for five days.

== Summary ==
Human Influenza A(H1N1) cases in the Philippines (By Region)
Cases		Deaths
Laboratory confirmed^{(DOH)}	Date of las confirmation^{(DOH)}	Confirmed deaths^{(DOH)}
3,207 (1,709)	July 30 (July 30)	9; 8
Regional breakdown^{‡}: / Confirmed cases / Deaths; Region I / 5 / 0; Region II / 1 / 0; CAR / 187 / 4; Region III / 248 / 0; NCR / 1, 255 / 4; Region IV-A / 251 / 0; Region IV-B / 10 / 0; Region V / 28 / 0; Region VI / 7 / 0; Region VII / 10 / 0; Region VIII / 42 / 1; Region IX / 1 / 0; Region X / 19 / 0; ARMM / 0 / 0; Region XI / 11 / 0; Region XII / 1 / 0; Caraga / 13 / 0; Non-DOH total / 1, 815 / 9^{‡} Figures per region is not tallied into independent news sources and DOH updates. This is a natural situation since DOH did not issued updates anymore.

== Luzon ==
Almost half of the western side of mainland Luzon was so far not infected by the influenza virus. The northern regions, Bicol Region and southern island of Luzon has no reported infections so far.

=== Metro Manila ===
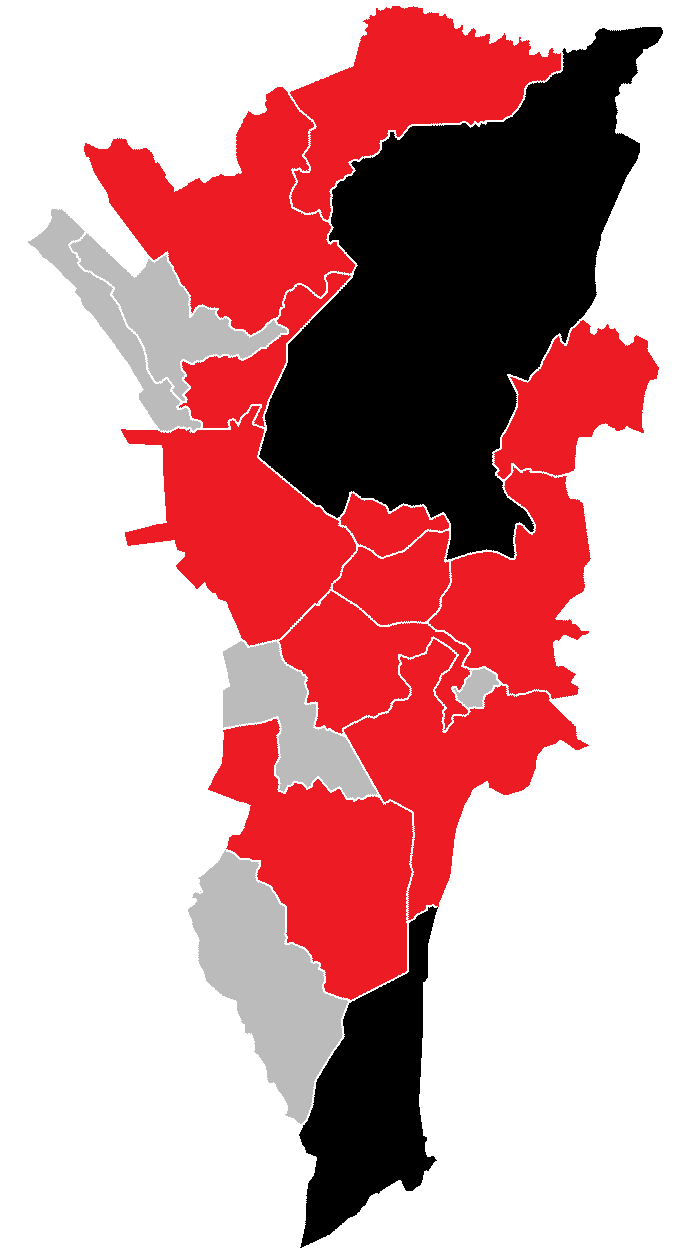
Outbreak evolution in the Metro Manila as confirmed or suspected by different agencies. Confirmed cases followed by death Confirmed cases by the Department of Health

Being the location of DOH authorized H1N1 hospital, Metro Manila reported its first influenza A(H1N1) case on May 22, 2009, in aligned with the first confirmed case in the Philippines. As the time progresses, Metro Manila has the highest number of influenza A(H1N1) cases compared to other locations on the country due to the vicinity of available hospitals to conduct respiratory swab tests. On May 18, 2009, a Filipina girl who arrived from the US was the first confirmed case of H1N1 virus in the Philippines. Health Secretary Duque said that the girl is in stable condition and is in quarantine.

Metro Manila had its second confirmed case of Influenza A(H1N1) virus infection (as well as in the country) being a 50-year-old patient who arrived in the country from the United States on May 20, 2009, showed symptoms of the dreaded flu, including coughs and fever. The patient is currently under observation at the Research Institute of Tropical Medicine (RITM) in Manila.

On June 3, 2009, a foreign exchange student in De La Salle University-Manila was confirmed with H1N1 virus and the school was closed for ten days starting June 4. The university then became the first school in the Philippines to shut down classes due to H1N1 infection. De La Salle then recorded the highest number of flu cases in Metro Manila schools.

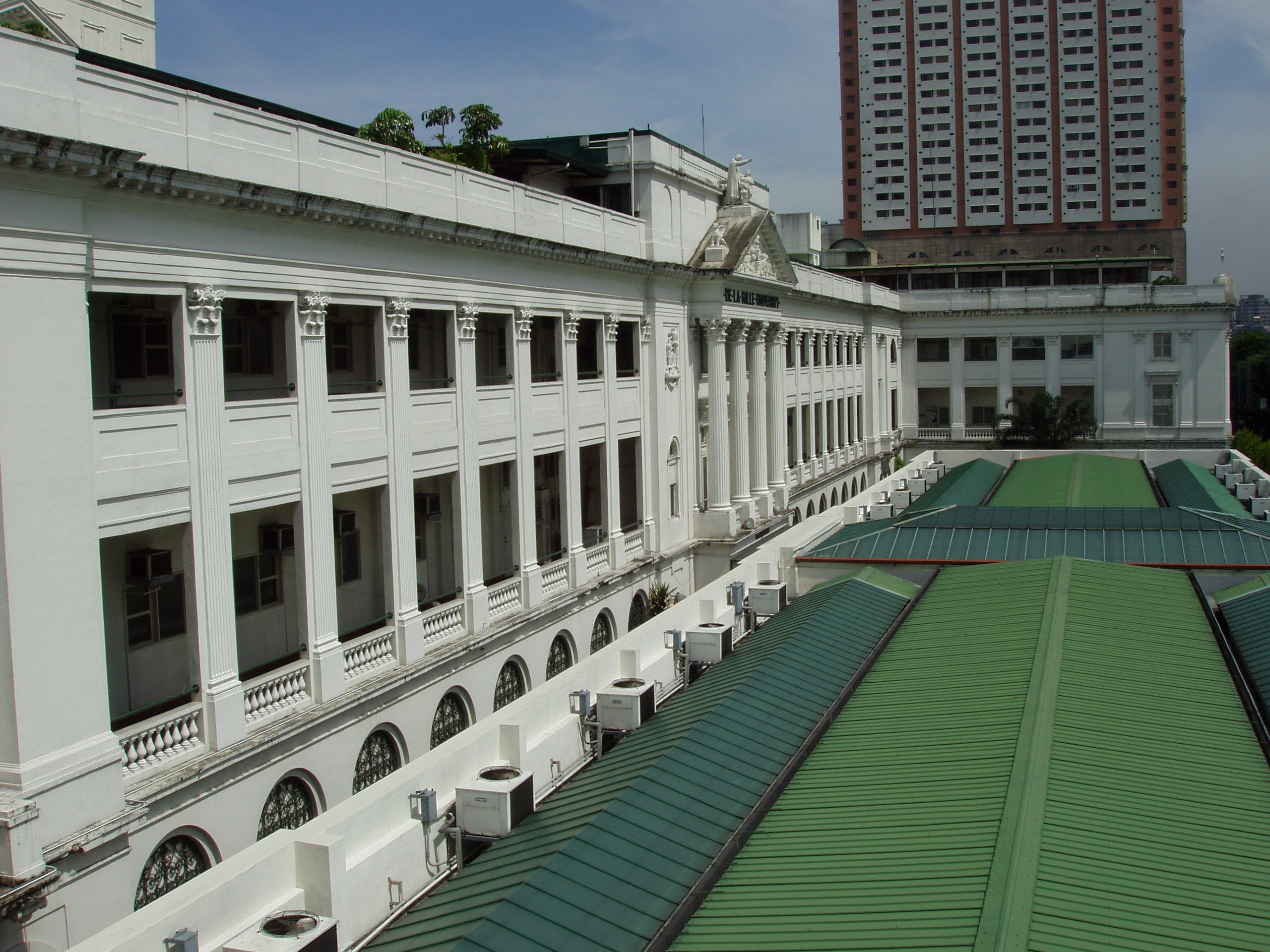
De La Salle University (Manila) was closed because of 15 students infected by A(H1N1) since June 3.

On June 4, 2009, the confirmed cases of A(H1N1) virus rose to 29, after another De La Salle-Manila student and a staff of the Asian Development Bank (ADB) were confirmed that they were infected with the virus. ADB office in Makati was then subjected for closure and quarantine was made to infected or possible contacted people.

On June 8, 2009, East Asia College of the Far Eastern University in Manila confirmed its first case which rose to three.

On June 9, 2009, Ateneo de Manila High School department reported that three of its students were tested positive of the flu. Classes were suspended immediately after. Six days after, on its sister Loyola school Ateneo de Manila University in Quezon City reported four flu infections. The same day, La Salle's sister college St. Benilde had its first flu case which eventually rose to two.

On June 10, 2009, St. Andrew's School in Parañaque suspended classes after a student was infected by flu.

On June 15, 2009, Quezon City had its first public school flu cases that started on a school: two of them are elementary school pupils of Lagro Elementary School in Lagro, Quezon City and the remaining three are high school students of Miriam College in Katipunan Avenue, Loyola Heights. The same day, city government of Makati announced that three students of Mapúa Institute of Technology Makati Campus was tested positive for H1N1 together with two residents in San Miguel Village and one in Cembo.

On June 17, 2009, San Juan City had its first flu case, a student in Dominican College. Senate President pro Tempore Senator Jinggoy Estrada announced June 24 that two of his children contracted flu virus, one in De La Salle and the other one in Xavier School (Greenhills), even though the latter school did not announce infection so far.

The same day, June 17, Don Alejandro Roces, Sr. Science and Technology High School, also in Quezon City confirmed first flu case after swab samples turned positive. Our Lady of Perpetual Succor College in Marikina also confirmed first influenza case. On June 18, 2009, first case in Mandaluyong school was reported in Lourdes School with two positive for flu.

On June 19, 2009, Adamson University in Manila suspended its classes due to confirmation of infection on one of its students.

On June 20, 2009, several schools announced flu infection: PAREF Southridge School in Muntinlupa, Reedley International School in Quezon City and San Beda College in Manila.

On June 21, 2009, virus reached Don Bosco Technical College in Mandaluyong. The same day, nearby school La Salle Green Hills announced flu infection. St. Scholastica's College in Manila also reported infection.

=== Cordillera Administrative Region ===
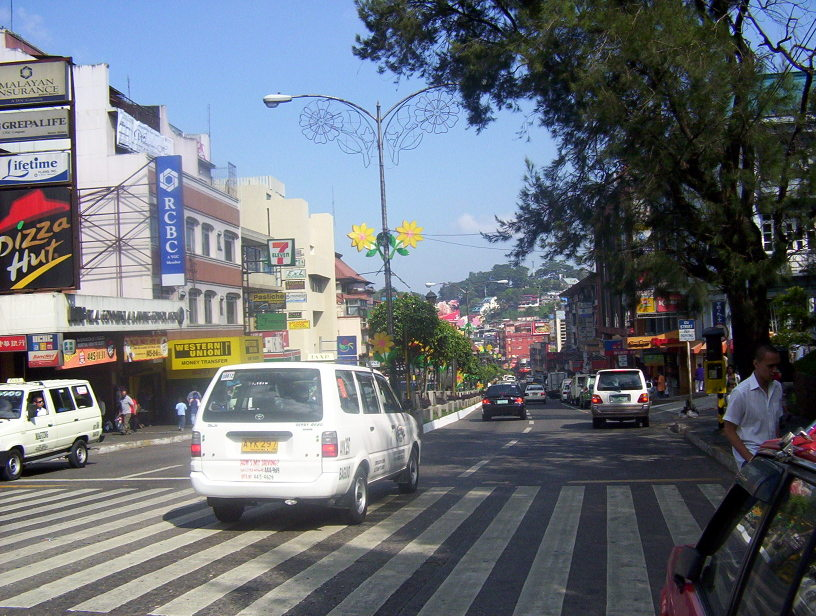
Part of a view in Baguio.

The DOH-Cordillera confirmed on May 29 its first swine flu case. Similar to other flu patients, the identity and disclosure of the sick person was not publicized to promote confidentiality. A day after, on May 30, second flu patient was confirmed by the DOH Cordillera director Myrna Cabotaje, a man around his twenties. On the other hand, Baguio City Health Officer Florence Reyes said that the referral centers in the region include the Baguio General Hospital and Medical Center, Benguet General Hospital, Abra Provincial Hospital, Far North Luzon General Hospital and Medical Center in Apayao, Ifugao Provincial Hospital, Kalinga Provincial Hospital, Bontoc General Hospital, and Luis Hora Memorial and Regional Hospital also in Bontoc.

On June 18, Cordillera cases rose to six, all of whom have history of travels to the United States and other flu-infected countries. Dr. Nick Gordo assured that there is no community level outbreak so far in the region.

Meanwhile, on June 26, 2009, Dr. Anthony Bantog, head of the livestock division of the Department of Agriculture said that there is no swine flu or hog cholera outbreak among Cordillera pigs, despite the rising number of cases in the region. He added, instead, that porcine reproductive and respiratory syndrome affects pigs.

On July 12, DOH Cordillera declared a low-level community outbreak of transmission all over Cordillera when its July 6 count of 14 rose to 47. Most of the cases came from Baguio. On the same hand, five of Baguio's universities temporarily closed their schools when students showed influenza-like illness and symptoms: St. Louis University, University of Baguio, Pines City Educational College, Baguio City National High School, and St. Louis Center.

On July 27, 2009, afternoon, DOH Cordillera Region announced four more A(H1N1)-related deaths: an infant, a child, a woman who had just given birth and a teenager died within the past week.

=== Ilocos Region ===
As of June 26, 2009, the only province in the region to report influenza cases is Pangasinan, with two confirmed infections last June 18.

=== Cagayan Valley ===
Cagayan Valley has recorded five positive A(H1N1) cases, regional health authorities based in this city said last July 8. Most of these cases, three from Cagayan and two from Isabela.

In Cagayan, a seven-year-old boy in Solana town was found positive of H1N1, bringing to nine the confirmed cases in Cagayan Valley.

Floro Orata, Department of Health-Cagayan Valley information officer, said the boy underwent swab test last week and the sample was sent to the Research Institute for Tropical Medicine in Manila. He later tested positive for the virus. The boy, who was on 10-day quarantine, reportedly contracted the virus from a relative who arrived from the United States.

Contact tracing operations to his relatives showed that there are no indications that other relatives also contracted the virus. Eight of the confirmed H1N1 cases in the region were in good health now.

=== Central Luzon ===
To date, all provinces in Central Luzon except Aurora have confirmed influenza A(H1N1) cases.

==== Nueva Ecija ====
Around May 28–29, 2009, around 29 students felt influenza-like illnesses at the same grade level in Hilera Elementary School, barangay Hilera (Jaen, Nueva Ecija). Six days later, on June 5, the students under observation rose to forty, so much that Jaen mayor Santiago Austria ordered suspension of classes. He also announced that the students are all in grade six level. National Epidemiology Center director Eric Tayag, on the other hand, increased the number of cases under observation in Hilera to 57, all of which are grade six pupils and the school principal of Hilera Elementary. On June 11, 2009, Department of Health confirmed first case of influenza in Nueva Ecija, an 11-year-old student from the same school.

A day after, 10 more children tested positive for the flu, nine of which are from the same school and another four-year-old toddler. Due to the fact that the first local influenza case in Central Luzon has no history of travel abroad nor close contact with the earlier cases, the DOH then speculated possible reasons how the student contracted the disease, One theory by local government of Nueva Ecija is that flu virus was transmitted by a member of a foreign medical mission, only known as Palanghay which conducted services on the school on May 31, and incubated into some students of the school. Philippine Daily Inquirer, on the other hand, reported that there are around 36 people quarantined (in Nueva Ecija) after they mingled and had closed contact in a wake with the 19-year-old girl tested positive for the disease; though the DOH never mentioned this possibility. Third possible theory was based on DOH Central Luzon director Rio Magpantay statement that the eleven-year-old boy possibly had flu infection during his summer vacation on the province of Bulacan.

After suspecting 92 influenza cases, the Department of Health on June 14 declared community outbreak in barangay Hilera, Jaen, Nueva Ecija. The community outbreak includes the Hilera-nearby barangays of Kalabasa, Pitak, Pakul and Lambakin. The outbreak declaration created generalized stigma to Hilera residents:

==== Zambales ====
On May 17, 2009, a wedding feast was conducted on the Central Luzon province of Zambales, with the DOH-estimated number of attendees around fifty. The occasion was said to be in a beach resort in the province. Two of the wedding attendees were Taiwanese nationals, a mother and her daughter, were found positive of the influenza virus when upon arrival in Taipei. In the successive, DOH tracked the location of the remaining guests through contact tracing, where they found around ten more positive for the flu.

Later, DOH Central Luzon Director Dr. Rio Magpantay said that the total attendees were around eighty, contrary to the previously reported around 50. Other news sources claimed that it was not a wedding occasion, but a yoga seminar instead, where around a hundred foreign nationals attended.

On June 28, 2009, seven Philippine Navy soldiers were tested positive for the influenza. According to Lieutenant Colonel Edgard Arevalo upon press conference in Camp Aguinaldo in Quezon City, these soldiers may contracted the novel disease when spending their vacation. Defense secretary Gilbert Teodoro, Jr., on the other hand, believes that one of the infected soldiers might have caught the virus when he attended a wedding in Zambales province, where two Taiwanese had also contracted the disease in May.

=== Calabarzon ===
==== Rizal ====
On June 19, 2009, classes at the Karangalan Elementary School in Cainta, Rizal province were canceled when 43 of its students and three faculty members exhibited flu-like symptoms. Due to this, the town government was urged to order the release of P5 million in calamity funds to be used for the purchase of anti-flu vaccines, face masks, alcohol, and other equipment. On June 21, swab tests of the suspected patients arrived from Research Institute for Tropical Medicine, which confirmed that two of the students have influenza, thus making Cainta be the first municipality in Rizal province to report influenza case. On the same hand, Cainta mayor Ramon Ilagan cited that there were earlier cases of A(H1N1) on the town, one being a high school student from Greenland Executive Village in San Juan, and his mother who apparently caught the disease from him.

==== Quezon ====
On July 7, 2009. The Maryhill College confirmed its first A(H1N1) virus case in Lucena City.

On July 14, 2009. 6 of 72 students that shows the symptoms of the Influenza A(H1N1) underwent the swab test and the result came out as positive.

=== Mimaropa ===
To date, majority of Mimaropa provinces has no confirmed infections yet.

On July 18, 2009, around 132 students of Managpi Elementary School in Managpi, Calapan, Oriental Mindoro, mysteriously felt ill. The next day, in a radio interview with Calapan mayor Paulino Salvador Leachon ordered schools officials of Managpu ES to temporarily close classes until July 26, where at the same day, 5 of its students were confirmed to have A(H1N1). Four days later, additional five cases were confirmed by the DOH Mimaropa Regional Director Dr. Gloria Balboa and city health officer Dr. Basilisa Llanto, two of them came from J.J. Leido National High School and three from Adriatico Elementary School. This prompted the city mayor and the council to declare suspension of classes among levels in Calapan and to resume August 1, as more and more children acquire the disease (though no other figures provided). At the same day, all of Calapan under state of calamity as a mysterious fever downed around 400 students there.

=== Bicol Region ===
On July 13, 2009, classes were suspended in Philippine Science High School in Goa, Camarines Sur when 70 of its 300 dormers exhibited some influenza-like illnessess. Three days later, local government officials from Goa denied that an influenza A(H1N1) infected the school, but was a seasonal flu instead. Furthermore, the toll of students infected with the seasonal flu rose to 96.

== Visayas ==
Visayas group islands has the most number of provinces infected in terms of geographical extent. Provinces that do not have flu cases so far include Aklan, Antique, Biliran, Guimaras, Eastern Samar, Negros Oriental, Northern Samar, Siquijor and Southern Leyte.

== Mindanao ==
There are some parts of Mindanao which are affected from the virus.

=== Zamboanga Peninsula ===
On July 2, 2009. The Ateneo de Zamboanga University confirmed its first A(H1N1) virus case in Zamboanga City. University President Fr. Antonio Moreno said that the grade 4 student had contacted with a relative who was found positive of the illness in Manila. Due to this incident, Fr. Moreno announced its suspending the classes at the elementary level of the university starting this Friday, July 3, until July 13.

=== Northern Mindanao ===
There are at least 10 confirmed cases in Northern Mindanao. Two are from Cagayan de Oro City, and six are soldiers training in a local military camp from Malaybalay City, Bukidnon. The other two are confirmed in Cotabato City and Ozamis City. On June 28, 2009, DOH confirmed that all these 10 patients had fully recovered.

On July 15, 2009, there are 9 confirmed cases of A(H1N1) virus from Xavier University - Ateneo de Cagayan. 8 are High School students from Xavier University - Ateneo de Cagayan High School in Pueblo de Oro and 1 is a faculty of Xavier University-Ateneo de Cagayan Main Campus. All are now undergoing confined treatment and are now recovering. All classes of all levels in all four campuses of the university are suspended for 10 days starting from July 16, 2008 (July 15, 2009 for XUHS) and will resume on July 27, 2009.

On the same date, there are also suspected cases from Pilgrim Christian College to have the virus and are now undergoing the swab test according to Cagayan de Oro's Committee on Health and Social Services Chairman Dr. Dante Pajo.

On July 17, 2009, Lourdes College and Corpus Christi School of Cagayan de Oro City suspended classes, fearing that their personnel would be exposed to infected students. Furthermore, some of the students are experiencing with the symptoms of the virus and currently waiting for the results of the swab tests conducted.

=== Davao Region ===
During the course of the pandemic, no cases have been confirmed in the Davao Region.

=== Soccsksargen ===
The first case in the region was a woman in Kidapawan City who visited her OFW husband in Manila. The husband, however is negative of the virus.

=== Caraga ===
On June 22, 2009, Mindanao has its first confirmed flu infection when a four-year-old boy who visited his working mother in Hong Kong tested positive for the disease. The child developed a fever and cough after arriving with his parents from a vacation in Hong Kong on June 13. The boy's location was revealed to be in the independent city of Butuan inside the province of Agusan del Norte.

Three days later, on June 25, the same city, Butuan, confirmed another case, a nine-year-old girl who had close contact with the first case in Butuan. The patient was then rushed into the Davao Medical Center.

=== Autonomous Region in Muslim Mindanao ===
During the course of the pandemic, no cases have been confirmed in the Autonomous Region in Muslim Mindanao.
