= Liberale Cozza =

Italian painter (1768–1821)

Liberale Cozza (20 July 1768 – 26 May 1821) was an Italian painter, active mainly in his native Venice, but also in Brescia in a Neoclassical style.

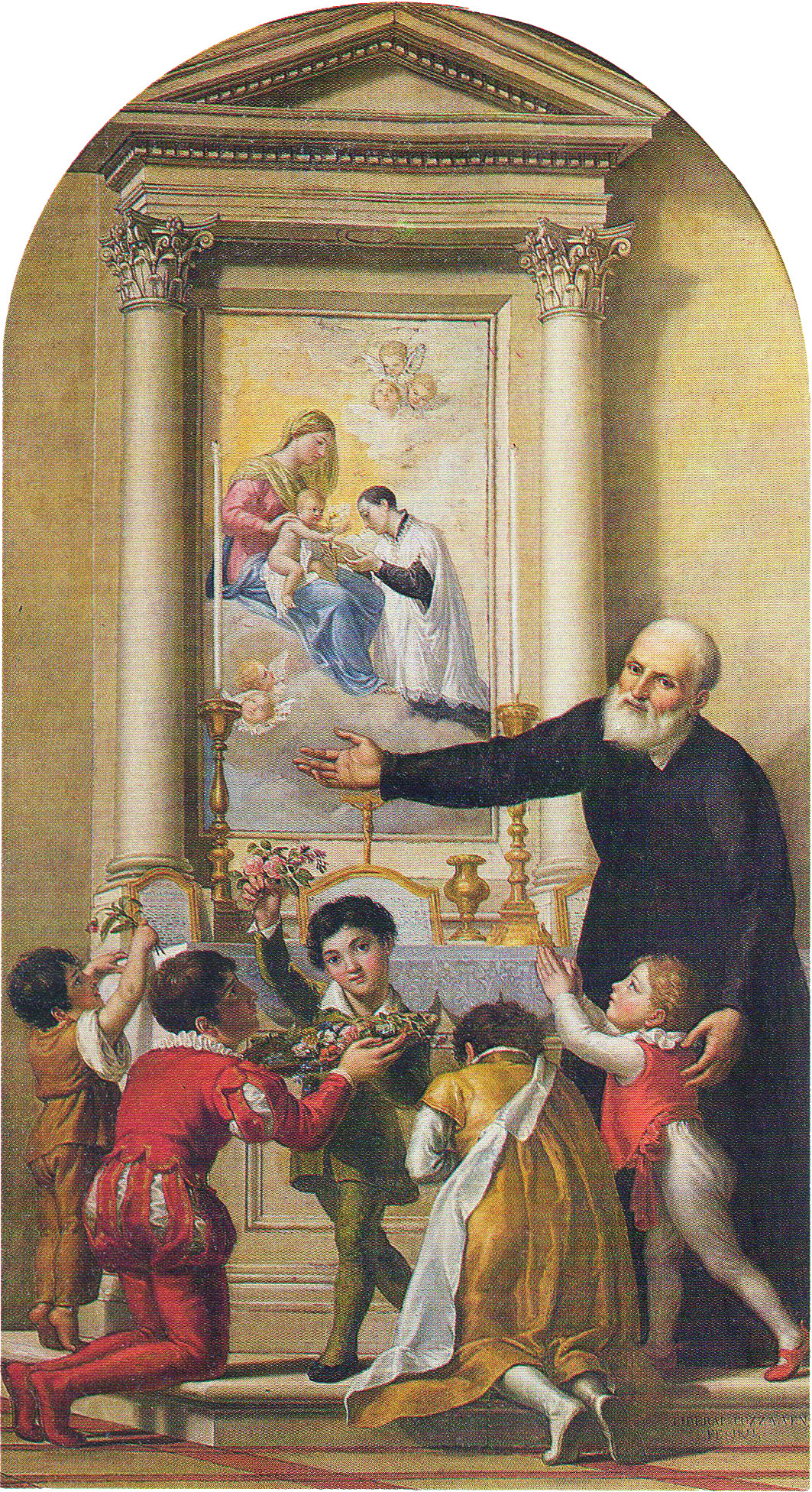
St Phillip Neri invites the children to venerate the Madonna (1811) Church of San Giacomo, Brescia.

== Biography ==
He learned early from Giovanni Tosolini, but was mainly self-trained. He painted landscapes and historic, mythologic, and religious subjects.

He was mainly active in the Veneto. One of his pupils was a young Lodovico Lipparini. Cozza painted a St Urban converts the Pagans (1798), now in the Museo Diocesano of Padua. He painted a St Ignatius of Loyola (Stanislao Kotska?) and Louis Gonzaga for the church of San Fantino, Venice, a St Louis Gonzaga for San Tomasso, Venice, and in Villa a Caldaro in Brescia. He was commissioned along with Antonio Canova, Francesco Hayez, Giovanni De Min, Lattanzio Querena, and others to create artworks in honor of the marriage of the Francis I Emperor of Austria with Caroline Augusta; Cozza painted a Banquet of Asaheurus.
