= Ludovico Manin =

Last Doge of Venice from 1789 to 1797

Lodovico Manin
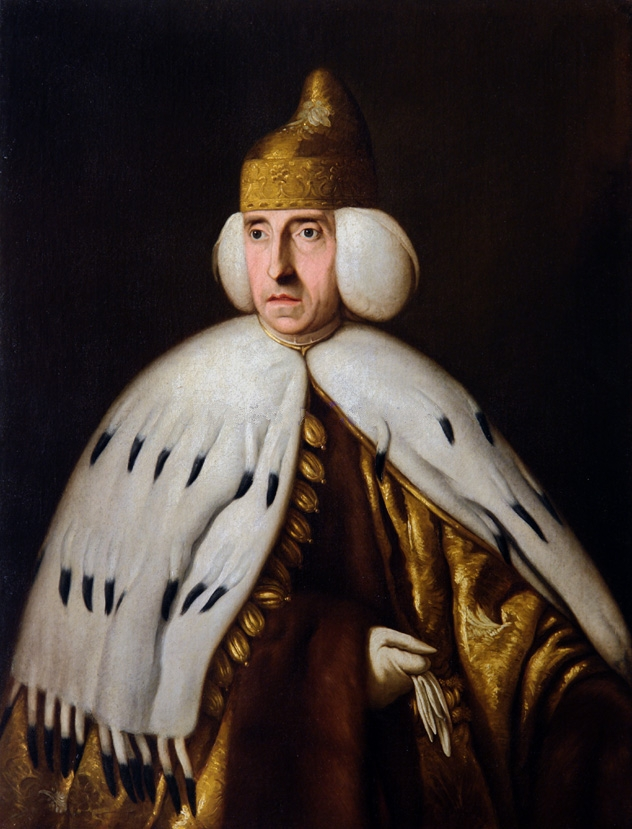
- Lodovico Manin, portrait by Bernardino Castelli

Doge of Venice
- Reign: 10 March 1789 – 12 May 1797
- Predecessor: Paolo Renier
- Successor: Position abolished (Fall of Venice, annexation to the Habsburg Empire)
- Born: Lodovico Giovanni Manin; 14 May 1725; Venice, Republic of Venice
- Died: 24 October 1802 (aged 77); Venice, Habsburg Empire
- Burial: Church of the Scalzi, Venice, Italy
- Spouse: Elisabetta Grimani (m. 1748; died 1792)
- Father: Lodovico Alvise Manin
- Mother: Maria Basadonna
- Religion: Roman Catholicism
- Occupation: Merchant

Lodovico Giovanni Manin (Italian: [ludoˈviːko maˈnin]; Venetian: Lodovigo Xuane Manin [lodoˈviɡo maˈniŋ]; 14 May 1725 – 24 October 1802) was a Venetian politician, patrician, and the 120th and last Doge of Venice. He governed the Venetian Republic from 9 March 1789 until its fall on 12 May 1797, when he was forced to abdicate by Napoleon Bonaparte. He officially left the Doge's Palace two days later on 14 May 1797.

== Biography ==
=== Early life ===
Lodovico Manin was the eldest of five sons of Lodovico III Alvise (1695–1775) and Lucrezia Maria Basadonna, the great-granddaughter of cardinal Pietro Basadonna. He attended the University of Bologna and was a boarder at the noble College of St. Xavier. Manin printed propositions of natural law, which he studied during this period. When Manin began public life he was quickly noticed for his generosity, honesty, kindness, and wealth. He married Elisabetta Grimani (d 1792) on 14 September 1748; he received a dowry of 45,000 ducats. Elisabetta had been educated in a monastery in Treviso and was in poor health since childhood. She did not give birth to any children.

At 26 he was elected captain of Vicenza, then of Verona, where he had to cope with a flood in 1757, and finally Brescia. In 1764, he was appointed procurator de ultra of Saint Mark's Basilica. Fond of religious meditations, in 1769 he asked and obtained permission to not hold an office because of ill health and bad hearing. In 1787, he was chosen to honor Pope Pius VI as he crossed the possessions of Venice and the Pope rewarded him with a knighthood.

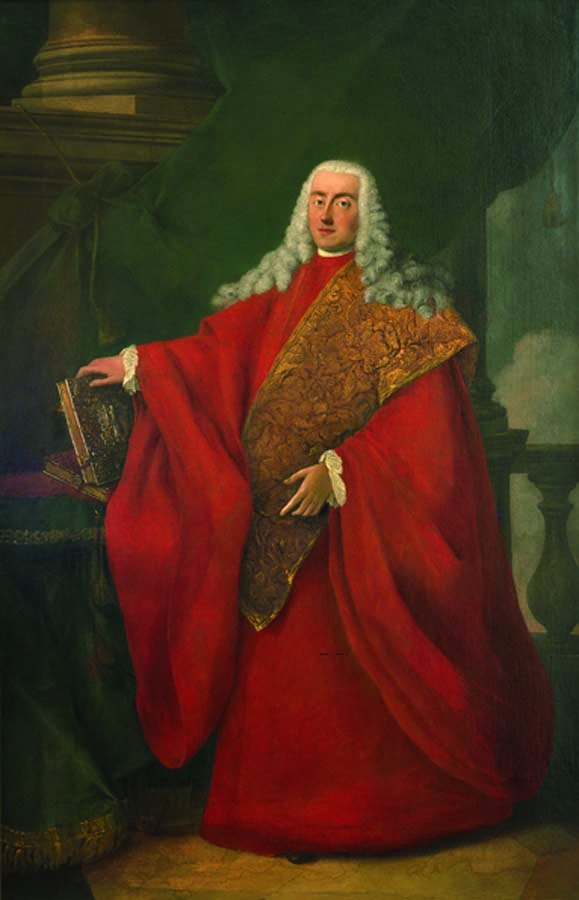
Manin in 1764

As the eldest son, he owned the Villa Manin di Passariano which was later inherited by his nephew, Lodovico Leonardo I (1771–1853). Lodovico Leonardo was the son of his brother Giovanni (1736–1774) and Caterina (Pesaro), the heiress of a wealthy noble Israelite family who claimed to descend from Cyrus the Great.

=== Doge ===
Lodovico was elected Doge of Venice on 9 March 1789, the same year that would see the start of the French Revolution a few months later, on the first ballot (the electoral assembly was composed of 41 members). His traditional coronation ceremony required him to throw coins to the Venetians, which cost more than 458,197 Lira, less than a quarter of which was paid from the funds of the Republic of Venice, the rest coming out of his own pocket. By the year 1792, the Republic had reduced in power and importance an trade and the once great Venetian merchant fleet had declined to a mere 309 merchantmen.

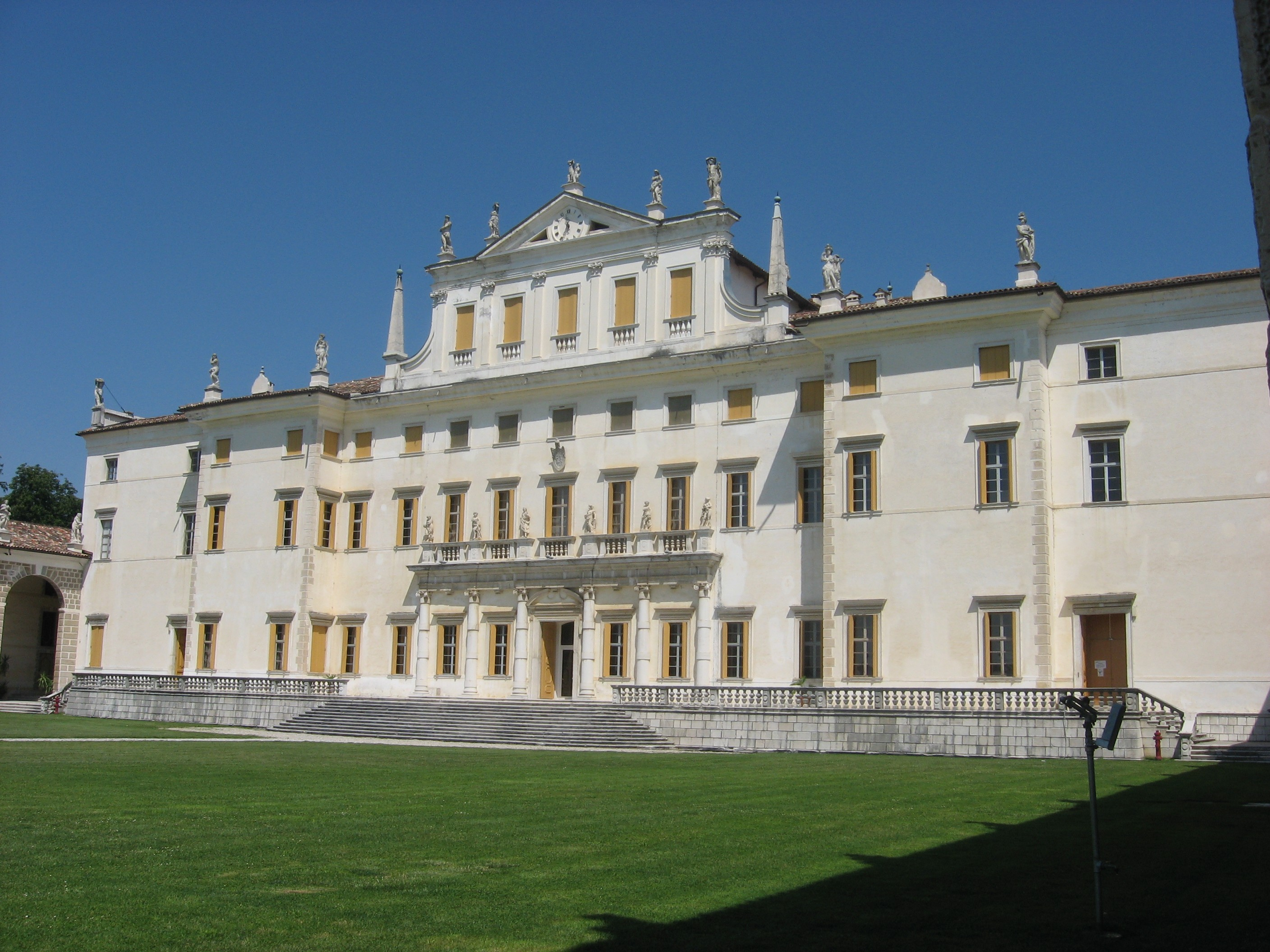
Villa Manin, in Passariano, where the Treaty of Campoformio was signed.

When Napoleon invaded Italy, Venice, along with the Republic of Genoa, did not initially join the coalition of Italian states formed in 1795, instead maintaining neutrality. On 15 April 1797, French general Jean-Andoche Junot gave the Doge an ultimatum which he refused. A secret addition to the Treaty of Leoben, signed on 17 April 1797, gave Venice, alongside Istria and Dalmatia, to Austria. On 25 April 1797, the French fleet arrived at the Lido. Venetian cannons sank one of the ships, but did not succeed in repelling the invasion since the Venetian war fleet numbered only 4 galleys and 7 galliots. The Doge surrendered on 12 May 1797 and left the Doge's Palace two days later.

On 16 May, French troops entered Piazza San Marco and the surrender contract was officially signed, submitting Venice to French rule.

=== Later life and death ===
Following his abdication, Manin refused an offer to become the interim head of the municipality and withdrew from society. Manin resided in the Palazzo Dolfin Manin, reportedly refusing even to answer his door to friends. He returned the ducal insignia (principally the distinctive ducal crown known as the corno ducale) alongside the "Golden Book" that served as a register of the oligarchical families of Venice to the Piazza San Marco, where they were hidden by the new city authorities.

For health reasons, he was forced to walk outside frequently and was sometimes made the object of insults from citizens. These accusers lamented Venice's changed fortunes and his decision to surrender to France. He wanted to end his days in a monastery, but this proved impossible.

Lodovico died in his villa of dropsy and heart problems on 24 October 1802. His will ordered that his funeral should take place "with the least possible pomp". His remains were interred in the chapel of the Church of the Scalzi in Venice, near the present railway station of Venice Saint Lucia in the family tomb of Manin where his late wife already lay. The tomb slab survives and bears the simple inscription Manini Cineres ("ashes of Manin").

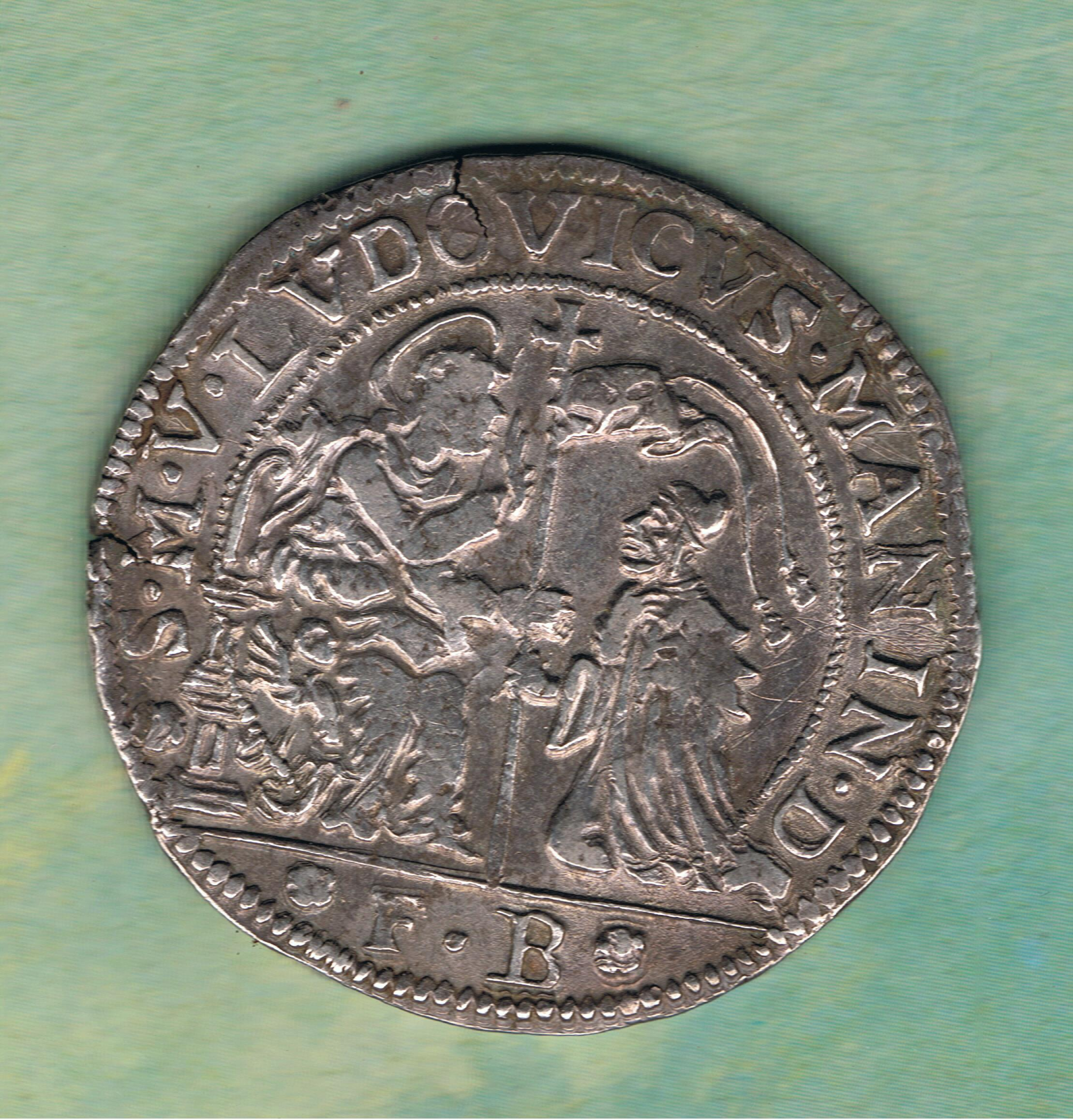
Ducatus Venetus, Venetian ducat, of the reign of Manin.

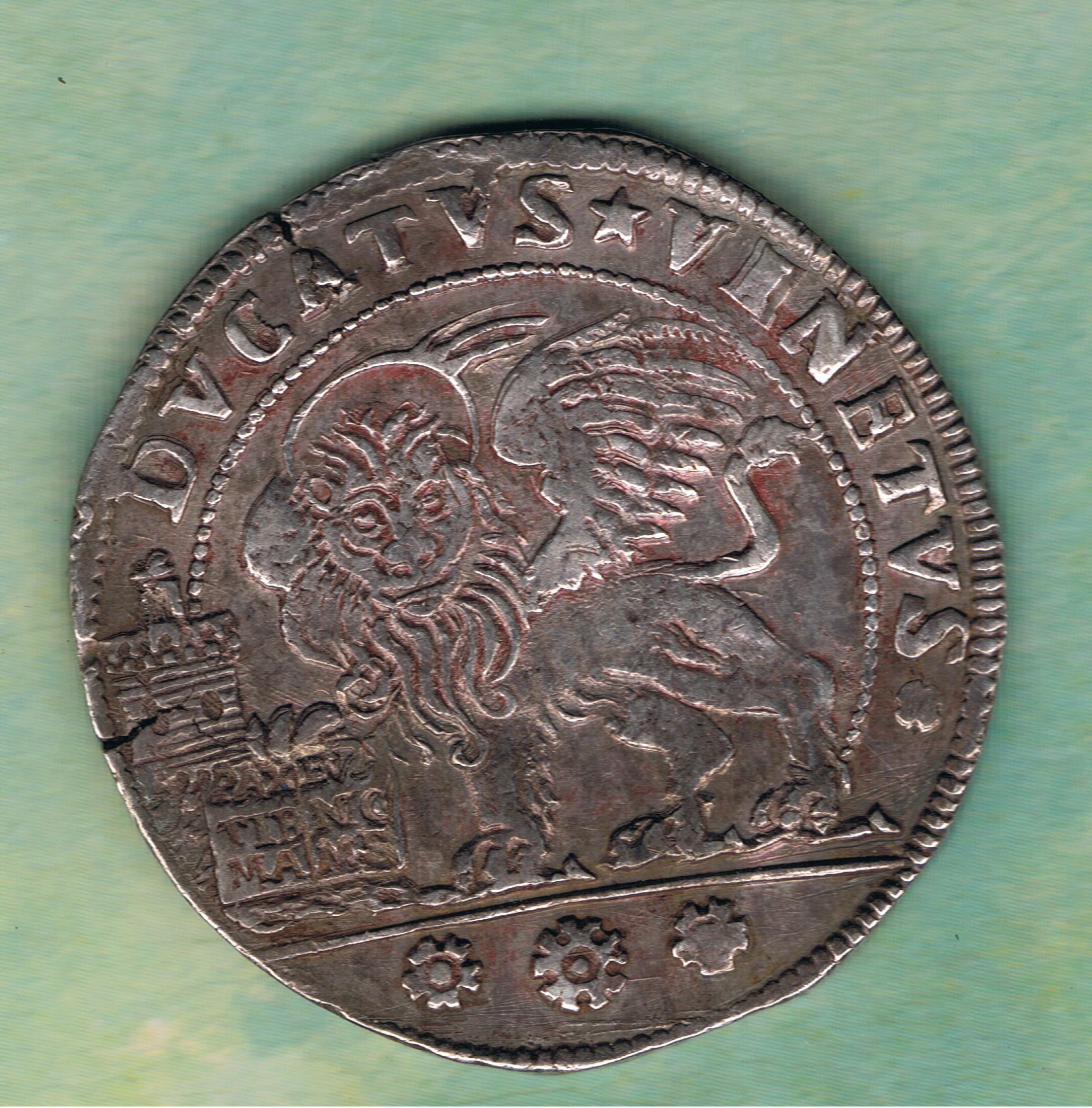
Venetian ducat, of the reign of Manin (San Marco side).

== Work ==
- Lodovico Manin. Memorie del dogado, preface and notes by Attilio Sarfatti, Venice, 1886 (in Italian)

== See also ==
- Fall of the Republic of Venice

Political offices
Preceded by Paolo Renier	Doge of Venice; 1789–1797	Office abolished
