= Oratio Imperata =

Catholic prayer set

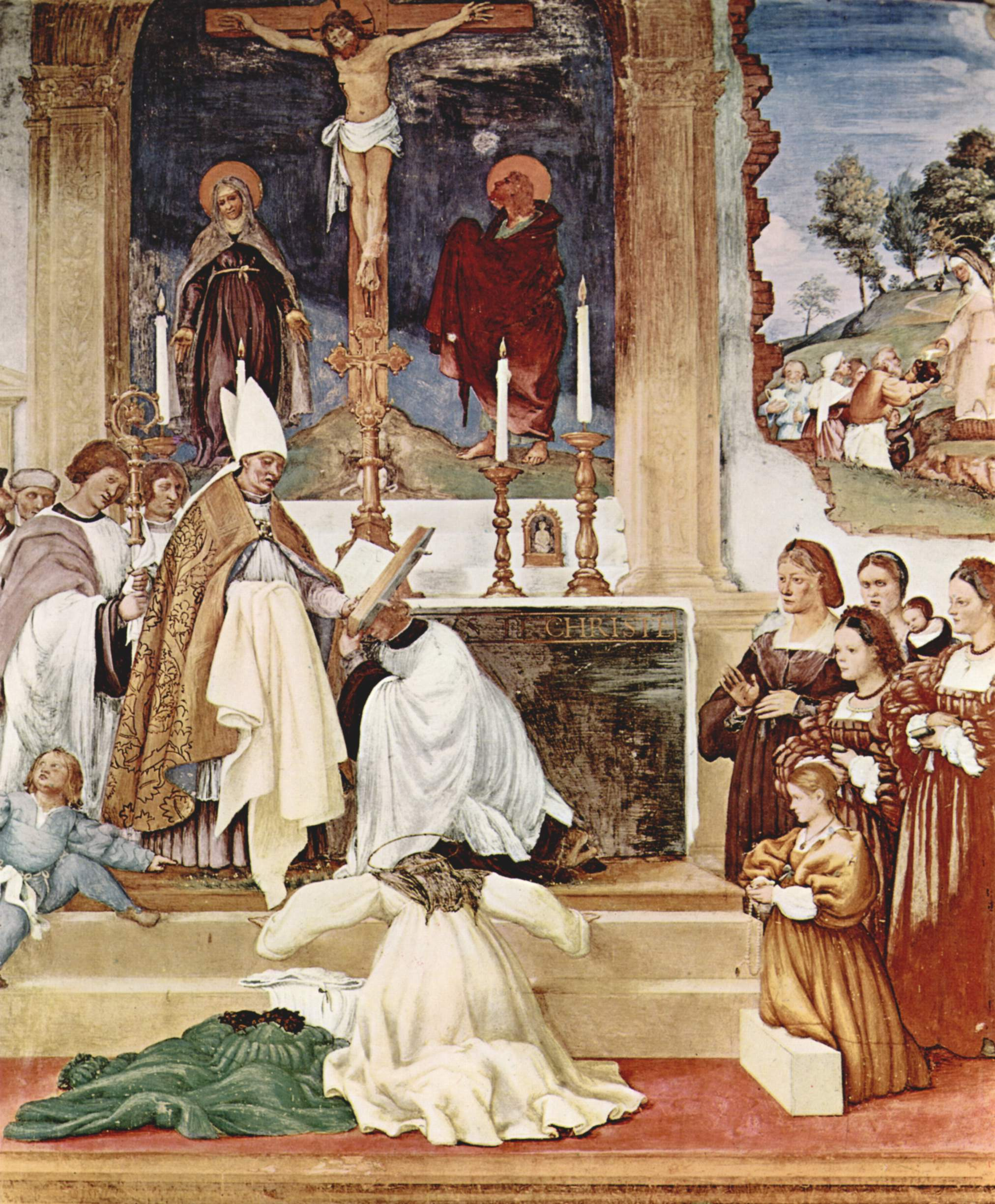
Invocative prayers said by a Catholic bishop. Fresco by Italian Artist Lorenzo Lotto, Suardi, Italy, c. 1524.

Oratio Imperata (Latin, "Obligatory Prayer") is a set of Roman Catholic invocative prayers consisting of the liturgical action and a short, general prayer in which the local ordinary or prelate of the church may publicly pray when a grave need or calamity occurs.

Common reasons for the religious invocation of the prayer are natural calamities such as storms, snow and drought while rare circumstances which merit the prayer are wars, plague and the disruption of public peace in society. The prayers are customarily invoked by an archdiocese on behalf of overwhelming popular requests, and is authorised by a high-ranking prelate or Metropolitan Archbishop.

== History ==
The customary tradition of reciting such prayers is rooted in Apostolic age, when lay people asked the help and assistance of their bishops in the time of natural calamity, war, or any grave public danger to society. In the Middle Ages, various saints (e.g. Saint Isidore the Farmer) were invoked for the assistance of granting rain, while Saint Roch was invoked for dire calamities and the Black Plague.

Present Catholic discipline allows that any collect prayers from the Mass may be prescribed by the local ordinary as this type of prayer. The prayer itself cannot be a permanent religious recitation, but rather only for used for a short period of time of need. The prayers are often recited postcommunion or after the conclusion or final benediction of the Mass. When the prayer itself is asked, composed, or canonically authorized by the Pope, it can also merit a plenary indulgence.

The invocative prayers prescribed as Oratio Imperata:

- Must only be composed of one, singular prayer
- Must be primarily addressed to a personage of the Holy Trinity, not directly to any interceding angel, saint, or a title of the Blessed Virgin Mary
- Must be prayed and recited by all Catholic priests celebrating Holy Mass in their respective churches and oratories, as well as exempted ones of the diocese
- Can never be said under a single conclusion with the collect of the Mass, but after the Mass is concluded;
- Is prohibited on all first and second classes of liturgical days, in votive Masses of the 1st and 2nd class, in sung Masses, and when they all have been met on that particular day.
- An oratio imperata for the deceased is said only on Ferias of the Fourth Class and in low votive or Requiem Masses of Class IV.

In very rare cases of enduring public calamities lasting a longer time, (i.e. national war, calamitous plague, etc.), the local ordinary may indeed impose a suitable Oratio Imperata for an extended period:

- May only be recited during Mondays, Wednesdays, and Fridays.
- Is prohibited on the same days twice, or on the same days coinciding with relevant liturgical days.

== Difficulty of approval ==
At times, the approval to recite the prayers on a diocesan level has been known to be difficult to obtain, usually causing the faithful to rather demand in large numbers to an archdiocese to release an Oratio Imperata. The most commonly authorized prayer is Oratio Imperata Ad Fluviam Petendam, in hopes of asking for rain in times of severe drought. Another one is Oratio Imperata Ad Calamitam et Bellonam, for casualties of war.

In the Philippines, the release of such prayers is often requested during the monsoon season, and their issuance by high-ranking prelates, such as the Archbishop of Manila and the Archbishop of Cebu, is primarily reported in various national media outlets. Obligatory prayers were also instructed by the Catholic Bishops' Conference of the Philippines to be recited during the COVID-19 pandemic on selected regional radio and television stations as well as amidst escalating geopolitical tensions in the South China Sea.

Within the Archdiocese of Los Angeles in June 2008, a special prayer for the request of more priestly vocations merited the request for the prayers, recited post-communion during Sunday Masses in the San Fernando Valley but was prohibited in being prayed during weekly masses.

== See also ==
- Ferias
- Novena
- Intercession
- Divine Praises
