= Paolo Renier =

Doge of Venice from 1779 to 1789

- Paolo Renier, painted by Lodovico Gallina c. 1779

Doge of Venice
- In office 1779–1789
- Preceded by: Alvise Giovanni Mocenigo
- Succeeded by: Ludovico Manin

Personal details
- Born: 21 November 1710 Venice, Republic of Venice
- Died: 13 February 1789 (aged 78) Venice
- Spouse(s): Giustina Dona (d 1751); Margherita Delmaz (d 1817)

Paolo Renier (21 November 1710 – 13 February 1789) was a Venetian statesman, the 119th Doge of Venice, and penultimate, from 1779 until his death. He was a noted orator, and served as ambassador to the Ottoman Empire and to Austria. His election as Doge was unpopular, and he was the subject of numerous menacing letters at the time. Renier was succeeded as Doge by Ludovico Manin, who would be the last Doge of Venice. He married Giustina Donà (d. 1751) in 1733, and Margherita Delmaz (d. 1817) in 1751. Through his brother, Daniele, he is the great-granduncle of Michelangelo Celesia.

== Sources ==
- Cuhaj, George S., ed. (2009). Standard Catalog of World Gold Coins 1601–Present (6 ed.). Krause. ISBN 978-1-4402-0424-1.

Political offices
Preceded by Alvise Giovanni Mocenigo	Doge of Venice; 1779–1789	Succeeded by Ludovico Manin
