= Marino Morosini =

Doge of Venice from 1249 to 1253

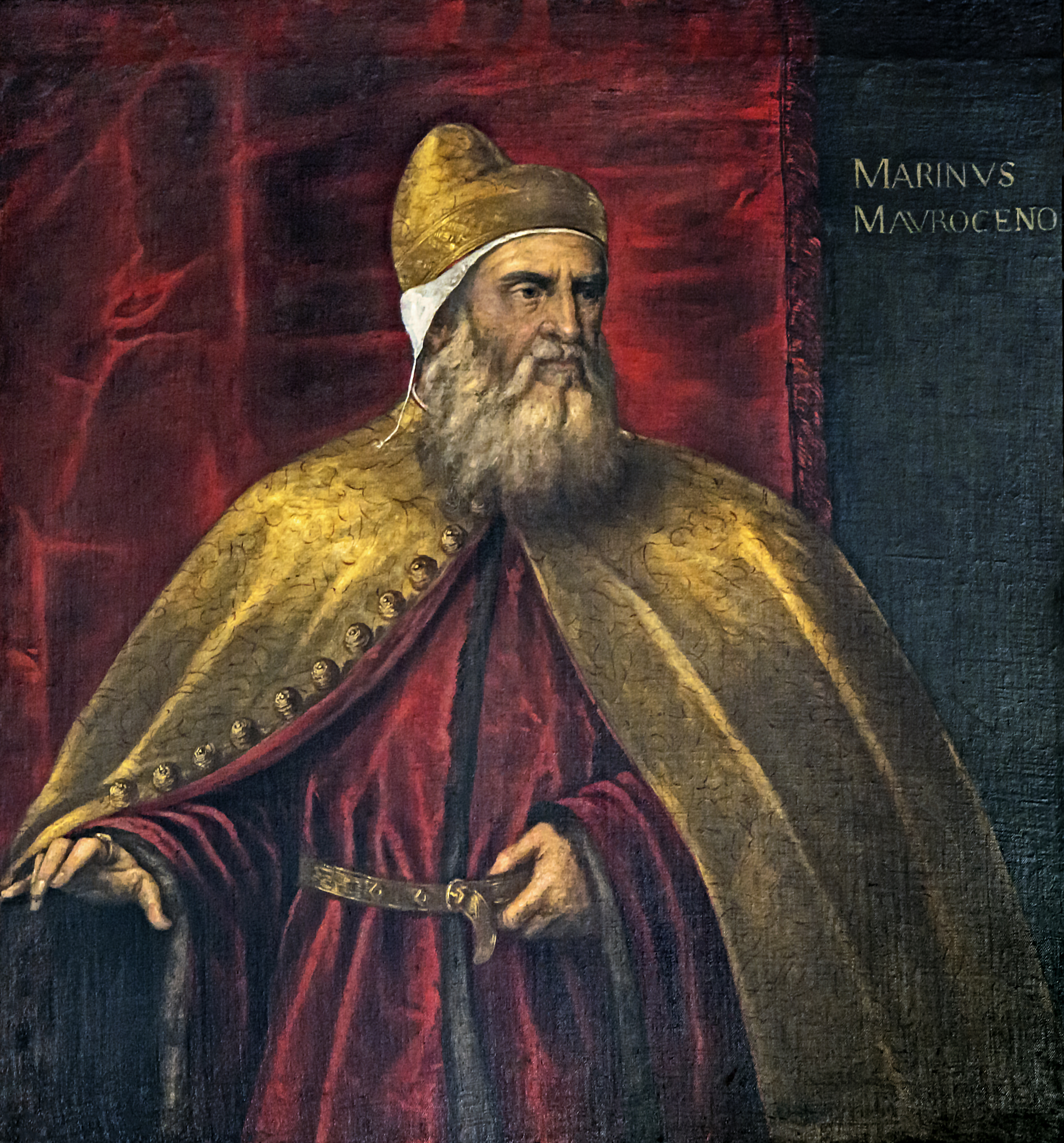
- Marino Morosini by Palma il Giovane

Doge of Venice
- In office 1249–1253
- Preceded by: Jacopo Tiepolo
- Succeeded by: Reniero Zeno

Personal details
- Born: 1181 Venice, Republic of Venice
- Died: 1 January 1253 (aged 71–72) Venice, Republic of Venice
- Resting place: St. Mark's Basilica

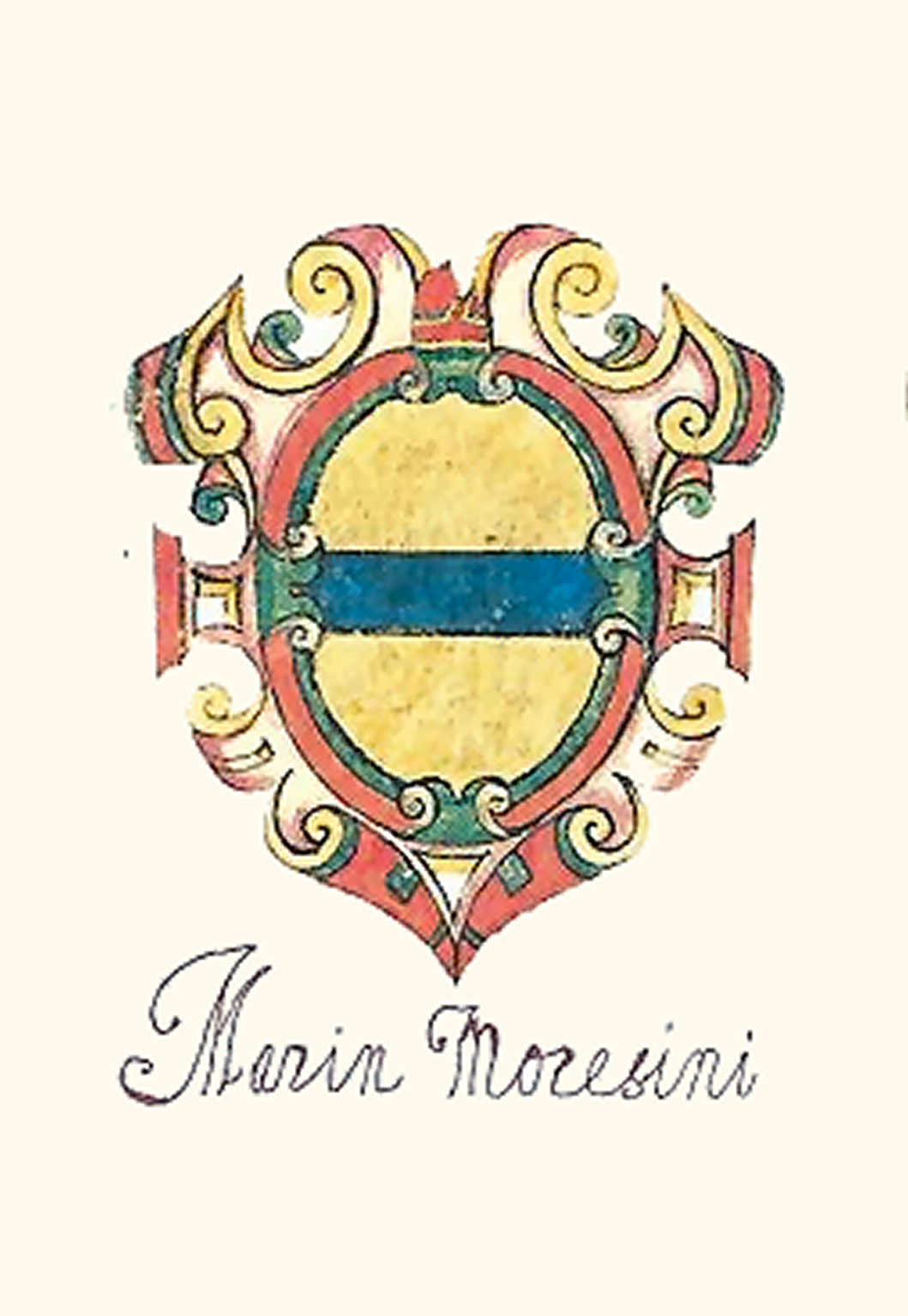
Coat of arms of Marino Morosini

Marino Morosini (1181 – 1 January 1253) was the Doge of Venice from 1249 to 1253.

== Family ==
Marino was the second of four members of the Morosini family to be elected doge. The other three were Domenico Morosini (1147–1156), Michele Morosini (1382) and Francesco Morosini (1688–1694). Four women in the family were also married to doges and had the title of dogaressa: Tommasina Morosini was the wife of Pietro Gradenigo, Francesca Morosini was married to Andrea Dandolo, Dea Morosini to Niccolò Tron and Morosina Morosini to Marino Grimani.

== Life ==
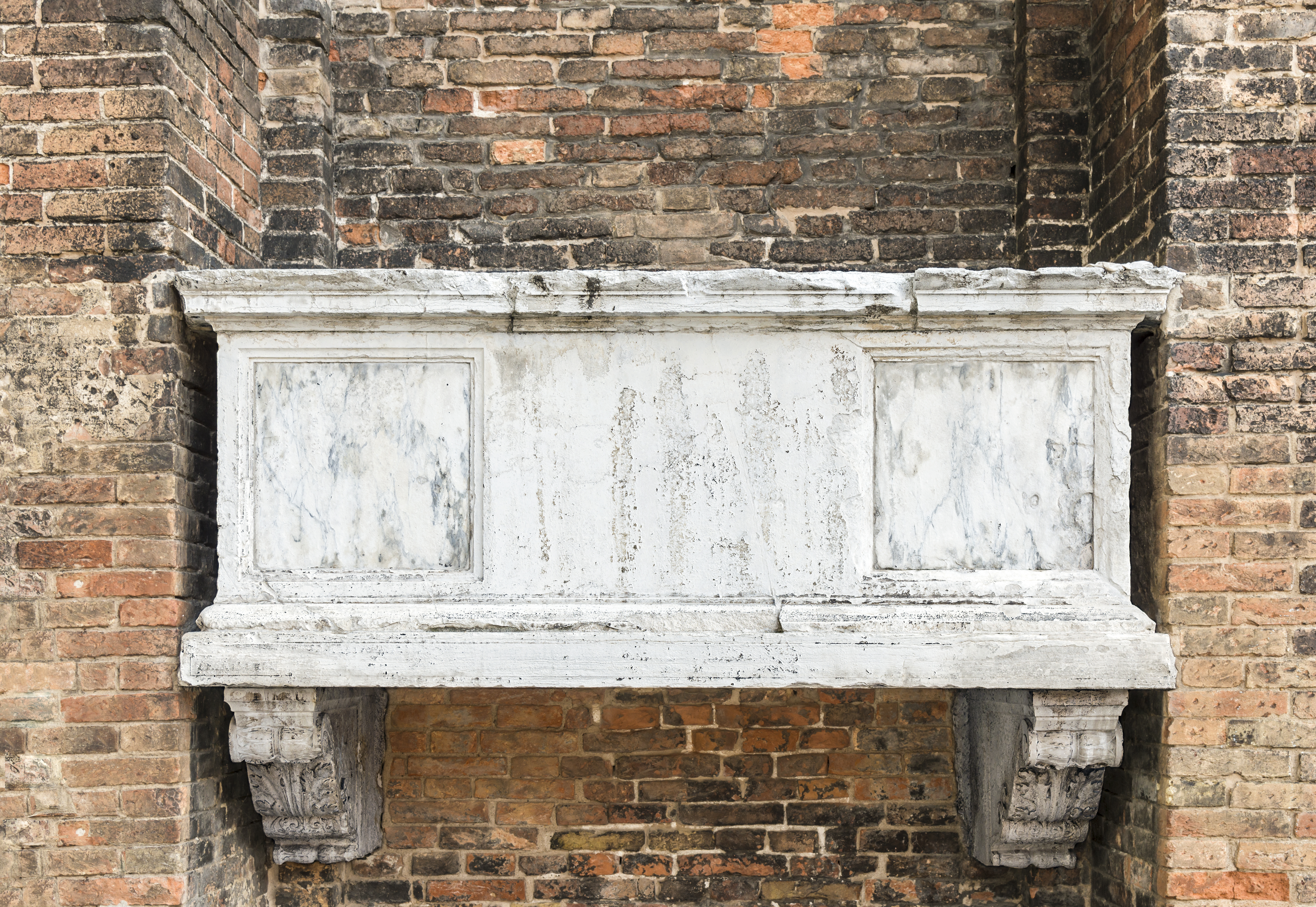
Marino Morosini's grave

Morosini was elected doge late in life, at the age of 68. At the time of his election, Morosini was the Procurator of Saint Mark's Basilica. During his political career, Morosini also held the position of Duke of Crete. He was married but did not have any children.

His four-year tenure as doge was a time of peace for Venice, although during this period, Louis IX of France led a crusade against Egypt. Not wanting to jeopardise its trade agreement with the sultan, Venice chose not to participate in the crusade.

Morosini sought to improve relations with the Vatican by making the concession to accept the establishment of a court of inquisition in Venice, but retained the right to appoint the judges. Nevertheless, tensions remained high between Rome and Venice.

Upon his death on 1 January 1253, Marino Morosini was interred in the atrium of Saint Mark's Basilica.

== Literature ==
- Claudio Rendina: I dogi. Storia e segreti. Rome 1984. ISBN 88-8289-656-0

Political offices
Preceded by Jacopo Tiepolo	Doge of Venice; 1249–1253	Succeeded by Reniero Zeno
