= Pasquale Cicogna =

Doge of Venice from 1585 to 1595

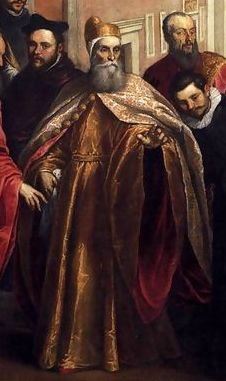
- Palma il Giovane, "Pasquale Cicogna in Dogal Robes Visiting the Church and Hospital of the Crociferi", oil on canvas, 1568–87.

Doge of Venice
- In office 1585–1595
- Preceded by: Nicolò da Ponte
- Succeeded by: Marino Grimani

Personal details
- Died: 1595

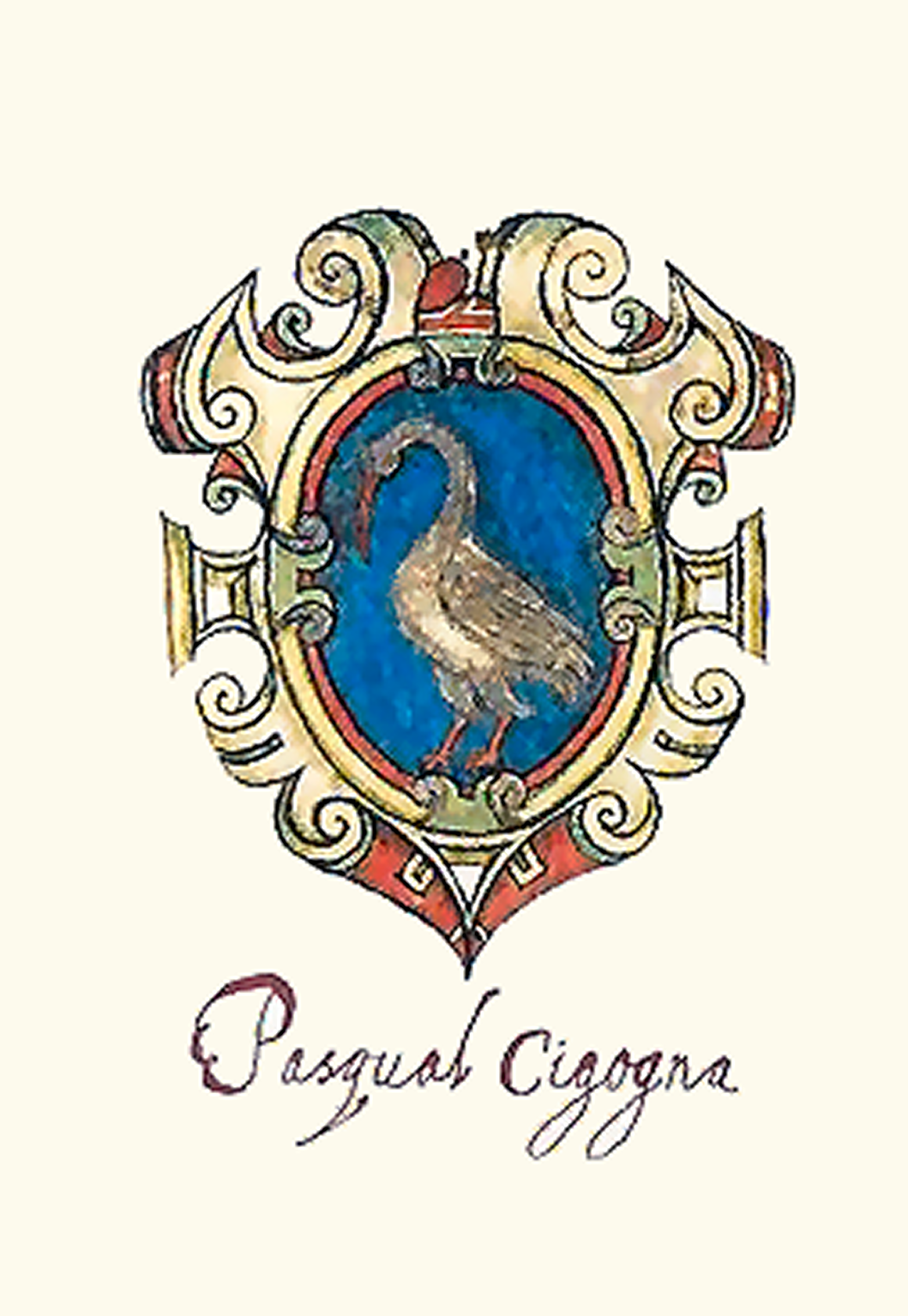
Coat of arms of Pasquale Cicogna

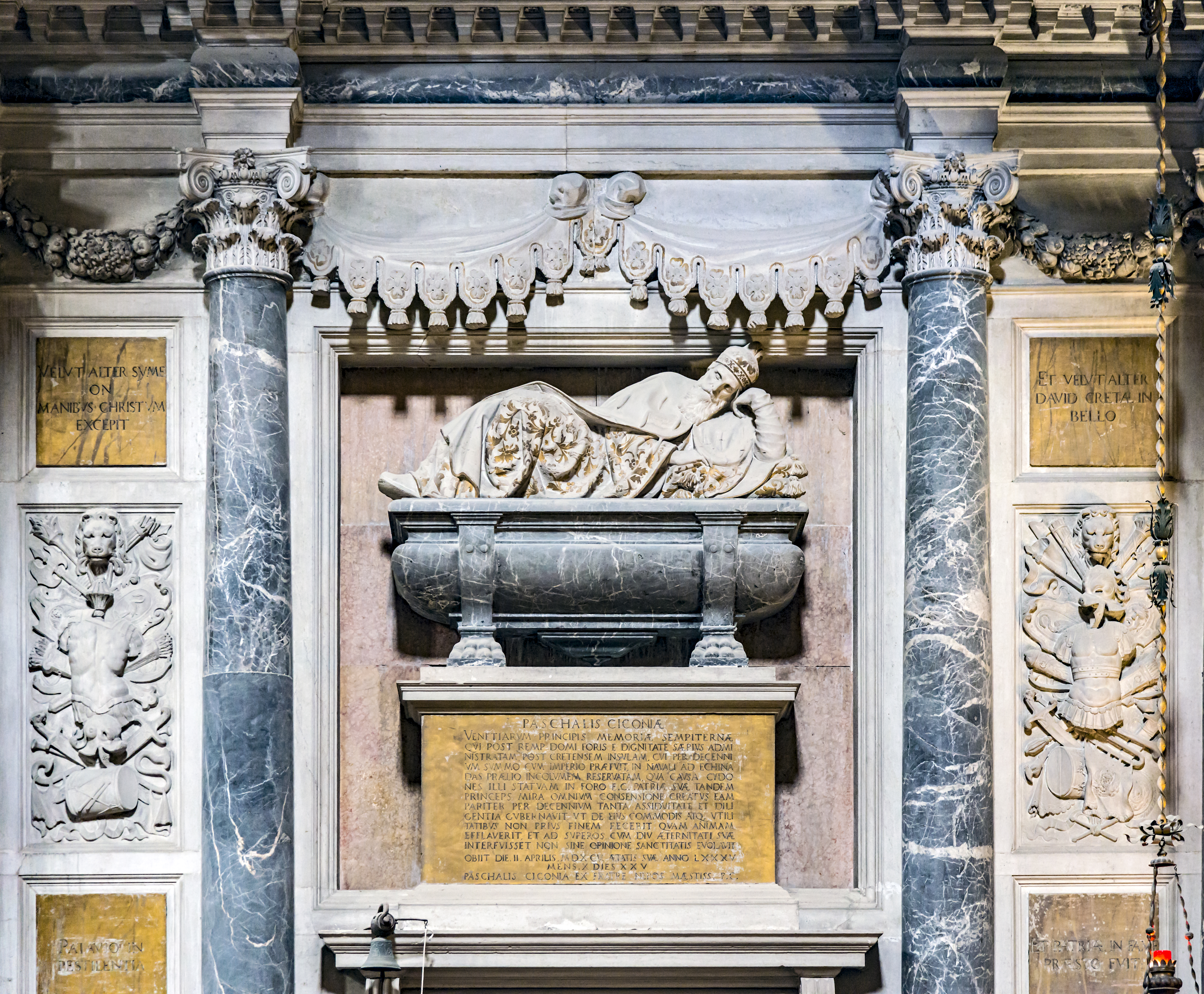
His grave.

Pasquale Cicogna (died 1595) was the 88th Doge of Venice from 1585 to 1595. He supported the claim of Henry of Navarre to the French throne, and convinced Pope Sixtus V to support Henry in exchange for his conversion to Catholicism.

He broke with tradition by scattering silver coins, rather than gold ducats, to the crowd during his coronation procession. These coins were known from then on as cicognini. As his reign of Doge continued his popularity increased because he was very diplomatic and able to tackle major problems with great success.

Arguably, one of his greatest successes was converting the Rialto Bridge, one of Venice's major landmarks and the only bridge over the Grand Canal of Venice, from wood to stone between 1588 and 1591. Although greater names such as Michelangelo had submitted designs, Pasquale chose the more humble architect Antonio da Ponte and his nephew Antonio Contin to design and rebuild the Rialto Bridge. After Pasquale Cicogna died of a fever in 1595 a memorial was inscribed on the bridge to the Doge. His dogaressa was Laura Morozini.

Political offices
Preceded by Nicolò da Ponte	Doge of Venice; 1585–1595	Succeeded by Marino Grimani
