= Giovanni II Cornaro =

Doge of Venice from 1709 to 1722

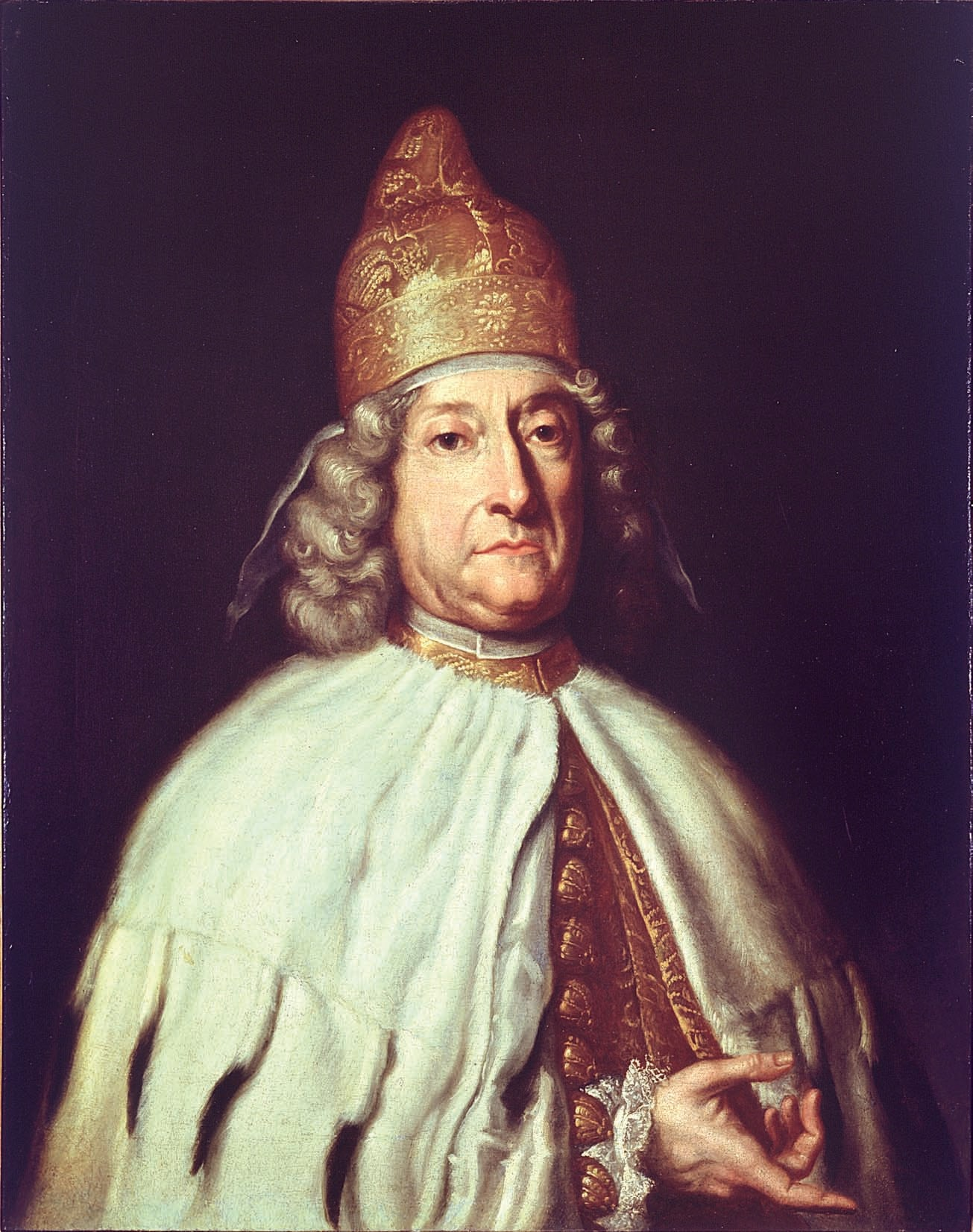
- Portrait by Vilma Lwoff-Parlaghy

Doge of Venice
- In office 1709–1722
- Preceded by: Alvise II Mocenigo
- Succeeded by: Sebastiano Mocenigo

Personal details
- Born: 4 August 1647 Venice
- Died: 12 August 1722 (aged 75) Venice
- Spouse: Laura Cornaro

Giovanni II Cornaro, sometimes Corner (4 August 1647 – 12 August 1722), was a Venetian nobleman and statesman who served as the 111th Doge of Venice from 22 May 1709 until his death.

Cornaro was born and died in Venice. He was a career statesman from a noble family. During his time as Doge, he led Venice in the last war against the Ottoman Empire, culminating in the signing of the Treaty of Passarowitz in 1718, whereby Venice lost the Morea and her last possessions in the Aegean Sea. He was succeeded as Doge by Sebastiano Mocenigo.

His dogaressa was Laura Cornaro.

Political offices
Preceded by Alvise II Mocenigo	Doge of Venice; 1709–1722	Succeeded by Alvise III Mocenigo
