= Lamentation over the Dead Christ (Bellini, Florence) =

Painting by Giovanni Bellini

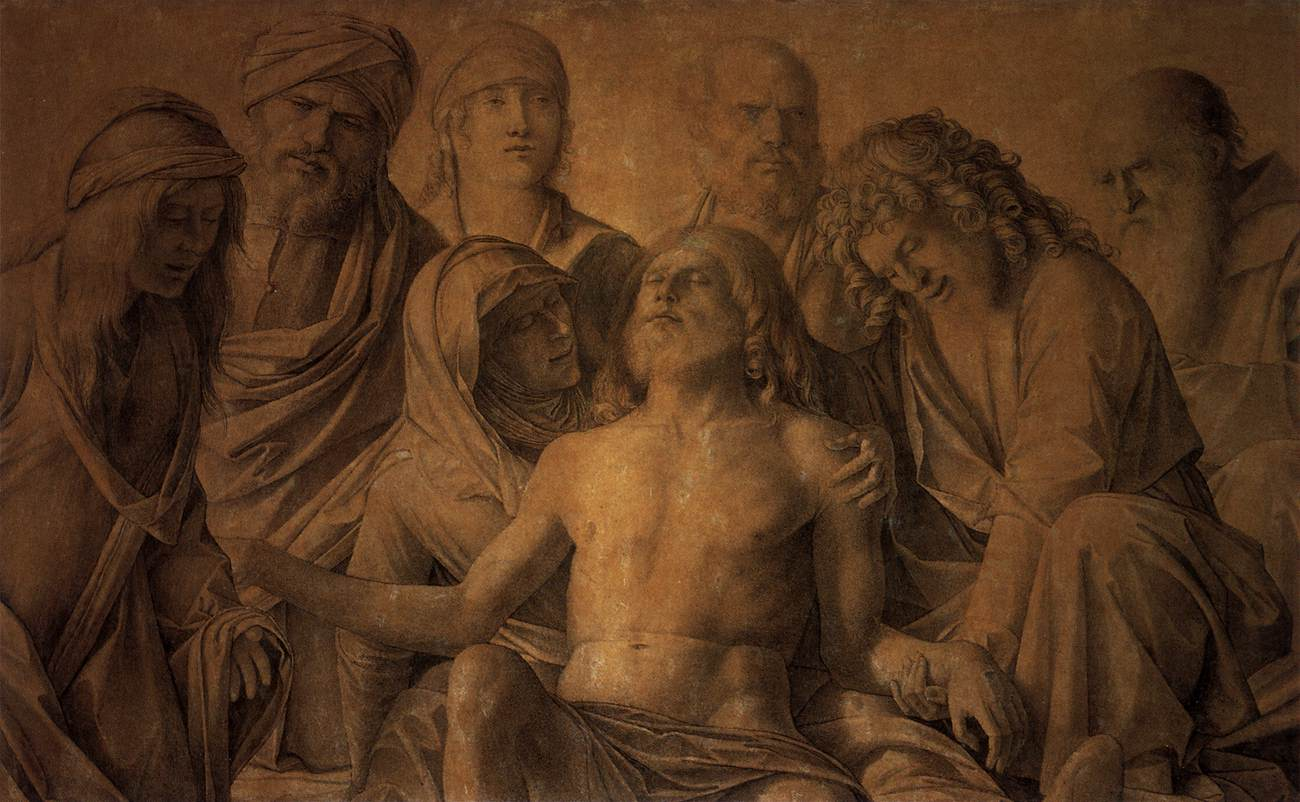
- Artist: Giovanni Bellini
- Year: ca. 1485–1495
- Medium: oil on panel
- Dimensions: 73 cm × 119 cm (29 in × 47 in)
- Location: Galleria degli Uffizi, Florence

Lamentation over the Dead Christ is a c. 1500 oil on panel painting by the Italian Renaissance master Giovanni Bellini kept at the Uffizi Gallery in Florence.

== History ==
The incomplete painting may have been intended as a reference image for Bellini's workshop or an underdrawing for a full painting. It was given to Ferdinand III, Grand Duke of Tuscany by doge Alvise Giovanni Mocenigo in return for a pietra dura snuffbox, decorated with gold and gems. Later, the Grand Duke gave the painting to the Uffizi Gallery on 22 October 1798, where it is still on display.

Critics have generally agreed that the painting was executed around the peak of Bellini's career, around the turn of the 16th century.

== Description and style ==
The Lamentation is painted in chiaroscuro. The painting exhibits a graphic visual style upon wooden support. Although it looks like a monochromatic sketch, the painting displays a high degree of intention. The ground is not prepared but actually forms a layer of the painting.

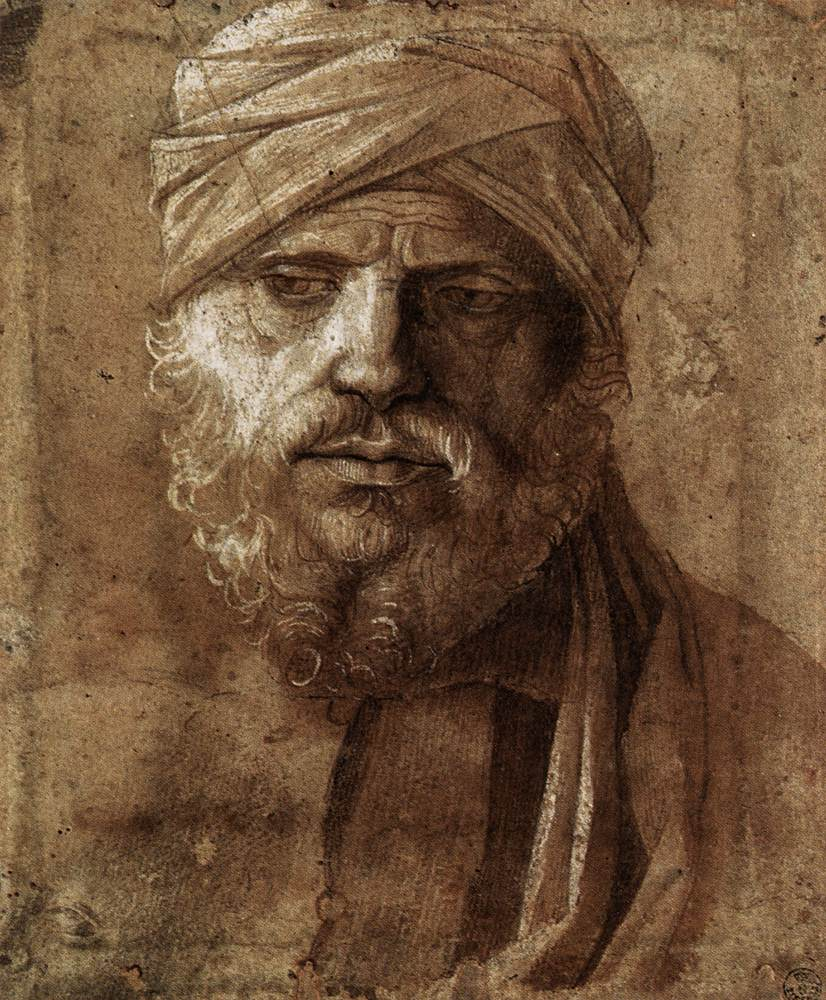
Study for the figure of Joseph of Arimathea

Compared to other Pietà compositions by Bellini, the Lamentation is more crowded. The dead Christ is at the center of the painting in a seated position. He is supported on the side by an expressive Madonna and Saint John the Baptist. On the left, Mary Magdalene and Joseph of Arimathea are both recognizable. Above, three figures are painted more faintly: a girl, a bald, bearded man, and Nicodemus, the elderly monk with the long beard. There is a study for the figure of Joseph of Arimathea in the Uffizi's drawing collection, the Gabinetto dei disegni e delle stampe.

The protruding knees of Christ, foreshortened, break the illusion of the painting's separation from its viewer.

== See also ==
- List of works by Giovanni Bellini

== Bibliography ==
- Olivari, Mariolina. Giovanni Bellini. Florence: Scala. ISBN 888117099X.
