= Marco Cornaro =

Doge of Venice from 1365 to 1368

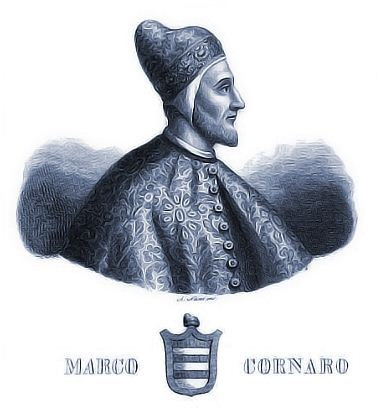

Doge of Venice
- In office 21 July 1365 – 13 January 1368
- Preceded by: Lorenzo Celsi
- Succeeded by: Andrea Contarini

Personal details
- Born: c. 1286
- Died: 13 January 1368

Marco Cornaro (c. 1286 – 13 January 1368), also known as Marco Corner, was the 59th doge of Venice, ruling from 21 July 1365 until his death on 13 January 1368. His brief reign saw the loss of Venetian territory to Genoa and the Ottoman Empire, though Venice was to enjoy economic growth during this time.

== Biography ==
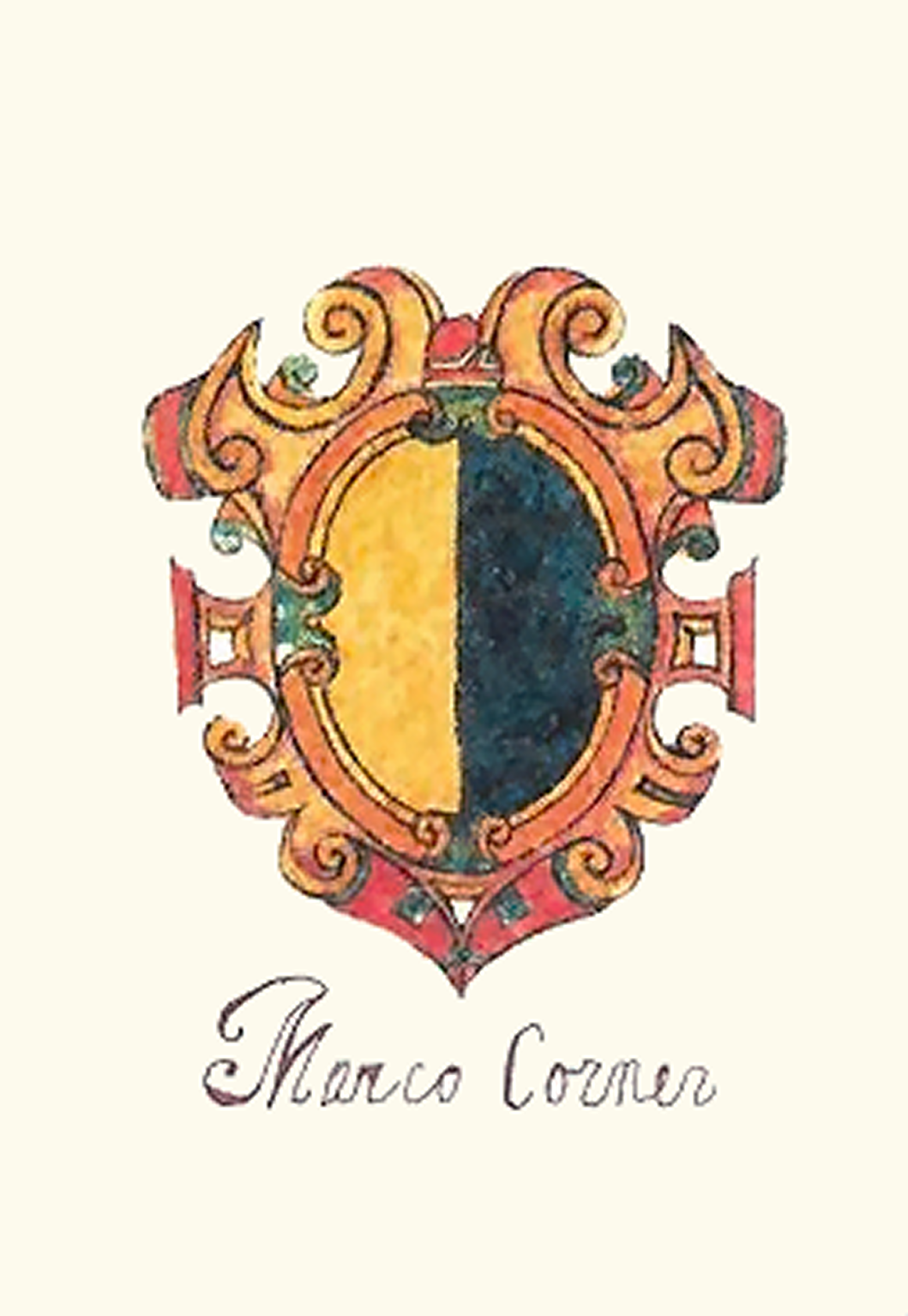
Coat of arms of Marco Cornaro

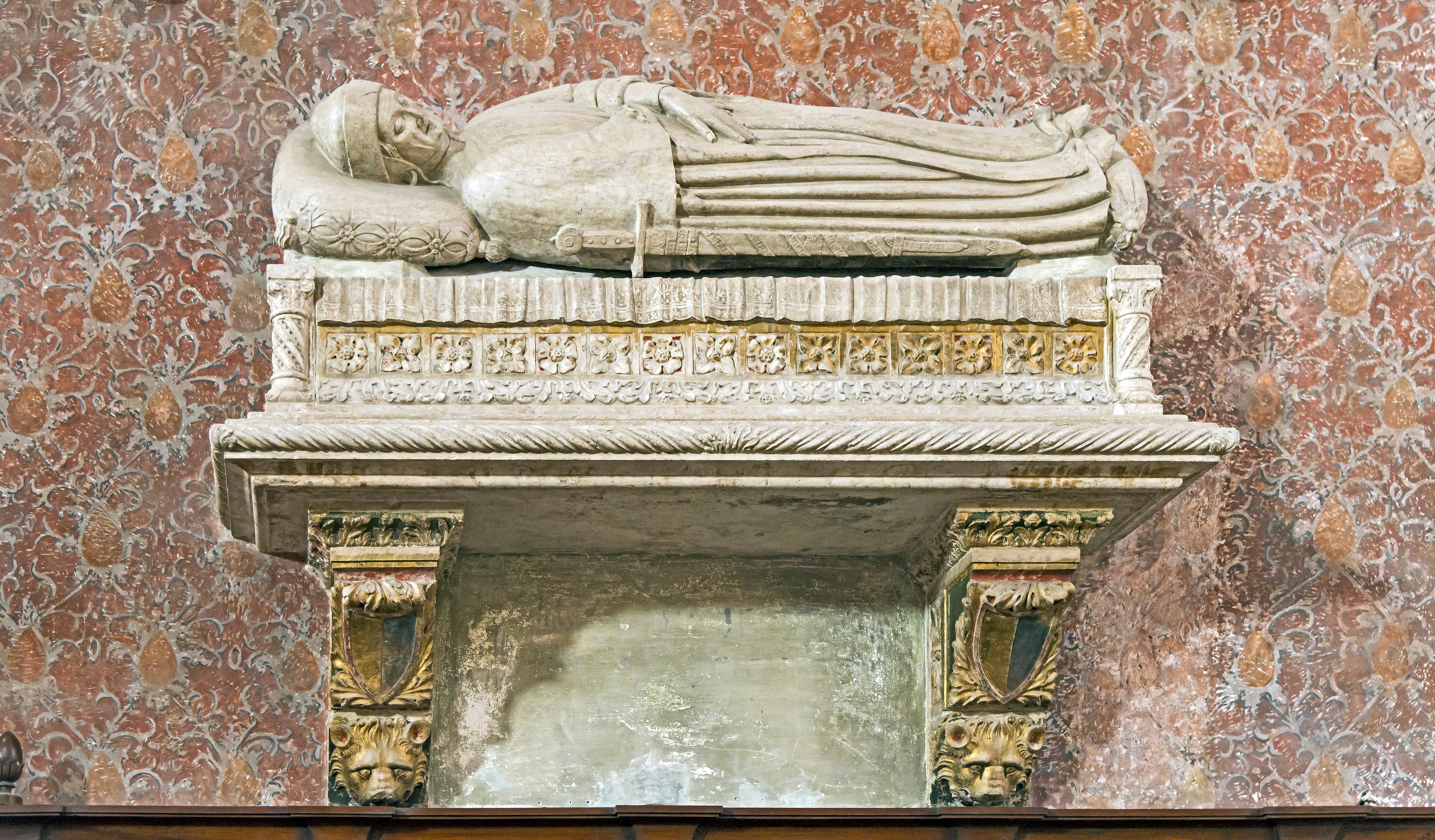
His tomb in Basilica of San Zanipolo

The Cornaro family to which the future doge was born was one of Venice's oldest, its lineage traceable to the Romans. It was also one of the richest, having achieved this status from money-lending. The Cornaros would produce three more doges in the 17th and 18th centuries.

Marco Cornaro's first marriage was to Giovanna Scrovegni of Padua, with whom he had three sons and two daughters. His second marriage was to a woman named Caterina about whom little is known other than her low social status made his later election to the doge difficult. Dogaressa Caterina was somewhat mocked for her simple habits, which was not seen as suitable for the rank of a dogaressa, but he always defended her and called her a good woman and wife. Cornaro acquired his own wealth through trade with Egypt. He also followed both military and political careers in the service of the Republic, leading troops at sea and on the mainland. He served as ambassador to Emperor Charles IV and Pope Clement VI, and was also a member of the Venetian delegation to the election of Pope Urban V in Avignon.

Cornaro was instrumental in the discovery and suppression of the attempted coup d'état in 1355 by the then doge Marino Faliero, who intended to declare himself prince of Venice. Following the dissolution of the plot and execution of the conspirators, Cornaro was briefly made vice-doge before a successor to Faliero could be appointed.

== Dogal office ==
On the death of the previous incumbent Lorenzo Celsi on 18 July 1365, Cornaro was elected three days later to the dogal office, despite the aspersions cast by his opponents over his advanced age, his wife's low birth and his friendships with foreign princes. Once elected, in contrast to his predecessors, he established a respectful stance towards Venice's public bodies.

During the two and a half years of his reign, Venice saw no major changes or wars, although it lost the islands of Chios and Lesbos and the city of Phocaea to the Republic of Genoa. He was successful in re-establishing Venetian trade with Egypt by convincing Urban V to rescind his prohibition on dealing with infidels. Cornaro ordered the construction of a wing of the Doge's Palace on its side facing San Marco.

Marco Cornaro died in the early hours of 13 January 1368. He is buried in the Basilica of San Zanipolo.

Political offices
Preceded by Lorenzo Celsi	Doge of Venice; 1365–1368	Succeeded by Andrea Contarini
