= Nicolò da Ponte =

Doge of Venice from 1578 to 1585

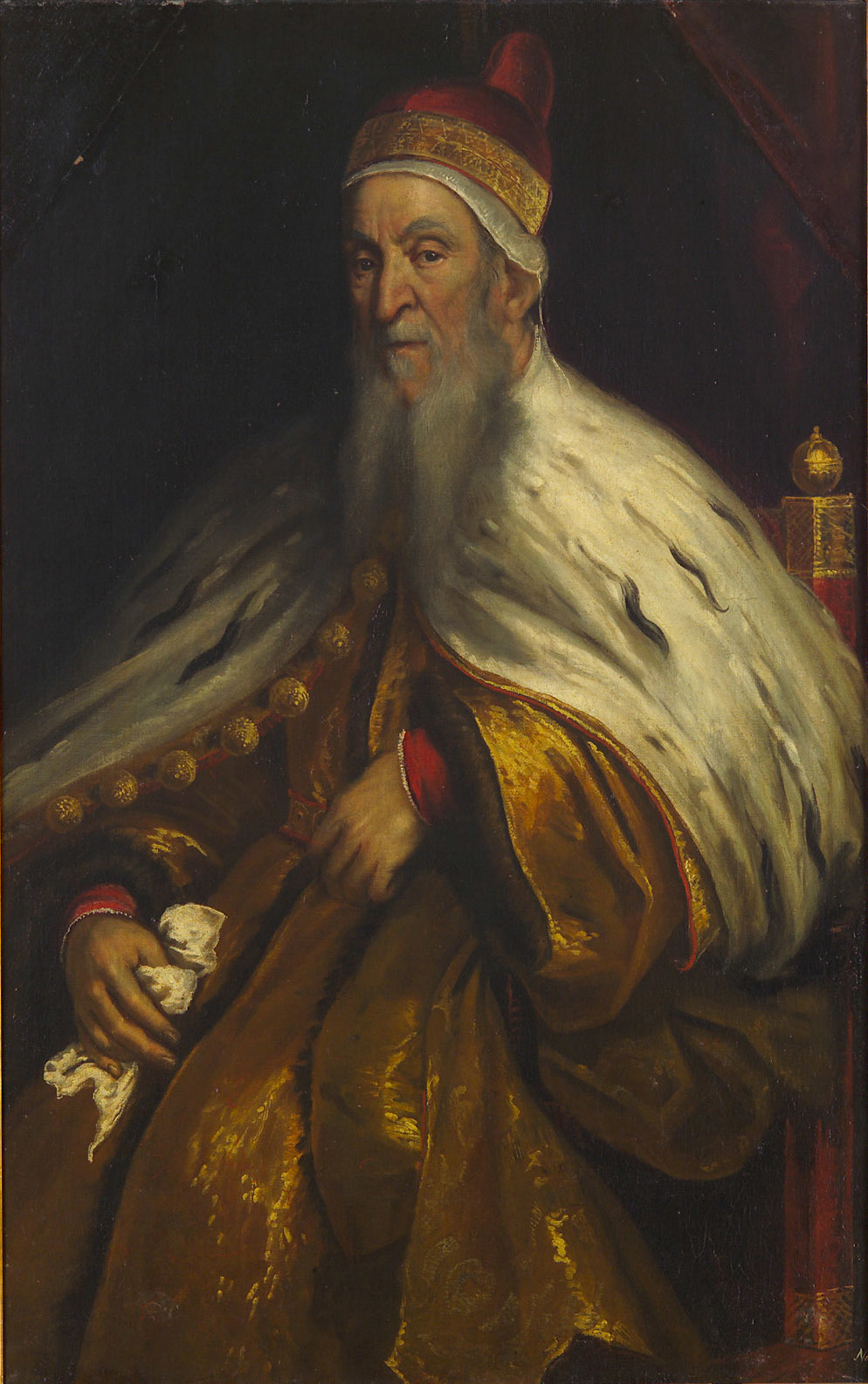
- Portrait of Nicolò da Ponte by Palma Giovane.

Doge of Venice
- In office 1578–1585
- Preceded by: Sebastiano Venier
- Succeeded by: Pasquale Cicogna

Personal details
- Born: 15 January 1491; Venice, Republic of Venice
- Died: 30 July 1585 (aged 94); Venice, Republic of Venice

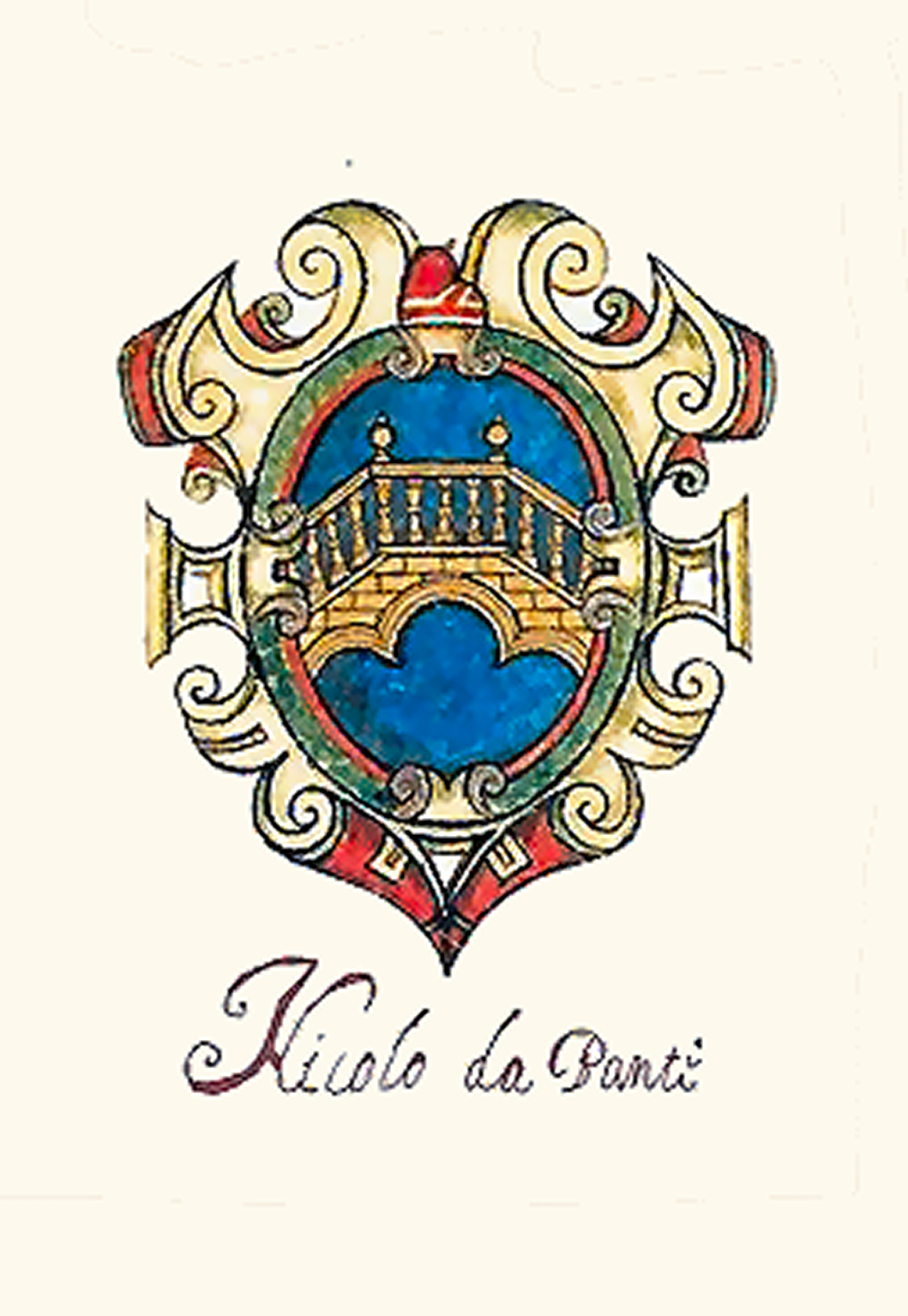
Nicolò da Ponte's coat of arms.

Nicolò da Ponte (15 January 1491 – 30 July 1585) was the 87th Doge of Venice from 1578 to 1585. He reigned in a fairly quiet period.

== Life ==
Da Ponte was born in Sant’Agnese in Venice to the patrician Antonio da Ponte and his wife Regina Spandolino, who was originally from Constantinople. The da Pontes had just gone through a period of severe financial difficulties after the Ottoman conquest of Negroponte, where it owned considerable property, but the marriage of his father with a Greek suggests that he still maintained business interests in the East.

Despite these difficulties da Ponte received an excellent education, training with the famous Ignazio Danti and studying philosophy at the University of Padua. But he did not finish his studies, perhaps because of the outbreak of the War of the League of Cambrai. He received a doctorate in medicine in Venice (1514).

Like all young Venetian aristocrats, he began a promising cursus honorum (having significant physical and intellectual gifts) that saw him elected to the Collegio dei Savi, but he suddenly cut this career short. It seems that in the twenty years between 1512 and 1530 he was engaged in trade and was so successful that he was able to build a sumptuous palace in San Maurizio and amass a fortune estimated at 150,000 ducats. At the same time he successfully cultivated cultural interests. In 1521 he replaced Sebastian Foscarini for two years as a lecturer in philosophy at the School of Rialto.

In 1520 he married Arcangela Alvise Canal, with whom he had two children, Antonio and Pauline. His son predeceased him in 1558, and when Nicolò died he left his property to his nephew, also named Nicolò. The latter died in 1590 without heirs, leaving this branch of the Da Ponte extinct.

== Reign as Doge ==
In 1570 da Ponte became a Procurator of San Marco, and on 11 March 1578, he was elected as Doge in a long and conflict-ridden election that required 44 ballots after Sebastiano Venier's death on 3 March.

Although he was in his late 80s when elected Doge, he had a very active reign that lasted more than seven years. Young politicians looked to him during the internal crisis of 1581-82 that led to the reform of the Council of Ten. On several occasions he distinguished himself for his anti-clericalism. He died in July 1585 at age 94.

Political offices
Preceded by Sebastiano Venier	Doge of Venice; 1578–1585	Succeeded by Pasquale Cicogna
