= Lorenzo Celsi =

Doge of Venice from 1361 to 1365

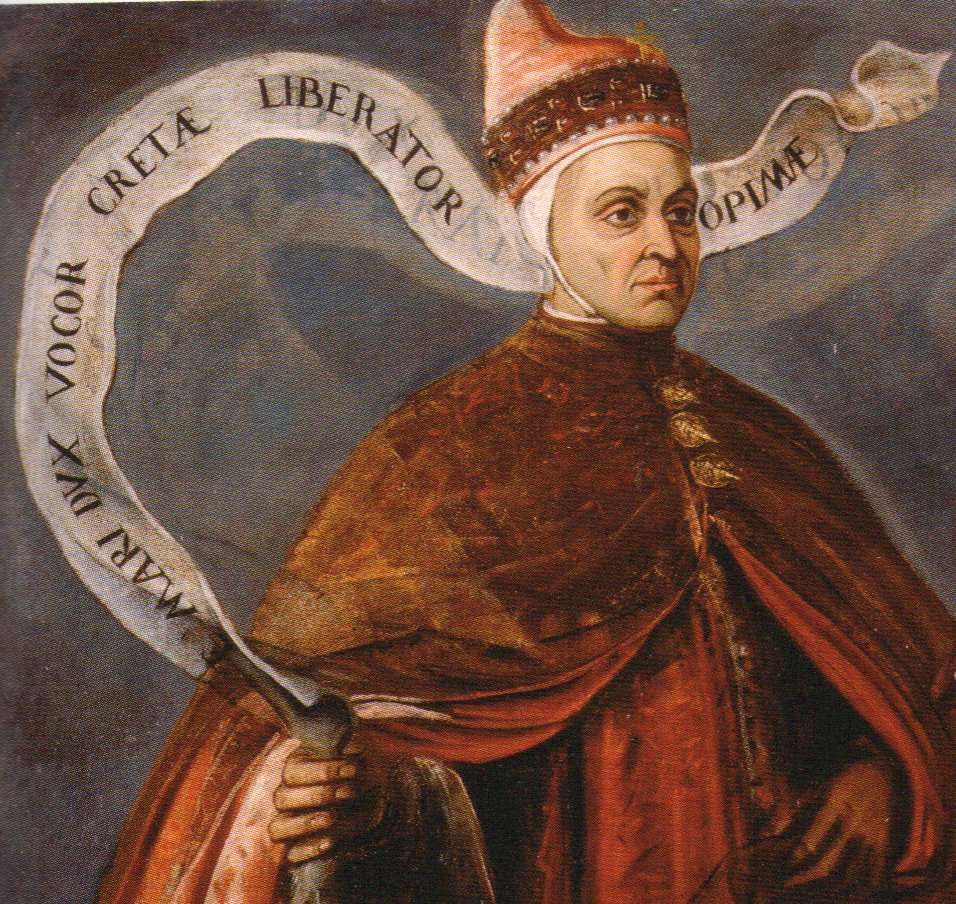

Doge of Venice
- In office 1361–1365
- Preceded by: Giovanni Dolfin
- Succeeded by: Marco Cornaro

Personal details
- Born: c. 1310
- Died: 18 July 1365

Lorenzo Celsi (c. 1310 – 18 July 1365) was a Venetian statesman who served as the 58th Doge of Venice, from 16 July 1361 until his death on 18 July 1365.

== Biography ==
He was the son of a rich Celsi family, and was previously noted for leading a flotilla against Genoa to help preserve Venetian interests. He was married to Marchesina Ghisi. During his reign, Celsi confronted the revolt of St. Tito in Crete, a rebellion that overthrew the official Venetian authorities and attempted to create an independent state. Celsi was succeeded as Doge by Marco Cornaro.

Political offices
| Preceded by Giovanni Dolfin | Doge of Venice; 1361–1365 | Succeeded by Marco Cornaro |
