= Loicia da Prata =

Dogaressa of Venice

Loicia (Aloicia) da Prata or Alucia da Frata (d. after 1268) was the Dogaressa of Venice by marriage to the Doge Reniero Zeno (r. 1252–1268).

She was from an influential family of Friuli, which was initially a matter of dislike when she became dogaressa.

Her spouse was elected doge in 1252. Loicia da Prata was described as beautiful, virtuous and generous. She was reportedly a popular dogaressa, known for her charitable projects. Upon the will of the government doge Reniero Zeno introduced the "Promissione" to curb any potential influence of the dogaressa upon the affairs of state. In accordance with its terms, dogaressa Loicia da Prata was made to swear not to receive food stuffs, cattle and horses, poultry and game or other gifts, except upon due payment, nor to make donations herself to any official dependant or anyone of whom she had bestowed her patronage; she was also prohibited from promising offices to supplicants or to write recommendations for supplicants to the Doge or to the council, prohibitions which was also to apply to sons, daughters, daughters-in-law or any other relative to the doge residing in the Doge Palace.

However, Loicia da Prata neutralized this law by her extensive charity as a private person, which she officially conducted not in her position of dogaressa, and which gave her much positive publicity. She founded the Hospital of Sta. Maria on the site originally occupied by that of Doge Pietro Orseolo II., with an Oratory, Oratorio del Crocifisso.

She survived Reniero Zeno's death in 1268: her date of death is not recorded, by it was noted that she survived him by "many years". She did not follow the common custom for widowed dogaressas and enter a convent: her spouse left her the bulk of his fortune, and she settled in the palace Casa Zeno, spending her time on administrating her property and her private donations to charitable institutions. She left her substantial personal effects in donation to her hospital in her will.

Preceded by Valdrada of Sicily	Dogaressa of Venice	Succeeded by Marchesina Ghisi
