= Marino Grimani (doge) =

Doge of Venice from 1595 to 1605

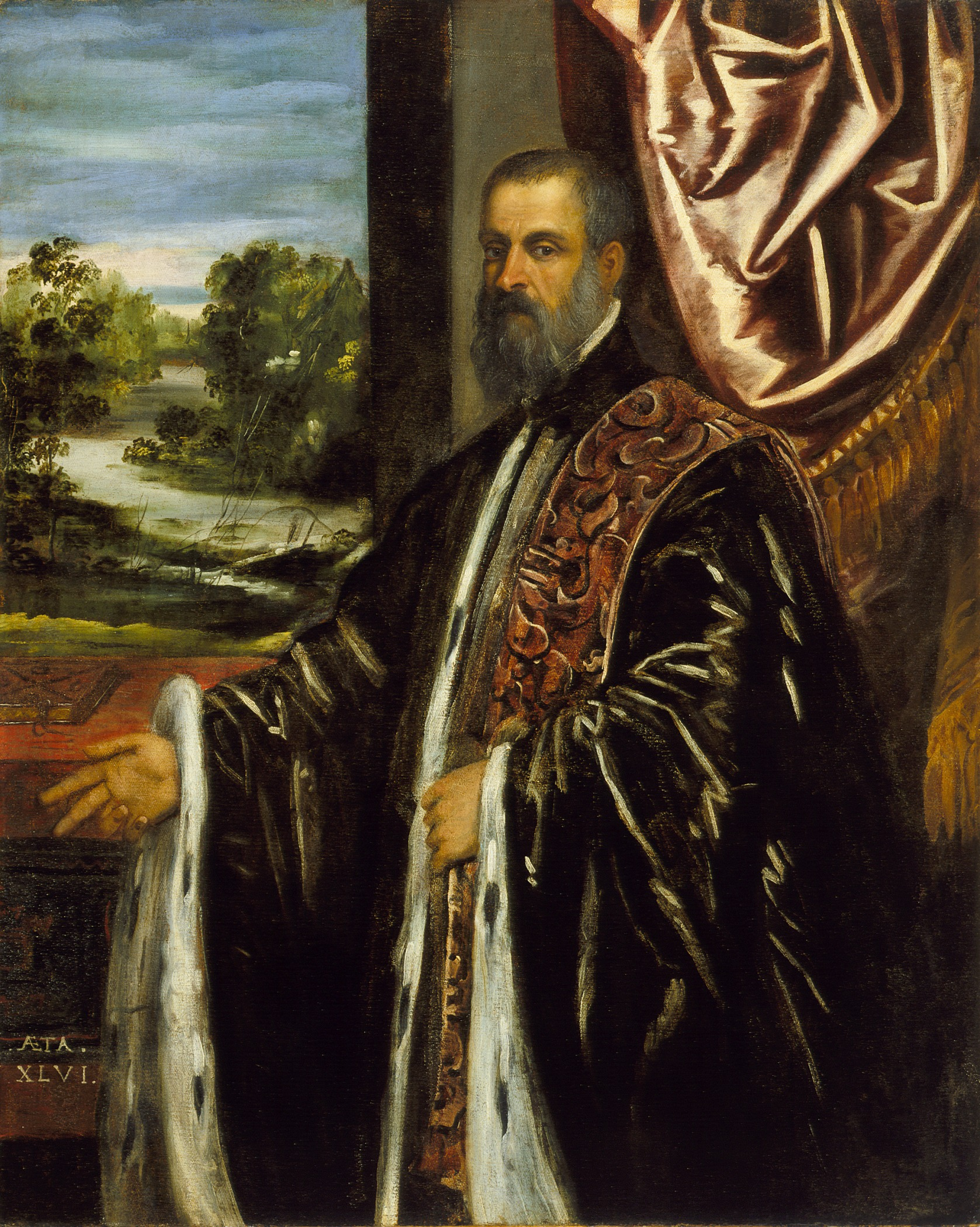
Portrait by Jacopo Tintoretto, 1578

Marino Grimani (1 July 1532 in Venice – 25 December 1605 in Venice) was the 89th Doge of Venice, reigning from 26 April 1595 until his death. Grimani's reign as doge was principally remembered for two reasons:

1. the splendid celebrations for the coronation of his wife, Morosina Morosini; and
2. the beginning of the quarrel with the papacy that resulted in Pope Paul V placing the Republic of Venice under papal interdict in the reign of Grimani's successor, Leonardo Donato (1606–1607).

== Early political career, 1532–1595 ==
Grimani was born in 1532 to Donata Pisani and Girolamo Grimani. Grimani's father was a wealthy man and an able politician. Given his wealthy background, Marino Grimani became podestà at a relatively young age, and was then appointed as Venice's Ambassador to the Vatican in Rome. Upon his return to Venice, he was made a cavaliere. He became active in city politics and used his immense wealth to gain the acclaim of the people.

== Doge, 1595–1605 ==
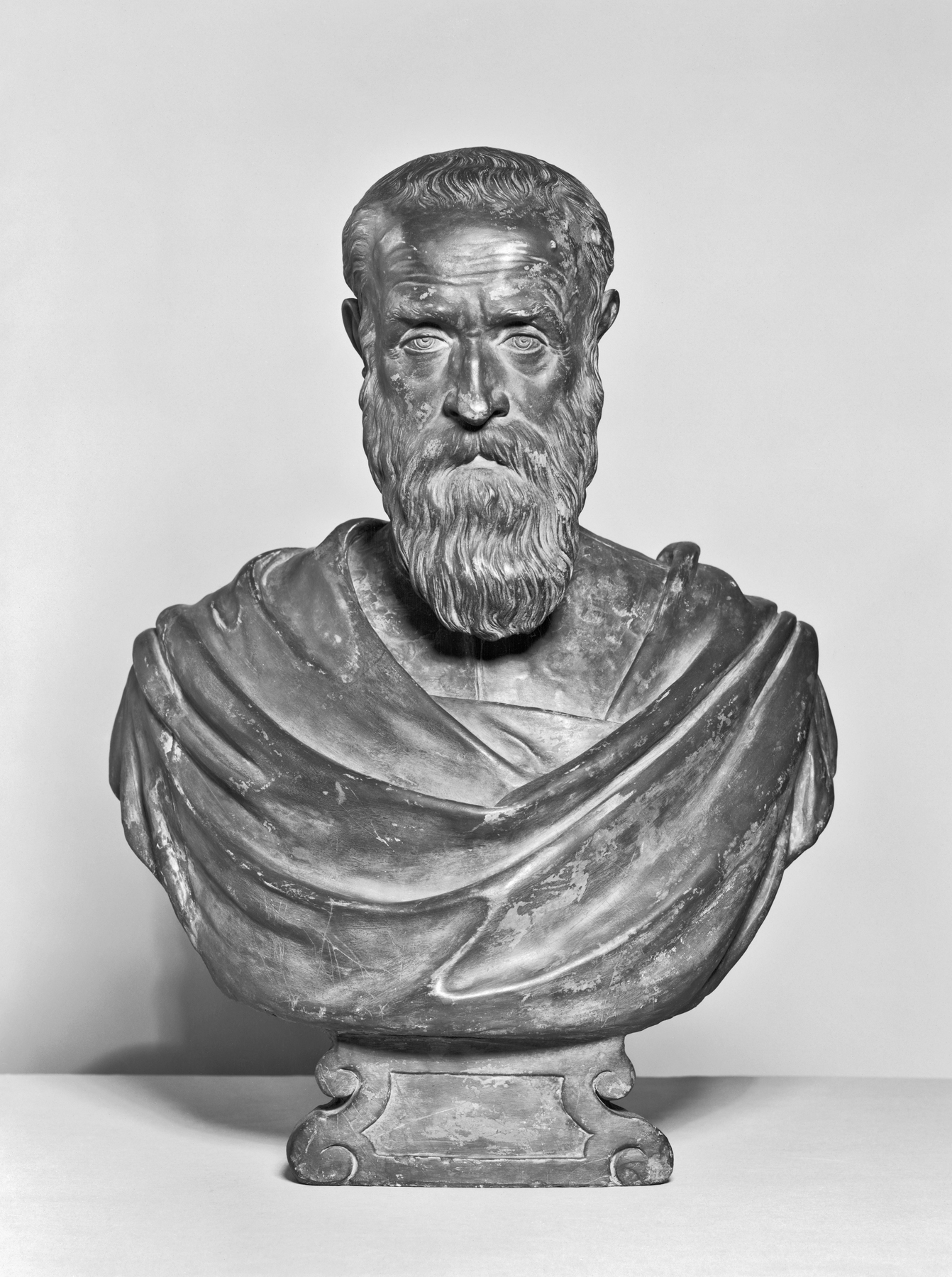
Terracotta bust by Alessandro Vittoria

Following the death of Pasquale Cicogna, Grimani was a candidate for Doge. After 70 ballots, none of the candidates had the votes necessary to be elected. At this point, Grimani made liberal use of "gifts" in order to break the deadlock, and he was eventually elected Doge on 26 April 1595.

Given Grimani's popularity with the people, his election set off a long round of festivities and celebrations, and, just as these were waning, the coronation of Morosina Morosini as dogaressa set off a new round of opulent festivities.

Between 1601 and 1604, Venice, under Grimani's leadership, passed a number of laws limiting the power of the papacy within the Republic of Venice and withdrew a number of clerical privileges. This came to a head in late 1605 when Venice charged two priests as common criminals, thus denying their clerical immunity from facing charges in secular courts. On 10 December 1605, Pope Paul V sent a formal protest to Venice.

Grimani died on 25 December 1605, leaving the dispute with the papacy unresolved.

Political offices
| Preceded by Pasquale Cicogna | Doge of Venice; 1595–1605 | Succeeded by Leonardo Donato |
