= Caterina Corner (dogaressa) =

Dogaressa of Venice

Caterina Corner (fl. 1367) was the Dogaressa of Venice by marriage to the Doge Marco Corner (r. 1365-1367).

Caterina became the second spouse of Marco Corner. Very little is known of her, but the fact that her low social status at birth made the election of her spouse as doge difficult. Dogaressa Caterina was somewhat mocked for her simple habits, which was not seen as unsuitable for the rank of a dogaressa, but the doge always loyally defended her and called her a good woman and wife.
