= Giovanni Gradenigo =

Doge of Venice from 1355 to 1356

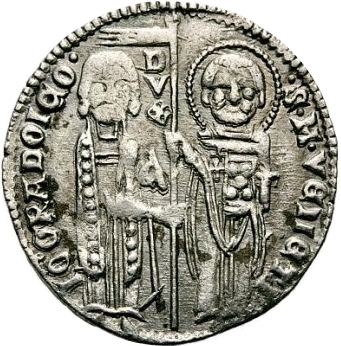
- A grosso of Giovanni Gradenigo

Doge of Venice
- In office 1355–1356
- Preceded by: Marino Faliero
- Succeeded by: Giovanni Dolfin

Personal details
- Born: c. 1280
- Died: 8 August 1356

Giovanni Gradenigo (c. 1280 – 8 August 1356) was the 56th Doge of Venice from 1355 until his death on 8 August 1356. During his reign, Venice signed a peace treaty with Genoa.

== Biography ==
Gradenigo was born in Venice. He was married to Adriana Borromeo and then to Marina Capello. Before his election, he had been podestà in Capodistria, Padua, and Treviso. His recognized loyalty to the Venetian Republic probably helped him in being elected, as he came after the conjure which had led to the execution of his predecessor, Marino Faliero.

Two months after his election, the Venetians signed a peace treaty with Genoa, ending a long and unfavorable war. During his reign, measures were taken to improve the Republic's economic situation, but in 1356, they were again in war both on the mainland and in Dalmatia (which would end in the unfavorable Treaty of Zadar under his successor, Giovanni Dolfin).

He died in August 1356.

Political offices
Preceded by Marino Faliero	Doge of Venice; 1355–1356	Succeeded by Giovanni Dolfin
