= Giovanna Dandolo =

Dogaressa of Venice

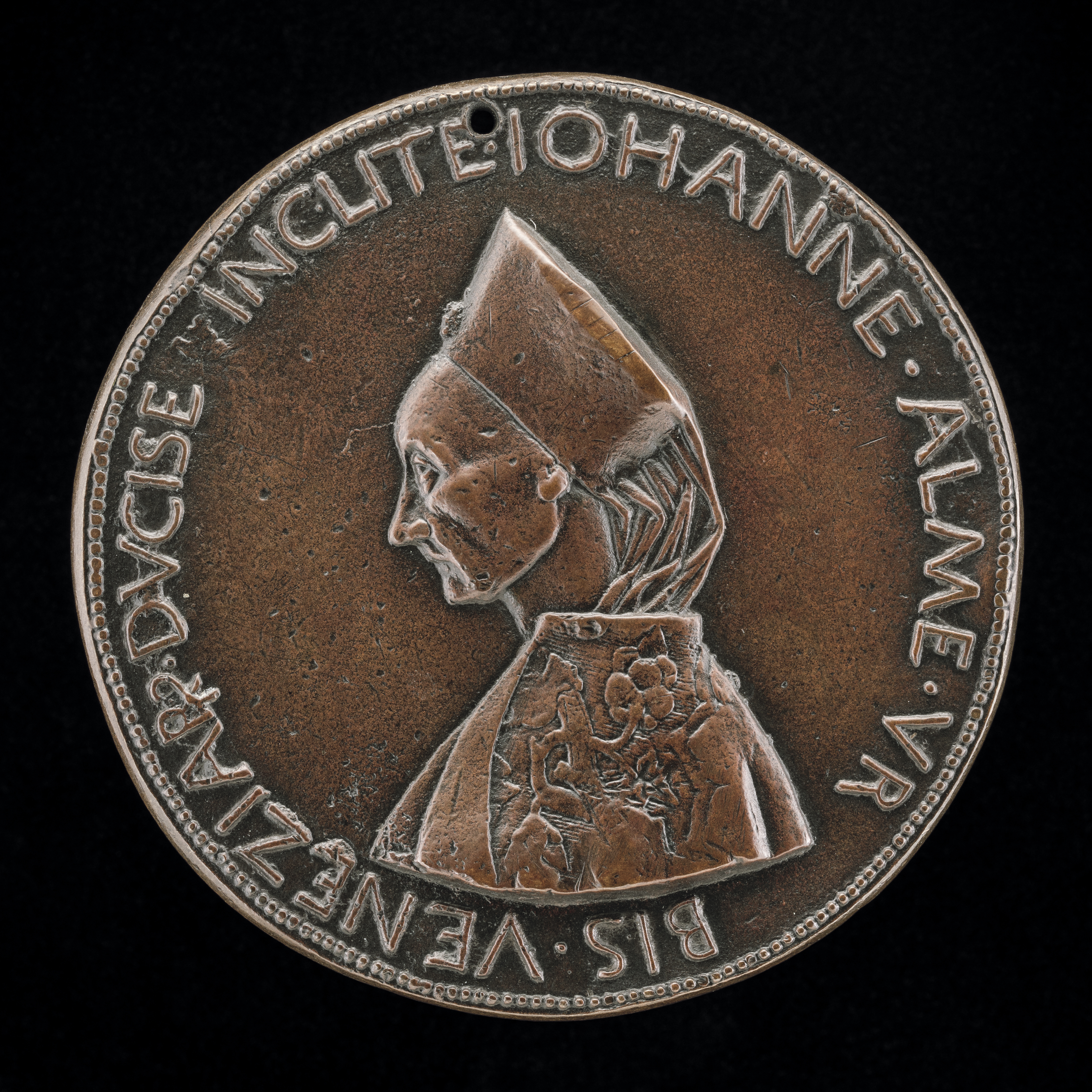
Pietro da Fano, Giovanna Dandolo, Wife of Pasquale Malipiero (reverse), c. 1452-1464, NGA 44557

Giovanna Dandolo was a dogaressa of Venice by marriage to doge Pasquale Malipiero (reign 1457–1462).

She was born circa 1400 as the daughter of Antonio Dandolo and married to Pasquale Malipiero in 1414. She had four children: Lorenzo, Antonio, Maddalena and Polo.

Her spouse was elected doge in 1457. She was given an elaborate coronation and entry in to Venice as dogaressa in January 1458. As her predecessor before her, Giovanna Dandolo came to play a very public role as dogaressa, performing representational tasks and acting as the protector of trades and individual artists. She supported the newly introduced art of book printing in Venice, the lace industry of Burano, and acted as a financier for many writers, artists and scientists. She was referred to as the 'Empress of Printing' and the 'Queen of Lace' due to her role as the benefactor of these trades.

She gathered a circle of 'men of letters' and writers around her and acted as their patron. Palazzi in La Virtu in Giuocco records that she was "a princess of splendid physical and mental gifts but possessed of no private fortune.... In 1469 Giovanni Spira dedicated to her the first book ever printed in Venice". Many of the early books printed in Venice are dedicated to her, in gratitude for her patronage. Four of the first books printed in Venice in 1469 were all dedicated to her patronage. She also became a patron of the lace industry of Burano, which developed during this period. Reportedly, she gathered a circle of noblewomen and manufactured the lace herself as well.

The only known surviving portrait of a 15th-century dogaressa is that of Giovanna Dandolo on the reverse of a medal designed by Pietro da Fano (c. 1460). She was the only dogaressa depicted on a portrait medal prior to the 16th-century, as well as one of only three Italian women, with Isotta degli Atti and Gianfrancesco I Gonzaga's daughter Cecilia Gonzaga, to have portrait medals made of them prior to this period.

Preceded by Marina Nani	Dogaressa of Venice; 1457–1462	Cristina Sanudo
