= Alicia Michele =

Dogaressa of Venice

Alicia or Adelasa (d. after 1156) was the Dogaressa of Venice by marriage to the Doge Domenico Michiel (r. 1117–1130) and the mother of the Doge Vital II Michiel. She was politically active during the reign of her spouse, continued to be a part of the political life after his abdication in 1130, and successfully worked for Vital II Michele's election as doge.

Donna Alicia is described as a politically active dogaressa and is said to have been the partner of Doge Domenico in his projects and ambitions. As dogaressa, she encouraged guilds, crafts, and art, protected charity organisations, and received ambassadors. When her spouse abdicated and entered a monastery in 1130, she made a scandal by refusing to become a nun. She remained active in political life and is said to have acted as a political adviser to several power holders in the city. She used her connections to have Vital II Michele elected doge, a goal she succeeded with in 1156.

== Notes ==
Preceded by Dogaressa Matelda	Dogaressa of Venice; 1116–1130	Dogaressa Sofia
