= Marina Galina =

Dogaressa of Venice

Marina Galina (died 1420) was the Dogaressa of Venice by marriage to the Doge Michele Steno (r. 1400-1413).

She was a member of the ancient family of Galina and its status far exceeded that of the family of her future spouse. The year of her marriage is not confirmed but reported to have been 1362. She had no children. While the year of her birth is not known, she was reportedly quite elderly when she became dogaressa.

Her spouse was elected doge in 1400. She was crowned and had her solemn Entry into the City in to the city in 1401. She was the dogaressa during a golden age for Venice, and acted as the protector of literature, culture and crafts work. Marina Galina and Michele Steno were both old when they became dogaressa and doge, but both was described as youthful people who enjoyed the latest fashion and parties, and their tenure hosted a spectacular court life at the Doge Palace. She as well as her spouse were members of the famous cultural society Compagnia della Calza. The Compagnia was a club composed of aristocratic males and female associates interested in fashion, and its purpose was to organize State pageants, receptions of foreign princes and ambassadors, performances of games and plays, and the attendance at solemn Ecclesiastical functions.

She was widowed in 1413. She is known to have made at least five different wills during her lifetime.

== Bibliography ==
- Staley, Edgcumbe: The dogaressas of Venice : The wives of the doges, London : T. W. Laurie

Preceded by Agnese da Mosto	Dogaressa of Venice; 1400–1413	Marina Nani
