= Marina Nani =

Dogaressa of Venice

Marina Nani (circa 1400–1473) was a Dogaressa of Venice by marriage to the Doge Francesco Foscari (r. 1423–1457).

She was the daughter of Bartolommeo Nani and married Francesco Foscari in 1415. Her spouse was elected Doge in 1423. She would have been born in about 1400 and was one of the youngest dogaressas ever, as well as one of the few to give birth in office. She was crowned in an elaborate ceremony in 1427, when a crown was placed upon her head, and made a formal entry into the city. She was escorted during the ceremony by the marquis of Mantua and the marquis of Ferrara.

Marina Nani played an active role during her husband's office, and few of the preceding or succeeding dogaressas participated so much in official representation and had such a visible public role as she. She is noted to have acted as an envoy to visiting female dignitaries or wives of visiting male dignitaries, showing them around Venice and thereby demonstrating its wealth and position and working as a diplomat forging alliances.

In 1445 her son Jacopo was accused of high treason and bribery, and her spouse was forced to have him exiled. Marina pleaded for him without success. This caused Francesco a depression, which made Pietro Loredani accuse him of being unsuitable for his office. Marina pleaded with Loredani, but he answered by accusing her of high treason and adultery. Francesco was deposed in 1457 and died shortly after. The authorities wished to give him a state funeral because he was popular and the public was not aware of how he had been deposed. Marina refused to give them his body. Eventually, she was forced to do so, but she refused to participate in the funeral.

Maria Nani had a long widowhood and lived a peaceful life on substantial land she had inherited.

== Notes ==
Preceded by Marina Galina	Dogaressa of Venice; 1423–1457	Giovanna Dandolo
