= Morosina Morosini =

Dogaressa of Venice from 1595 to 1605

Morosina Morosini-Grimani
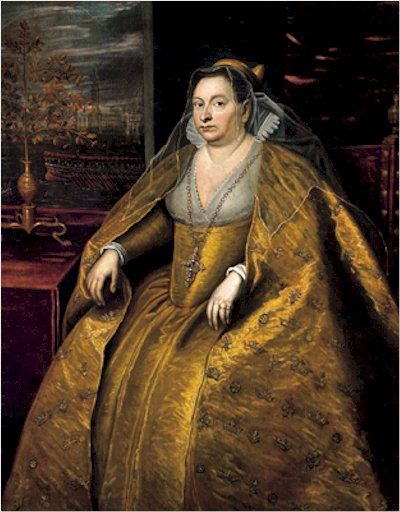
- The Dogaressa by Tintoretto 1590’s

Dogaressa of Venice
- Reign: 26 April 1595 - 25 December 1605
- Ceremony: May 1597
- Predecessor: Laura Morozini
- Successor: Paolina Loredano
- Born: c. 1545; Venice, Republic of Venice
- Died: January 21, 1614 (aged 68–69); Venice, Republic of Venice
- Spouse: Marino Grimani (m. 1560; died 1605)
- Dynasty: Morosini (by birth); Grimani (by marriage)
- Father: Andrea Morosini
- Religion: Roman Catholic

Morosina Morosini-Grimani (1545 - January 21, 1614) was a Venetian patrician. She was the Dogaressa of Venice from 1595 to 1605.

== Life ==
Morosina Morosini-Grimani was the daughter of Andrea Morosini, a wealthy Venetian patrician. She married in 1560 to Marino Grimani.

With her spouse's election as doge in 1595, her own coronation as official dogaressa consort was conducted with enormous pomp and ceremony in May 1597. No other dogaressa would be crowned after her until Elisabetta Querini in 1694, who would be the last dogaressa to be crowned. The ceremony was conducted with the purpose of surpassing all previous seen in Venice, and celebrated with processions of gondolas, banquets for foreign princes and ambassadors and dignitaries of the church, and the dogaressa was given the Golden Rose by the Papal envoy.

Dogaressa Morosina was described as ambitious, gracious and hospitable. She became the patron of the famous lace-making industry at Burano, and established a committee to promote and popularize the craft among the upper class women of Venice.

Morosina survived her spouse and died at the age of seventy. She did not follow the tradition that the dowager dogaressa should enter a convent, but devoted herself to charitable and devout projects. She restored the Church of San Sebastiano from her own private fortune.

Preceded by Cecilia Contarini	Dogaressa of Venice; 1595–1606	Paolina Loredano
