= Reniero Zeno =

Doge of Venice from 1253 to 1268

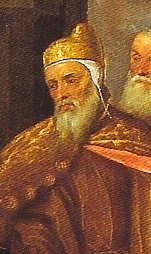
- Reniero Zeno, detail of fresco by Palma il Giovane, Oratorio dei Crociferi, Venice.

Doge of Venice
- In office 1253–1268
- Preceded by: Marino Morosini
- Succeeded by: Lorenzo Tiepolo

Personal details
- Born: Unknown
- Died: 7 July 1268
- Spouse: Loicia da Prata

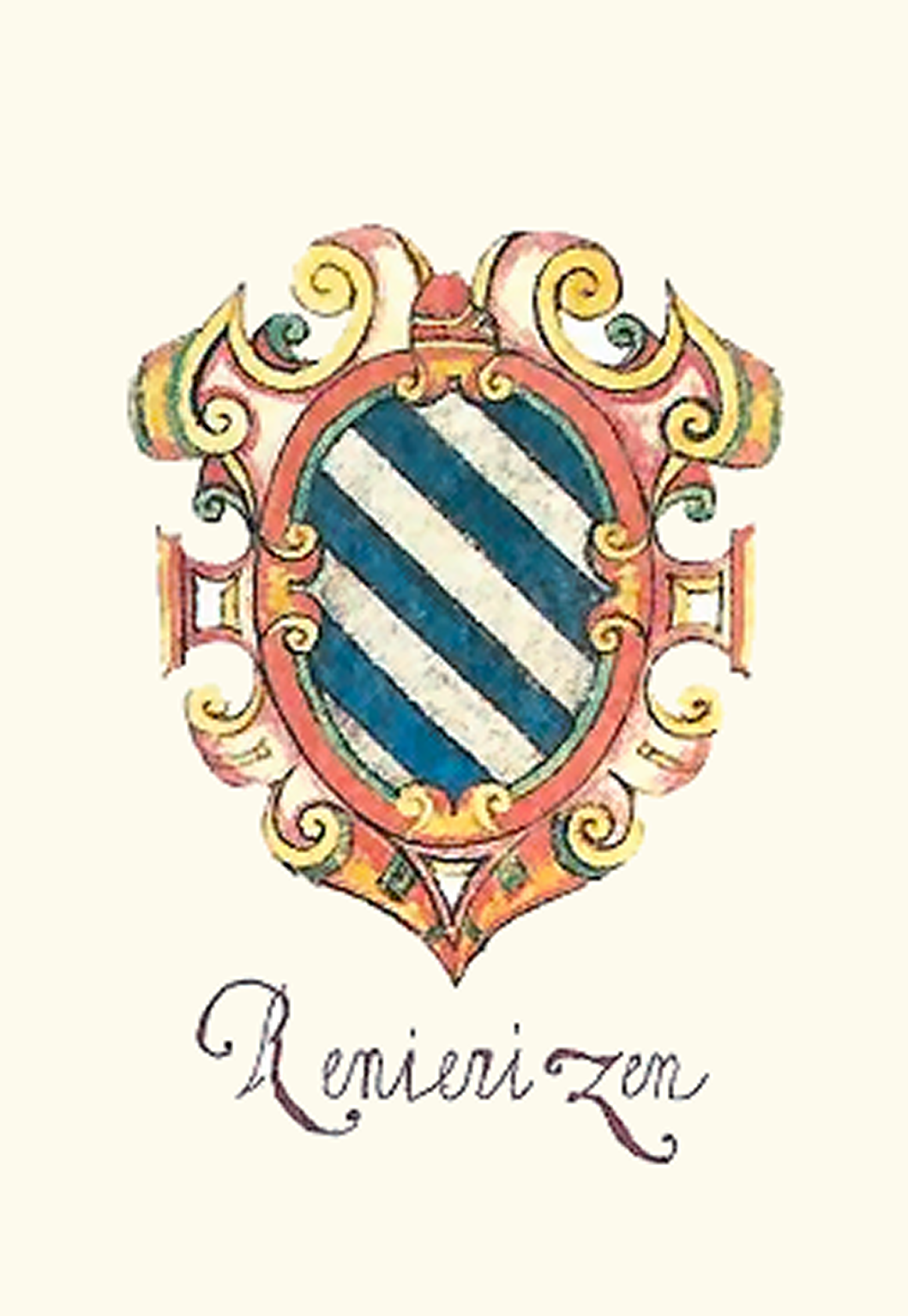
Coat of arms of Reniero Zeno

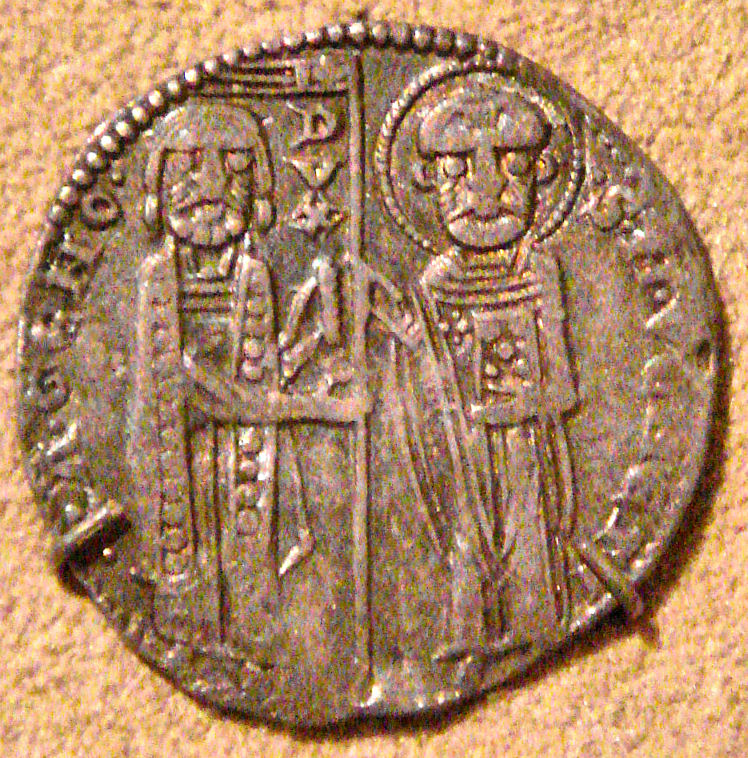
Silver Grosso of Doge Raniero Zeno, 1253–1268, Venice.

Reniero Zeno (Venetian: Renieri Zen) (died 7 July 1268) was the 45th Doge of Venice, reigning from 1 January 1253 until his death in 1268.

== Life ==
The first references to Reniero Zeno in historical sources describe him as a diplomat in France and Italy, where he was excommunicated for having pushed Bologna to avoid paying tributes to the Papal States. In 1240 he helped Doge Jacopo Tiepolo during the siege of Ferrara, in 1242 put down a revolt in Zara and in 1244 he was named capitano generale da Mar (fleet commander) of the Republic of Venice. He was also the podestà (Chief Magistrate) of numerous Italian cities.

After the death of Marino Morosini, Zeno, who was then podestà of Fermo, was elected Doge with 21 out of 41 votes. In 1256–1259 he, already lifted from the excommunication, helped Pope Alexander IV and Treviso in the war for the Marca Trevigiana against the Ghibelline warlord Ezzelino IV da Romano, whose death resolved the conflict.

In the meantime, Venice found itself engaged in a war against the Republic of Genoa, its greatest rival in the Mediterranean. The cause of the conflict was the sacking by the Genoese of the Venetian quarter in Tyre. When the future Doge Lorenzo Tiepolo destroyed the Genoese fleet in 1257, Genoa allied with Michael VIII Palaeologus, who in 1261 captured Constantinople, putting an end to the Latin Empire and awarding Genoans the privileges formerly held by Venetians. Venice replied by building a large fleet which again defeated the Genoese in Settepozzi in 1263.

In 1268 a five-year truce was signed with Byzantine Empire which restored to the Venetians many of their former priviliegies, establishing an uneasy balance between the two maritime republics, allowing them to compete freely in the Levant.

Also, under Zeno's reign a series of 129 law articles were approved which gave Venice a modern maritime legislation. Zeno died in Venice in 1268. His dogaressa was Loicia da Prata, described as beautiful and charitable. He was interred in the Basilica di San Giovanni e Paolo, a traditional burial place of the doges.

Political offices
Preceded by Marino Morosini	Doge of Venice; 1252–1268	Succeeded by Lorenzo Tiepolo
