= Matelda Faliero =

Dogaressa of Venice

Matelda (d. after 1117) was the Dogaressa of Venice by-marriage to the Doge Ordelafo Faliero (r. 1102–1117).

She is said to have been the cousin or sister of King Baldwin I of Jerusalem. Matelda has traditionally been described as an ideal of spousal fidelity. During her time as Dogaressa, Venice was struck by several natural disasters, and during those, Matelda led the women of Venice in prayer to soften the perceived wrath of God. In 1117, she warned Ordelafo not to wage war on Byzantium claiming that his duty was to his people in the time of crisis. After the Zara campaign, wherein the Doge was killed, she received the religious artifacts taken as war prizes from when they were brought to Venice, and installed them in San Maggiore. After this, she joined the convent of San Zaccaria.

Preceded by Felicia Cornaro	Dogaressa of Venice; 1102–1116	Dogaressa Alicia
