= Paolina Loredano =

Paolina Loredan
- Dogaressa of Venice
- Predecessor: Morosina Morosini
- Successor: Elisabetta Querini
- Spouse: Doge Carlo Contarini
- Issue: Andrea, Elisabetta, Lorenzo, Lorenzo, Giovan Battista, Cecilia, Lorenza, Comelia
- Dynasty: House of Loredan
- Father: Lorenzo Loredan

Paolina Loredan (died 10 April 1660), was the Dogaressa of Venice by marriage to Doge Carlo Contarini (r. 1655–1656) and a member of the noble Loredan family.

== Biography ==
Paolina Loredan was born to Lorenzo Loredan. On 20 February 1601, she married the future Doge, Carlo Contarini, who was 20 years old at the time, in the church of San Polo. She brought an enormous dowry of 26,000 ducats into the marriage, which enabled him to finance his later, extremely lavish embassy trips and contributed significantly to his election as Doge.

The couple had four sons – two of whom were named Lorenzo, the other two sons Giovan Battista and Andrea – and four daughters, namely Cecilia, Lorenza, Cornelia, and Elisabetta. Andrea (1601–1675) married Chiara Foscari in 1625, but she died in 1634. His second marriage was to Contarina Dolfin. He went to Warsaw as an envoy to congratulate the new King of Poland on his accession to the throne; he also received the Emperor in Trieste. In 1645, he was appointed Procurator of San Marco for 25,000 ducats.

Paolina was known for her decision never to appear in any public ceremonial. Described as an "immensely stout woman and unusually plain-looking", she was reportedly afraid that "the salutations of the populace would not partake of their usually complimentary character", and that she would have been mocked because of her appearance.

Paolina, who died in 1660, was buried in the tomb of her husband, who had been buried four years earlier, in San Vidal, a parish to which the couple had left extensive legacies, having been great benefactors of the clergy. However, the tomb was claimed by a later Doge, namely Alvise Pisani. The portrait busts (sculpted by Giuseppe Guoccola) of Paolina Loredan and her husband were moved to the church's façade (albeit without mentioning their names), which violated the otherwise strict prohibition against self-glorification of the Doges in public spaces outside of churches and private spaces. After 1859, the couple's human remains were lost in the course of secularisation and reconstruction.

Paolina Loredan's final will and testament can be seen in the State Archives of Venice.

Preceded by Morosina Morosini	Dogaressa of Venice; 1655–1656	Elisabetta Querini
