= Giovanni Dolfin =

Doge of Venice from 1356 to 1361

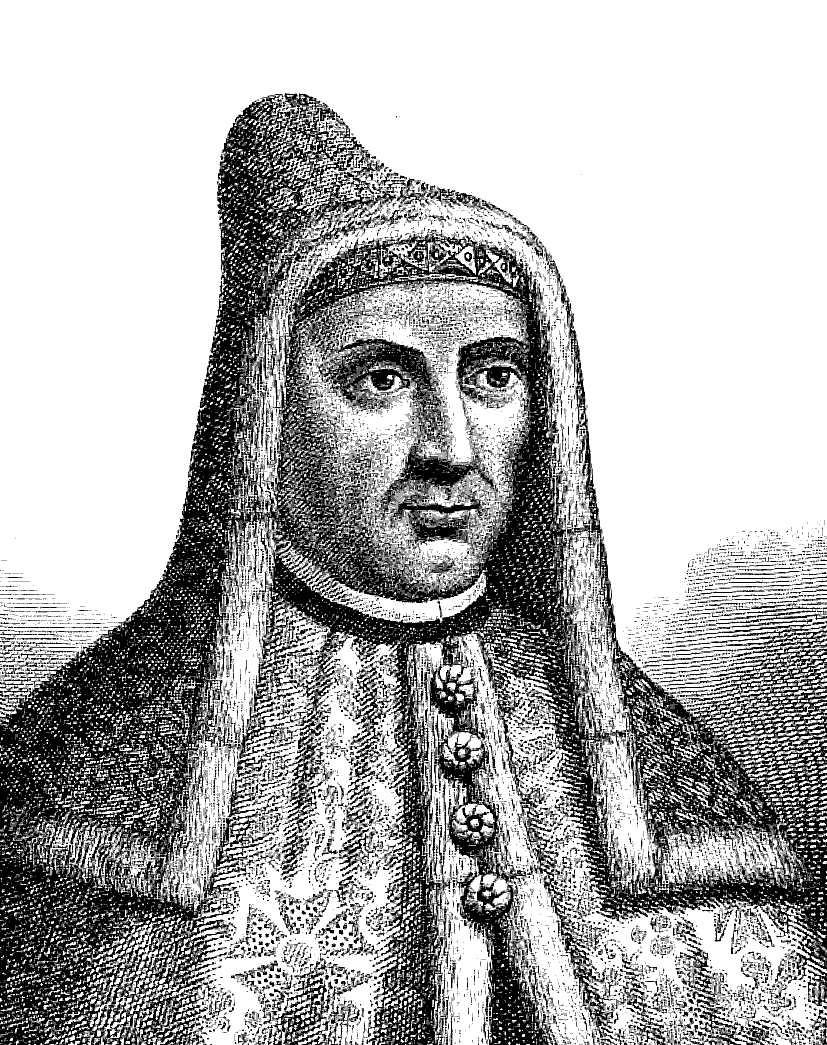
- 19th-century portrait of Giovanni Dolfin

Doge of Venice
- In office 1356–1361
- Preceded by: Giovanni Gradenigo
- Succeeded by: Lorenzo Celsi

Personal details
- Born: c. 1303
- Died: 12 July 1361

Giovanni Dolfin (c. 1303 – 12 July 1361), also known as Giovanni Delfino or Delfin, was the 57th Doge of Venice from 13 August 1356 until his death on 12 July 1361. Despite his value as a general, during his reign Venice lost Dalmatia.

== Biography ==
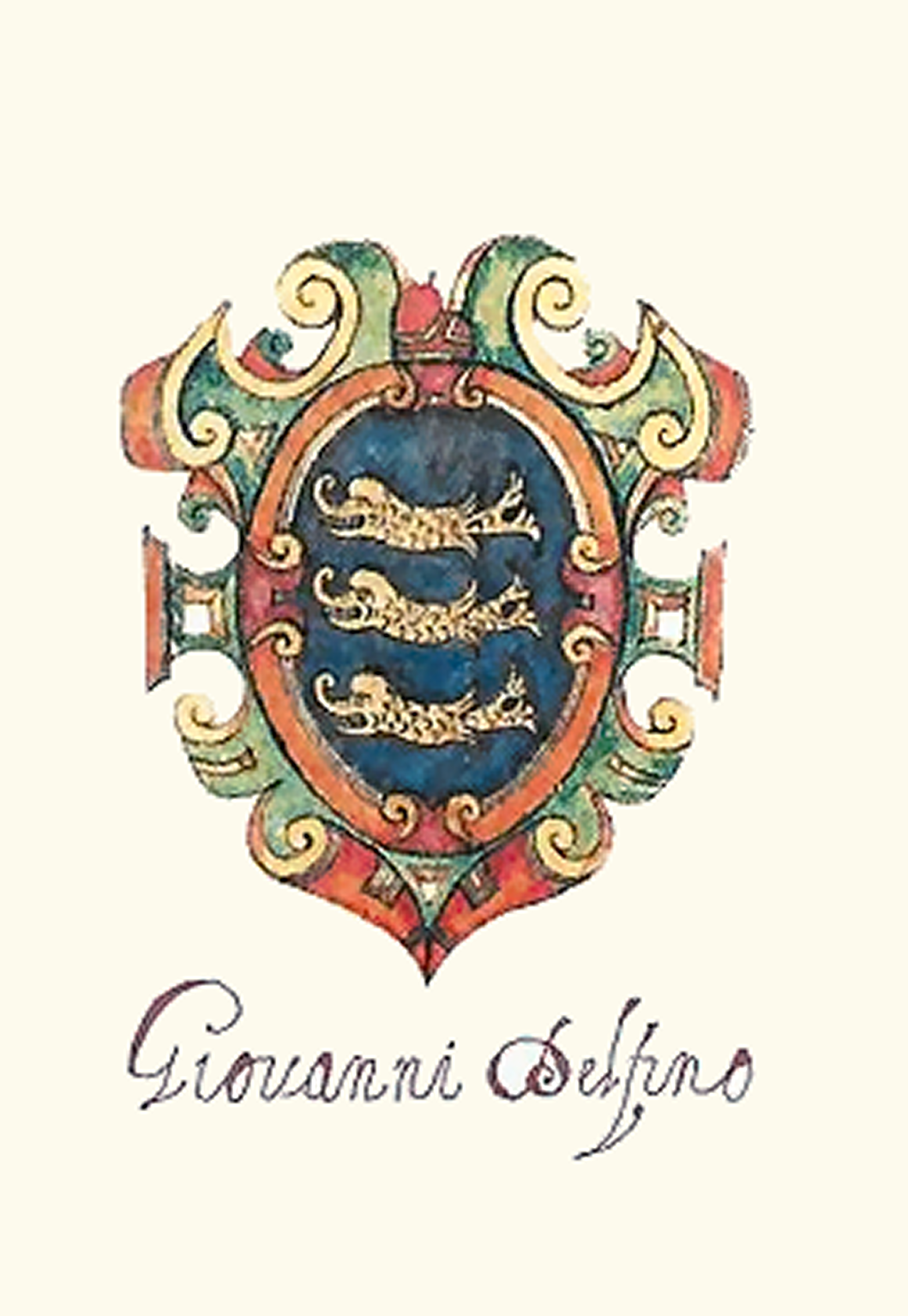
Coat of arms of Giovanni Dolfin

He was born c. 1303, in Venice, into one of the most ancient, noble and wealthy families of the city, as the son of Gregorio Delfin. The Dolfin family was allied with the Gradenigo, with whom they shared a common origin. Since the aristocratic coup of 1297, the Dolfin and the Gradenigo where among the favourites to occupy the ducal throne, and so they did, one after the other (Giovanni Dolfin's brother in law, Giovanni Gradenigo was doge before him). Dolfin was elected while defending Treviso, then besieged by Hungarian troops; being denied safe passage by his enemies, he broke the encirclement and reached Venice to be enthroned. He was appointed doge on 13 August 1356.

In the war which had broken out under Dolfin's predecessor, Hungary under King Louis I had conquered Dalmatia and was pushing other Venetian colonies to revolt. The Venetian defeat at Nervesa in February 1358 forced the Republic to sue for peace. In the resulting Treaty of Zadar the Venetians lost Dalmatia, Zara and Split, but maintained their naval predominance in the Adriatic Sea as the King of Hungary accepted not to build a fleet of his own. Also in 1358–1359 Padua started to menace the Venetian trades on the Brenta River and forced the city to stop trading with Egypt. These events triggered an economical crisis in Venice, which ended only after the War of Chioggia, in 1382. He was blinded in one eye after a wound received in battle.

Dolfin died in 1361 and was buried in the Basilica di San Giovanni e Paolo, a traditional burial place of the doges. His funerary monument is still visible today, showing the coat of arms of the noble Dolfin family.

== In fiction ==
The plot of Donna Leon's 2000 Detective Mystery novel Friends in High Places, set in contemporary Venice, involves present-day (fictional) descendants of the Dolfin family, who are inordinately proud of their descent from the 14th-century doge (and who have little else to be proud of).

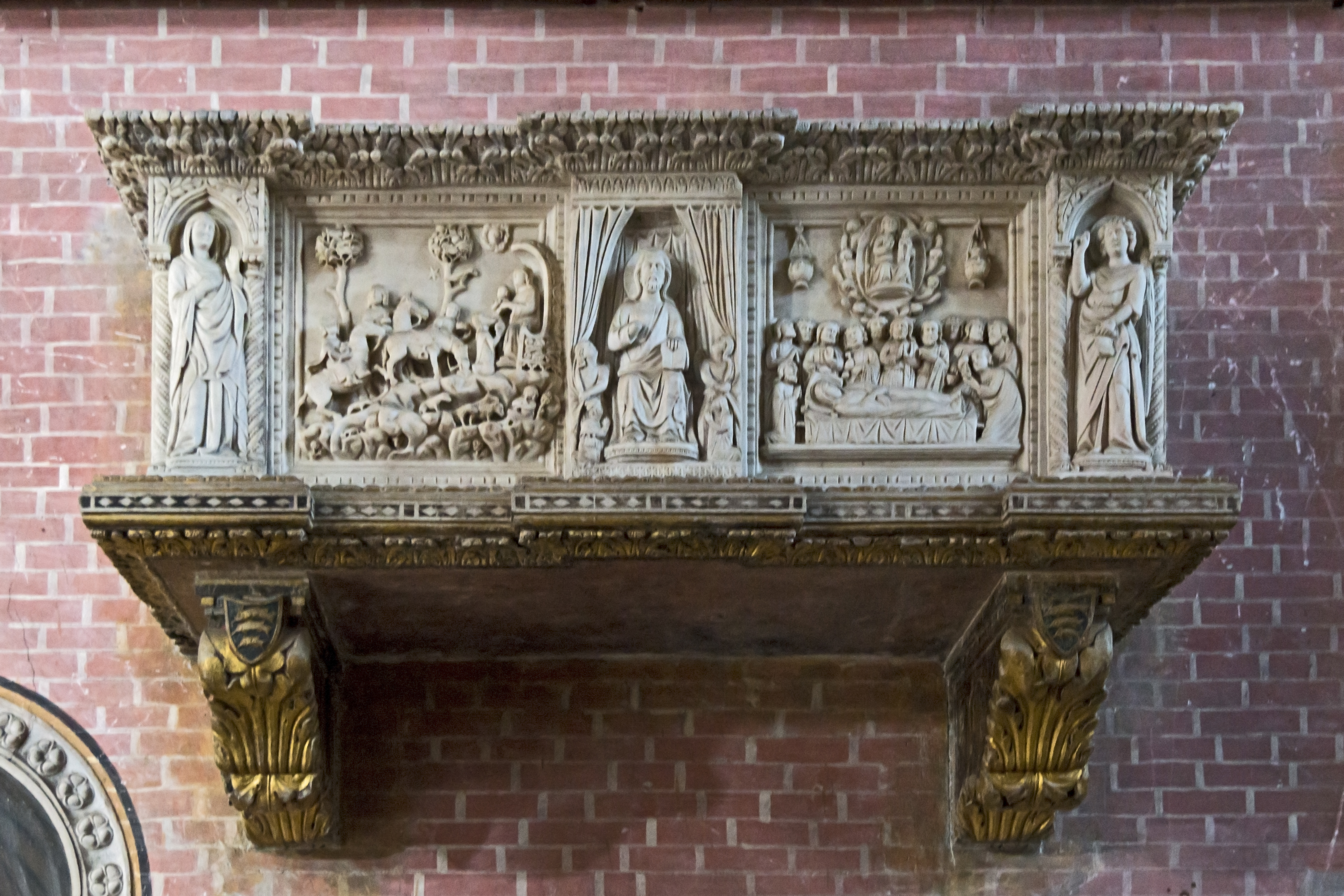
Tome of the Doge in Venice

== See also ==
- Treaty of Zadar

Political offices
Preceded by Giovanni Gradenigo	Doge of Venice; 1356–1361	Succeeded by Lorenzo Celsi
