= Polissena Contarini Da Mula =

Dogaressa of Venice

Polissena Contarini Da Mula (died May 1833), was a Venetian salonniére. She was the daughter-in-law of the Doge Alvise Giovanni Mocenigo (r. 1763-1779). Due to her father-in-law being a widower, she played the role of dogaressa during his reign. She was the hostess of a cultural salon of patronage and literature in the Doge's villa.

== Life ==
Polissena Contarini was the daughter of Messir Giulio Contarini-Da Mula. She married Alvise Mocenigo Jr., the eldest son and namesake of the Doge, on 5 June 1771.

She played a representational role during the reign of her father-in-law and filled the role of dogaressa, though she does not seem to have played to part of dogaressa in a ceremonial sense as dogaressa Pisana Cornaro. She was the center of the literary circle her consort gathered on his private country villa, Villa Mocenigo, where she became the object and muse of many poets. Carlo Gozzi prepared comic plays for the theatre of the Palace.

She was a hostess and center figure of the patronage and cultural salon in the Doge's country villa, where the Doge gathered "all the young, bright and talented people he could around him", and where:

"Madonna Polissena Contarini-Da Mula-Mocenigo, was the centre of a little Court of high-souled admirers who greeted "L'Alme tue glorie echeggiano Ecclesa Polissena...."

Preceded by Pisana Cornaro	Dogaressa of Venice; 1771–1779	Margherita Dalmet
