= Marco Foscarini =

Doge of Venice from 1762 to 1763

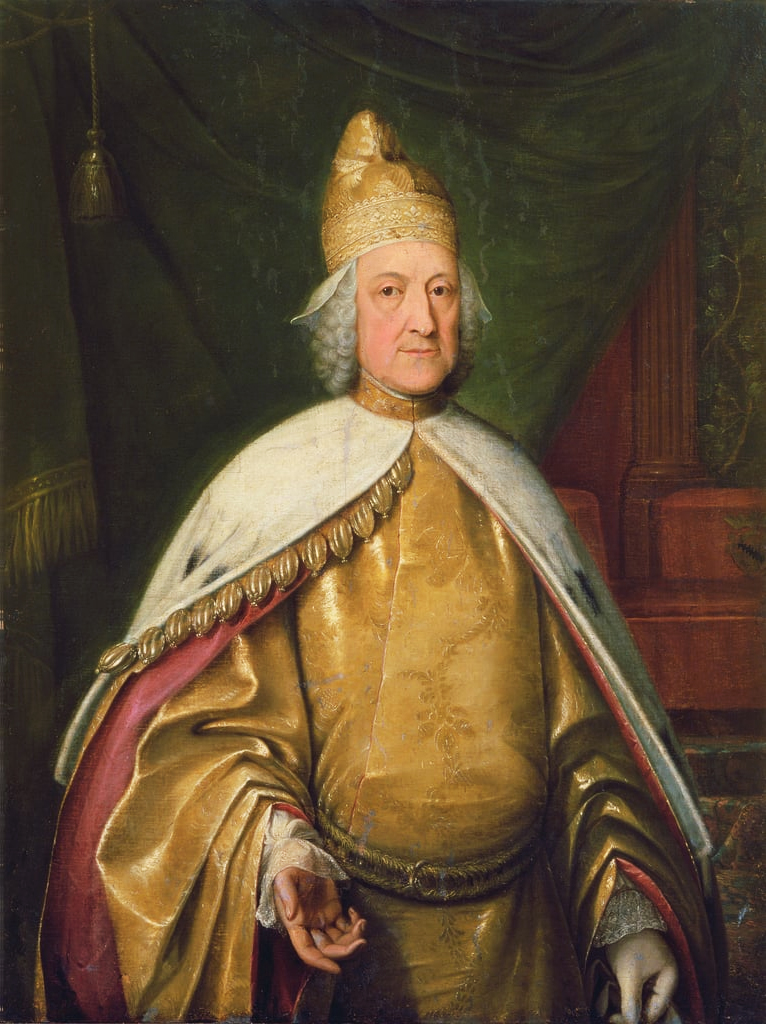

Doge of Venice
- In office 1762–1763
- Preceded by: Francesco Loredan
- Succeeded by: Alvise Giovanni Mocenigo

Personal details
- Born: 4 February 1696 Venice, Republic of Venice
- Died: 31 March 1763 (aged 67) Pontelongo, Republic of Venice

Marco Foscarini (4 February 1696 in Venice – 31 March 1763 in Venice) was a Venetian poet, writer and statesman who served as the 117th Doge of Venice from 31 May 1762 until his death 14 months later. He studied in his youth in Bologna, and was active as a diplomat, serving as ambassador to the Holy See and to Savoy; he also served as the Procurator of St Mark's for a time. He was succeeded as Doge by Alvise Giovanni Mocenigo.

Foscarini was elected Fellow of the Royal Society in 1759, as a 'nobleman of distinguished learning and merit'.

Liceo classico Marco Foscarini, a school in Venice, was named after him to honour his History of Venetian literature.

Political offices
Preceded by Francesco Loredan	Doge of Venice; 1762–1763	Succeeded by Alvise Giovanni Mocenigo
