= Alicia Giustiniani =

Dogaressa of Venice

Alicia Giustiniani was the Dogaressa of Venice by marriage to the Doge Francesco Donato (r. 1545–1553).

As dogaressa, she, as well as her predecessor Maria Pasqualigo, did what she could to support arts and crafts in Venice. One of her acts was redecorating the apartments of Doge's Palace.

Giustiniani was foremost known for her work for the Venetian glass industry of Murano, which suffered from problems and discontent among the workers between 1547 and 1549. Giustiniani was the formal protector of the glass guild. She received their complaints and worked to address them. In 1550, she used her influence to reintroduce several reforms of the glass industry regulations. Among other things, she restored the permission to travel abroad to glassmakers.

Preceded by Maria Pasqualigo	Dogaressa of Venice; 1545–1553	Zilia Dandolo
