= Pisana Cornaro =

Dogaressa of Venice (1763–1769)

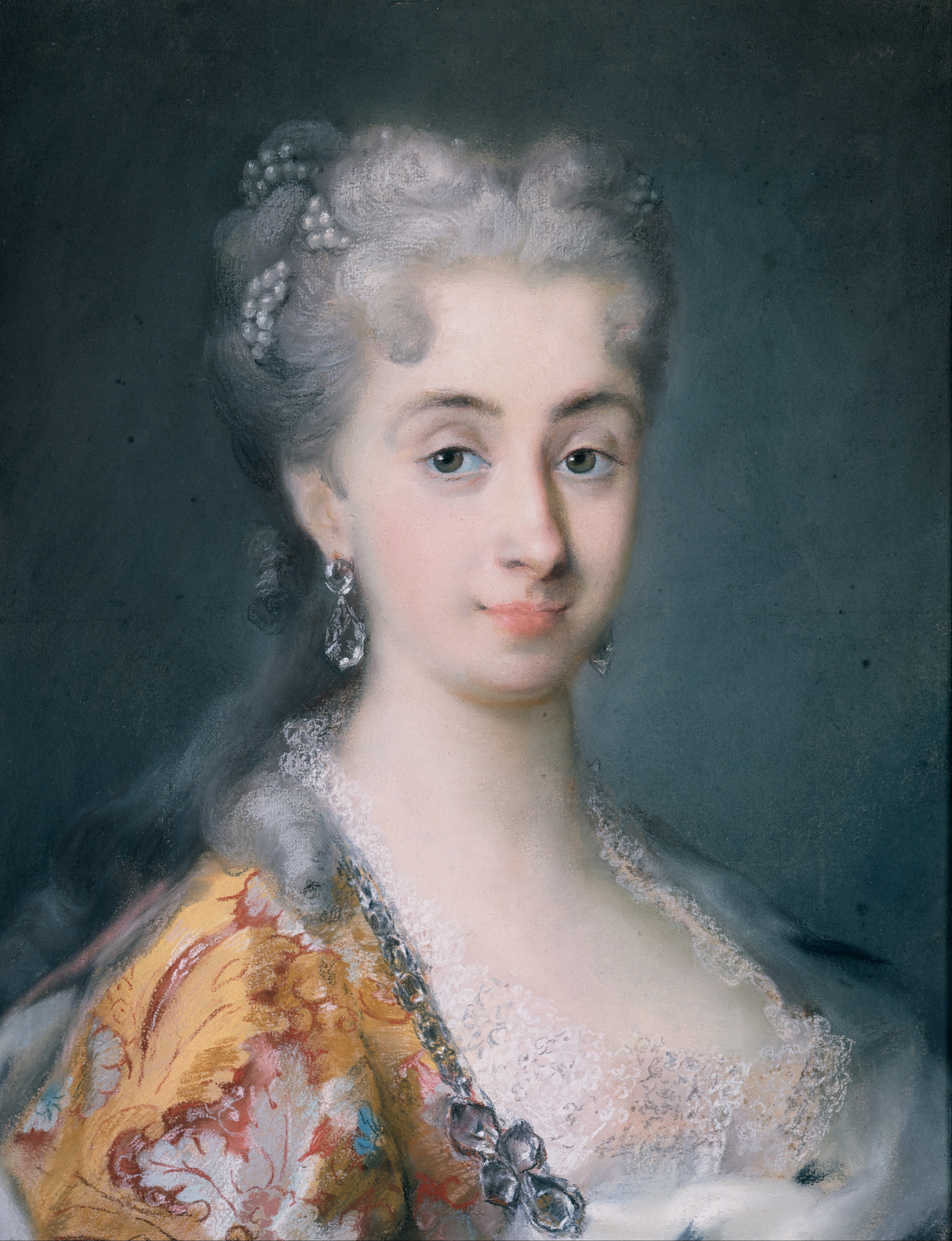
18th-century pastel portrait by Rosalba Carriera on paper

Pisana Cornaro (died 10 March 1769) or Pisana Corner (Note: The surname Cornaro can be spelled as Corner, a form of the Venetian language, which was adopted in the eighteenth century.) (Venetian: [koɾˈnɛɾ], Italian: [korˈnɛr]), was an Italian noblewoman, she became Dogaressa of Venice by marriage as the first wife of the Doge Alvise IV Mocenigo (r. 1763–1779).

== Biography ==
=== Marriage and children ===
Arms of the Cornaro family

Pisana Cornaro was born in Venice, she was the daughter of Federico Cornaro (born 1676). On 5 October 1739, she married Alvise Giovanni Mocenigo. Pisano and Alvise had six sons (all of whom were named Alvise) and two daughters named Cecilia and Maria, who died as children.

=== Dogaressa of Venice: 1763–1769 ===
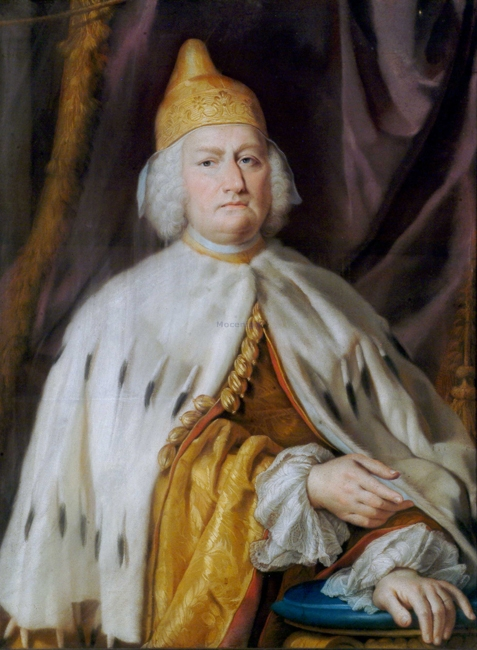
Pastel portrait of Doge Alvise IV Mocenigo on paper, c. 1763

In 1763, her husband was elected doge. Pisana became the first dogaressa since Laura Cornaro forty years earlier: while Elena Badoer, wife of Alvise Pisani (r. 1735-1741) has often been referred to as dogaressa, she in fact died in 1729, six years before her husband became doge. Her elevation was therefore a sort of resurrection of the office.

Upon her husband's election as doge, he reintroduced the ceremony of the Solemn Entry of the dogaressa, as well as the other ceremonies surrounding her, rituals which had been abolished during the 17th century. On 22 April 1763, Dogaressa Pisana therefore celebrated her entry followed by all the traditional rituals, such as to receive the representatives from the city guilds, with the exception of the coronation. These ceremonies attracted much attention and were seen as a sign that the former grandness of Venice should return.

Pisana was described as a simple and retiring person, more interested in her household than in her role as dogaressa, who abhorred pomp and became popular for her involvement in charity. In 1766, she presided at the marriage of her son to Francesca Grimani. She was deeply affected by the early death of her daughter-in-law, and lost interest in public life. She spent much of her time at the country villa in Cordignano, where she was popular as a good employer.

In the work "On the Character, Customs, and Female Mind", the French academician Thomas described her:

"Let us mention a Venetian matron who was really wise, pious, and gifted with dignity as well as excellent qualities. She was not old when she died. People will at once perceive that I am alluding to Pisana Cornaro Mocenigo, whose nobleness of character, piety, and learning were unrivalled, and besides amusing herself with astronomical observations and natural history, took a singular pleasure in the study of anatomy, in which she made such great progress that she excited the admiration of the illustrious Frotomedico Santorini, and also of the immortal Giambattista Morgagni, prince of the anatomists of our time. We have scattered these few flowers on the tomb of the late renowned Dogaressa, although her happy spirit is sufficiently requited by the tribute of tears and constant regret offered to her memory by her loving husband, H. Serene H. Alvise Mocenigo."

After her death, her spouse remarried Polissena Contarini Da Mula in 1771, though she does not seem to have played to part of dogaressa in a ceremonial sense as much as did Pisana Cornaro, though she did become the center of the literary circle her consort gathered at his private villa.

Preceded by Laura Cornaro	Dogaressa of Venice; 1763–1769	Polissena Contarini Da Mula
