= Cristina Sanudo =

Dogaressa of Venice

Cristina Sanudo (circa 1400 – 12 December 1471) was the Dogaressa of Venice by marriage to the Doge Cristoforo Moro (r. 1462–1471).

She was the daughter of Leonardo Sanudo and Barbara Memo, and married Cristoforo Moro in 1412. She would have been a teenager at the time of her marriage, possibly as young as twelve, as this was common in her class, and should thus have been born about the year of 1400 or a little earlier. She brought a large dowry and valuable contacts to several leading families within the Venetian textile industry. She had only one child, the son Nicolò, who died young, unmarried and childless.

In 1462, her spouse was elected doge. Cristina Sanudo engaged herself in the textile industry. She banned some imports and certain fashions deemed immodest, opposed the import of foreign goods and protected Venetian manufacture. In correspondence to her disdain of immodesty, the church in the shape of the abbot Frate Mauro Lapi asked her to ban her male courtiers from wearing long hair as this was seen as frivolous for men. She was known and popular for her charity.

She survived the death of her spouse in 1471, as she is noted to have made her own will later that same year.

Preceded by Giovanna Dandolo	Dogaressa of Venice; 1462–1471	Aliodea Morosini
