= Aliodea Morosini =

Dogaressa of Venice

Aliodea Morosini, called "Dea Moro" (died 1478), was the Dogaressa of Venice by marriage to the Doge Nicolò Tron (r. 1471-1473).

She was described by the chronicler Palazzo as the greatest beauty of the century, and legend claims that her beauty was of importance for the election of her spouse as doge because of the great beauty cult in Venice at the time. However, she was born to Silvestro Morosini and of an elder and more powerful family than her spouse, who was described as an upstart careerist. The coronation of her as a dogaressa was described as more magnificent than any previous in the history of Venice. She was described as a humble person. As a widow she retired to a convent and refused a state burial.

Preceded by Cristina Sanudo	Dogaressa of Venice; 1471–1473	Contarina Contarini Morosini
