= Felicia Cornaro =

Dogaressa of Venice

Felicia Cornaro (died 1111) was the Dogaressa of Venice by marriage to the Doge Vitale I Michiel (r. 1096–1102). She was politically active and exerted an acknowledged influence over the affairs of state. She was a strong supporter of the First Crusade.

== Life ==
She is described as an ideal of simplicity, virtue and modesty for the women of Venice, in contrast to what had been the case with the previous dogaressa, Theodora Anna Doukaina Selvo. During the First Crusade, she organised the funds necessary to establish hospitals, beds and food for the pilgrims and crusaders, and set an example by selling her jewelry and clothes and cutting down the representation of the doge court life. She also encouraged the mothers to send their sons away to serve in the crusade. In 1099, the Venetians financed an escort fleet to protect the crusaders on their way to Syria. The influence of Felicia upon the affairs of state was common knowledge: Mathilda of Tuscany asked Felicia to persuade Venice to assist her to pacify the rebellious Ferrara, something Felicia also successfully did.

Preceded by Cornella Bembo	Dogaressa of Venice; 1096–1102	Dogaressa Matelda
