= Laura Cornaro =

Dogaressa of Venice

Laura Cornaro (died 1739) was the Dogaressa of Venice by marriage to the Doge Giovanni II Cornaro (r. 1709-1722).

Laura Cornaro was born to Nicolo Cornaro and married her cousin Giovanni II Cornaro in 1667.

In 1709, her husband was elected doge, and she subsequently became dogaressa. As dogaressa, Laura Cornaro was described as strict and prudish and in opposition to the greater personal freedom which became more evident in the Venetian aristocracy in the 18th-century: "at all events the fast life of the nobles and their ladies had no charms for her, and she set her face resolutely against the extravagances and indecencies around her".

As a widow, Cornaro became a postulant of the Order of the Augustinians of SS. Gervaso e Protasio. She was the last dogaressa for forty years: while Elena Badoer, wife of Alvise Pisani (r. 1735-1741) has often been referred to as dogaressa, she in fact died in 1729, six years before her husband became doge.

Preceded by Elisabetta Querini	Dogaressa of Venice; 1709–1722	Pisana Cornaro
