= Elisabetta Querini =

Dogaress of Venice

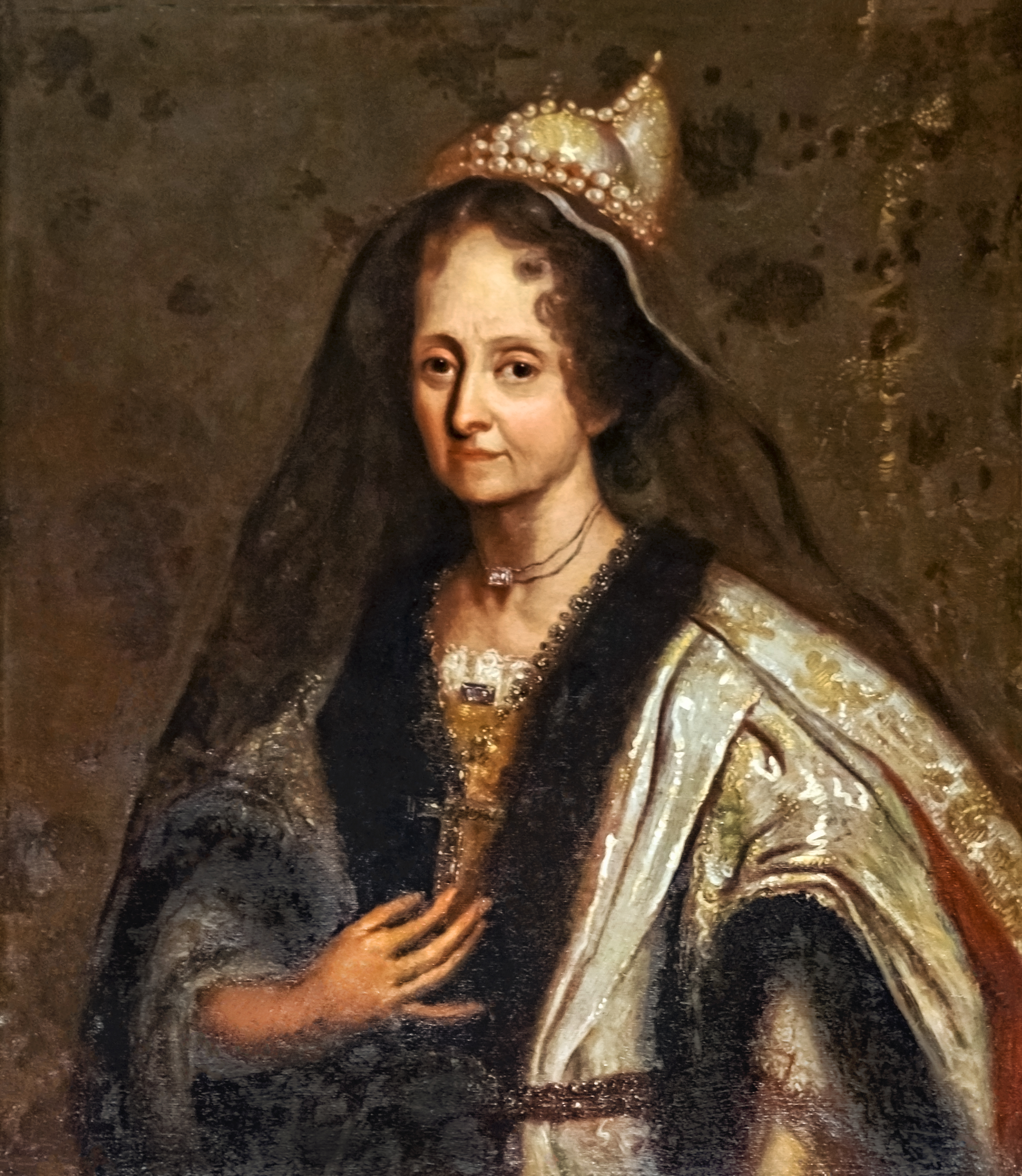
- Elisabetta Querini portrayed by Niccolò Cassana

Dogaressa of Venice
- Reign: 25 February 1694 - 7 July 1700
- Coronation: March 4, 1694,Doge's Palace
- Predecessor: Paolina Loredano
- Successor: Laura Cornaro
- Born: November 12, 1628; Venice, Republic of Venice
- Died: January 19, 1709 (aged 80); Venice, Republic of Venice
- Burial: San Zanipolo
- Spouse: Silvestro Valier (m. 1649; died 1700)
- Dynasty: Querini (by birth); Valier (by marriage)
- Father: Paolo Querini
- Mother: Bianca Ruzzini
- Religion: Roman Catholic

Elisabetta Querini (November 12, 1628 in Venice – January 19, 1709 in Venice) was the Dogaressa of Venice by marriage to the Doge Silvestro Valier (r. 1694–1700).

== Early life ==
Elisabetta was born as the daughter of the procurator Paolo Querini of the Stampalia branch of the family and his wife Bianca Ruzzini, from whose family the Doge Carlo Ruzzini emerged. The Querini family lived in a palace near Santa Maria Formosa, now the headquarters of the Fondazione Querini Stampaglia. In addition to 10 houses near the family palace, Elisabetta owned land near Padua, in Polesine and near Verona, as well as a foundry near Mira. On 8 August 1649, she married the 19-year-old Silvestro Valier, son of Doge Bertuccio Valier. She brought a dowry of 40,000 ducats into the marriage.

== Dogaressa of Venice ==
On February 25, 1694, Silvestro was elected doge. On March 4, Elisabetta was crowned dogaressa with great pomp in the Doge's Palace with a gold corno studded with precious stones, which was forbidden by a law of 1645. After the election of the doge, both generously distributed silver oselle to the people, and they also made themselves popular with the people by organizing festivals and entertainments.

== Later life and death ==
After the death of her husband in 1700, as a widow, Elisabetta oversaw the construction of a huge funerary monument at San Zanipolo, where she was buried next to the two Valier Doges. The Valier Tomb, built between 1705 and 1708 based on a design by Andrea Tirali, is the last of the great Doge's tombs in Venice. Elisabetta died without children. She bequeathed part of her fortune to her cousin Giovanni Antonio Ruzzini, father of eleven children and brother of the future Doge Carlo Ruzzini. She ordered a thousand masses for herself in her will. She gave legacies to a number of relatives, friends, churches, and charitable institutions, including a sum of 10,000 ducats to the Ospedale der Zitelle.

== Gallery ==
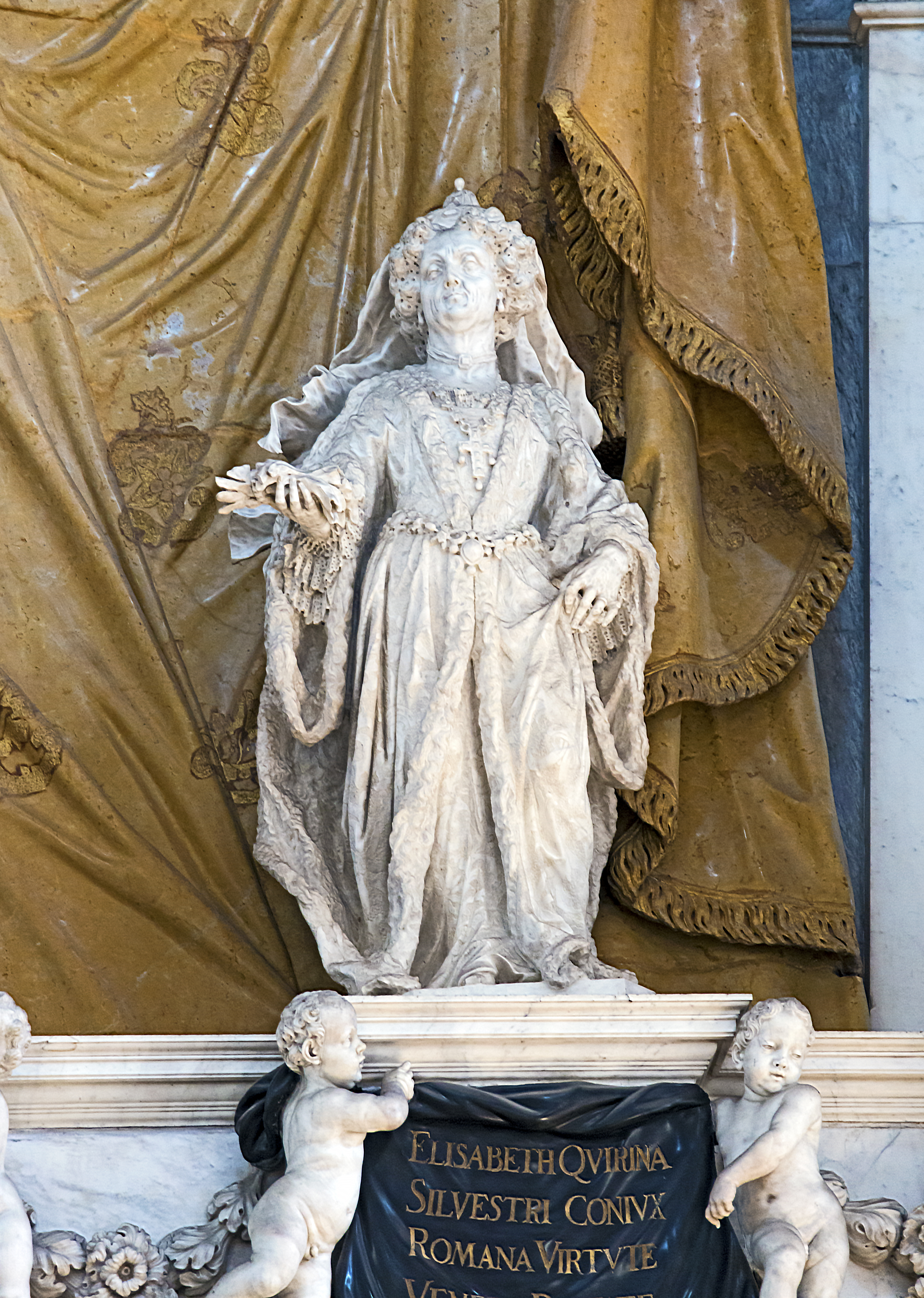
Elisabetta Querini by Giovanni Bonazza
