= Alvise Giovanni Mocenigo =

Doge of Venice from 1763 to 1778

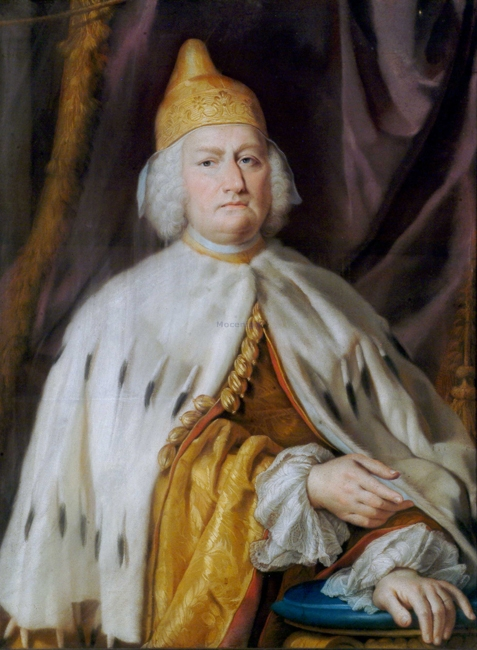
- Portrait by Francesco Pavona, 1763

Doge of Venice
- Reign: 1763 – 31 December 1778
- Predecessor: Marco Foscarini
- Successor: Paolo Renier
- Born: 19 May 1701
- Died: 31 December 1778 (aged 77); Venice, Republic of Venice
- Spouse: Pisana Cornaro (m. 1739–1769)
- Religion: Roman Catholicism

Alvise Giovanni Mocenigo (19 May 1701– 31 December 1778), sometimes enumerated Alvise IV Mocenigo, was the 118th doge of Venice from 1763 until his death.

== Political career ==
He restricted the privileges of the clergy and, in consequence, came into bitter conflict with Pope Clement XIII.

In trying to spur on the economy, he made important commercial agreements with Tripoli, Tunisia, Morocco, the Russian Empire, and with America.

He died on 31 December 1778. He was married in 1739 to Pisana Cornaro (d. 1769) and in 1771 to Polissena Contarini Da Mula.

== See also ==
- Mocenigo family

== Sources ==
Political offices
| Preceded by Marco Foscarini | Doge of Venice; 1763–1778 | Succeeded by Paolo Renier |
