= Dogaressa =

Official title of the wife of the Doge of Venice

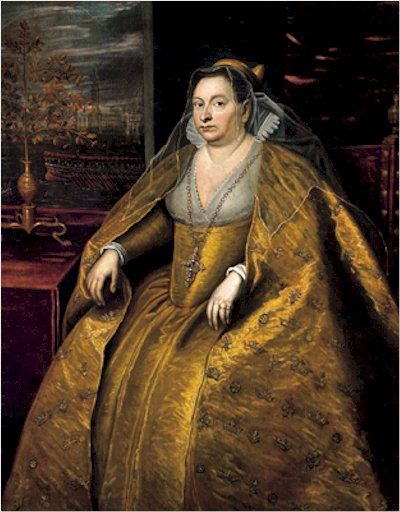
Dogaressa Morosina Morosini by Tintoretto, 1590s.

Dogaressa (/ˌdoʊɡəˈrɛsə, ˌdoʊdʒəˈ-/ DOH-gə-ress-ə, DOH-jə-, Italian: [doɡaˈressa], Venetian: [doɡaˈɾesa]) was the official title of the wife of the Doge of Venice. The title was unique for Venice: while the heads of the Republic of Genoa were also called Doge, the wives of the Doges of Genoa were not called Dogaressa, nor did they have such a public position.

== History ==
The first bearer of the title was reportedly Dogaressa Carola in the 800s, and the last was Elisabetta Grimani in the 1790s.

The position of the Dogaressa was regulated by the laws of the Republic, which specified which duties and rights she had, and what was prohibited to her. These rights changed several times during the history of the Republic.

=== Position ===
Just like the Doge, the Dogaressa was crowned, made a Solemn Entry, and gave a vow of loyalty (promissione ducale) to the republic upon her coronation. The symbols of her rank were a golden veil, and a crown in a similar shape as that of the Doge. Similar to a queen, the Dogaressa was provided with a household of ladies-in-waiting. The coronation of the Dogaressa was abolished during certain periods, as specified below.

Formally, the Dogaressa had no political rights whatsoever, and her task was to participate in the representational life of the republic through the official ceremonies and rituals designed to personify the glory of the state. Thus, she had a very visible public role. She was expected to act as the formal protector of certain guilds and trades, and could, as such, play an important part in the role of these trades within the state: something several Dogaressas are known to have done. Alicia Giustiniani, for example, played an important part in Venetian commerce and business because of this role.

Though the law disallowed any influence over affairs of state to the Dogaressa, some wielded a great deal of influence over such affairs in practice, most notably Felicia Cornaro.

When the Dogaressa became a widow, she was expected to become a nun. However, there was no actual law to require this, and some widowed Dogaressas refused to follow this custom, although doing so was considered scandalous.

=== Changes in position ===
During the centuries, the regulations around the Dogaressa introduced laws to restrict her rights. In the 13th century, the Dogaressa was banned from receiving dignitaries and making public donations on her own, and in 1342, a law banned her from conducting business affairs of her own.

The coronation ceremony of the Dogaressa did not occur between those of Taddea Michiel in 1478 and Zilia Dandolo in 1556. After the coronation of Morosina Morosini in 1597, the coronation of a Dogaressa was deemed unnecessary by 1645 and the other ceremonies around her were suppressed to a minimum. The last Dogaressa to be crowned was Elisabetta Querini in 1694, after which the ceremony was permanently abolished. After the tenure of Elisabetta Querini, most other ceremonial privileges of the Dogaressa was abolished as well: in 1700, she was no longer permitted to wear a crown or to receive gifts from dignitaries. In 1763, the Solemn Entry was revived by the wish of the Doge for Pisana Cornaro, who was the last Dogaressa to perform it.

== List of Dogaressas of Venice ==
- 804-811: Carola
- 811-827: Elena
- 827-830: Felicita
- 888-912: Angela Sanudo
- 942-959: Arcielda Candiano
- 959-966: Giovanniccia Candiano
- 966-976: Waldrada of Tuscany
- 976-978: Felicia Malipiero
- 979-991: Marina Candiano
- 991-1009: Maria Candiano
- 1009-1026: Grimelda of Hungary
- 1075-1083: Theodora Doukaina Selvo
- 1084-1096: Cornella Bembo
- 1096-1102: Felicia Cornaro
- 1102-1116: Matelda Falier
- 1116-1130: Alicia Michiel
- 1130-1144: Adelasa Michiel
- 1148-1156: Sofia Morosini
- 1156-1172: Felicita Maria di Boemondo
- 1172-1178: Cecilia (Froyza)
- 1192-1205: Felicita Bembo
- 1205-1213: Maria Basilio
- 1213-1229: Constance of Sicily
- 1229-1240: Maria Storlato
- 1242-1249: Valdrada of Sicily
- 1252-1268: Loicia da Prata
- 1268-1275: Marchesina Ghisi
- 1275-1280: Jacobina
- 1280-1289: Caterina
- 1289-1310: Tommasina Morosini
- 1310-1312: Agnese
- 1312-1329: Franchesina
- 1329-1339: Elisabetta
- 1339-1342: Giustina Cappello
- 1342-1354: Francesca Morosini
- 1354-1355: Aluycia Gradenigo
- 1355-1356: Marina Cappello
- 1361-1365: Maria Giustinian
- 1365-1367: Caterina Corner
- 1382-1382: Cristina Condulmer
- 1382-1400: Agnese da Mosto
- 1400-1413: Marina Galina
- 1423-1457: Marina Nani
- 1457-1462: Giovanna Dandolo
- 1462-1471: Cristina Sanudo
- 1471-1472: Aliodea Morosini
- 1473-1474: Contarina Contarini Morosini
- 1474-1476: Laura Zorzi (erroneously called dogaressa, but died in 1474 before her spouse became doge)
- 1476-1478: Regina Gradenigo
- 1478-1479: Taddea Michiel (d. 1479)
- 1485-1486: Lucia Ruzzini (d. 1496)
- 1486-1501: Elisabetta Soranzo
- 1501-1521: Morosina Giustinian di Pancrazio di Marco (erroneously called dogaressa, but died in 1501 before her spouse became doge)
- 1521-1523: Caterina Loredan
- 1523-1538: Benedetta Vendramin (erroneously called dogaressa, but died in 1477 before her spouse became doge)
- 1538-1545: Maria Pasqualigo
- 1545-1553: Alicia Giustiniani
- 1556-1559: Zilia Dandolo
- 1559-1567: Elena Diedo (erroneously called dogaressa, but died before her spouse became doge)
- 1567-1570: Maria Lucrezia Cappello (erroneously called dogaressa, but died before her spouse became doge)
- 1570-1572: Loredana Marcello
- 1577-1578: Cecilia Contarini
- 1578-1585: Arcangela Canali (often erroneously called dogaressa, but she died in 1566)
- 1585-1595: Laura Morosini (often erroneously called dogaressa, but she died in 1570)
- 1595-1606: Morosina Morosini
- 1618-1623: Elena Barbarigo (often erroneously called dogaressa, but she died in 1614)
- 1625-1629: Chiara Dolfin (often erroneously called dogaressa, but she died in 1623)
- 1655-1656: Paolina Loredan
- 1656-1656: Andriana Priuli (died 1656)
- 1656-1658: Elisabetta Pisani or Benedetta Pisani (often erroneously called dogaressa, but she died in 1655)
- 1658-1659: Lucia Barbarigo (predeceased the accession of her husband, who was then secretly married to Maria da Santa Sofia
- 1694-1700: Elisabetta Querini
- 1709-1722: Laura Cornaro
- 1735-1741: Elena Badoer (often erroneously called dogaressa, she died in 1729)
- 1763-1769: Pisana Cornaro
- 1771-1779: Polissena Contarini Da Mula (married to the son and namesake of the Doge, but filled the role of Dogaressa)
- 1779-1789: Margherita Dalmet
- 1789-1792: Elisabetta Grimani
