= Siege of Haifa (1100) =

- Part of the Crusades
Date	25 July – 20 August 1100
Location	Haifa, Levant
Result	Crusader victory
Territorial changes	Lordship of Haifa was created

Belligerents
Kingdom of Jerusalem; Republic of Venice	Fatimid Caliphate

Commanders and leaders
Tancred, Prince of Galilee; Dagobert of Pisa (Republic of Venice) Enrico Contarini	Unknown

Casualties and losses
Heavy	Heavy, defenders and civilians massacred

The Siege of Haifa was a military engagement between the Crusaders and the Fatimid garrison of Haifa. The Crusader besieged Haifa for a month. The Fatimid garrison alongside Jewish inhabitants bravely defended Haifa before losing the city to the Crusaders.

== Background ==
In the aftermath of the First Crusade, the coastal city of Jaffa fell to the Crusaders without a fight. The Crusaders realized that without a hold on the coast, their control of Jerusalem would fade away. The control of the coast would provide communications with Europe. Thus, in 1100, Godfrey of Bouillon, one of the First Crusade's commanders, intended to attack the major port of Acre. In June of the same year, a great armada of 200 Venetian ships arrived in Jaffa. Godfrey made a deal with the Venetians to help conquer coastal cities in exchange for custom exemption and construction of a quarter for them in every town they have control over, and in every town they conquer, they would receive one-third of the spoils. However, on July the 18th, Godfrey passed away. Tancred, Prince of Galilee, and Dagobert of Pisa, who were in command of the land forces, heard of Godfrey's death, changed plans, and ordered the Venetians to sail towards Haifa.

== Siege ==
The Crusader arrived in Haifa on 25 July. Haifa possesses a strong Jewish community; in Haifa, they assisted the Fatimid garrison in their defense. The Crusaders directed their focus on the city citadel. The Crusaders built a large siege tower and seven mangonels. They began their assault. The defenders repelled the assault using boiling oils and burning straws. For 15 days, the Crusaders assaulted the walls but were repelled each time. Tancred's morale began diminishing, and the Venetians began sailing away from Haifa due to strong resistance. Tancred decided to renew the assault and began encouraging his men for a new attack.

Tancred again assaulted the citadel with a siege tower and a force of a Venetian soldier, three of Godfrey's men, and twenty of Tancred's men. Using axes and mattocks trying to breach the large tower. The Fatimids and the Jewish defenders bravely fought them back and used boiling oil and fire flux against the siege tower, which successfully burned it, killing several of the Crusaders. For two days, the Crusaders assaulted once again; although they faced stiff resistance, they finally managed to capture and enter the city. Losing the tower, the defenders ran away. The Crusaders managed to open the gates for the rest to enter.

The Crusader entered the city and began massacring the civilians, including its Jewish community, killing anyone they met. The Venetians returned and engaged in the massacre. Large amounts of spoils, including gold, silver, horses, and much more. The massacre of Haifa effectively destroyed the Jewish community in the city. The Venetians resigned their loot and sailed back home. The city fell on 20 August.

== See also ==
- Venetian expedition to the Levant (1099–1100)

== Sources ==
- M. M. Silver (2021), The History of Galilee, 47 BCE to 1260 CE, From Josephus and Jesus to the Crusades.
- Joshua Prawer (1988), The history of the Jews in the Latin Kingdom of Jerusalem.
- William Barron Stevenson (1907), The Crusaders in the East, A Brief History of the Wars of Islam with the Latins in Syria During the Twelfth and Thirteenth Centuries.
