= Monastery of San Nicolò al Lido =

Church in Venice, Italy

Monastery of Saint Nicholas (San Nicolò al Lido)
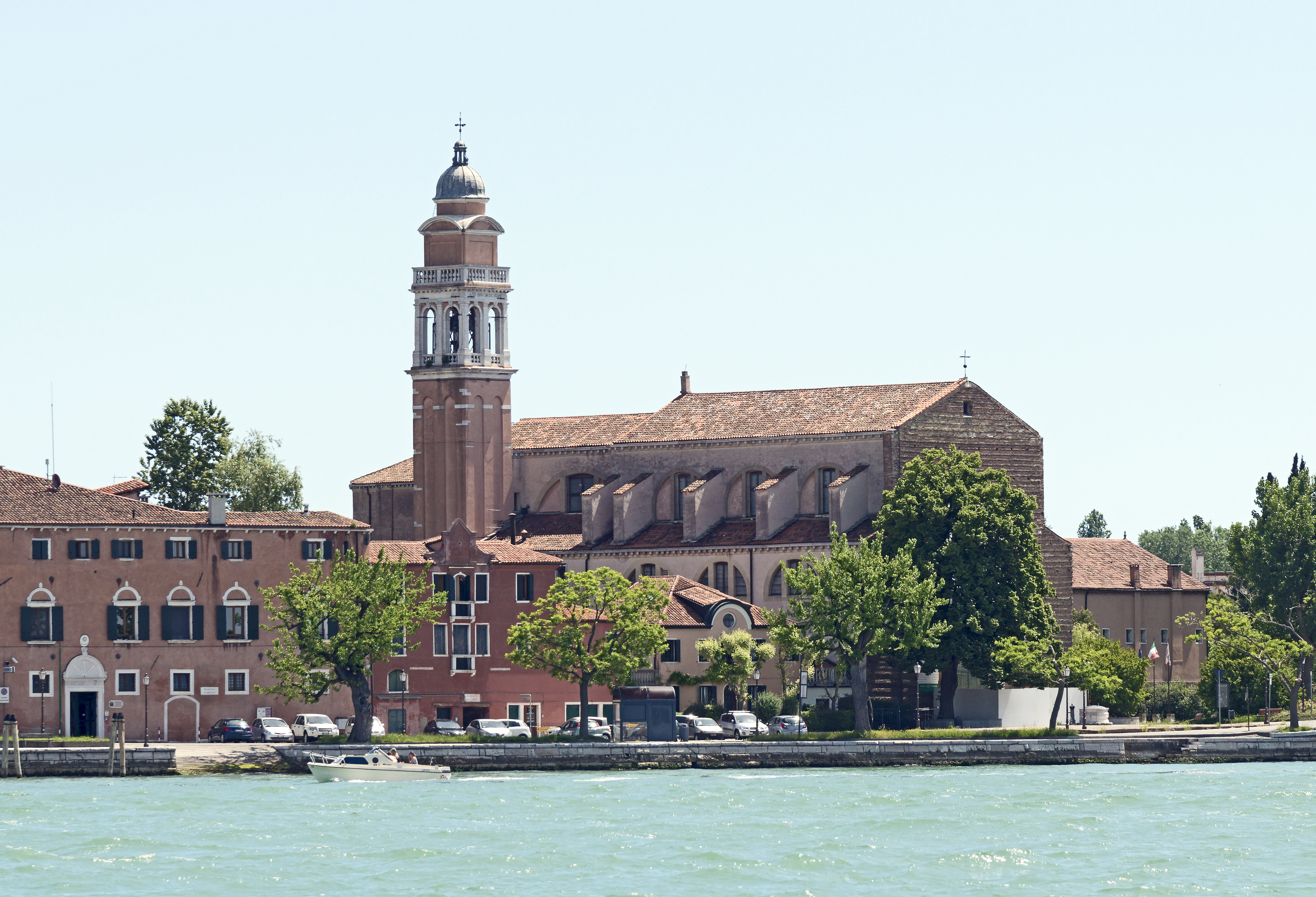
- San Nicolò al Lido

- Location within Italy

Religion
- Affiliation: Roman Catholic
- Province: Venice
- Status: Active

Location
- Location: Riviera San Nicolò 26 30126 Lido di Venezia, Venice, Italy
- Interactive map of Monastery of Saint Nicholas (San Nicolò al Lido)
- Coordinates: 45.427862°N 12.380603°E

Architecture
- Type: Church

San Nicolò al Lido refers to both the San Nicolò Church (Italian: Chiesa / Parrocchia di San Nicolò - San Nicoletto) and most importantly to its annexed Monastery of San Nicolò (Italian: Abbazia di San Nicolò) located in Venice, northern Italy. The two Catholic institutions are located in the northern part of the Lido di Venezia and house the relics of Saint Nicholas, patron of sailors (shared with Bari). From this church, the traditional thanksgiving Mass of the Sposalizio del Mare ("Marriage of the Sea") is celebrated. The complex houses monks of the Franciscan order.

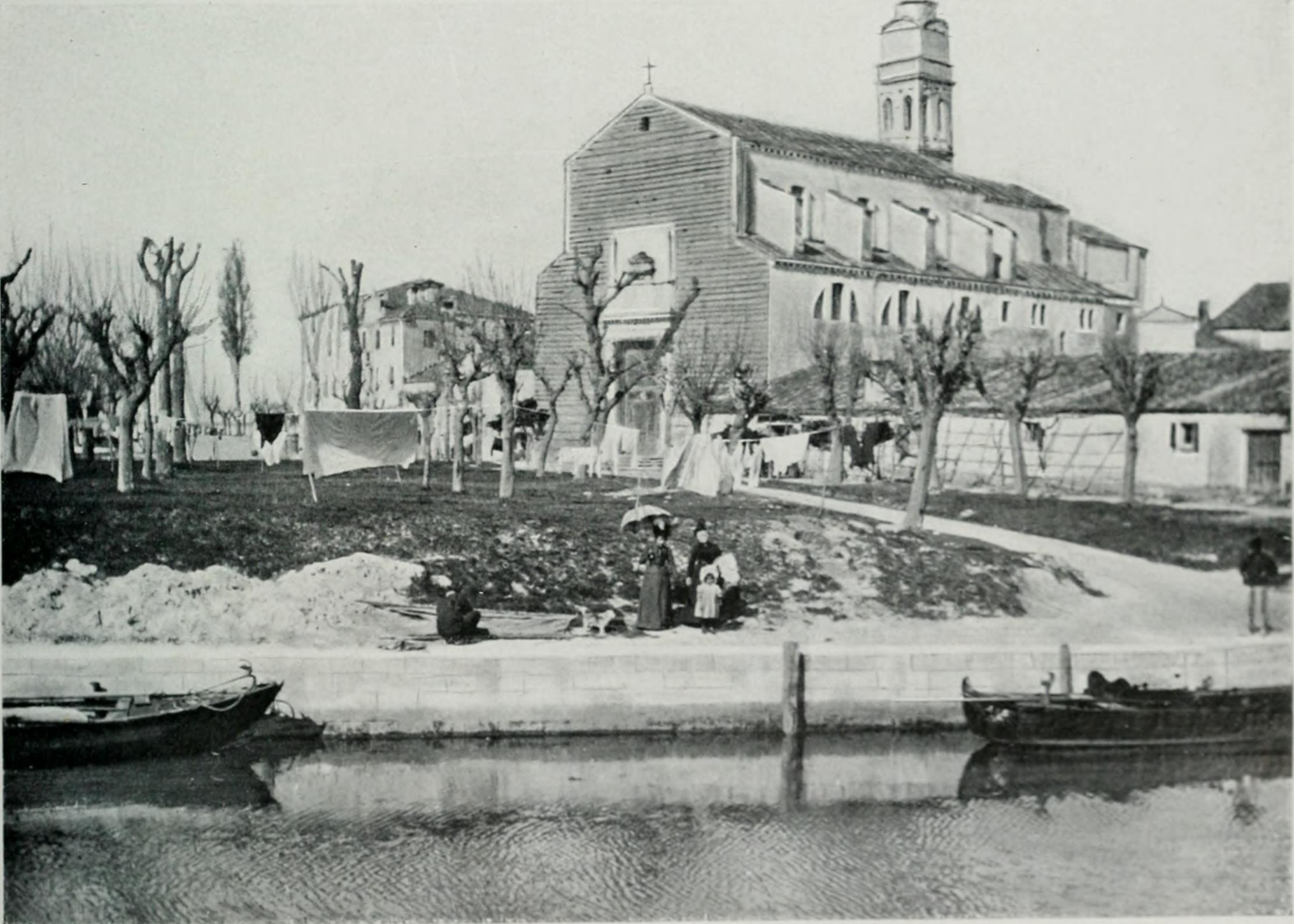
San Nicolò (1904)

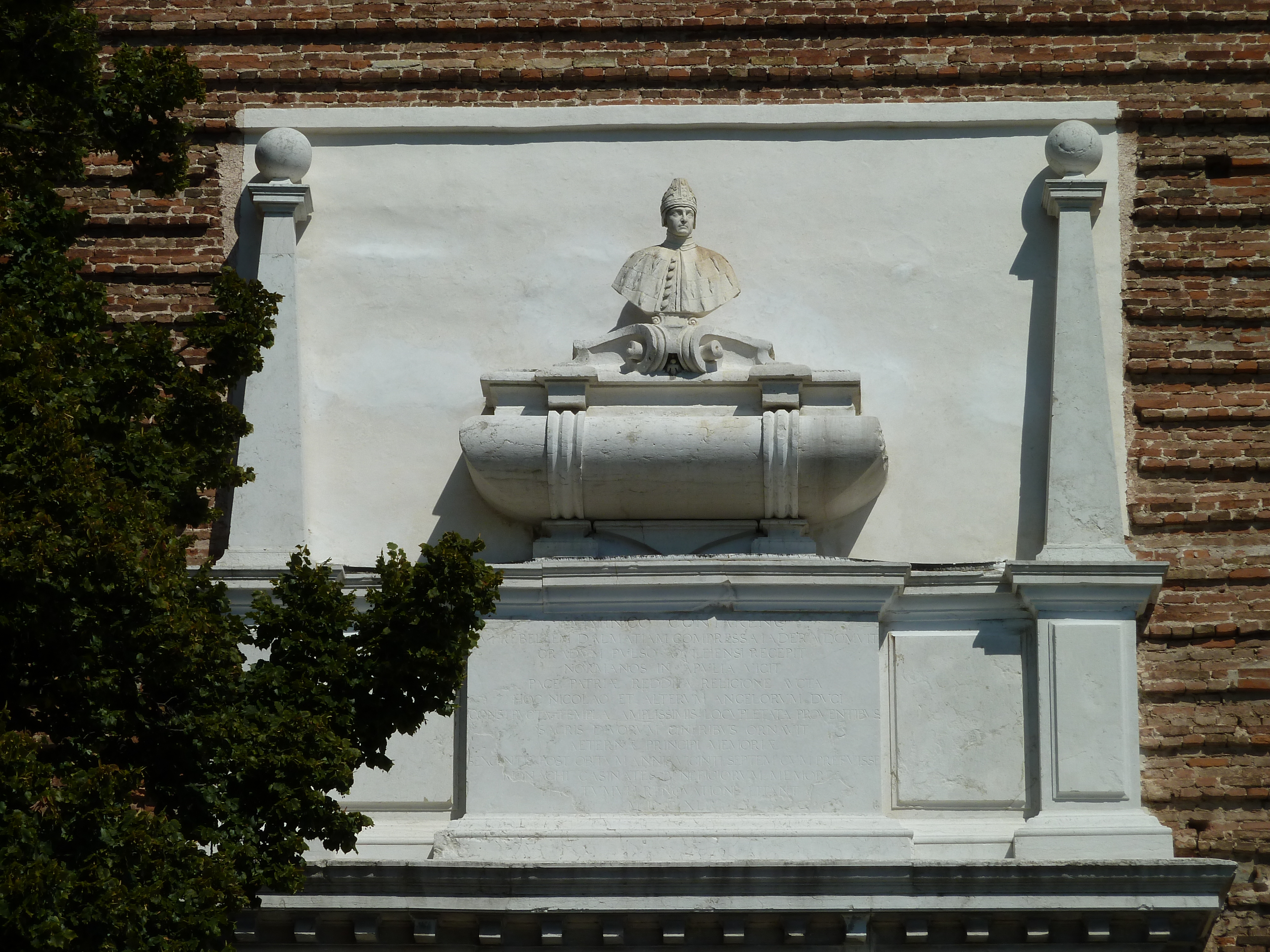
Entrance Portal

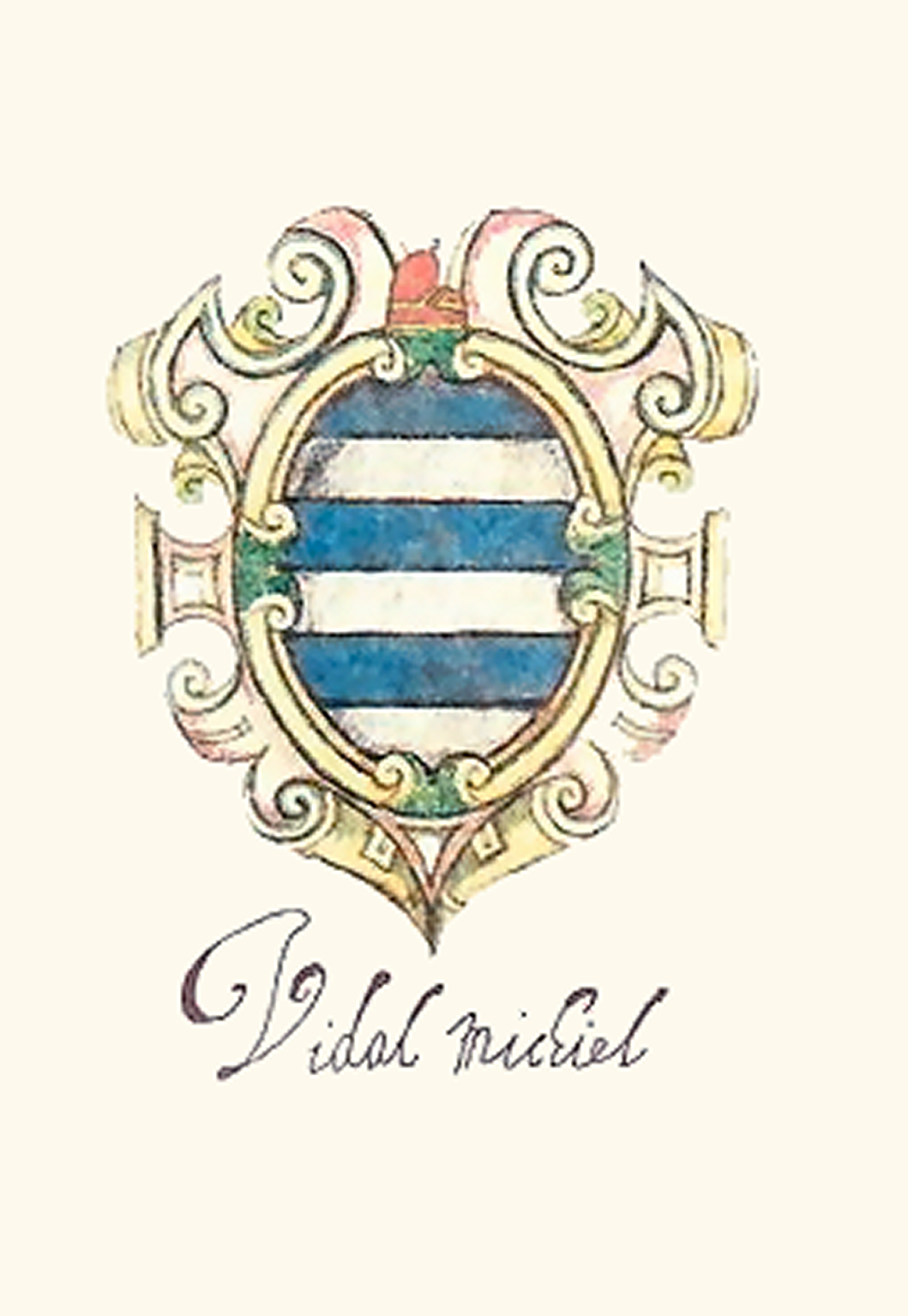
Coat-of-arms: Vital I Michiel

== History ==
The convent and the church date to the origins of Venice in the early Middle Ages, founded, according to a legend, by the Zancaruol family. The site stood at a strategic point for the nascent Venetian power: at the main access to the sea. From here, in 996 and 998, sailed off the first Venetian expeditions against the Narentine pirates. On 9 May 1000, the fleet led by Doge Pietro Orseolo II took off for the campaign that led to the submission of Dalmatia. This event is still remembered in the Marriage of the Sea ceremony. In this church, Doge Domenico Selvo was elected and crowned in 1071, since St Mark's Basilica was under reconstruction. In 1099, the Venetian participation in the First Crusade departed from this port, led by the Bishop of Castello and Giovanni, son of the doge Vital I Michiel. In 1100, the putative relics of the body of Saint Nicholas were stolen from Myra in Lycia, and interred in this church. However, a few years earlier, in 1089, the remains of the saint had been entombed in Bari by Pope Urban II in person. Nicholas was proclaimed protector of the Venetian fleet. In 1202, the forces of the Fourth Crusade left from here. In 1245 Salinguerra II Torelli was buried here; he was a Ghibelline nobleman who held the city of Ferrara for many years, and who disputed the primacy of the Este family. In 1623 the relics of Saint Nicholas were transferred from the church to the monastery to accommodate the construction of the new building, before being placed back below the altar. The Monastery was founded in the 11th century and transformed into a Renaissance cloister in the 16th century. After the suppression of the Benedictine order in 1770, the monastery was re-opened by Franciscan monks for educational purposes.

== Architecture ==
The church, with a single nave, is annexed to a monastery (convent) and a great cloister, all dating to the 16th century. The Baroque campanile was erected in 1626–1629. The façade is surmounted by the tomb of Doge Domenico Contarini, who patronized the convent. The interior houses works are by Palma il Vecchio (Madonna with Child) and Palma il Giovane (San Giovannino). The three bells in G major date back to the 16th century.

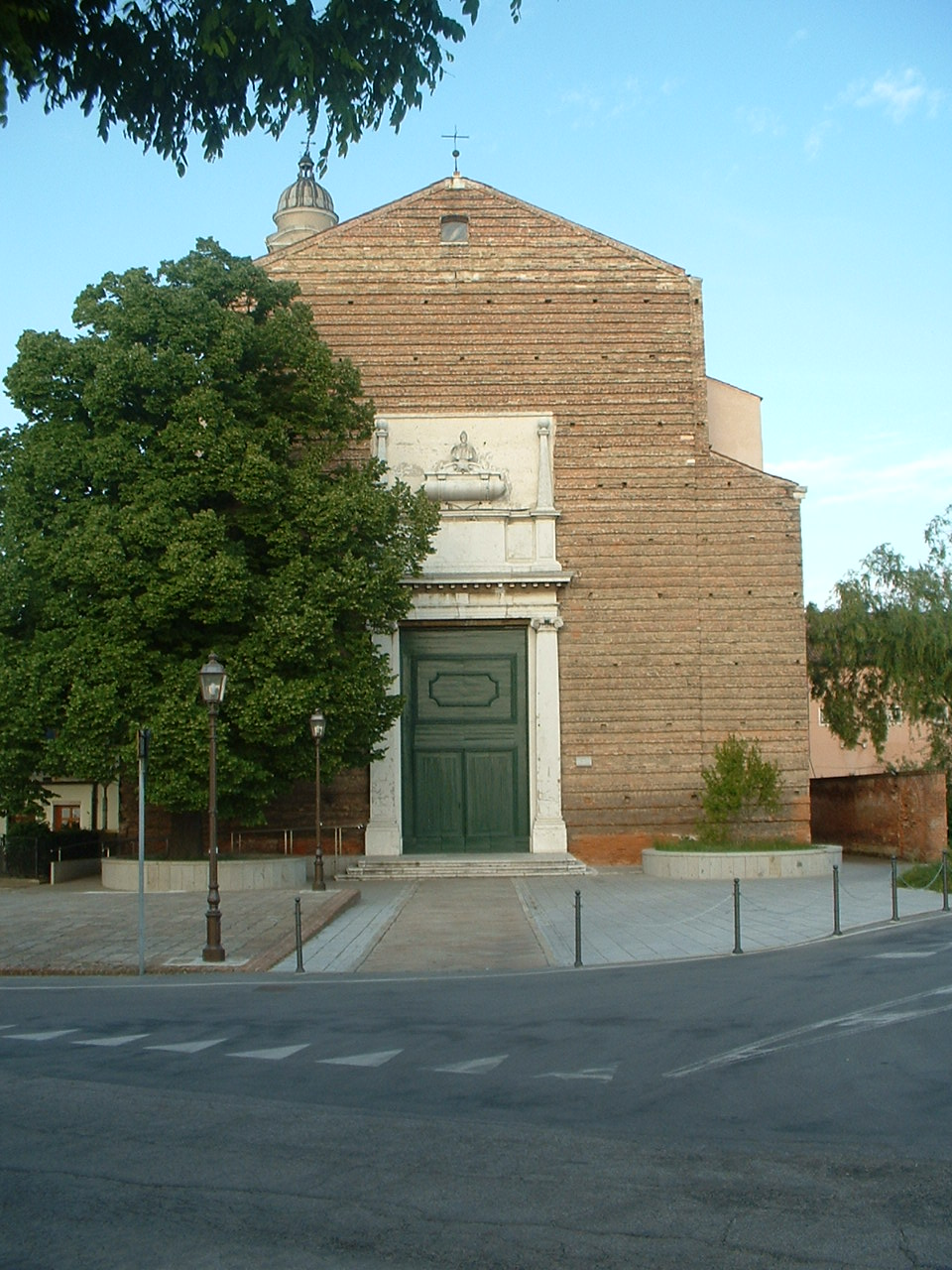

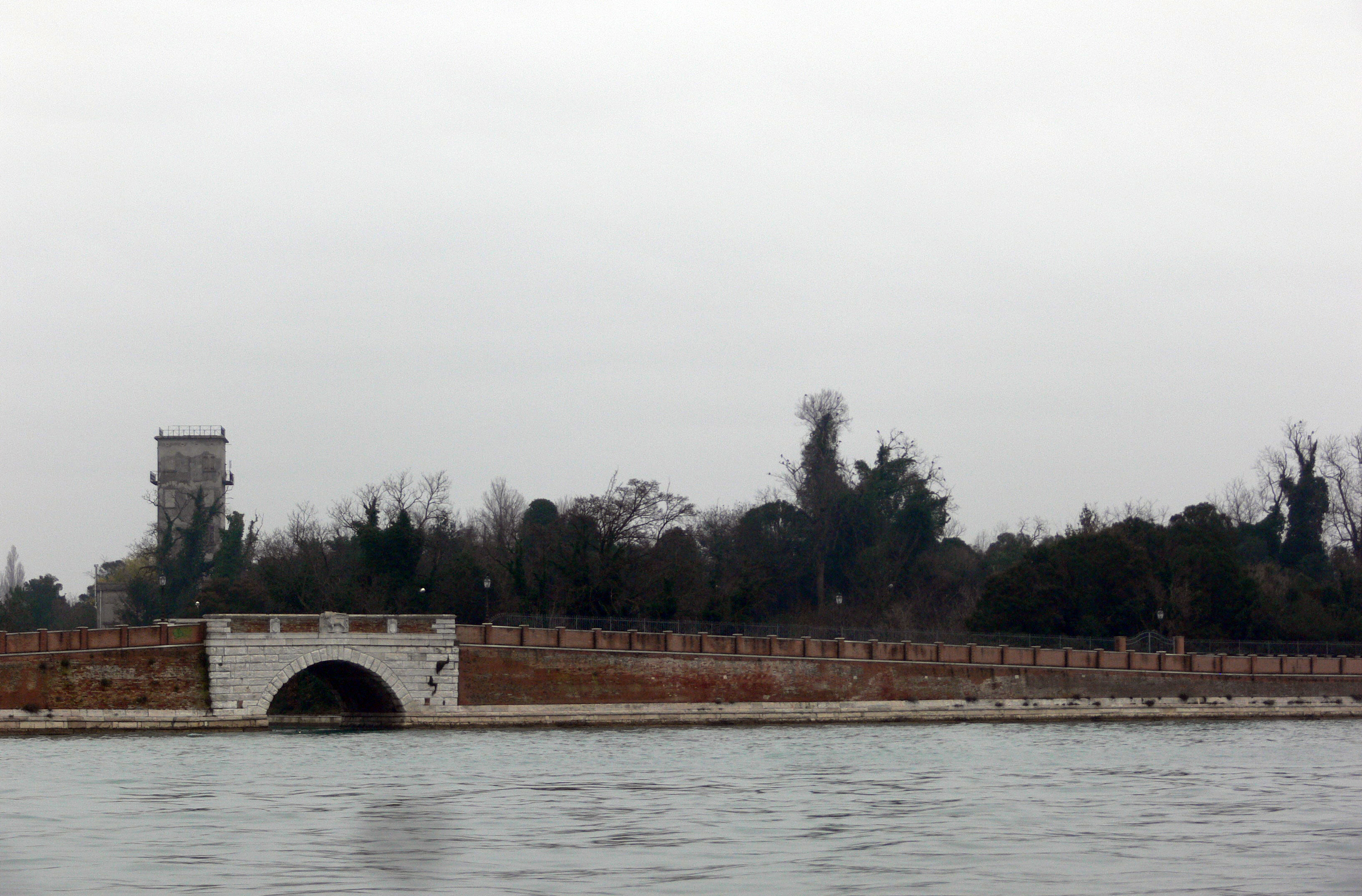
San Nicolò Fortress

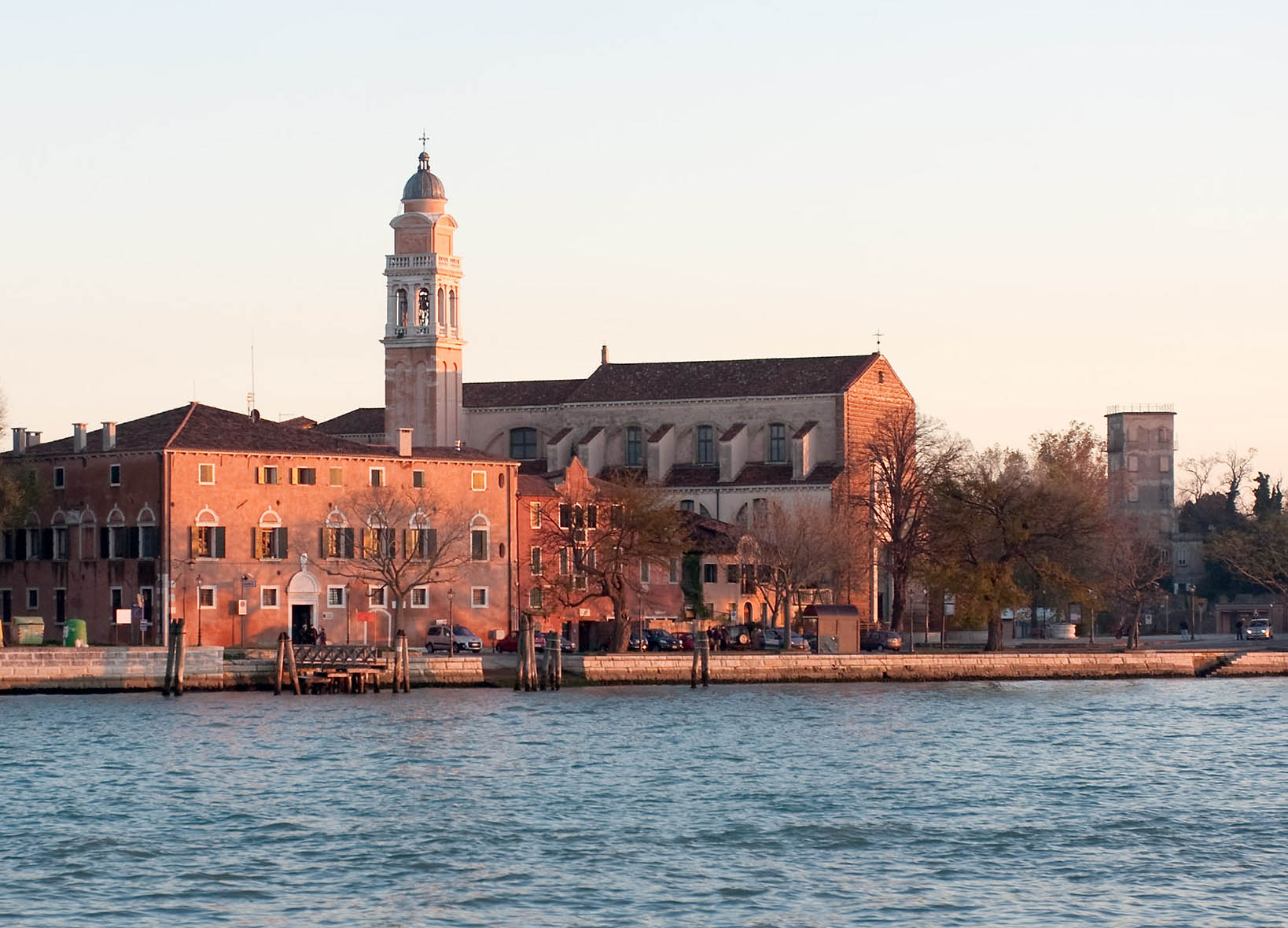

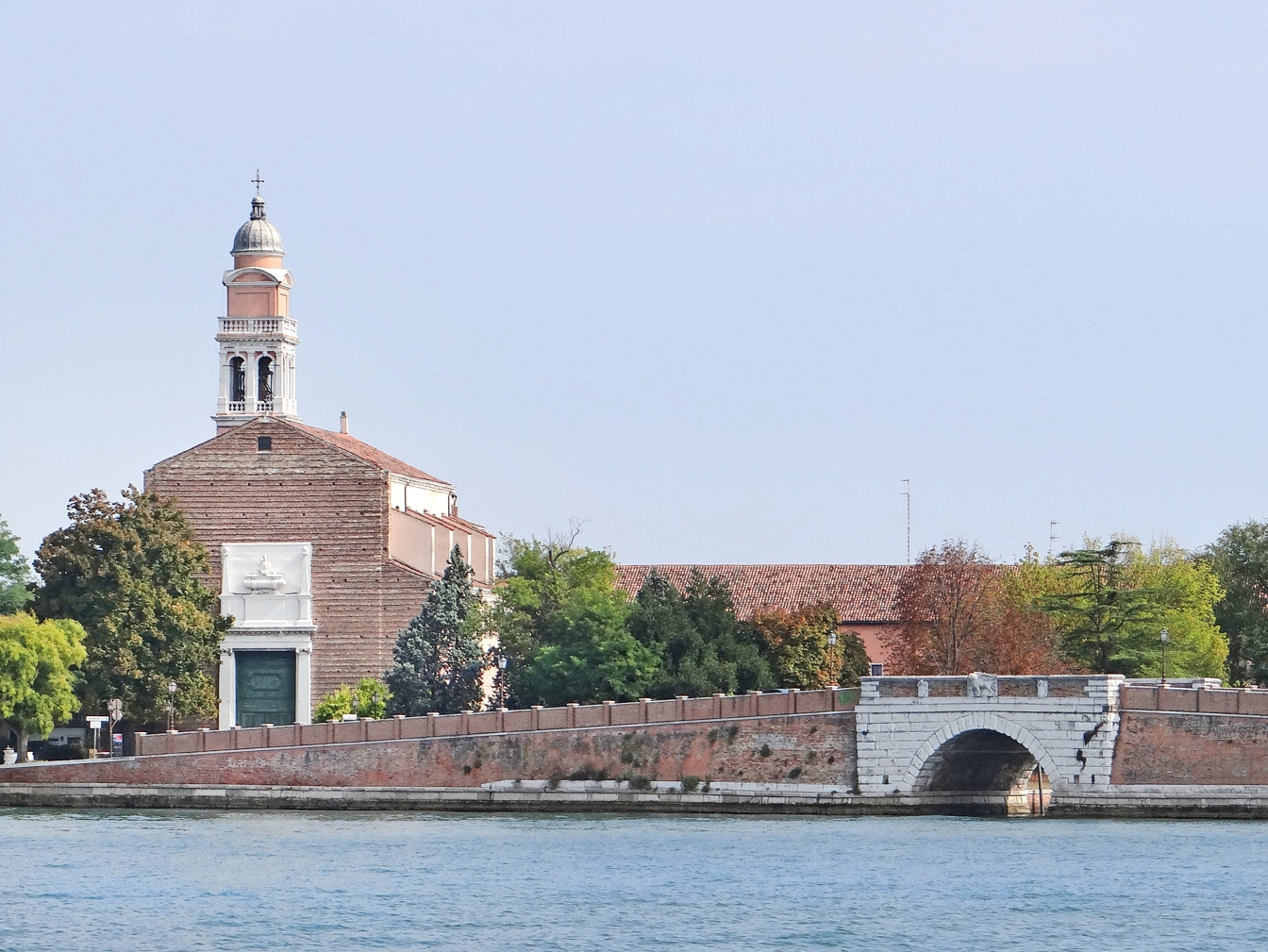

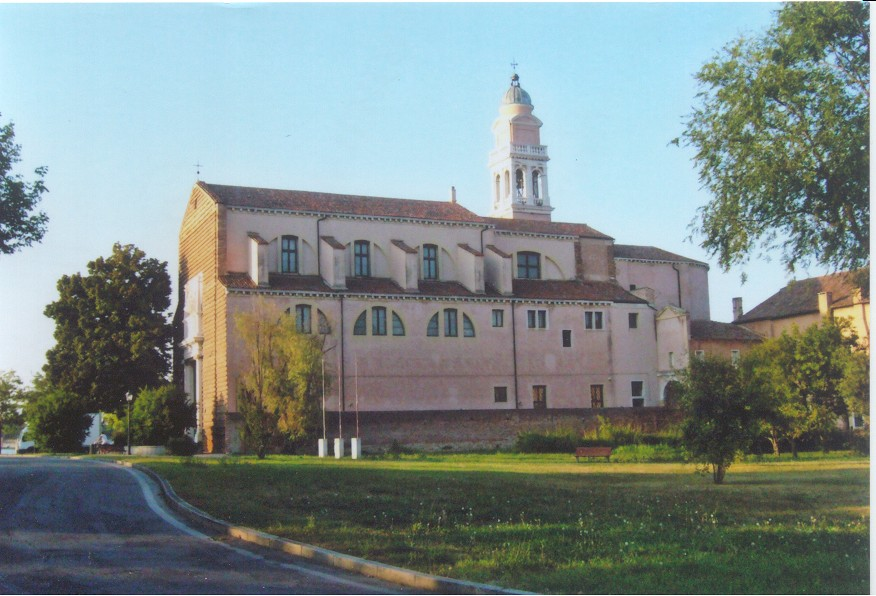

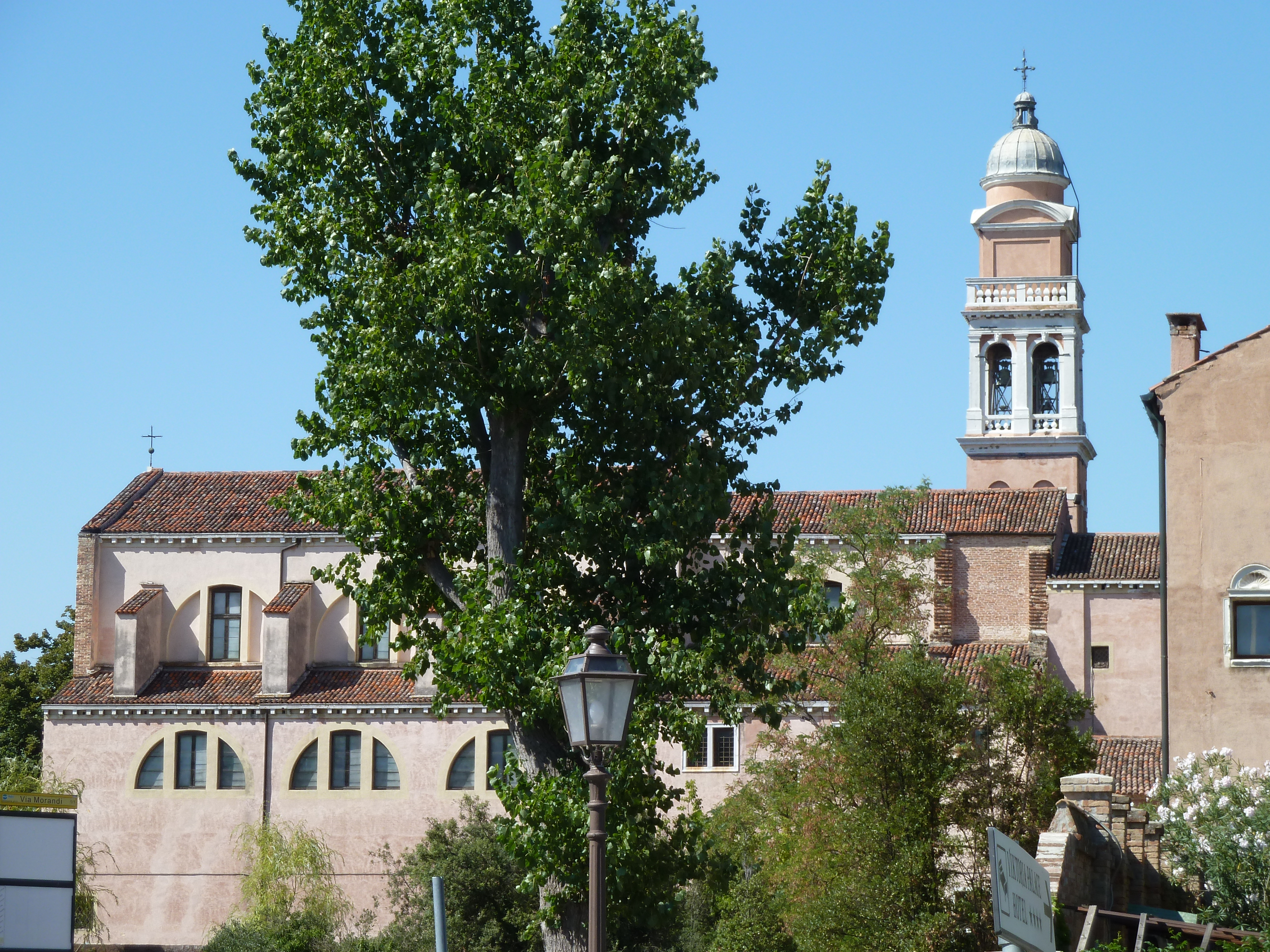

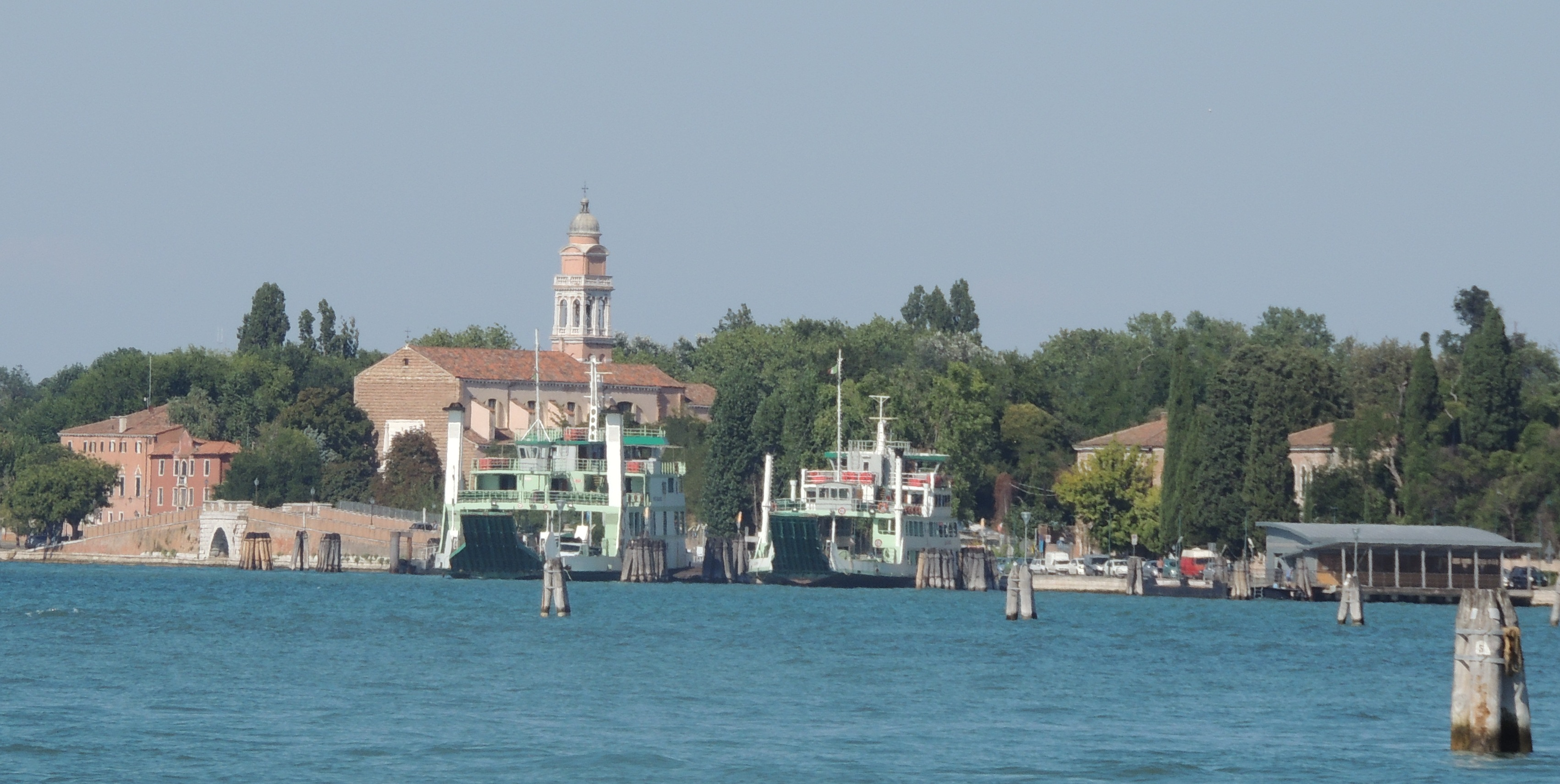

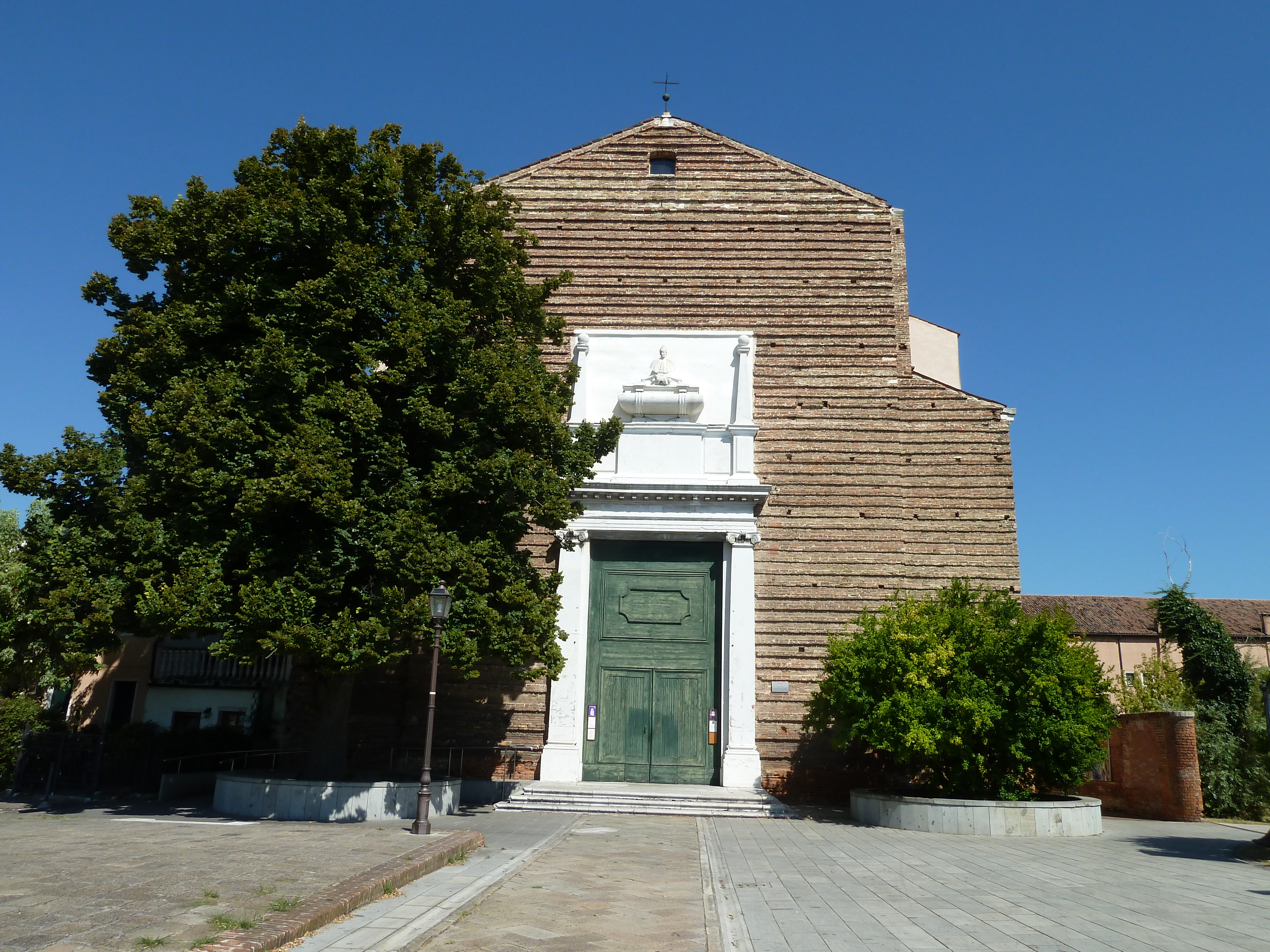

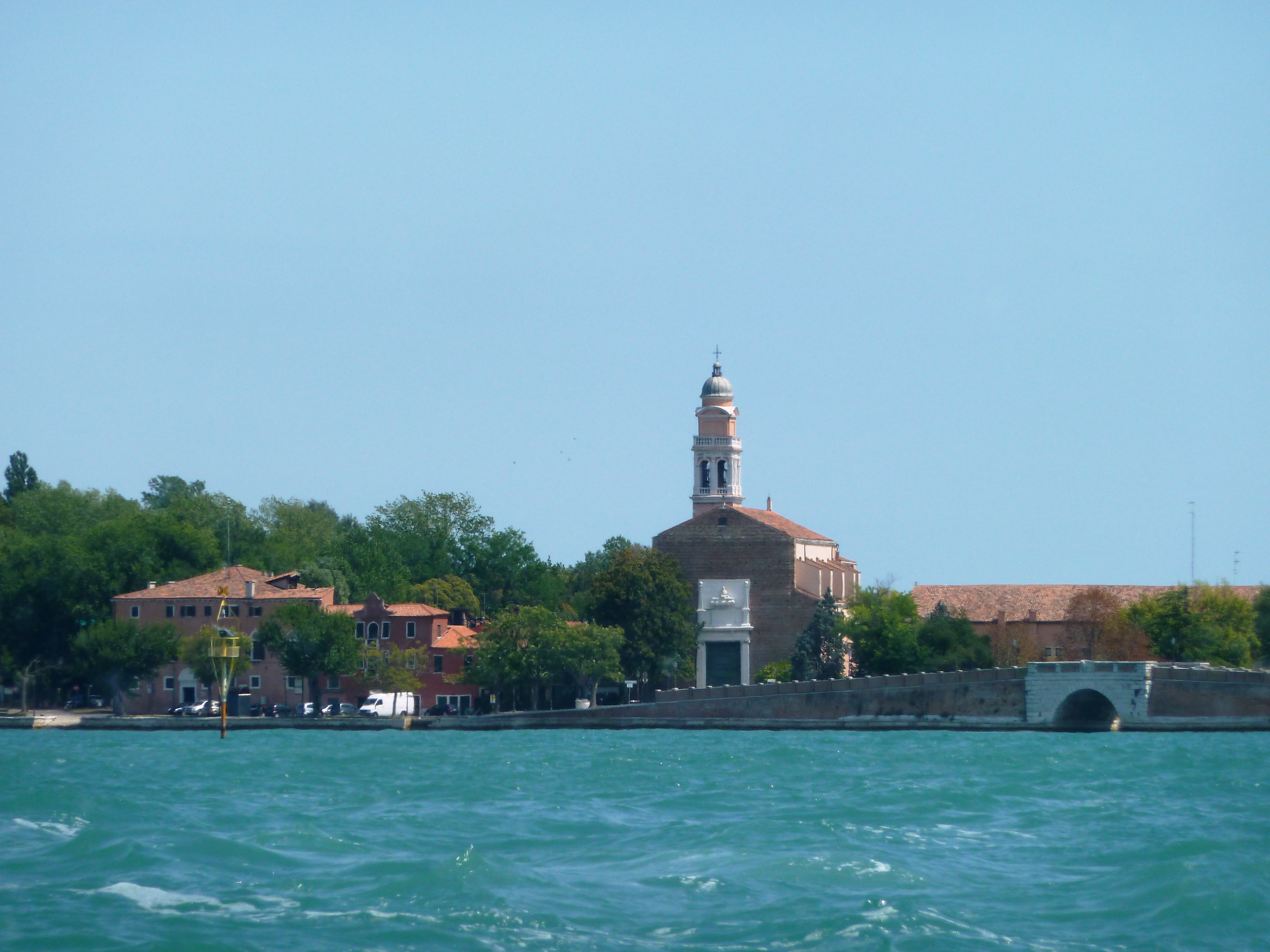

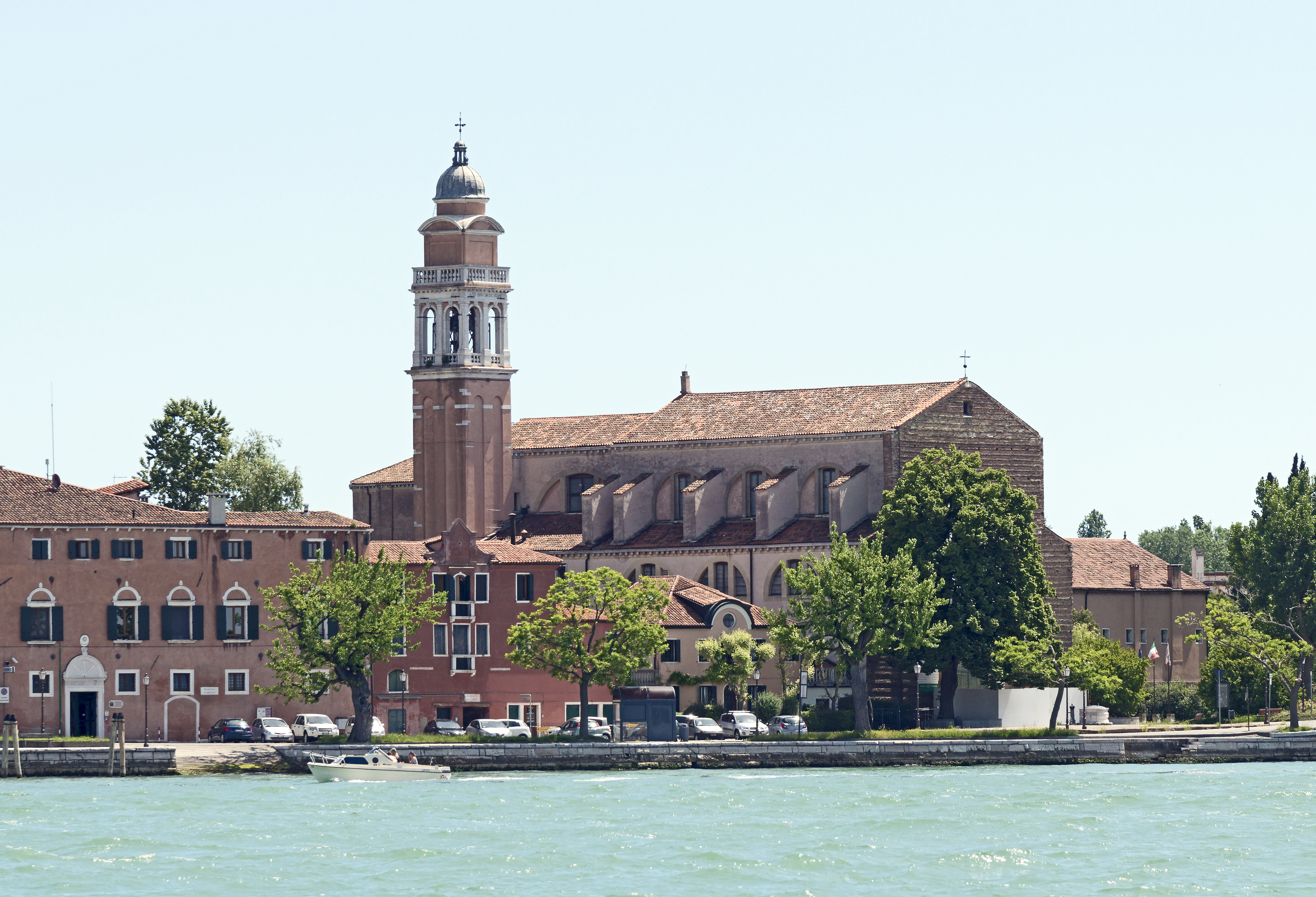

== In art ==
Italian painter Francesco Guardi (October 5, 1712 – January 1, 1793), member of the classic Venetian School of Painting, is one of the most pivotal figures regarding the visual documentation of San Nicolò through his numerous works. His painting style, known as pittura di tocco (of touch) due to its small dotting and spirited brush-strokes, was later highly prized by the French Impressionists.

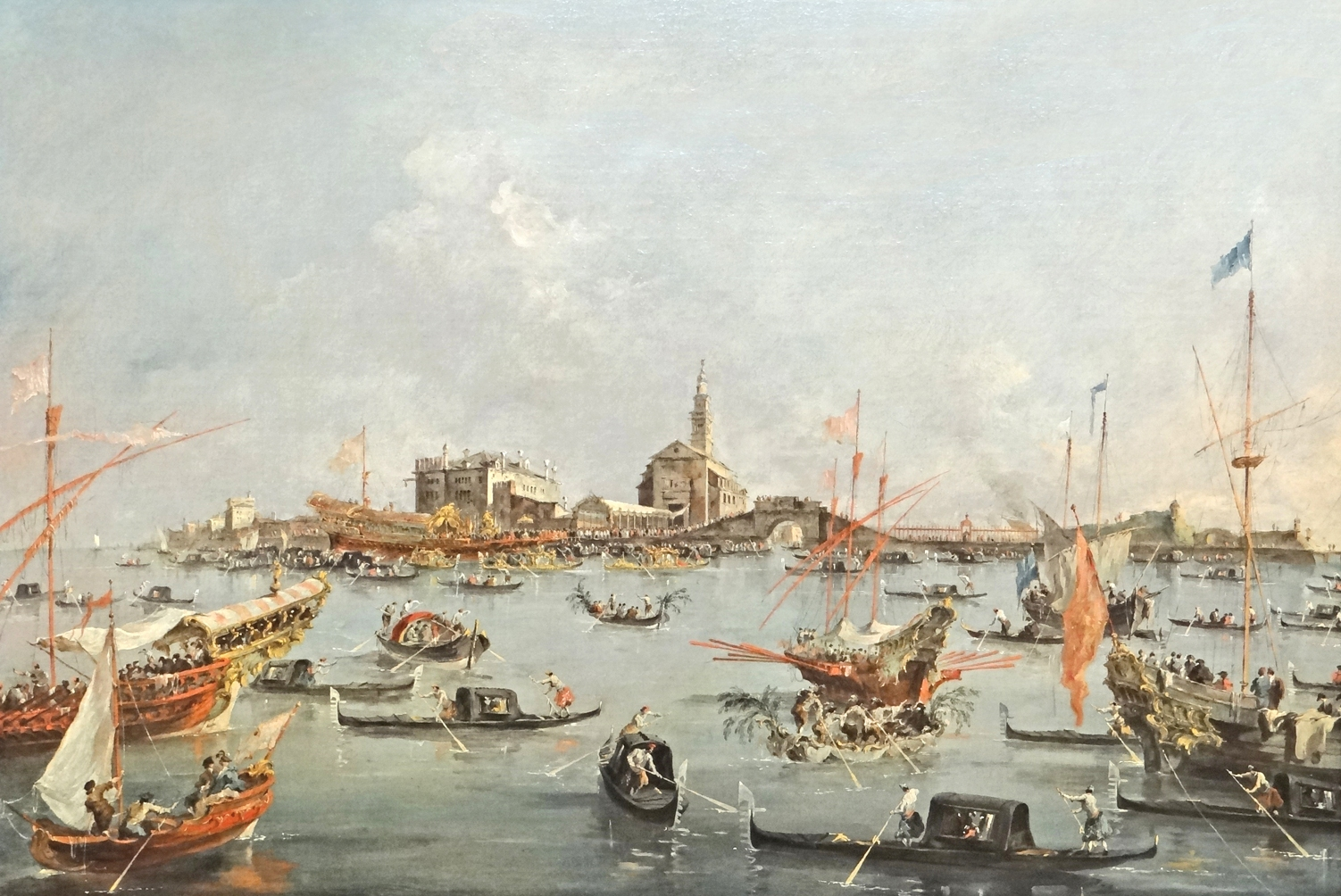
'Doge of Venice on the Bucintoro', San Nicolo du Lido during the Marriage of the Sea (c.1775-1780) by Francesco Guardi (1712-1793).

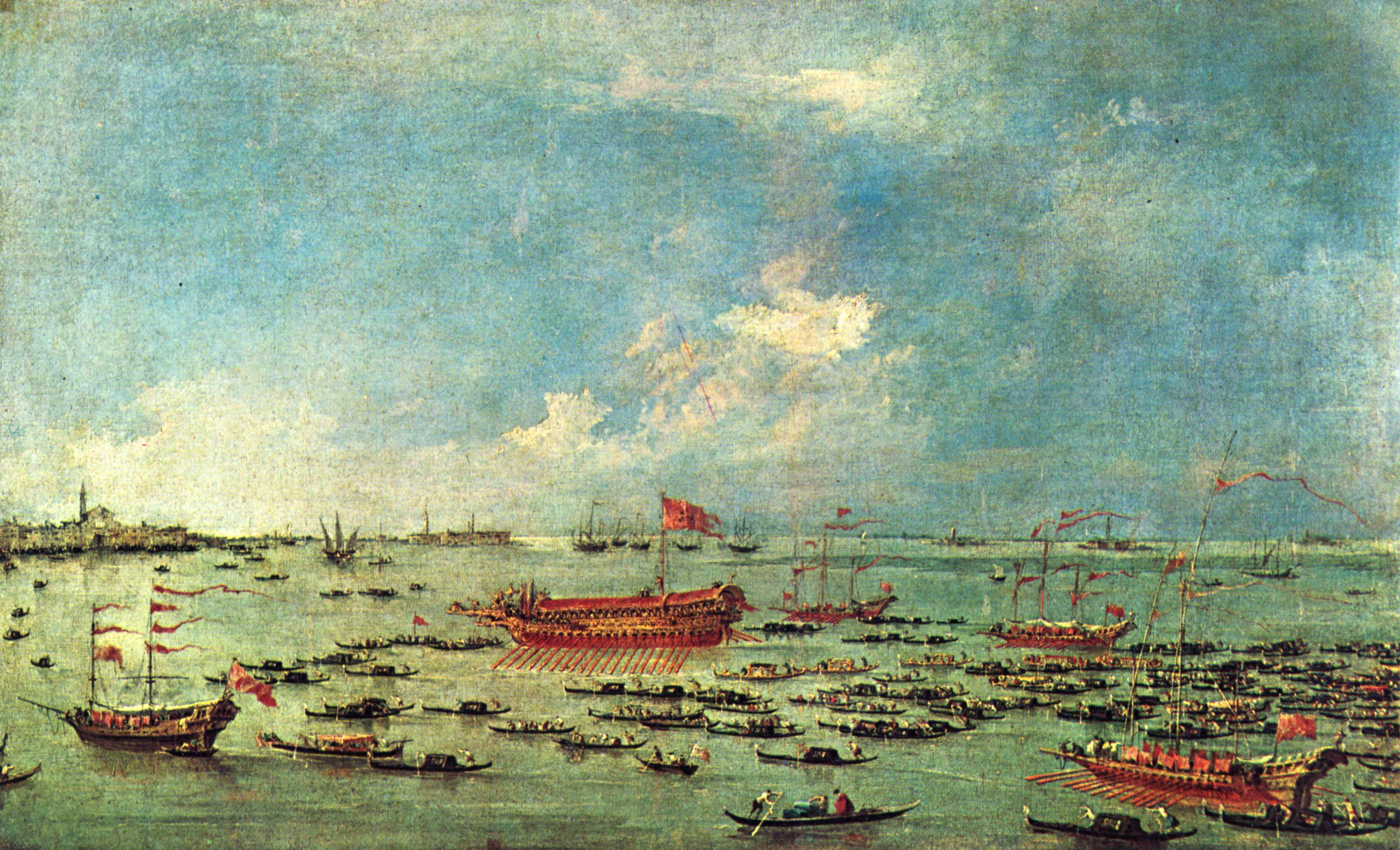
The Bucintoro near San Nicolò di Lido (c. 1780–1790) by Francesco Guardi (1712–1793).

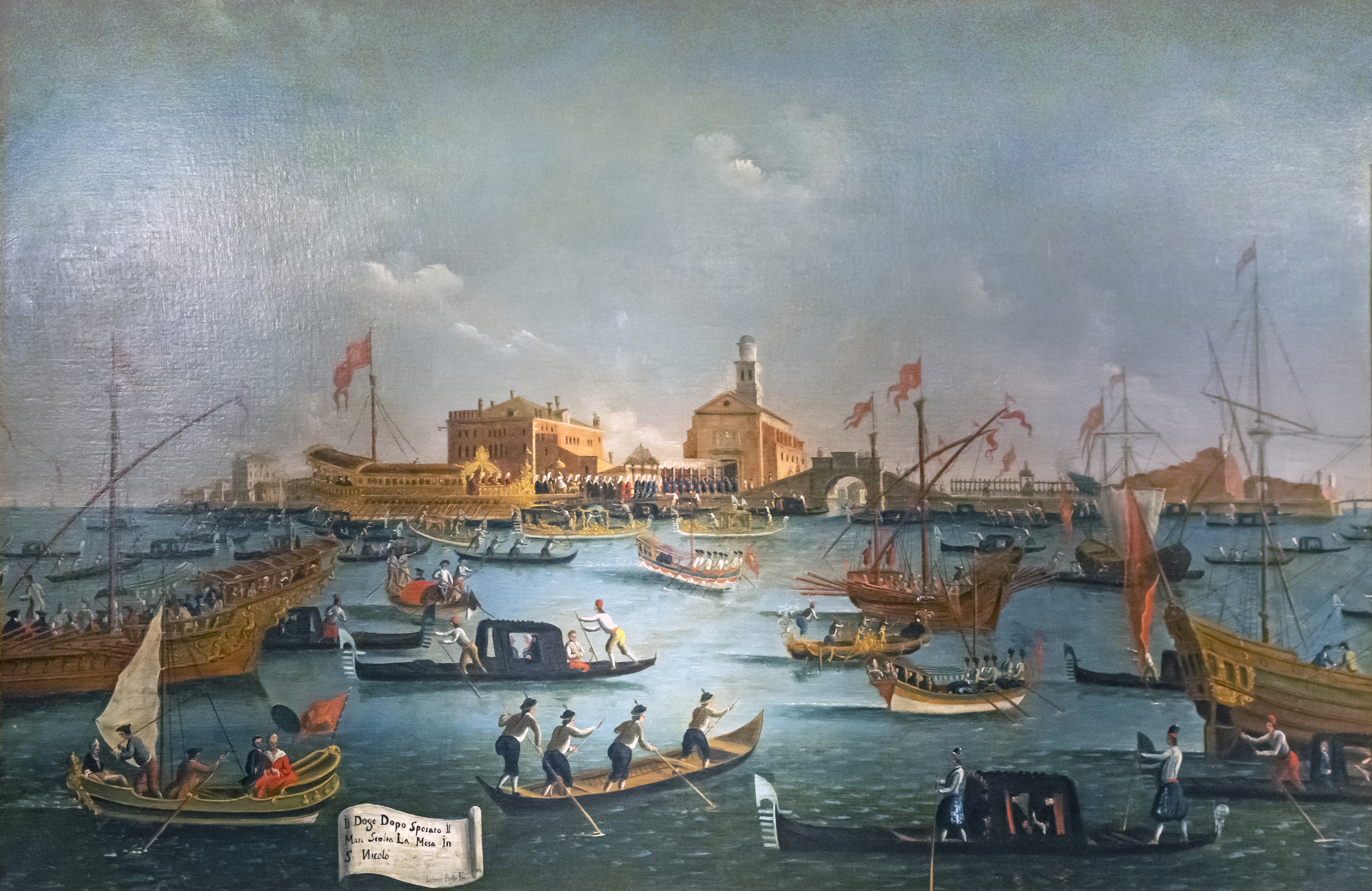
Gabriele Bella (il doge di venezia sul bucintoro a san niccolò)

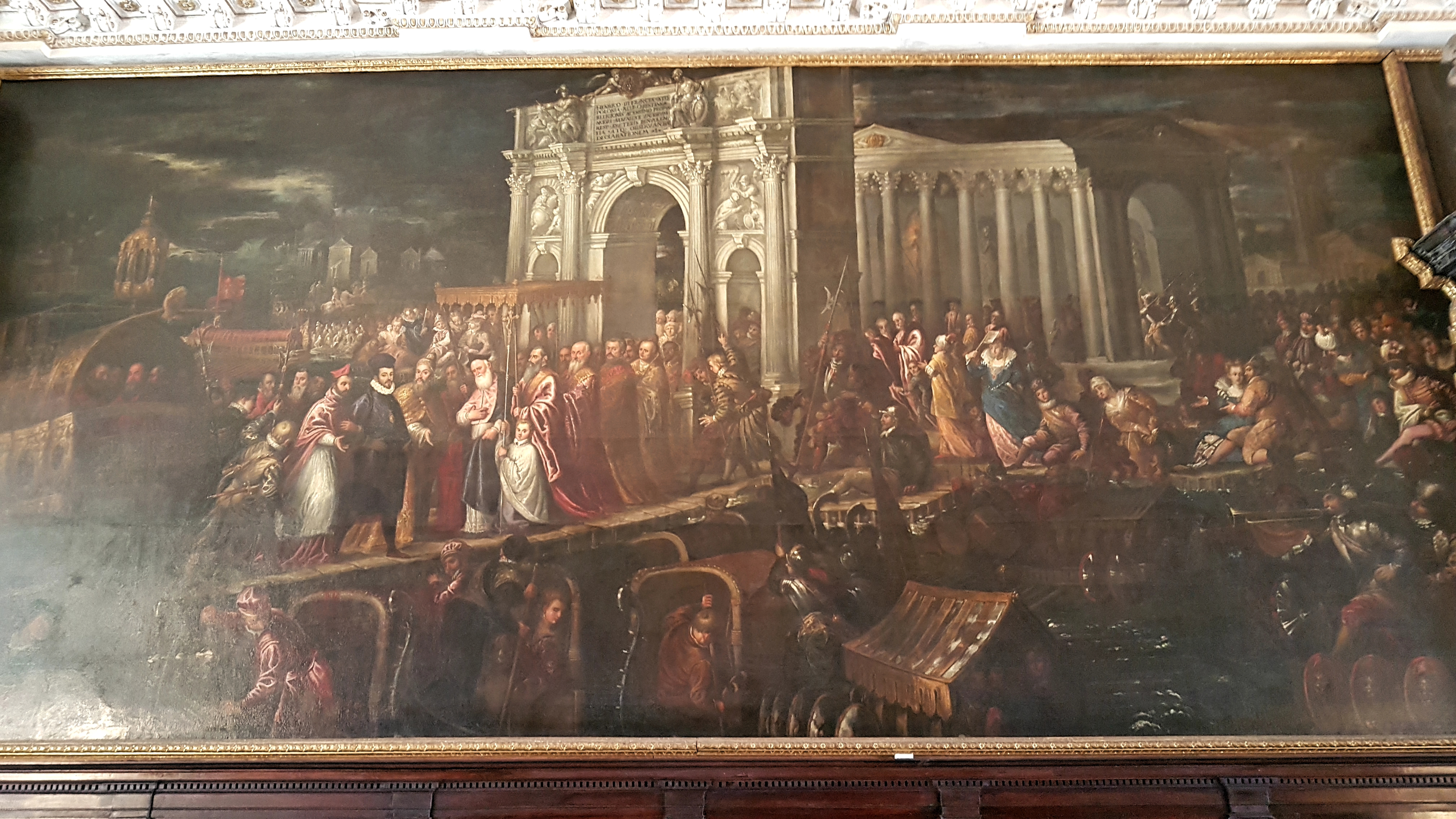
'Dogen und vom Patriachen in San Nicolo del Lido' by Andrea Vicentino.

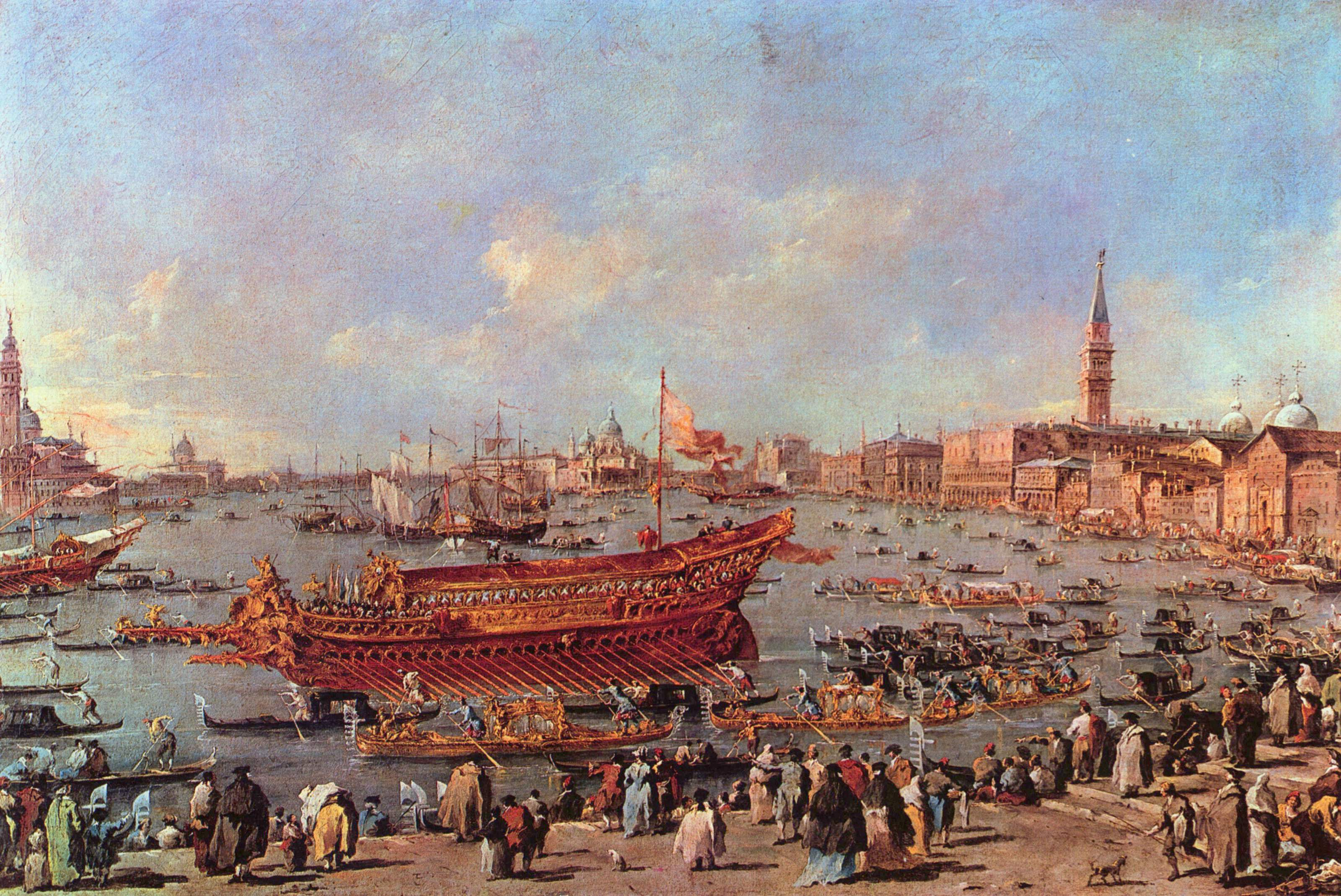
Francesco Guardi - The Departure of Bucentaur for the Lido on Ascension Day

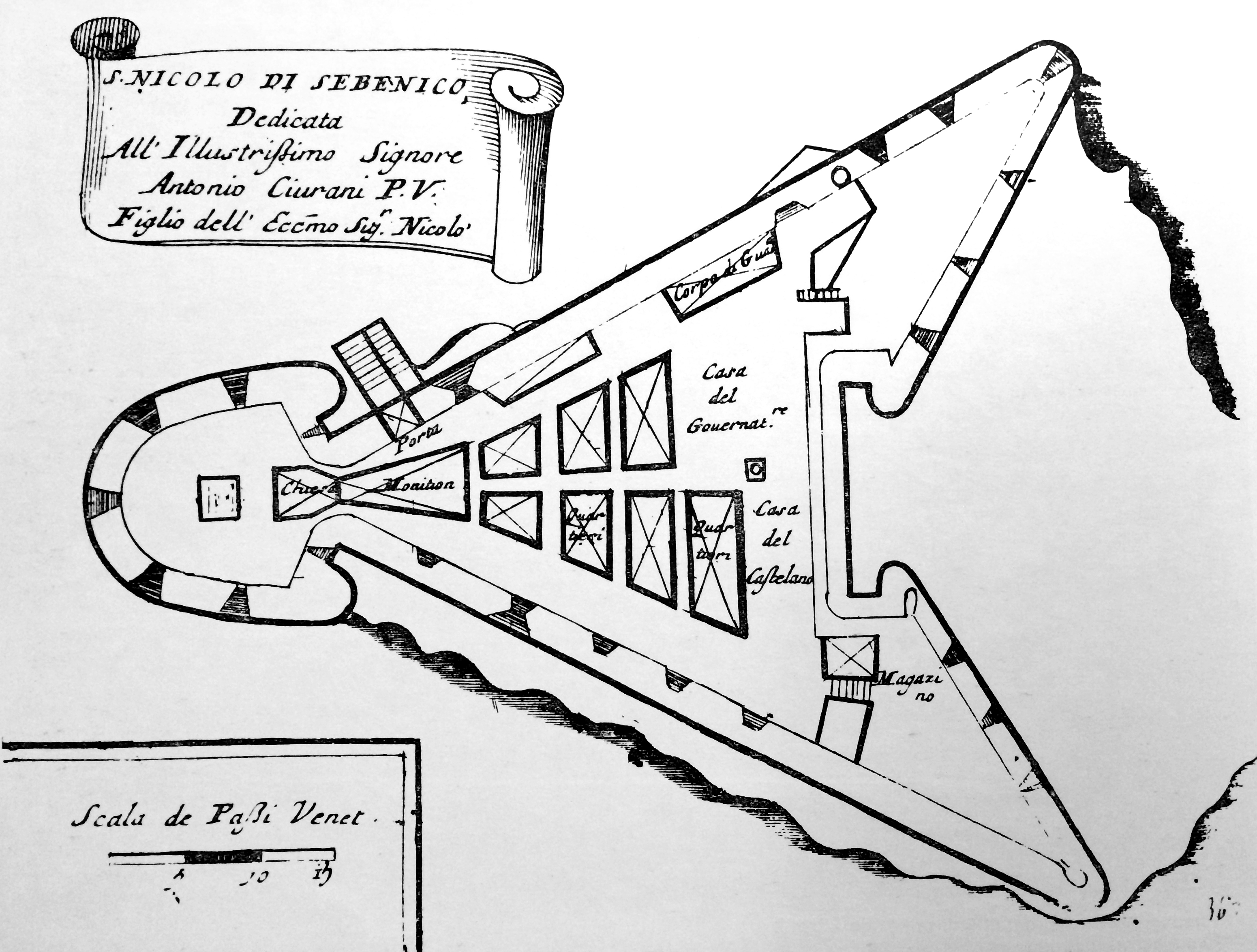
Vincenzo Coronelli - S. Nicolò.

== Fortress of San Niccolò ==
As of January 2019, the Fortress of San Niccolo (Fortress of the Islands of the Lagoon) is a non-visitable military zone. It was Built by the city of Venice in 1591, refurbished by the French in 1806, modified by the Austrians in 1831, and integrated into a "ridotto" (redoubt) in 1856.

== The relics of Nicholas ==
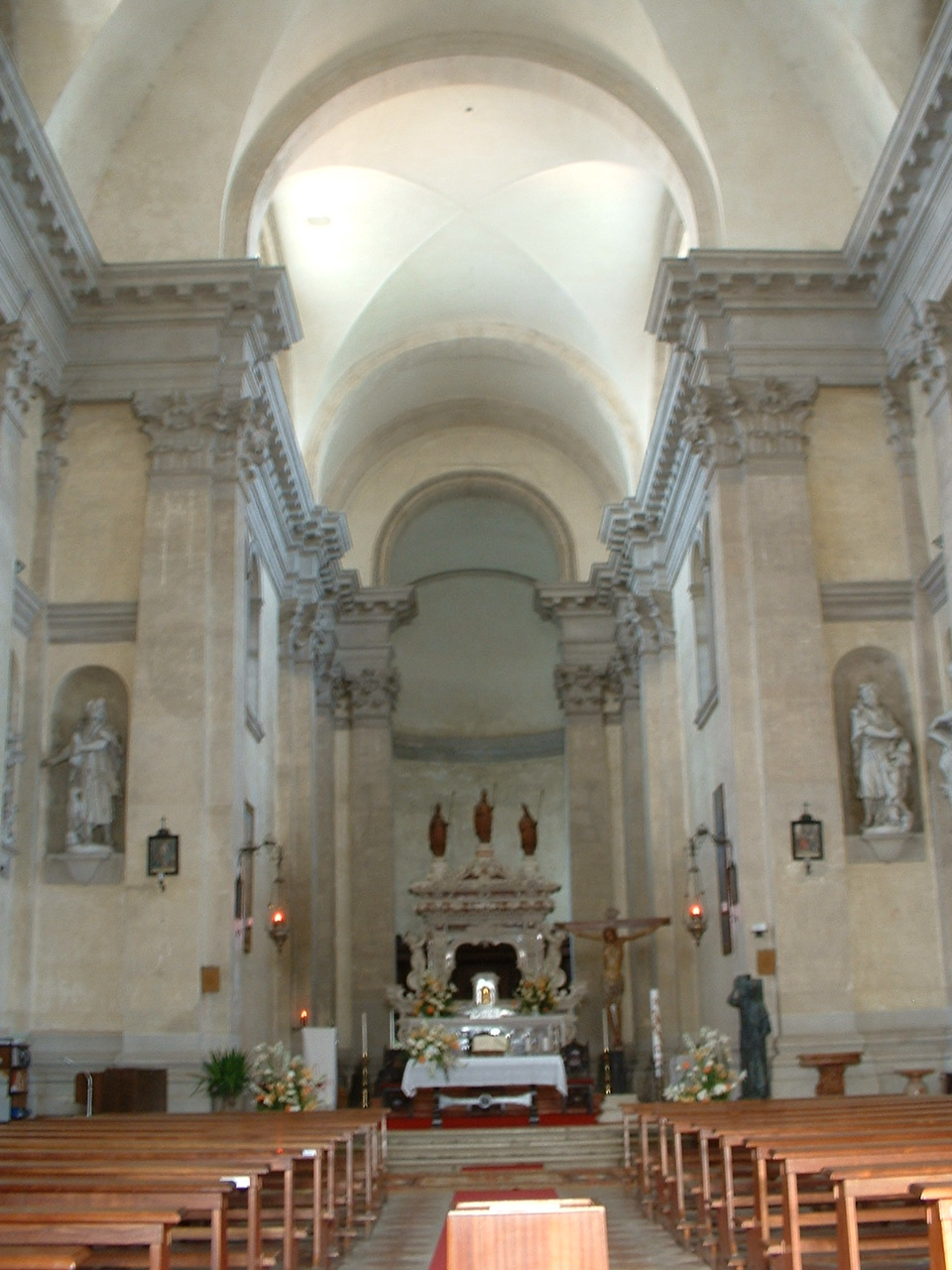
Interior of San Nicolò al Lido.

The possession of the relics of Saint Nicholas has long been disputed between Venice and Bari. In recent times some scientific inspections of the bones have been held, in Bari in 1953 (the first ever made) and in Venice (1992). Analyses found that the relics, divided between the two cities, belong to the same person: Bari has the larger bone fragments, while Venice has the smaller fragments, forgotten by Bari's sailor-men. The presence of the relics in Venice is little known, so the church is not a place of pilgrimage like Bari, especially for Russian Orthodox.

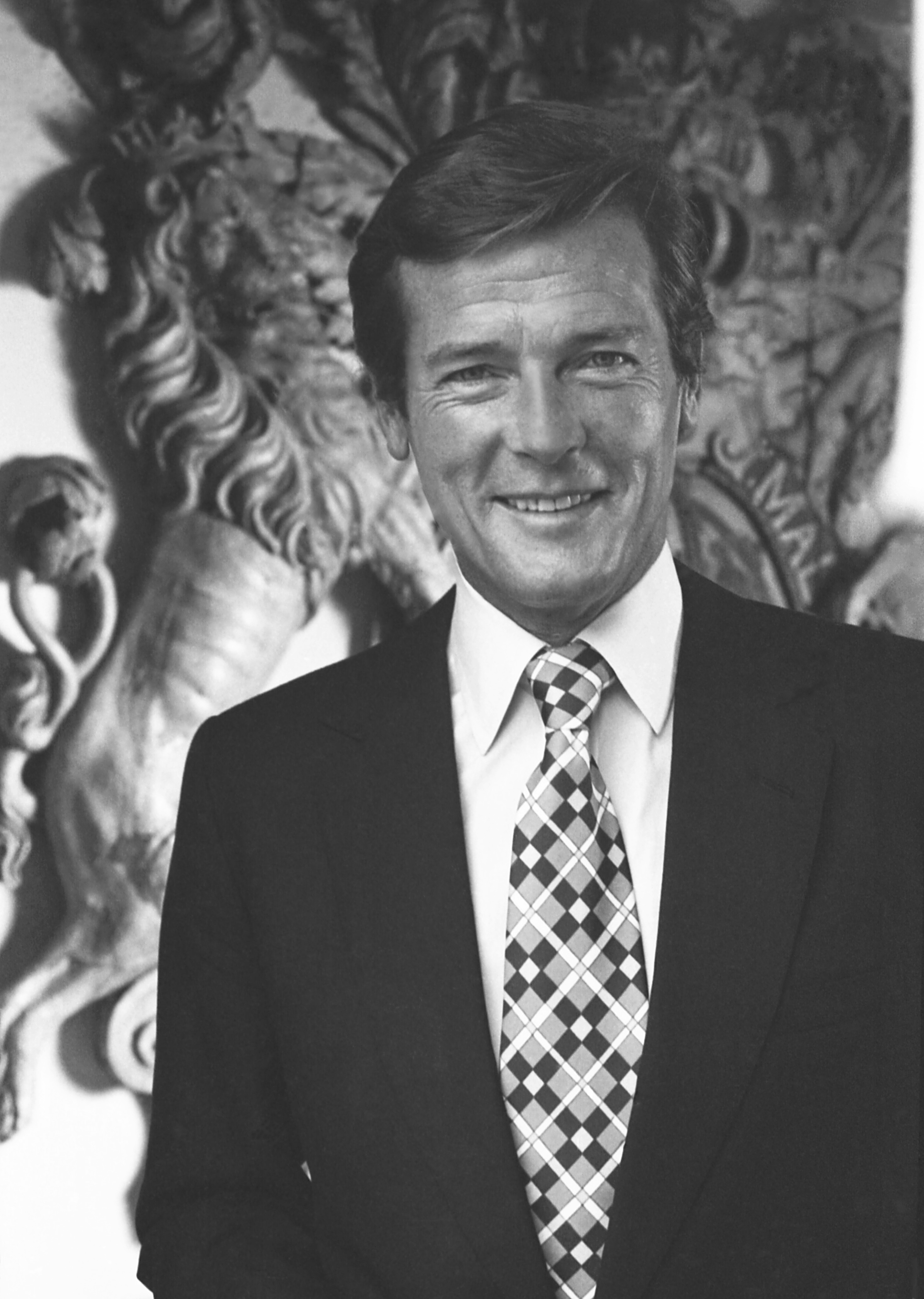
Roger Moore

== Film and television ==
San Nicolò plays a pivotal place as a filming location as it hosted the production of the 1971 Italian-French drama film Death in Venice (original Italian title: Morte a Venezia) directed by Luchino Visconti and starring Dirk Bogarde and Björn Andrésen, based on the eponymous novella by German author Thomas Mann. With regards to the James Bond film series, San Nicolò has welcomed the crew of Martin Campbell’s Casino Royale (2006) starring Daniel Craig and Eva Green but also was used as the Italian headquarters of MI6 in Lewis Gilbert’s Moonraker (1979) starring Roger Moore for which production began on 14 August 1978. It was adapted from Ian Fleming’s eponymous novel (1954). However, the 'Venetian glass museum' and 'fight between Bond and Chang' (Drax's original bodyguard played by Toshiro Suga) was shot at Boulogne Studios in a building which had once been a World War II Luftwaffe aircraft factory during Germany's occupation of France. The scene in the Venice glass museum and warehouse holds the record for the largest amount of break-away sugar glass used in a single scene.

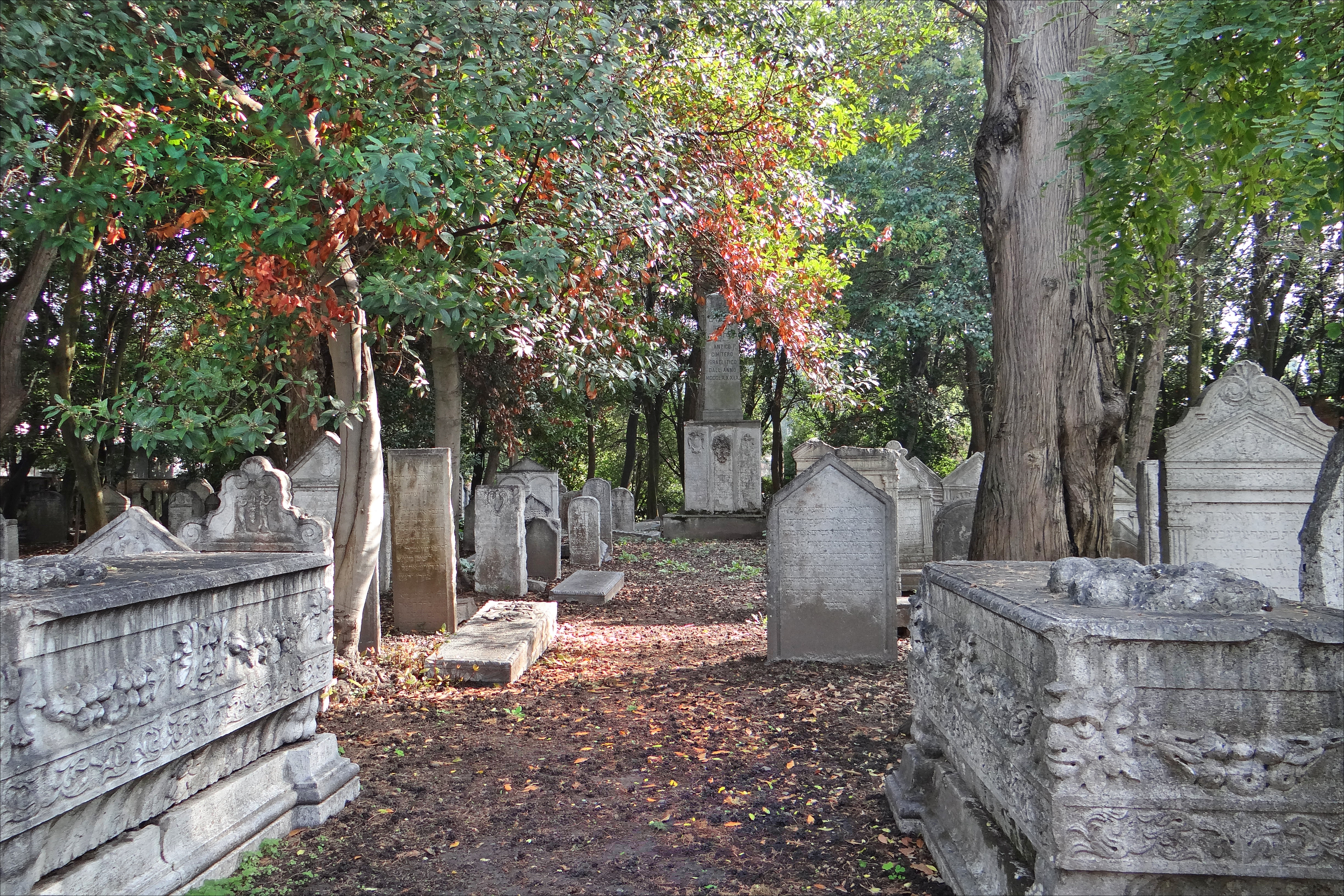
Old Jewish Cemetery

== Jewish Cemetery ==
The Old Jewish Cemetery (Italian: Il vecchio cimitero ebraico) is located a few meters away from San Nicolò. The first graves of this cemetery trace back to 1386 at a time when the Jews of Venice were not yet obliged to live in the ghetto created in 1516. The cemetery was used until the years 1640-1650 and it was abandoned because of the extension of the fortifications of San Nicolo made necessary by the Turkish threat.

== Venice-Lido Airport ==
Venice-Lido Airport (Italian: Aeroporto di Venezia-Lido, ICAO: LIPV) is an aerodrome located right by the Monastery. It is also known as Giovanni Nicelli Airport and was formerly known as Venice-San Nicolò Airport.

== Bibliography ==
- Horatio Brown, chapter 'San Nicolo del Lido' in Life on the Lagoons (1884 and later editions)
