= Venetian expedition to the Levant (1099–1100) =

In 1099–1100, the Republic of Venice sent a large fleet to assist the First Crusade in the Levant. Under preparation since 1097 or 1096, the fleet sailed after the capture of Jerusalem by the Crusaders and after the fleets of Venice's Genoese and Pisan rivals. The details of the expedition are somewhat obscure, as the main source is a single religious text, which reports a naval battle against a Pisan fleet off the harbour of Rhodes, the discovery and translation of relics purporting to belong to Saint Nicholas from Myra to Venice, and the Venetians' participation in the capture of the port city of Haifa in August 1100, before the fleet returned home.

== Background ==
When Pope Urban II declared the First Crusade in 1095, he also sent envoys to the main Italian maritime republics for naval assistance to the crusading armies. The Republic of Genoa was the first to respond, sending a small squadron east in 1097, which joined with the Byzantine navy in the Crusade's early operations, apparently followed by smaller squadrons and individual ships. The Genoese assistance in the Siege of Antioch was enough for Genoa to secure a commercial colony in the city. The main events of the campaign in the Levant however, up to and including the capture of Jerusalem in 1099, took place on land, without the assistance of a major Crusader fleet, leaving the seas off the Levant largely in the control of the powerful Fatimid navy.

In response to the Pope's pleas, the Republic of Pisa mustered a large fleet that sailed in 1098: the Annales Pisani record 120 ships, although the number is likely exaggerated. On its way east, it wintered in the Ionian Islands, part of the Byzantine Empire. The Byzantine princess and historian Anna Komnene records that the Pisans plundered the islands, likely either because the Byzantine authorities refused to allow the Pisans to stay there or because the supplies provided were insufficient for the exceptionally large Pisan fleet. The Pisan fleet is known to have reached Latakia in November 1099, where they assisted Bohemond I of Antioch in besieging the city, then held by the Byzantines, and to have remained in the Levant until it sailed home in early April 1100. For the Pisans too, the voyage was profitable: the Archbishop of Pisa, Dagobert, accompanied their fleet as papal legate and became the Latin Patriarch of Jerusalem, helping his mother city secure significant trading privileges in the new Kingdom of Jerusalem.

== Venetian expedition ==
Map of the newly established Crusader states in the Levant in 1102

=== Preparations ===
While the Pisans and Genoese were active in the Crusade and took the opportunity to extend their presence into the Eastern Mediterranean for the first time, the Republic of Venice was not yet involved. Traditionally this has been interpreted as reflecting the Republic's preoccupation with the Adriatic Sea and their existing trade networks with the Byzantine Empire and Fatimid Egypt, rather than with the Levant. However, it is likely that, as the 16th-century Venetian historian Andrea Navagero reports, Papal envoys had also come to Venice, and there is evidence to support the notion that preparations for a major expedition began as early as 1097 or even 1096, with the Venetians concluding agreements for the participation of the Dalmatian city-states in the fleet, as indicated by a surviving treaty with Spalato. In the event, the Doge of Venice, Vitale I Michiel managed to gather the largest fleet to ever sail from Italy for the Levant, reportedly of 200 ships, under the command of Enrico Contarini, Bishop of Castello, and Giovanni Michiel, the Doge's son. The 16th-century Venetian historian Marino Sanuto the Younger gives a detailed breakdown of the fleet as 80 galleys, 72 round ships (navi) for cargo, and 44 horse transports (tarete), but the accuracy of such numbers is uncertain.

=== Battle against the Pisans at Rhodes ===
The voyage of the Venetian fleet is chiefly relayed in an account of the translation of the relics of Saint Nicholas from Myra to Venice, written about 15–20 years after the events by a monk of the monastery of San Nicolò al Lido. Some of the details are confirmed or complemented by other sources, the Annales Venetici breves and the history of Andrea Dandolo. The fleet left Venice in July 1099, and sailed via Zara to the island of Rhodes on 28 October, where they decided to stay for the winter. Rhodes had previously been occupied by Turkish raiders, and was likely only recently restored to Byzantine control. According to the Venetian accounts, the Byzantine emperor, Alexios I Komnenos, unsuccessfully tried to bribe and threaten the Venetians not to continue for the Levant, although the reason for this is not stated.

The Venetians stayed at Rhodes until 27 May 1100. While they were still at Rhodes, a Pisan fleet of 50 ships appeared before Rhodes city and demanded entrance to its harbour. This was likely part of the Pisan force that had sailed for home in April. The Venetian accounts claim that the Pisans falsely flew Byzantine colours, and demanded entrance to the harbour. A battle followed, where 30 Venetian vessels engaged the Pisans and defeated them, losing only four ships against 22 Pisan ones that were captured. Four thousand prisoners were taken, but when Byzantine officials on Rhodes asked the Venetians to hand them over for execution at Constantinople, as punishment for falsely flying the Imperial colours, the Venetians refused. Apart from a small number (30 or 36) of prominent men kept as hostages, the Pisan prisoners were released on condition that they no longer make war on other Christians, as well as refrain from trade in the Byzantine Empire. Why the Venetians and Pisans engaged in battle remains unclear, however, as there was no cause for fighting and Rhodes had other harbours and was large enough to supply both fleets. Although the battle is often accepted as fact and part of the Venetian–Pisan rivalry for trade routes, naval historian John H. Pryor opines that "the entire tale reeks of fabrication" and that such a lopsided victory by a numerically inferior force in a combat between galley fleets is highly unlikely. Donald Nicol also doubts the veracity of the account, and points out that the prohibition for the Pisans from engaging in trade in Byzantium is anachronistic for the time in question.

=== Abduction of the relics of Saint Nicholas ===
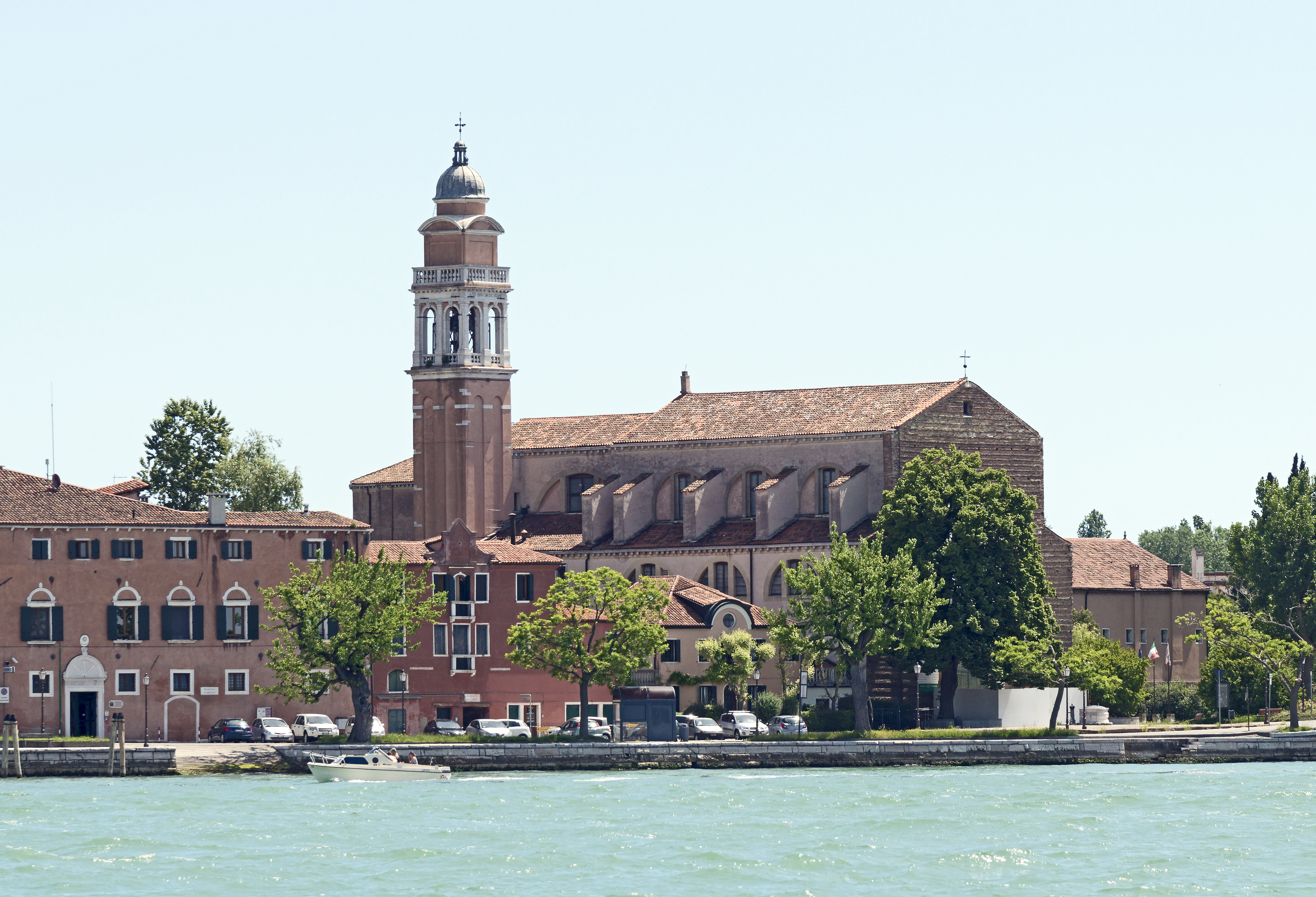
The church of San Nicolò al Lido in Venice, where the purported relics of Saint Nicholas are kept

After they left Rhodes, the Venetians went on to Myra on the southern coast of Asia Minor, where they "miraculously" obtained the remains of Saint Nicholas, his uncle Nicholas and Saint Theodore the Martyr, notwithstanding the fact that the relics of Saint Nicholas had already been stolen in 1087 by sailors from Bari and brought to that city, where they were housed in a specially built church. The story, as told by the Venetian sources, is that they found three tombs in the church, of which one, that belonging to Saint Nicholas, was empty, as the sailors from Bari had taken it; but after Bishop Enrico prayed for a long time, a fragrant odour revealed the location of another grave, where the real Saint Nicholas lay buried. The miraculous nature of the discovery was further strengthened by the presence in the tomb of a fresh palm leaf, while an inscription in Greek purportedly revealed this to be the saint's real burial place.

The Greek Orthodox bishop of Myra protested the desecration and robbery of his church, comparing the Venetians to the Turks. The Venetians returned one of the reliquaries and 100 gold coins for the damage they had inflicted, but kept the relics. With this acquisition, the Bishop of Castello obtained a patron saint of his own to rival Saint Mark, whose relics had likewise miraculously appeared in Saint Mark's Basilica, the chapel of the Doge of Venice, a few years earlier.

=== Siege of Haifa and return ===
From Myra the Venetians sailed on east. Off Cyprus they encountered Raymond IV, Count of Toulouse, who was sailing to Constantinople to meet with Emperor Alexios I. From there they reached Jaffa by 24 June, at which date the Venetian sources report an agreement with the Crusaders to give them military assistance until 15 August, in exchange for a third of all booty captured (in the case of Tripoli, half of the booty), a Venetian trading quarter in any city captured, an exemption from taxes on commerce and from right of shipwreck for all Venetian shipping. As part of this agreement, the Venetians assisted in the siege of Haifa, which fell to the Crusaders on 20 August. No historical source from the Crusader states mentions the Venetian participation in the capture of Haifa, but according to John Pryor this may be because they lacked the relevant sources (William of Tyre) or were not present with the Crusader army at the time (Fulcher of Chartres).

The fleet then returned to Venice, which they reached on 6 December 1100, the feast day of Saint Nicholas. The relics from Myra were placed in the Monastery of San Nicolò al Lido. Founded in 1053, the monastery was a highly symbolic location, on the boundary of the Venetian Lagoon and the open sea; it was the first sight ships coming to Venice got of the city itself, and the place where the Doges of Venice were acclaimed upon their election until 1172.

== Aftermath ==
Venice sent another fleet east in 1110, under the personal command of Doge Ordelafo Faliero. The Venetians assisted King Baldwin I of Jerusalem in the capture of Sidon. At the same time, their rivals were also active: the Genoese established themselves at Acre, while the Pisans also received trading privileges and the right to establish a merchant colony at Constantinople. In 1122, Doge Domenico Michiel led the Venetian Crusade, which defeated a Fatimid fleet off Ascalon and then helped capture Tyre from the Fatimids. According to historian Christopher Wright it was a perfect example of the "entwining of crusading purposes in the Levant with the vigorous pursuit of Venetian interests along the way", as the Venetians used the expedition to try and put pressure on Emperor John II Komnenos to restore the trading privileges that he had revoked by trying to seize Corfu on the way to the Levant and then raiding Byzantine territories on the return journey, while Michiel also restored Venetian authority in Dalmatia before returning to Venice. Venetians also stole the relics of Saint Stephen from Constantinople, and of Saint Donatus from Cephalonia, bringing them to Venice.

== Sources ==
- Frankopan, Peter (2015). The Silk Roads: A New History of the World. London: Bloomsbury. ISBN 978-1-4088-3999-7.
- Lane, Frederic Chapin (1973). Venice: A Maritime Republic. Baltimore, Maryland: Johns Hopkins University Press. ISBN 0-8018-1445-6.
- Nicol, Donald M. (1988). Byzantium and Venice: A Study in Diplomatic and Cultural Relations. Cambridge: Cambridge University Press. ISBN 0-521-34157-4.
- Pryor, John H. (2006). "Naval History, 1096–1099". In Murray, Alan V. (ed.). The Crusades: An Encyclopedia. Santa Barbara, California: ABC-CLIO. pp. 864–869. ISBN 1-57607-862-0.
- Pryor, John H. (2008). "A View from the Masthead: The First Crusade from the Sea". Crusades. 7. Ashgate Publishing: 87–152. doi:10.1080/28327861.2008.12220214. ISSN 1476-5276.
- Romano, Dennis (2024). Venice: The Remarkable History of the Lagoon City. Oxford University Press. ISBN 978-0-19085998-5.
- Wright, Christopher (2021). "Sea Power and the Evolution of Venetian Crusading". In Skoblar, Magdalena (ed.). Byzantium, Venice and the Medieval Adriatic: Spheres of Maritime Power and Influence, c. 700-1453. Cambridge: Cambridge University Press. pp. 328–350. ISBN 978-1-10884070-5.
