= Battle of Rhodes =

Battle of Rhodes can refer to several battles and sieges throughout history.

- Siege of Rhodes (305–304 BC), by Demetrius I of Macedon
- Battle of Rhodes (1100), naval battle between Venetians and Pisans off the city of Rhodes
- Hospitaller conquest of Rhodes (1306–1310)
- Siege of Rhodes (1444), unsuccessful attempt by the Mamluks under Aynal Gecut to expel the Knights Hospitaller from the island
- Siege of Rhodes (1480), first, unsuccessful attempt by the Ottoman Empire to expel the Knights Hospitaller from the island
- Siege of Rhodes (1522), second, successful attempt by the Ottoman Empire to expel the Knights Hospitaller from the island
- Battle of Rhodes (1912), Italian capture of the island during the Italo-Turkish War
- Battle of Rhodes (1943), German invasion during World War II.
