= Theodore the Martyr =

Christian saint

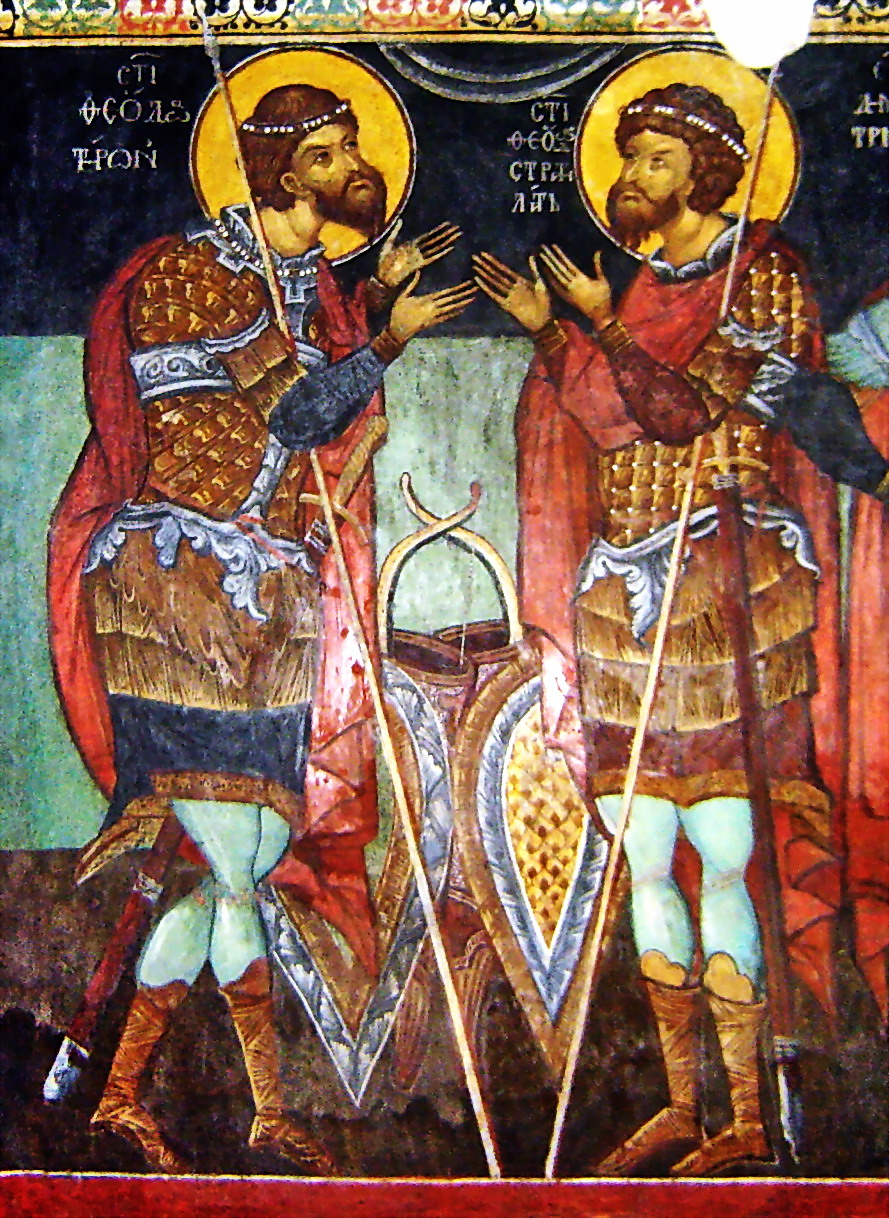
- Saints Theodore of Amasea and Theodore Stratelates in a fresco from Kremikocvtsi Monastery, near Sofia, Bulgaria
- Born: Θεόδωρος
- Known for: Sainthood

Theodore the Martyr refers to the two saints Theodore of Amasea (Theodore the Recruit) and Theodore Stratelates (Theodore the General), two important military saints of the Byzantine period. The two saints are likely identical in origin, the veneration of Theodore of Amasea is ascertained for the late 4th century, while the tradition of Theodore Stratelates develops from that of Theodore of Amasea by the 9th century. There is a Coptic Life of Theodore the General, which places his martyrdom in Egypt. In Coptic tradition, the saint is also known as Saint Theodore of Shwtp.

There are other martyrs called Theodore, see Theodore and Pausilippus (2nd c.), Theodore, Philippa and companions (3rd c.), Teodor Komogovinski (1788).

== Accounts ==
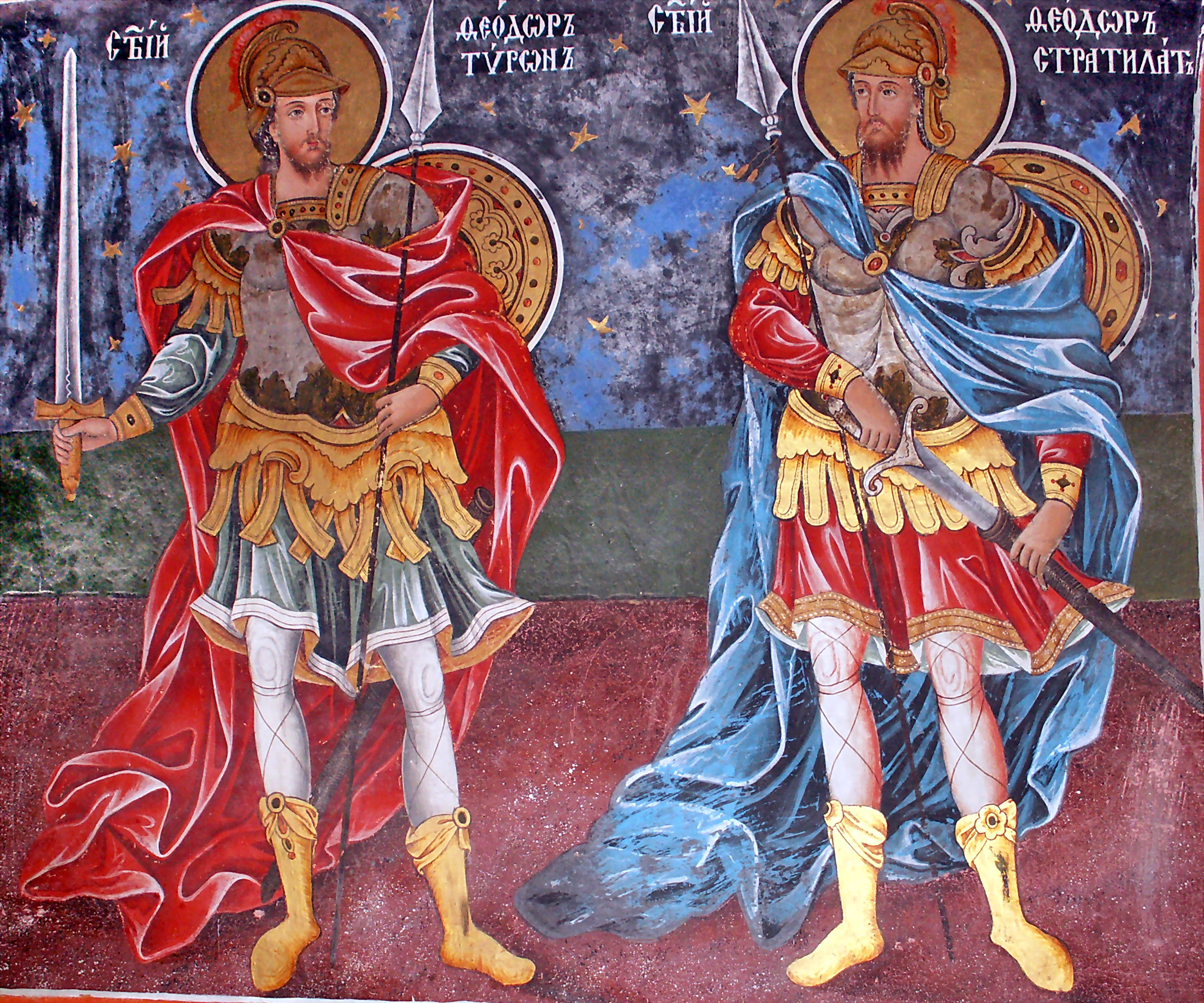
Saints Theodore Tyron and Theodore Stratelates in a fresco from Rila Monastery, Bulgaria

According to the Book of the Saints of the Ethiopian Church, Saint Theodore the Martyr was a captain of the soldiers of the city of Setb, in the province of Asyut in Upper Egypt. A church was dedicated to him, and great signs and wonders took place through his body. Abu al-Makarim, writing in 1348, says there was a church named after him in Babylon, Egypt.

Gregory of Nyssa (c. 335 – c. 395) gave an Oration on Theodore the Martyr in Amasia in 383, in the church where the saint's remains were said to be located. This Theodore was a Roman soldier martyred around 303 in the time of the Emperor Maximian (c. 250 – 310). He was among a surge of soldiers who were martyred in the 4th century. He is described as "a poor soldier, newly conscripted." Gregory said, "This, as we believe, is he who during the past year calmed the stormy fury of the barbarians, and stopped the terrible war of the savage Scythians". He called on Theodore for assistance, saying "gather together the troops of thy brother martyrs, and thou with them beseech God to stay the invasion of the barbarians." Gregory wrote, "The hues of the ornamentation in the church are veritably like a book that speaks, for painting even if silent knows how to speak from the wall." This speech is often used in defense of the use of religious images.

The Emperor John I Tzimiskes fought a successful battle against the Russians in 970 in which the whole Greek army saw a champion on a white horse fighting before the first ranks. He disappeared after the battle was won. The Russian prince Sviatoslav I of Kiev was forced to abandon Bulgaria and retreat to Russia. The victory occurred on the anniversary of Saint Theodore the Martyr, and the army thought that the knight on the white horse was the saint. The emperor repaired the church of Theodore in Euchaneia, and changed the name of that city to Theodoropolis. (Note: The Theodore who intervened for the Emperor John I Tzimiskes would have been Theodore Stratelates of Euchaneia. Some sources confuse him with Theodore of Amasea and therefore say that the Emperor changed the name of Euchaita to Theodoropolis.)

Saint Theodore was the patron saint of the Capuchins. An observer in Rome in 1844 of a Capuchin's panegyric of Saint Theodore at the church dedicated to the martyr, on the saint's day, recorded as a sample,

But he hath left us the memory of his battles as a lesson, assembling the faithful in crowds, instructing the Church, driving away evil spirits, bringing down good angels among us, procuring all suitable gifts for us from God, converting this place into a hospital for every variety of disease, a haven for those who are tossed in a sea of affliction, a store-house for the needy poor, a secure home for the wayfarer, a never-failing place of meeting for those who celebrate the festival.

== Relics ==
=== Italy ===
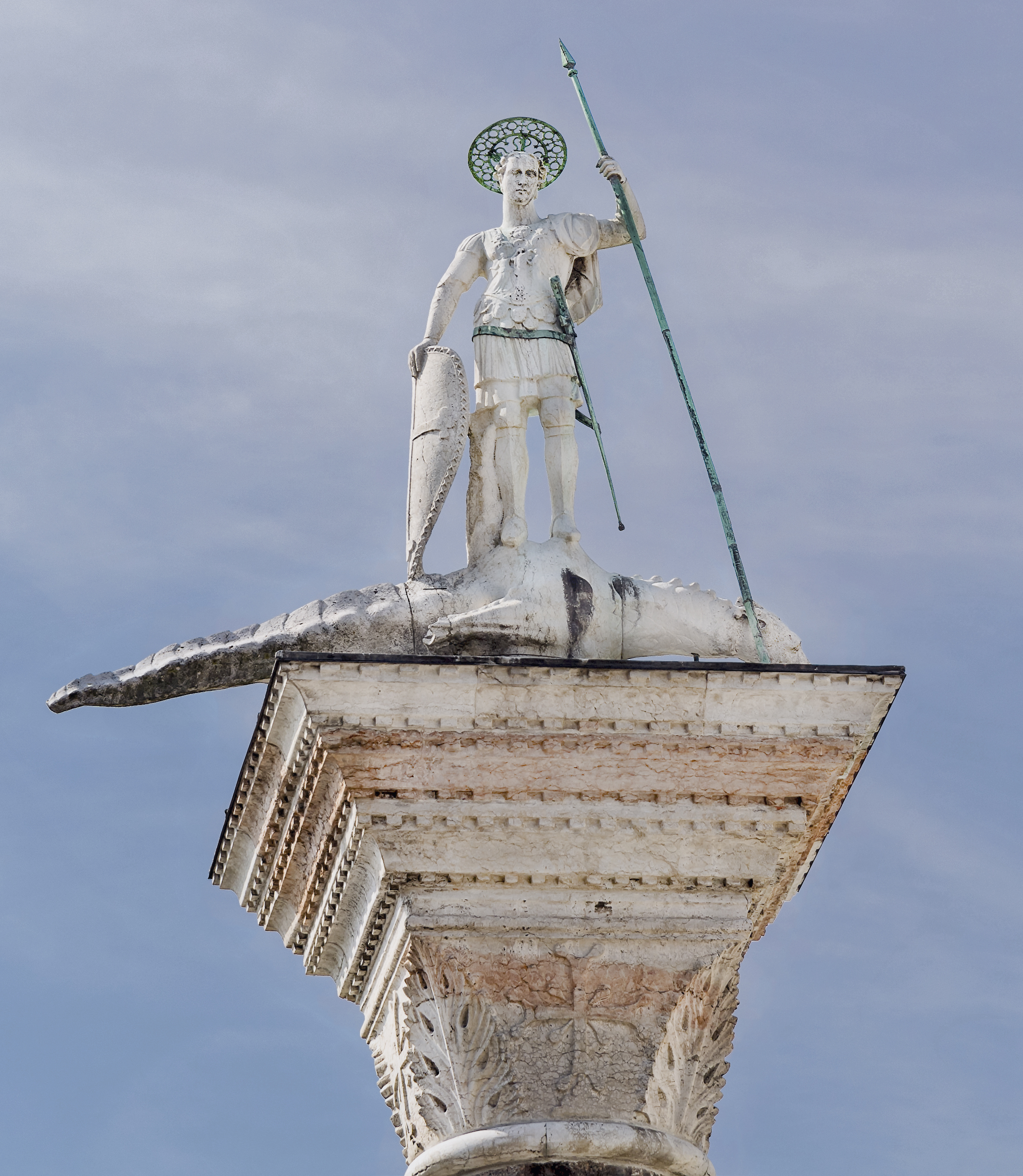
Statue of St Theodore on western column in Piazzetta in Venice

In 1100 the remains of Saint Theodore the Martyr were stolen from Myra in Asia Minor and taken to Venice, along with the body of Saint Nicholas of Myra and his uncle, also Nicholas. This occurred during an expedition to the Holy Land of about 200 ships dispatched by the Doge Vitale Michiel of Venice under the spiritual leadership of Enrico Contarini, the Bishop of Olivolo. Theodore the Martyr became one of the four tutelary guardians of Venice, along with the angel Gabriel, the Virgin Mary and Saint Mark the Evangelist. However, Saint Theodore was often used as a symbol of Venice's affiliation to Byzantium and as Venice became more independent, Saint Theodore's presence waned in the city.

In 1257 Jacopo Dauro raided Mesembria on the Bulgarian coast of the Black Sea, and took the headless body of Saint Theodore the Martyr from its church of Saint Sophia. The saint was headless because the Emperor Licinius had decapitated him after he had slain a dragon. A relative of Jacopo, Marco Dauro, took the body to Venice where he placed it in the church of San Salvador. Saint Theodore and the dragon were later commemorated in a statue on top of his column in Venice. The Irish friar Simon Fitz-Simon passed through Venice in 1323 on his way to the Holy Land, and listed Theodore the Martyr among the bodies of saints that lay in the city, "whole and uncorrupted".

The Jesuit Richa in his History of the Churches of Florence recorded that at the Convent of our Lady of the Murate there was a rib of St. Theodore the Martyr, which had been mislaid and forgotten, but which the saint revealed in a vision to Sister Maria of Scarperia. The chronicle of the convent included many wonderful events associated with this relic. An 1872 account tells of a small church of Theodore the Martyr at the foot of Palatine Hill in Rome. Mothers would bring their children to the church to kiss the saint's relic.

=== Elsewhere ===
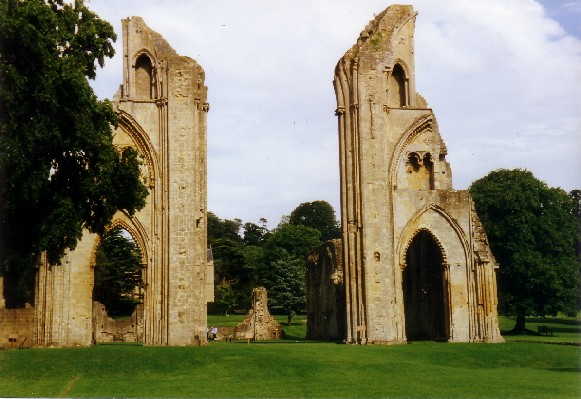
Glastonbury Abbey once held relics of Theodore

At Thorney, Cambridgeshire, England, a new church was built by Abbott Gunther in 1069. In 1105 relics of Theodore the Martyr were translated to the church. John of Glastonbury's Cronica sive Antiquitates Glastoniensis Ecclesie, written in the mid-14th century, recorded that Glastonbury Abbey had relics of Theodore the Martyr.

During the Fourth Crusade (1202–1204) the German monk Gunther of Pairis obtained a variety of relics, including a trace of the blood of Jesus. The collection included a piece of the True Cross, a piece of Saint John the Baptist and the arm of Saint James the Great. There were relics of other saints including Theodore the Martyr.

The Clairvaux inventory of 1504 included a number of relics including the shoulder blade of Saint Theodore the Martyr. The Dames de l'Assomption of rue Saint-Honoré in Paris, who rebuilt their church in 1670 at their own expense, preserved the body of Saint Theodore the Martyr with great veneration. It had been given to them by Cardinal Antonio Barberini, the Archbishop of Rheims.

Philip II of Spain (1527–1598) was a great collector of relics, and accumulated a huge collection. It included 290 teeth of Saint Apollonia, the patron saint of toothache. His successors continued to add to the collection. In 1762 it was reported that the body of Saint Theodore the Martyr was lying in a magnificent shrine of silver or brass gilt, adorned with crystals and gems and enameled with gold, in the monastery of El Escorial near Madrid, Spain.

== Sources ==
- Armenian, Abu Salih the (2001). The Churches and Monasteries of Egypt and Some Neighbouring Countries. Gorgias Press LLC. ISBN 978-0-9715986-7-6.
- A.W. (1872). "Our Ancestors". The Month: An Illustrated Magazine of Literature, Science and Art. The Month.
- Batty, Elizabeth Frances (1820). Italian Scenery: From Drawings Made in 1817. Rodwell & Martin. p. 169.
- Biale, David (2012-08-29). Cultures of the Jews: A New History. Knopf Doubleday Publishing Group. ISBN 978-0-307-48346-1.
- Bird, Jessalynn; Peters, Edward; Powell, James M. (2013-03-26). Crusade and Christendom: Annotated Documents in Translation from Innocent III to the Fall of Acre, 1187–1291. University of Pennsylvania Press. ISBN 978-0-8122-0765-1.
- Bitton-Ashkelony, Bruria (2005). Encountering the Sacred: The Debate on Christian Pilgrimage in Late Antiquity. University of California Press. ISBN 978-0-520-93112-1.
- Borromeo, Federico (2010). EST Des Beigef. Werkes: Musaeum. Harvard University Press. ISBN 978-0-674-04758-7.
- Book of the Saints of the Ethiopian Church: A Translation of the Ethiopic Synaxarium (Mashafa Senkesar) : Made from the Mss. Oriental 660 and 661 in the British Museum. CUP Archive. 1928. GGKEY:CWSRNA6K1R2.
- Bunson, Matthew; Bunson, Stephen (2003). Our Sunday Visitor's Encyclopedia of Saints. Our Sunday Visitor Publishing. ISBN 978-1-931709-75-0.
- Carley, James P. (1985). The Chronicle of Glastonbury Abbey: An Edition, Translation and Study of John of Glastonbury's "Cronica Sive Antiquitates Glastoniensis Ecclesie". Boydell & Brewer. ISBN 978-0-85115-859-4.
- Crick, Julia C.; Houts, Elisabeth van (2011-04-21). A Social History of England, 900–1200. Cambridge University Press. ISBN 978-1-139-50085-2.
- Davis, Robert Charles; Marvin, Garry (2004). Venice, the Tourist Maze: A Cultural Critique of the World's Most Touristed City. University of California Press. ISBN 978-0-520-24120-6.
- Freeman, Samuel (1839). "A Discourse Concerning the Invocation of Saints". The Protestant's manual: consisting of sermons and tracts, selected from the works of the best English divines, on the principal points of the popish controversy : with an introduction and notes. William Whyte and Co., Glasgow, W. Collins.
- Fuentes, Carlos (January 1999). The Buried Mirror: Reflections on Spain and the New World. Houghton Mifflin Harcourt. ISBN 978-0-395-92499-0.
- Greer, Rowan A. (2008-01-31). The Fear of Freedom. Penn State Press. ISBN 978-0-271-03944-2.
- Katsev, Igor (2013). "Origin and Meaning of Theodore". Mfnames.com.
- Kelly, Walter Keating (1854). The history of Russia, from the earliest period to the present time: Compiled from the most authentic sources, including the Works of Karamsin, Tooke, and Ségur. In 2 vol. Bohn.
- Mant, Richard (1844). "Rome, her tenets and her Practices". The Dublin Review. Burns and Oates.
- Nicol, Donald M. (1992-05-07). Byzantium and Venice: A Study in Diplomatic and Cultural Relations. Cambridge University Press. ISBN 978-0-521-42894-1.
- Noone, Michael John (1998). Music and Musicians in the Escorial Liturgy Under the Habsburgs, 1563–1700. University Rochester Press. ISBN 978-1-878822-71-0.
- Schenk, Jochen (2012-03-29). Templar Families: Landowning Families and the Order of the Temple in France, C.1120–1307. Cambridge University Press. ISBN 978-1-107-00447-4.
- Smith, William; Wace, Henry (1887). A Dictionary of Christian Biography, Literature, Sects and Doctrines: Being a Continuation of 'The Dictionary of the Bible'. Little, Brown & Company.
- The History of Paris: From the Earliest Period to the Present Day; Containing a Description of Its Antiquities, Public Buildings, Civil, Religious, Scientific and Commercial Institutions ... To which is Added, an Appendix: Containing a Notice of the Church of Saint Denis; an Account of the Violation of the Royal Tombs; Important Statistical Tables. A. and W. Galignani. 1825.
- Thompson, George (1762). "A description of the Escurial". The critical review, or annals of literature.
- Trollope, Thomas Adolphus (1856). The girlhood of Catherine de' Medici. Chapman and Hall. p. 363.
- Universal History (1780). An universal history, from the earliest accounts to the present time. Printed for C. Bathurst. p. 98.
- Walsh, Michael J. (2007). A New Dictionary of Saints: East and West. Liturgical Press. ISBN 978-0-8146-3186-7.
- Walter, Christopher (2003). The Warrior Saints in Byzantine Art and Tradition. Ashgate Publishing, Ltd. ISBN 978-1-84014-694-3.
