= Theodore and Pausilippus =

2nd century Christian martyrs

Saints Theodore and Pausilippus

Martyrs
- Died: 130; Byzantium
- Venerated in: Roman Catholic Church
- Canonized: Pre-congregation
- Feast: 5 April

Saints Theodore and Pausilippus (died 130 AD) were 2nd century Christian martyrs who were killed during the persecution of Christians under the Roman emperor Hadrian. They died at Byzantium.

== See also ==
- Theodore the Martyr
