= Enrico Contarini =

Venetian priest

- Diocese: Roman Catholic Diocese of Castello
- Installed: 1074
- Term ended: 15 November 1108
- Predecessor: Domenico VII Contarini
- Successor: Vitale I Michiel

Personal details
- Died: 15 November 1108
- Denomination: Catholic

Enrico Contarini (died 15 November 1108) was a Venetian priest who was Bishop of Castello from 1074 to 1108.

== Biography ==
Enrico Contarini was the son of the Doge Domenico Contarini of the aristocratic Venetian family (House of Contarini). He was appointed Bishop of Olivolo or Rialto in 1074. That year the Bishop of Olivolo began to be styled the Bishop of Castello. Enrico Contarini was the first to hold this title.

The Doge Vitale Michiel (1096-1112) held back from participating in the First Crusade until he saw the amount of loot that the Genoese and Pisans were bringing back from Palestine. In 1099 Enrico Contarini was the spiritual leader of the fleet of about 200 ships that Michiel sent to assist in the crusade in the Levant. The fleet sailed to Rhodes, where it wintered. The emperor of Byzantium asked the Venetians not to proceed, but the bishop overcame any who were inclined to listen to this request.

In the spring of 1100 the fleet went on to Myra in Asia Minor, where they obtained the remains of Saint Nicholas, his uncle Nicholas and Saint Theodore the Martyr. They went on to the Holy Land, then returned to Venice, which they reached on 6 December 1100. With Saint Nicholas the Bishop obtained a patron saint to rival the Doge's Saint Mark. Theodore the Martyr became one of the four tutelary guardians of Venice, along with the angel Gabriel, the Virgin Mary and Saint Mark the Evangelist.

Enrico Contarini died in office on 15 November 1108.

== See also ==
- Catholic Church in Italy
