= Ordelafo Faliero =

Doge of Venice from 1102 to 1117

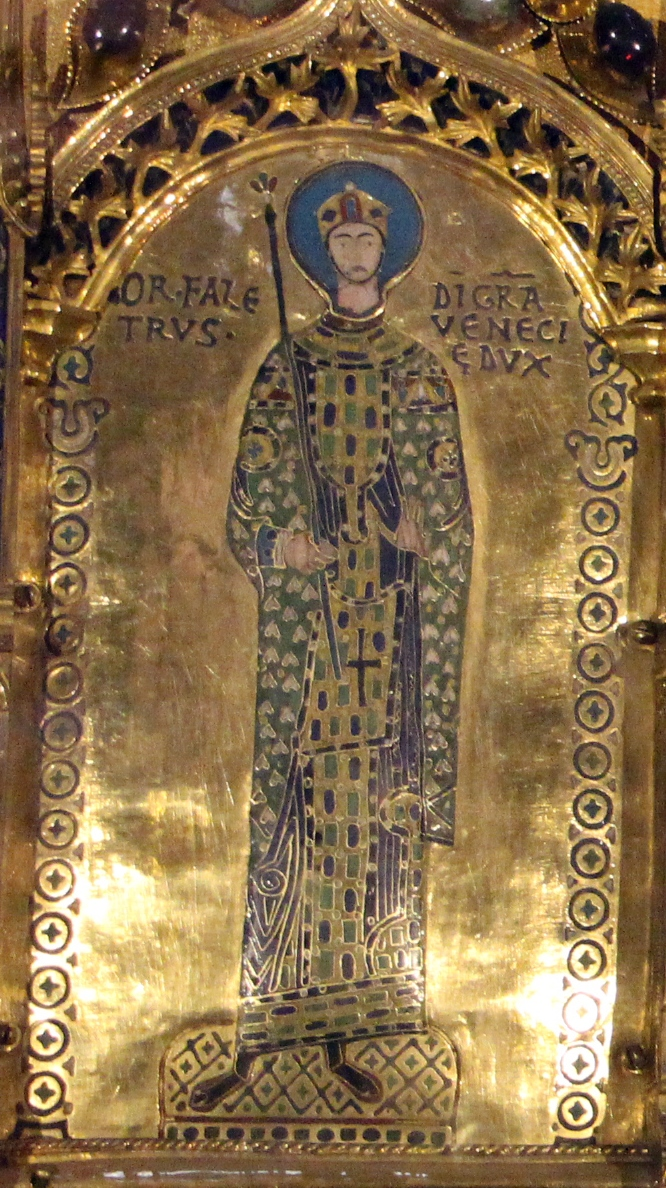
- Doge Ordelafo Faliero, from Pala d'Oro, Venice

Doge of Venice
- In office 1102–1117
- Preceded by: Vitale I Michiel
- Succeeded by: Domenico Michiel

Personal details
- Born: Unknown
- Died: 1117

Ordelafo Faliero de Doni (also spelled Dodoni; died 1117 in Zadar, then part of the Kingdom of Hungary) was the 34th Doge of Venice, serving from 1102 until his death. His dogeship marked a period of expansion for the Republic of Venice, including military campaigns in Dalmatia and the early development of the Venetian Arsenal.

== Biography ==
He was the son of the 32nd Doge, Vitale Faliero de' Doni. He was a member of the Minor Council (minor consiglio), an assembly formed from members of the so-called "apostolic families" that, in oligarchical Venice, assumed the governmental functions of judges, military councilmen, ambassadors and heads of state.

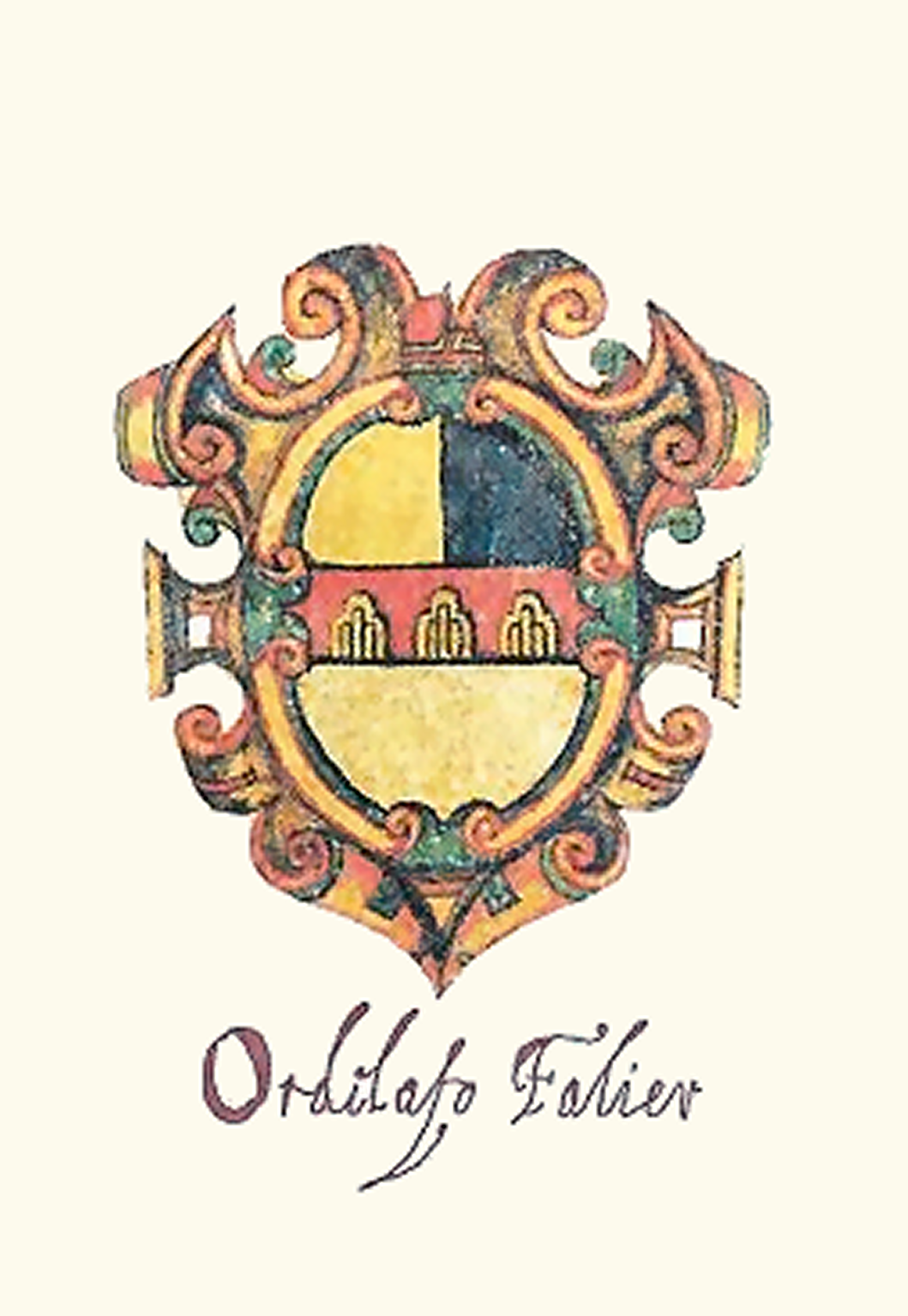
Coat-of-arms of Ordelafo Faliero.

His first name, which is otherwise unknown in Venetian history, is thought to have been derived from a backwards spelling of the Venetian name "Faledro", or from the Ordelaffi family, of which the Faliero family is thought to be a lineage.

In 1105 the new Croatian king, Coloman of Hungary, enabled by the alliance to the Byzantine Emperor Alexios I Komnenos, launched campaign against Venetians, and reasserted the northeastern Adriatic coast under his royal authority.

In 1106, a terrible flood happened in Venice. On the island of Malamocco, the old capital of Venice, the entire community was swept away.

In that same year, a great fire destroyed large areas in Rialto. The Basilica of Saint Mark and the then Doge’s Palace escaped with relatively minor damage because of their stone and marble construction. Since then, the use of wood for building was actively discouraged.

In 1110, Faliero fearing the rise of Pisan and Genoese trade in East, was engaged in an expedition to Syria to aid the crusaders, comprising 100 Venetian ships.

The Venetian fleet helped Baldwin I to capture Sidon. As a reward, Venice received a part of Acre. Also, the Venetians took back the relics of Saint Stephen the Protomartyr.

In Venice, Faliero established the nucleus of what would become the Arsenal. The shipbuilding became a nationalized industry. For its centre Doge chose two islands in the east of the city.

In 1115, Doge managed to retake some of the disputed area in Dalmatia. According to J.Norwich, Holy Roman Emperor Henry V - who had visited the city before the campaign, and Alexius I Comnenos helped the Venetians. Doge reconquered Zadar and several other towns. However, in 1117 he lost his life in a battle beneath the walls of Zara.

A peace treaty was then concluded, according to which Zadar devolved upon Venice, while Biograd, Šibenik, Trogir and Split remained in the Kingdom of Croatia in personal union with Hungary.

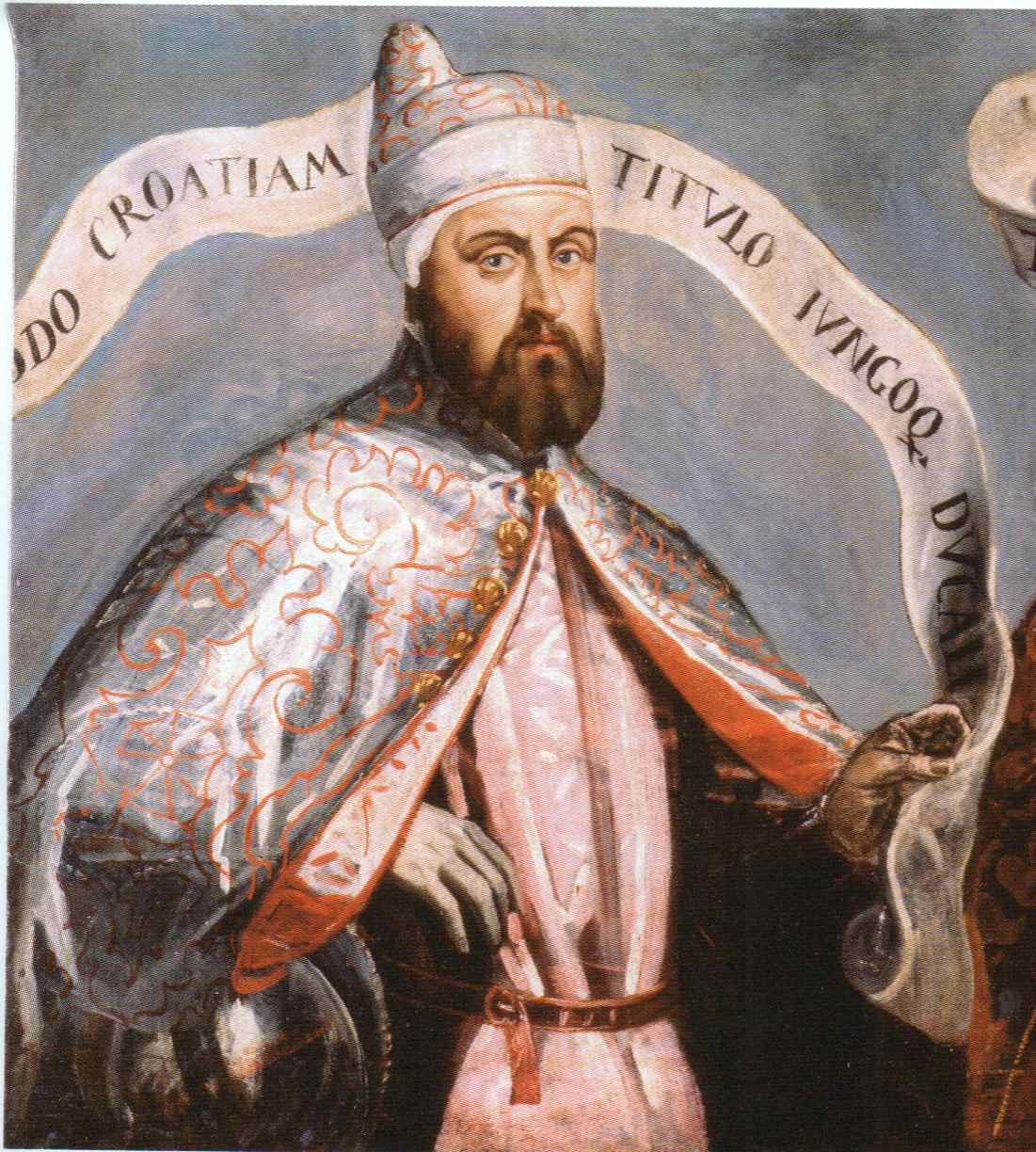
Portrait in the Doge’s Palace

Ordelafo Faliero was married to Matelda, traditionally portrayed as an ideal of spousal fidelity.

== See also ==
- Pala d'Oro

== Sources ==
- Norwich, John Julius (1982). A History of Venice. New York City: Alfred A. Knopf. ISBN 978-0141-01383-1.
- Stephenson, Paul (2000). Byzantium's Balkan Frontier: A Political Study of the Northern Balkans, 900–1204. Cambridge University Press. ISBN 978-0-521-02756-4.

Political offices
Preceded by Vital I Michele	Doge of Venice; 1102-1117	Succeeded by Domenico Michele
