= Vitale I Michiel =

Doge of Venice from 1095 to 1102

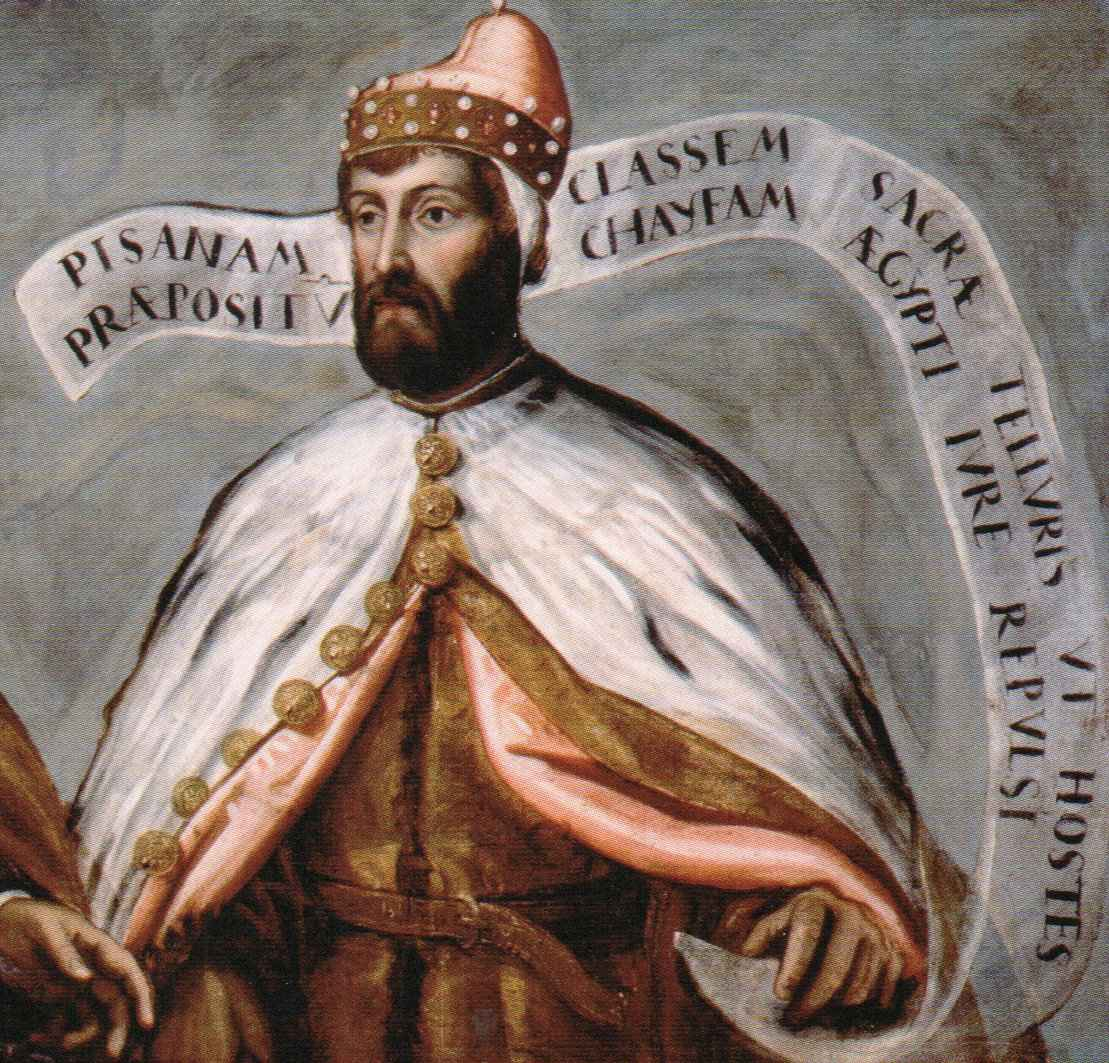
- Portrait in the Doge’s Palace

Doge of Venice
- In office 1095–1102
- Preceded by: Vitale Faliero
- Succeeded by: Ordelafo Faliero

Personal details
- Born: Unknown
- Died: 1102

Vital I Michiel (died 1102) was a Doge of Venice; he was the 33rd traditional (31st historic) Doge of the Republic of Venice. A member of one of the so-called “twelve apostolic” families, he was married to Felicia Cornaro, who had influence on his politics.

== Life ==
When Pope Urban II initiated the First Crusade, Vitale I Michiel did not initially urge Venice’s support, perhaps because he could not see the advantages to Venice of such an expedition.

When Doge Vitale I Michiel saw the European commitment to the First Crusade, he then understood the war’s economic importance. In particular, he foresaw that it was vital to Venice’s trade advantage to participate in territorial conquest, lest these advantages inure to the benefit of other marine republics. In July 1099, 207 ships sailed from Venice to support the First Crusade. Doge Vitale I Michiel appointed his son, Vitale Giovanni, and the Bishop of Castello, Enrico Contarini, as the fleet’s commanders. In December 1099, at Rhodes, the Venetian fleet intercepted enemy ships and sank them.

In the spring of 1100, the Venetian fleet headed towards the Levant, where in the meantime, Godfrey of Bouillon and his troops had taken Jerusalem. Enemy ships had cut off Godfrey’s ability to receive aid and he was forced to negotiate with the Venetians. In exchange for its services, Venice obtained the right to maintain a quarter not subject to custom offices, taxes, or excise taxes in every conquered city or territory.

In 1101, Vitale I Michiele interceded in favor of Mathilde of Tuscany in regards to the purchase of Ferrara, and obtained generous trade concessions as a result. He died in the spring of 1102 and was buried at St. Mark’s Basilica.

Political offices
| Preceded by Vitale Faliero | Doge of Venice; 1095–1102 | Succeeded by Ordelafo Faliero |
