= Venetian nobility =

Noble families of Venice

Coat of arms of the Republic of Venice, featuring the Lion of Saint Mark.

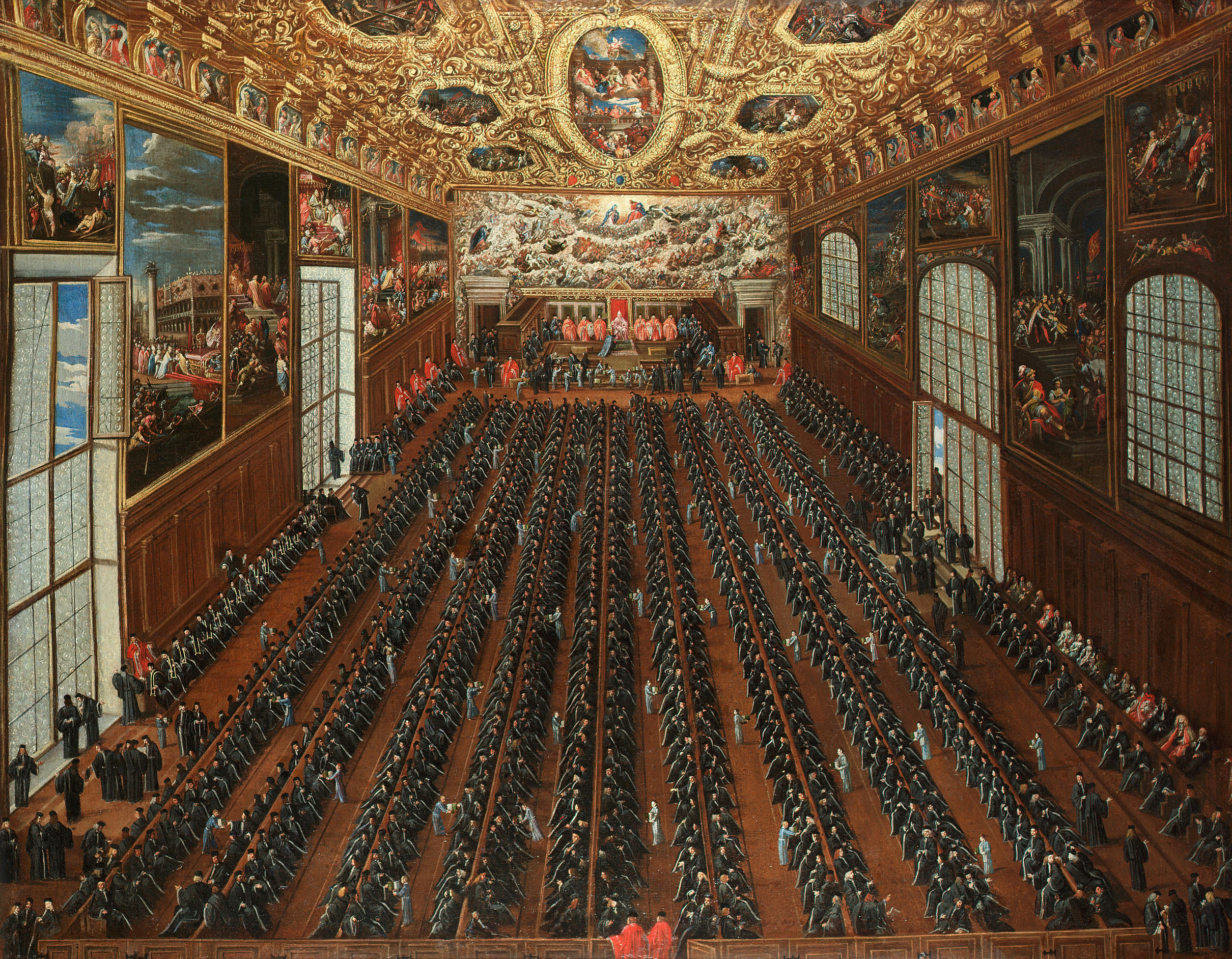
The Great Council in a voting session at the Doge's Palace, 1648.

The Venetian patriciate (Italian: Patriziato veneziano, Venetian: Patrisiato venesian) was one of the three social bodies into which the society of the Republic of Venice was divided, together with citizens and foreigners. Patrizio was the noble title of the members of the aristocracy ruling the city of Venice and the Republic. The title was abbreviated, in front of the name, by the initials N.H. (Nobilis Homo or Nobiluomo), together with the feminine variant N.D. (Nobilis Domina). Holding the title of a Venetian patrician was a great honour and many European kings and princes, as well as foreign noble families, are known to have asked for and obtained the prestigious title.

The patrician houses, formally recorded in the Golden Book, were primarily divided into Old Houses (Case vecchie) and New Houses (Case nuove), with the former being noted for traditionally electing the first Doge in 697 AD. The New Houses were no less significant, as many became very prominent and important in the history of the Republic of Venice. The families were furthermore divided into several other "categories", including Ducal Houses (Case ducali, whose members had become Doges), Newest Houses (Case nuovissime) raised to the patriciate in 1381, non-Venetian patrician families, and "Houses made for money" (Case fatte per soldo, usually wealthy landowning or bourgeoisie families who contributed to the state during the War of Candia and the Morean War).

Although there were numerous noble houses across Venice's Mainland Dominions and the State of the Sea, the Republic was in fact ruled as an aristocratic oligarchy by about 20 to 30 families of Venice's urban nobility, who elected the Doge of Venice, held political and military offices, and directly participated in the daily governing of the state. They were predominantly merchants, with their main source of income being trade with the East and other entrepreneurial activities, on which they became incredibly wealthy. The most important families, who dominated the politics and the history of the state, included the Contarini, Cornaro, Dandolo, Giustinian, Loredan, Mocenigo, Morosini and the Venier families. Nobles were forbidden by law to marry outside of the nobility, so the families intermarried within themselves, and from a young age followed the cursus honorum of Venetian noblemen, training in the army, the naval fleet, the law, and the affairs of state.

== Characteristics ==
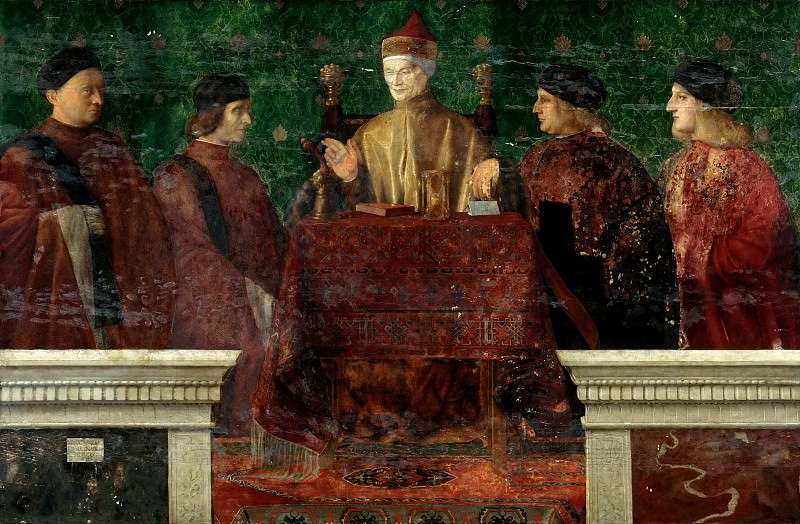
Portrait of the Loredan Family, by Giovanni Bellini, 1507, Gemäldegalerie, Berlin. Leonardo Loredan, 75th Doge of Venice, ruled from 1501 until his death in 1521 and was a member of the Loredan family, one of the Republic's most prominent noble houses. His four sons are depicted wearing the typical regalia of Venetian noblemen.

The basic foundation of belonging to the patriciate was the exclusive possession of political power. Starting from the Great Council Lockout (Serrata del Maggior Consiglio) of 1297 and the law of 1320 which precluded the inclusion of new families, this social body became the only one to have the privilege of sitting in the Great Council, the highest governing body of the city and the state. Privilege concretised with the right for each male member of noble families, starting from the age of majority, to participate in the sessions.

Within the patriciate, all members enjoyed absolute political equality. Each vote, including that of the Doge, had the same value during the voting of the councils. Everyone had, at least theoretically, the same chance of accessing any public office, up to becoming a Savio del Consiglio, Procurator of Saint Mark or the Doge. Reflection of this principle was the equal title of "Nobleman" (Nobilis Vir, Nobilis Homo, Nobil Homo) recognized to the patricians, without any distinction, throughout the Republic. Whoever wore it carried within himself a portion of that sovereignty in which every patrician was a participant, together with the other members of his class. This made the Venetian patricians, in the noble hierarchy, of a rank equal to that of the Princes of the Blood (also given the equal possibility of rising to the royal rank of Doge).

The importance of this social body was such that every aspect of the Venetian noble's life was carefully monitored and regulated by the State, which took care to carefully verify all family ties and deeds necessary to prove the registration of the nobles into the Golden Book (Libro d'Oro), the register of nobles strictly guarded in the Doge's Palace. There was also a Silver Book, which registered all those families that not only had the requisites of "civilization" and "honour", but could also show that they were of ancient Venetian origin; such families furnished the manpower for the State bureaucracy – and particularly, the chancellery within the Doge's Palace itself. Both books were kept in a chest in the Scrigno room of the Doge's Palace, inside a cupboard that also contained all the documents proving the legitimacy of claims to be inscribed therein.

The robe of the nobles was the toga of black cloth with wide sleeves, lined in red for the Savi, the Avogadori and the leaders of the Quarantia. The toga became completely red for the senators and the ducal councilors. The whole was completed by the squat beret (a low cylindrical hat of black cloth) and the fur indicating the rank within the magistracy. It was an absolute obligation to wear the regalia during the exercise of one's office, in the councils and in the entire area of Saint Mark's Square.

Alongside this political aspect, however, the Venetian nobility had another peculiar character in their mercantile vocation. Contrary to the feudal nobility, in fact, the patriciate in Venice based its power not on the possession of land, but on the wealth of trade with the East as the basis of the entire economy. This stimulated this social class to a remarkable dynamism and resulted in incredible wealth.

The patricians thus served themselves and the state as captains of galleys, merchants, ambassadors, governors, public officials, and in every other form of civil and military organisation of the Republic.

Being Venetian patricians was an honour for all of European nobility and it was common with princes and kings of other states to ask for and obtain the title of N.H., including, among others, the kings of France, the Savoy, the Mancinis, the Rospigliosi, and the papal families of the Orsini and the Colonna.

== Noble houses ==
These very ancient families died out before the Great Council Lockout of 1297, but nevertheless played a leading role in the politics of the Republic. Given their historical distance, the information and knowledge about these families is very scarce and steeped in legend.

Arms	Family	Notable members	Description
	Candiano	Pietro I, Pietro II, Pietro III, Pietro IV, Vitale	Originally from Padua, they gave five Doges to the Republic in the 9th and 10th centuries.
	Centranico	Pietro	Sometimes also called Barbo or Barbolano.
	Flabanico	Domenico	
	Galbaio	Giovanni, Maurizio	The surname came from the family's reputed descent from the ancient Roman emperor Galba.
	Ipato	Gioviano, Orso, Teodato	The surname is thought to be derived from imperial honorific hypatos, granted to Orso by Emperor Leo III the Isaurian.
	Monegario	Domenico	The surname may derive from monegarium, that is, a friar or monk, or monetarium, that is, a minter.
	Orseolo	Frozza, Giovanni, Otto, Peter, St. Pietro I, Pietro II	Descended from Orso and Teodato Ipato, they gave three Doges to the Republic and are notable for leading the Venetian expansion into Dalmatia.
	Participazio	Agnello, Giovanni I, Giovanni II, Giustiniano, Orso I, Orso II, Pietro	A dynasty originally from Eraclea, they gave seven Doges to the Republic in the 9th and 10th centuries, also moving the capital from Malamocco to Rialto.
	Tradonico	Pietro	Originally from Pula, Istria (in modern Croatia), they came to Rialto via Jesolo.
	Tribuno	Pietro	

=== Old houses ===
The group of Old houses (case vecchie), whose members were called "longhi", has been well defined since the 1350s. In the so-called "pseudo-Giustinian" Chronicle, drawn up at that time, the group is distinguished from the already substantial corpus of patricians of twenty-four (or, better, twenty-five) families more powerful and constantly engaged in Venetian political life. In the Chronicle these patrician houses are divided into two further groups: the first includes the families Badoer, Baseggio, Contarini, Corner, Dandolo, Falier, Giustinian, Gradenigo-Dolfin, Morosini, Michiel, Polani and Sanudo; the second includes the families Barozzi, Belegno (later Bragadin), Bembo, Gauli, Memmo, Querini, Soranzo, Tiepolo, Zane, Zeno, Ziani (later Salamon) and Zorzi.

The author of the paper justifies this situation by listing in detail the deeds performed by their ancestors in the foundation of Venice. Although imaginative, the information contained in the Chronicle served to distinguish an elitist nucleus from the large mass of families included after the Serrata, above all those New houses that during the fifteenth century would contend with the "longhi" for the ducal throne.

It should also be noted that tradition defined twelve "apostolic" families (Contarini, Tiepolo, Morosini, Michiel, Badoer, Sanudo, Gradenigo-Dolfin, Memmo, Falier, Dandolo, Polani and Barozzi) and four other "evangelical" ones (Giustinian, Corner, Bragadin and Bembo); the history of Venice evidently wanted to be compared to that of the Church, founded on the Twelve Apostles and advocated by the Four Evangelists.

The Thirteen
Crest	Name	Notable members	Member portrait
	Badoer	Alvise, Andrea, Giacomo, Giacomo, Giovanni Alberto, Luca, Marino	
	Baseggio	Cesco, Pietro	
	Contarini	Albano, Alvise, Alvise, Ambrogio, Andrea, Bartolomeo, Bartolomeo, Carlo, Cecilia, Domenico I, Domenico II, Enrico, Francesco, Gasparo, Giovanni, Giovanni Matteo, Jacopo, Maddalena, Marino, Nicolò, Piero, Polissena	
	Cornaro	Andrea, Andrea, Andrea, Caterina, Elena, Federico, Federico, Federico, Felicia, Francesco, Francesco, Francesco, Giorgio, Giorgio, Giorgio, Giorgio, Giovanni, Giovanni I, Giovanni II, Laura, Luigi, Luigi, Marco, Marco, Marco, Marco, Marco Antonio, Pietro, Pisana, Vitsentzos	
	Dandolo	Andrea, Andrea, Anna, Emilio, Enrico, Enrico, Enrico, Francesco, Giovanna, Giovanni, Marino, Raniero, Zilia	
	Dolfin	Caterina, Dolfin, Gentile, Giampaolo, Giovanni, Giovanni, Giovanni, Giovanni, Giovanni, Giovanni, Giovanni, Pietro	
	Falier	Marino, Ordelaffo, Vitale	
	Giustinian	Alicia, Giacomo, St. Lawrence, Marcantonio, Marco, Marco, Olimpia, Pantaleone, Paul, Pompeo, Sebastian, Zorzi	
	Gradenigo	Aluycia, Bartolomeo, Bartolomeo, Giovanni, Pietro	
	Morosini	Agostino, Aliodea, Dana, Domenico, Francesco, Giovan Francesco, Giovan Francesco, Bl. John, Lodovico, Marco, Marieta, Marino, Michele, Morosina, Sergio, Thomas, Tomasina	
	Michiel	Domenico, Giovanni, Marcantonio, Vitale I, Vitale II	
	Polani	Giovanni, Pietro	
	Sanudo	Angelo, Cristina, Fiorenza, Fiorenza I, Guglielmazzo, John I, Marco, Marco, Marco I, Marco II, Maria, Marino, Marino, Nicholas I, Nicholas II, William I	

The Twelve
Crest	Name	Notable members	Member portrait
	Barozzi	Andrea I, Andrea II, Angelo, Elena, Francesco, Francesco, Giovanni, Iacopo I, Iacopo II, Pietro	
	Belegno		
	Bembo	Bernardo, Gianfrancesco, Giovanni, Petronilla, Pietro	
	Gaulo	Galla	
	Memmo	Andrea, Marcantonio, Tribuno	
	Querini	Angelo Maria, Elisabetta, Marina, Pietro	
	Soranzo	Giovanni, Vittore	
	Tiepolo	Bajamonte, Giovanni Battista, Giovanni Domenico, Jacopo, Lorenzo, Lorenzo	
	Zane	Lorenzo, Matteo, Paolo	
	Zeno	Antonio, Antonio, Apostolo, Carlo, Giovanni Battista, Nicolò, Nicolò, Pietro, Pietro, Reniero	
	Ziani	Marc'Antonio, Pietro, Pietro Andrea, Sebastiano	
	Zorzi	Alvise, Bertolome, Chiara, Francis, Jacob, Marino, Marino, Marino Giovanni, Nicholas I, Nicholas II, Nicholas III	

Later, the Bragadin replaced the Belegno and the Salamon replaced the Ziani, following the two families' extinctions.

Crest	Name	Notable members	Member portrait
	Bragadin	Marcantonio, Marcantonio, Marcantonio	
	Salamon	Bl. James, Marina	

=== New houses ===
This group includes numerous patrician families who were not part of the Old houses, but were nevertheless very significant, as some became very prominent and important in the politics of the Republic.

==== Ducal houses ====
These are fifteen families of more recent nobility than the "longhi" (their members were called, not surprisingly, "curti"), as underlined by the same "pseudo-Giustinian" Chronicle. From it we learn that only the Barbarigo, the Marcello and the Moro had contributed to the foundation of Rialto by giving tribunes; Foscari, Gritti, Malipiero, Priuli, Trevisan, Tron and Venier are recognized as of non-Venetian origin; of the Donà, of the Grimani and of the Lando there is no information because they are only mentioned, while the Loredan are said to have originated from ancient Rome and were admitted to the Great Council under Doge Reniero Zeno (r. 1253–1268) or two centuries earlier, according to Jacopo Zabarella; finally, the Mocenigo do not even appear.

Crest	Name	Notable members	Member portrait
	Barbarigo	Agostino, Agostino, Angelo, Contarina, Giovanni Francesco, St. Gregorio, Jacomo, Marcantonio, Marco, Marco	
	Donà	Baldassare, Francesco, Leonardo, Nicolò, Pietro	
	Foscari	Francesco, Girolamo, Paolo, Pietro	
	Grimani	Antonio, Domenico, Edmund, Elisabetta, Giovanni, Luigi, Maria Margherita, Marino, Marino, Pietro, Vincenzo	
	Gritti	Alvise, Andrea, Triadan	
	Lando	Pietro	
	Loredan	Alvise, Andrea, Andrea, Antonio, Antonio, Caterina, Fosco, Francesco, Francesco, Giacomo, Giorgio, Giovanni, Giovanni, Giovanni Francesco, Leonardo, Marco, Marco, Marco, Paolina, Pietro, Pietro, Teodoro	
	Malipiero	Domenico, Felicia, Francesco, Gian Francesco, Giovanni, Orio, Pasquale, Riccardo	
	Marcello	Alessandro, Benedetto, Loredana, Lorenzo, Nicolò	
	Mocenigo	Alvise Giovanni, Alvise I, Alvise II, Andrea, Giovanni, Lazzaro, Leonardo, Marco Antonio, Pietro, Sebastiano, Tommaso	
	Mòro	Anton Lazzaro, Cristoforo	
	Priuli	Agostino, Antonio, Antonio Maria, Giovanni, Girolamo, Girolamo, Lorenzo, Lorenzo, Matteo, Matteo, Michele, Marieta Morosina, Pietro	
	Trevisan	Marcantonio, Ludovico, Vittore Benedetto	
	Tron	Nicolò, Nicolò	
	Venier	Andrea, Antonio, Cecilia, Francesco, Giacopo Antonio, Lydia, Mara, Marco, Marco, Marie, Pietro, Sebastiano, Zuan Francesco	

The Vendramin family can also be counted among the ducal families who, despite having been aggregated only in 1381 after the War of Chioggia, managed to elect the doge Andrea Vendramin not even a century later.

Crest	Name	Notable members	Member portrait
	Vendramin	Andrea, Francesco	

==== Others ====
Some other families considered part of the Case nuove include:

Crest	Name	Notable members
	Abramo	
	Agnusdio	
	Amizzo	
	Armer	
	Arimondo	
	Avanzago	
	Baffo	Franceschina, Giorgio Alvise
	Balbi	Adriano, Gasparo, Girolamo, Ludovico, Teodoro
	Barbaro	Antonio, Cornelia, Daniele, Donato, Ermolao, Ermolao, Ermolao, Federico, Francesco, Francesco, Giosafat, Marcantonio, Marco, Nicolò, Zaccaria
	Barbo	Giovanni, Ludovico, Marco, Pantaleone, Pope Paul II
	Benedetti	Giambattista
	Bernardo	
	Bollani	Domenico
	Boldù	
	Bon	Filippo, Laura
	Bodulmier	
	Briani	
	Calbo	
	Canal	Fabio, Giovanni Battista
	Cappello	Andrea, Antonio, Bernardo, Bianca, Girolamo, Vettore, Vincenzo
	Caravello	
	Celsi	Lorenzo, Lorenzo
	Civran	Giuseppe
	Cocco	
	Correr	Antonio, Antonio, Francesco Antonio, Gregorio, Pope Gregory XII, Pietro, Pietro, Teodoro
	Da Mosto	Alvise, Francesco
	Da Mula	Marco Antonio, Polissena
	Da Ponte	Antonio, Lorenzo, Nicolò
	Da Riva	
	Diedo	Antonio, Marcantonio
	Duodo	Arsenio
	Emo	Angelo, Giovanni
	Erizzo	Francesco
	Foscarini	Antonio, Giovanni Paolo, Marco, Michele, Giacomo
	Foscolo	Leonardo, Nikolaos, Ugo
	Fradello	
	Gabrielli	Cante, Cecciolo, Domenico, Giovanni, Giovanni Maria, Giulio, Giulio, Luigi, Nicolò, Pompeo
	Ghisi	Agnese, Andrea, Bartholomew I, Bartholomew II, George I, George II, Geremia
	Giusti	Agostino, Alvise, Girolamo
	Grioni	
	Gussoni	
	Magno	Stefano
	Manolesso	Emilio Maria
	Marin	
	Mengolo	
	Miani	St. Gerolamo, Giovanni, Hieronimo, Valeria
	Minio	Bartolomeo, Domenico
	Minotto	
	Molin	Alvise, Biagio, Francesco, Giovanni, Nicolò, Raffaele
	Muazzo	
	Nadal	Pietro
	Nani	
	Navagèr	Andrea, Bernardo
	Orio	
	Pasqualigo	Lorenzo, Luigi, Nicolò
	Pesaro	Giovanni
	Pisani	Alvise, Andrea, Carlo, Domenico, Francesco, Francesco, Luigi, Niccolò, Vettor
	Pizzamano	
	Premarin	
	Sagredo	Caterina, Giovanni Francesco, Nicolò
	Selvo	Domenico
	Semitecolo	Niccolò
	Steno	Michele
	Storladi	
	Stornello	
	Surian	
	Valaresso	
	Valier	Agostino, Bertuccio, Silvestro
	Vitturi	
	Zancaruol	
	Zantani	
	Zulian	Girolamo, Polo

Families which can be added to these include the Albizzo, Basadonna, Coppo, dalle Boccole, da Lezze, d'Arduin, Fabriciacio, Galanti, Gambarin, Lanzuoli, Lombardo, Mazaman, Miegano, Mussolino, Navigroso, Sesendillo, Signolo, Viaro, Vielmo, Volpe, Zaguri, and the Zancani.

To these were added in 1298 some Venetian families which, at the time of the Serrata, were in the East, notably in Constantinople:

Crest	Name	Notable members
	Acotanto	
	Bonomo	Bl. Giovanna Maria, Jacobello, Pietro
	Mastalizi	
	Ruzzini	Carlo

Other families added in 1298 include the Costantino, Donadi, Marcipian, Massoli, Ruzier, Stanieri, Tolonigo, and the Tonisto.

The remainder came from Acre and were added in 1303. These include the Barison, Benedetti (another branch), Bondulmier (another branch), Lion, Marmora, Molin (the Molin d'Oro branch) and the Surian (another branch). All but the Lion and the Surian appear to have attended the Council sometime before the Serrata.

Then there were fifteen families descended from citizens who had distinguished themselves in the repression of the Tiepolo conspiracy in 1310, some of which include:

Crest	Name	Notable members
	Agadi	
	Caotorta	
	Quintavalle	Antonio

Other families added in 1310 include the Addoldo, Agrinal, Buoninsegna, Caroso, Diente, Diesello, Ferro, Grisoni, Mengolo (another branch), Papaciza, Sesendillo (another branch), and the Vidor.

=== Newest houses ===
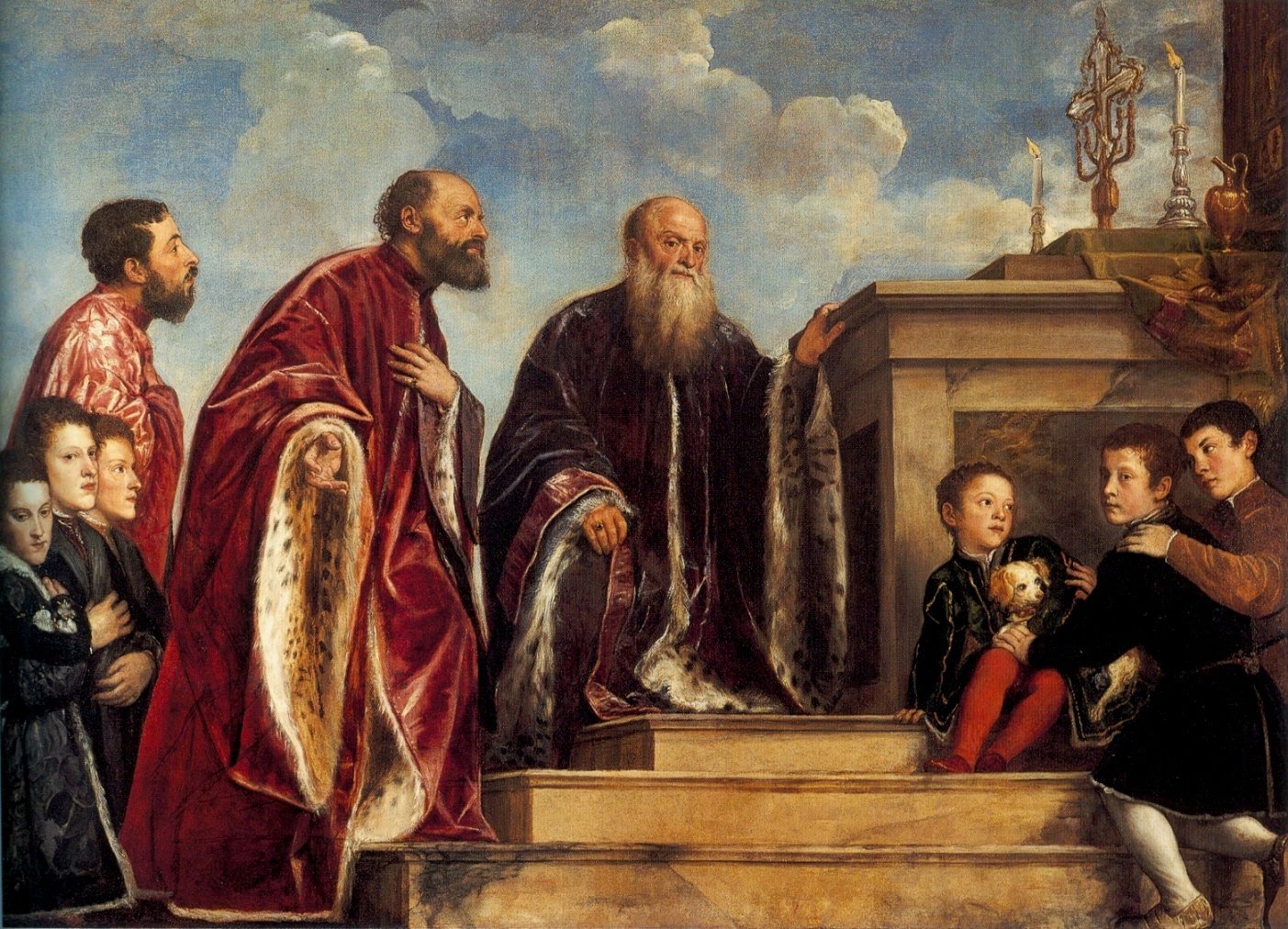
Members of the Vendramin Family Venerating a Relic of the True Cross, by Titian and workshop, mid-1540s, National Gallery, London. The sitters are Gabriel Vendramin (1484 - 1552), collector of works of art, his brother, Andrea Vendramin (1481 - 1547), and the latter's seven sons. The reliquary of the True Cross on the altar that their great-great-grandfather, an earlier Andrea Vendramin, had received on behalf of the Scuola Grande di San Giovanni Evangelista in 1369, still exists.

At the turn of the fourteenth century, the War of Chioggia brought the Venetian economy to its knees. The Genoese fleet, deployed at the entrance to the Lagoon, had blocked all forms of commercial exchange and thus the revenue in terms of import duties.

In 1379 the Venetian government decreed the granting of entry into the Patriciate to the thirty commoners who had contributed most in any way to the war effort. Many flocked to it, some making their servants, their children or themselves available, some keeping a group of soldiers, some arming galleys, some simply giving money. After the conflict, on 4 September 1381 the Senate elected the winners from a shortlist of sixty-two candidates (for a total of fifty-eight families). It is difficult to establish on the basis of which criterion this choice was made: many of the rejected had participated in the war effort with conspicuous offers, conversely there were those who were admitted with a very modest contribution. Evidently other factors weighed on them, including the marriage strategies that had allowed many non-nobles to create solid ties with the "old houses" of the aristocracy.

In the list there are eleven candidates with the same surname to that of families already present in the Patriciate, and they can be presumed to belong to undocumented or illegitimate branches of those families.

Crest	Name
	Giorgio Calergi
	Rafaino Carissimi
	Giacomo Cavalli
	Marco Cicogna
	Giacomo Condulmer
	Giovanni d'Arduin
	Antonio d'Arduin
	Alvise dalle Fornase
	Giovanni Garzoni
	Nicolò Garzoni
	Francesco Girardi
	Pietro Lippomano
	Nicolò Longo
	Francesco da Mezzo
	Paolo Nani
	Giovanni Negro
	Marco Orso
	Bartolomeo Paruta
	Marco Pasqualigo
	Pietro Penzini
	Nicolò Polo
	Donato da Porto
	Nicolò Renier
	Marco Storladi
	Nicolò Tagliapietra
	Giacomo Trevisan
	Paolo Trevisan
	Andrea Vendramin
	Giacomo Vizzamano
	Pietro Zaccaria
	Andrea Zusto

=== Non-Venetian patricians ===
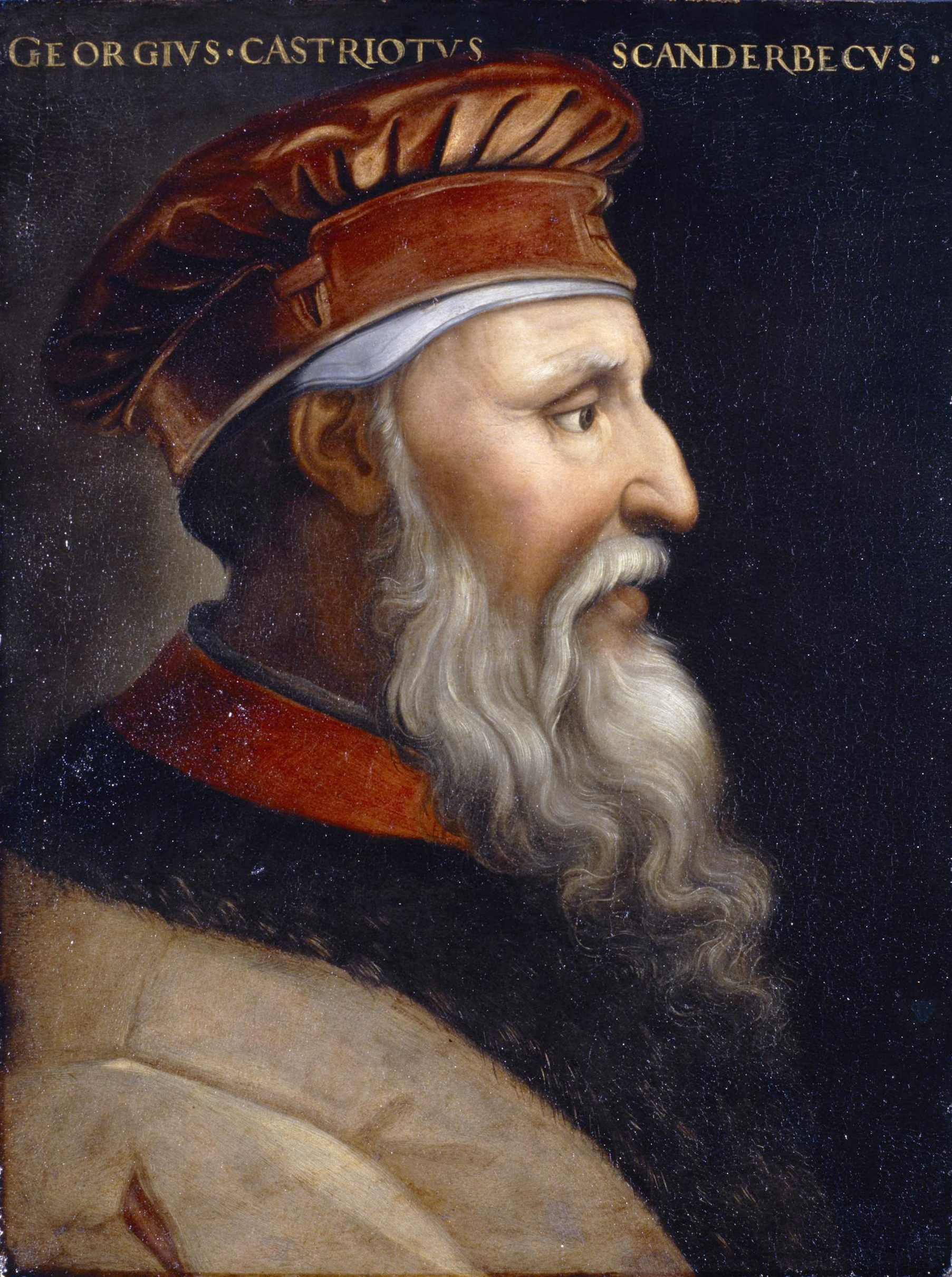
Portrait of Gjergj Kastrioti Skanderbeg, by Cristofano dell'Altissimo, 1550s, Uffizi Gallery, Florence. A member of the Kastrioti family, Skanderbeg was an Albanian feudal lord and military commander who led a rebellion against the Ottoman Empire from 1443 to 1468.

Some time after the Serrata, the Patriciate was also conferred on those families of the mainland who had given military support to the Republic on various occasions. There are thirty-one families in all, but many never participated in Venetian politics, maintaining a merely honorific title.

Crest	Name	Origin	Added
	Anguissola	Piacenza	1499
	Avogadro	Brescia	1437
	Battagia	Milan	1439
	Bentivoglio	Bologna	1488
	Benzon	Crema	1407
	Castriota	Albania	1445
	Cernovicchi	Albania	1474
	Codognola	Milan	1446
	Collalto	Treviso	1306
	Colleoni	Bergamo	1450
	Comino	Albania	1464
	Cossazza	Albania	1430
	Este	Este; Ferrara; Modena	1097
	Gonzaga	Mantua	1332
	Malatesta	Rimini	1480
	Martinengo	Brescia	1448
	Meli Lupi	Cremona	1505
	Pallavicino	Parma	1423
	Passi de Preposulo	Bergamo	1743
	Protti	Vicenza	1404
	Riario	Forlì	1481
	Rossi	Parma	1423
	della Rovere	Savona	1473
	Savelli	Rome	1404
	Savorgnan	Friuli	1385
	Spadafora	Sicily	1404
	Terzi	Parma	1407
	dal Verme	Verona	1388
	Zaccaria de Damalà	Genoa/Chios	c. 1410/1675

=== Houses made for money ===
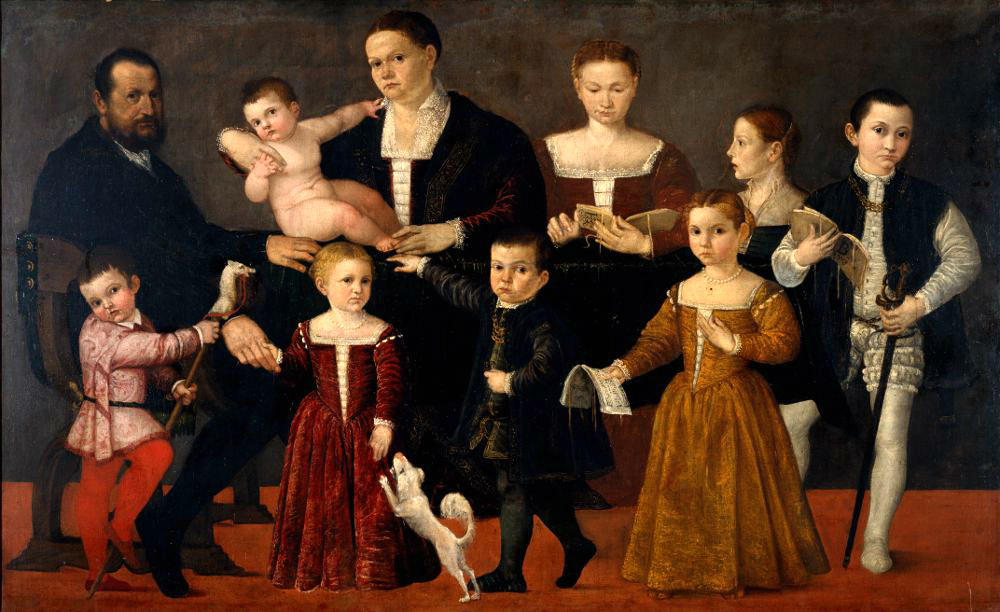
Portrait of the Valmarana family, by Giovanni Antonio Fasolo, Villa Valmarana ai Nani, Vicenza. The family of Gianalvise Valmarana, portrayed with his wife Isabella Nogarola and eight of their twelve children. In 1659 the Valmarana family led by the brothers Triffone, Stefano and Benedetto was given Venetian patrician status after they paid 100,000 ducats to help fund the Cretan War.

Having become almost inaccessible for centuries, the noble body resumed opening up to new families when, with the decline of Venetian power, the State began to "sell" the title (for 100,000 ducats) to fill the public coffers, no longer supported by profitable trade with the East. Between the seventeenth and eighteenth centuries there were three openings to the aristocracy, with the aggregation of one hundred and thirty-four families such as the Medicis and the Gherardinis, (a not inconsiderable contribution, given that the nobility had been suffering from a serious demographic crisis for some time). Some of these families had already been making history in the Venetian hinterland for centuries, and their titles sometimes dated back to the Holy Roman Empire (such as the Brandolini, the Martinengo, the Piovene, the Spineda, the Valmarana). Others were bourgeoisie families enriched through trade (Benzon di San Vidal, Lin, Zanardi).

== Barnabotti ==
A particular category of patricians was constituted by the fallen nobles, called Barnabotti, who, having dissipated the family wealth, still maintained their right to vote in the Great Council. They were a class of impoverished nobility whose name is derived from the fact that the group met and lived in the zone of the Campo San Barnaba (the area, being distant from the city centre, attracted lower rents). Towards the end of the Republic they often represented the tip of the balance between the political factions of the council, influencing it through the trading of their votes to which they were often dedicated, usually selling them in the Orchard of Saint Mark.

During the eighteenth century the Venetian political system underwent a sclerosis. The aristocracy in the fifteenth and sixteenth centuries was very numerous; a high birth rate among the nobility, combined with the mercantile (and merchant-entrepreneur) profession undertaken by a large part of this class, involved a broad aristocratic government with varied interests, in which the poor nobles were a minority. There were, however, numerous events of social mobility within the class, brought about by the rapid enrichments in trade with the East and by the new factories set up in the Lagoon. During the seventeenth and eighteenth centuries the economic situation worsened, more and more after 1618, and the Venetian aristocracy was increasingly dependent on their properties in the mainland and in the colonies, as well as on public sinecures. In Europe the idea spread that trade and industry were unworthy of the aristocracy, an idea rejected by the Venetian aristocracy, but which nevertheless changed the mentality of the nobility. The wars against the Ottomans of the mid- and late-1600s decreased trade with the East for many years, as well as in the early 1700s, ruining other merchant families or those who had not been able to diversify their investments in land and real estate. Few families changed their economic status considerably and rapidly upward, allowing an increasingly small group of families to maintain a relatively large wealth, while many others were constantly losing their position, often without even the money to decently live on.

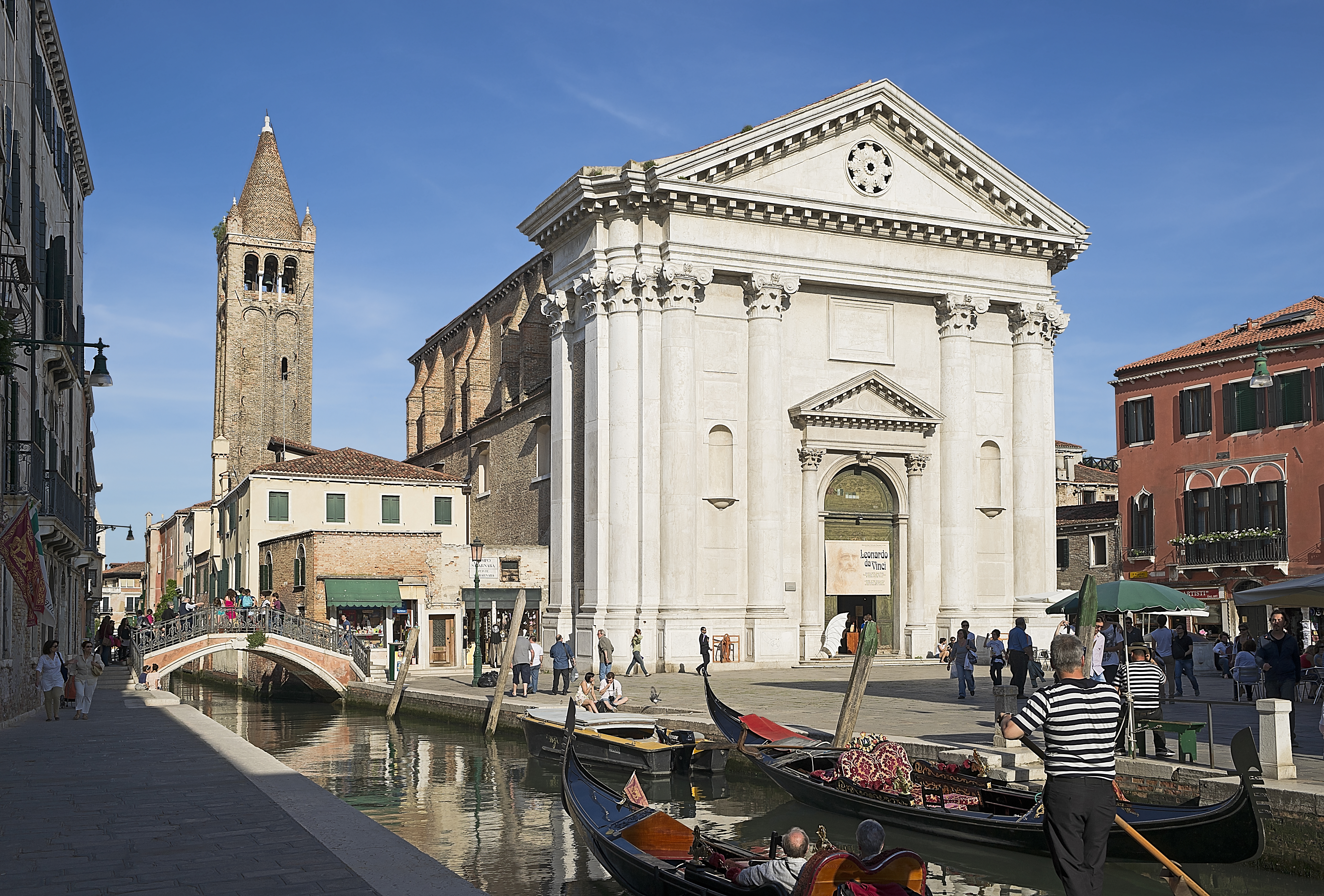
Church of San Barnaba, Venice

This made the Barnabotti an evident phenomenon of Venetian society, while a reflection began on how to change forms of government. In fact, a group, the oligarchs, consisting of the richest families, managed, even by corrupting the poorest nobles, to exclude the middle and poor who were not at their service. The Venetian government, through the Council of Ten and the state inquisitors, however, prevented reforms of any kind (also because these bodies were in the hands of the oligarchy that was taking over the state, to its exclusive advantage). Attempts at reform were tried, but never implemented, in particular during the reign of Francesco Loredan, when Angelo Querini in 1761 tried to restore power to the more collegial organs of the Venetian aristocracy, while in the late 1770s Giorgio Pisani and Carlo Contarini, through the formation of a sort of "noble party", attempted an overall reform. At the center of their proposals there was precisely the social and political recovery of the poorest parts of the Venetian nobility, done through the assignment of dowries to the young patricians, especially the poor ones, increase in the salaries of the Forty and other Colleges, granting of donations for some prestigious political positions (previously free and then monopolised by rich nobles), setting a uniform for the nobles in order to distinguish them from the commoners, etc. In practice, they advocated for the creation of a "political" aristocracy and service, collectively capable of governing the city and the empire. Then there were some issues arising with the new Enlightenment ideas, such as opposition to internal espionage (which was very common in Venice), freedom of speech, defence and resumption of trade, etc. Precisely this attempt at a "noble reaction", not without populist maneuvers in favour of the Barnabotti, was crushed by the spies of the inquisitors, who, well informed, accused the two of having bought electoral votes from some Barnabottis, and also accused them of conspiring. They imprisoned Contarini in Cattaro (where he died, perhaps poisoned) and Pisani in Vicenza. When the French and the Jacobins arrived, Pisani tried to legitimise himself as an opponent of the despotism of the state inquisitors, of which he had been a victim, but, recognized for what he was, namely an aristocrat who had tried to modernise the structures of the Republic of Venice, however still remaining within the nobility, and indeed strengthening its aristocratic character, the new rulers marginalised it.

== Residences ==
=== Palaces ===
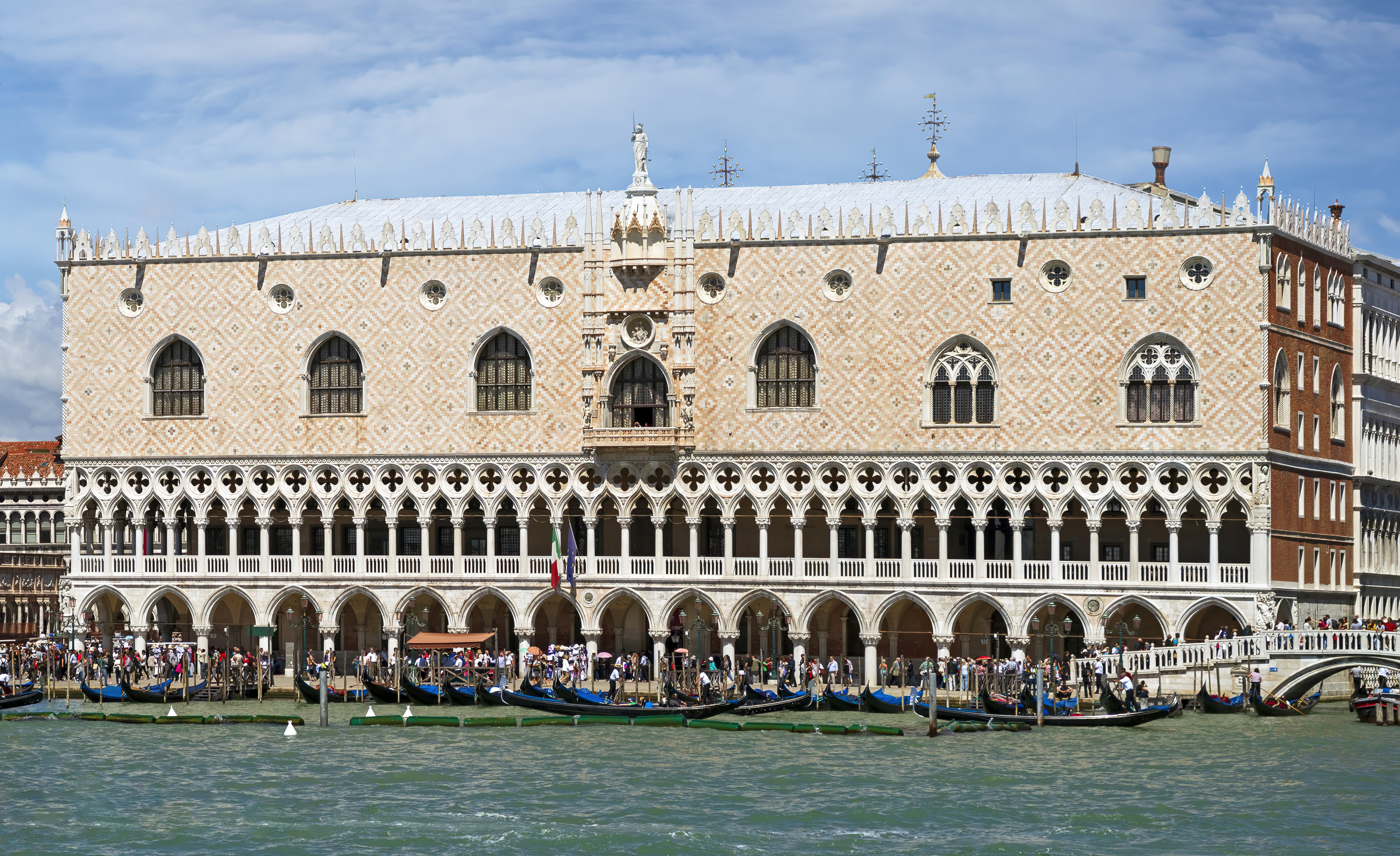
The Doge's Palace, residence of the Doge and seat of the Venetian government.

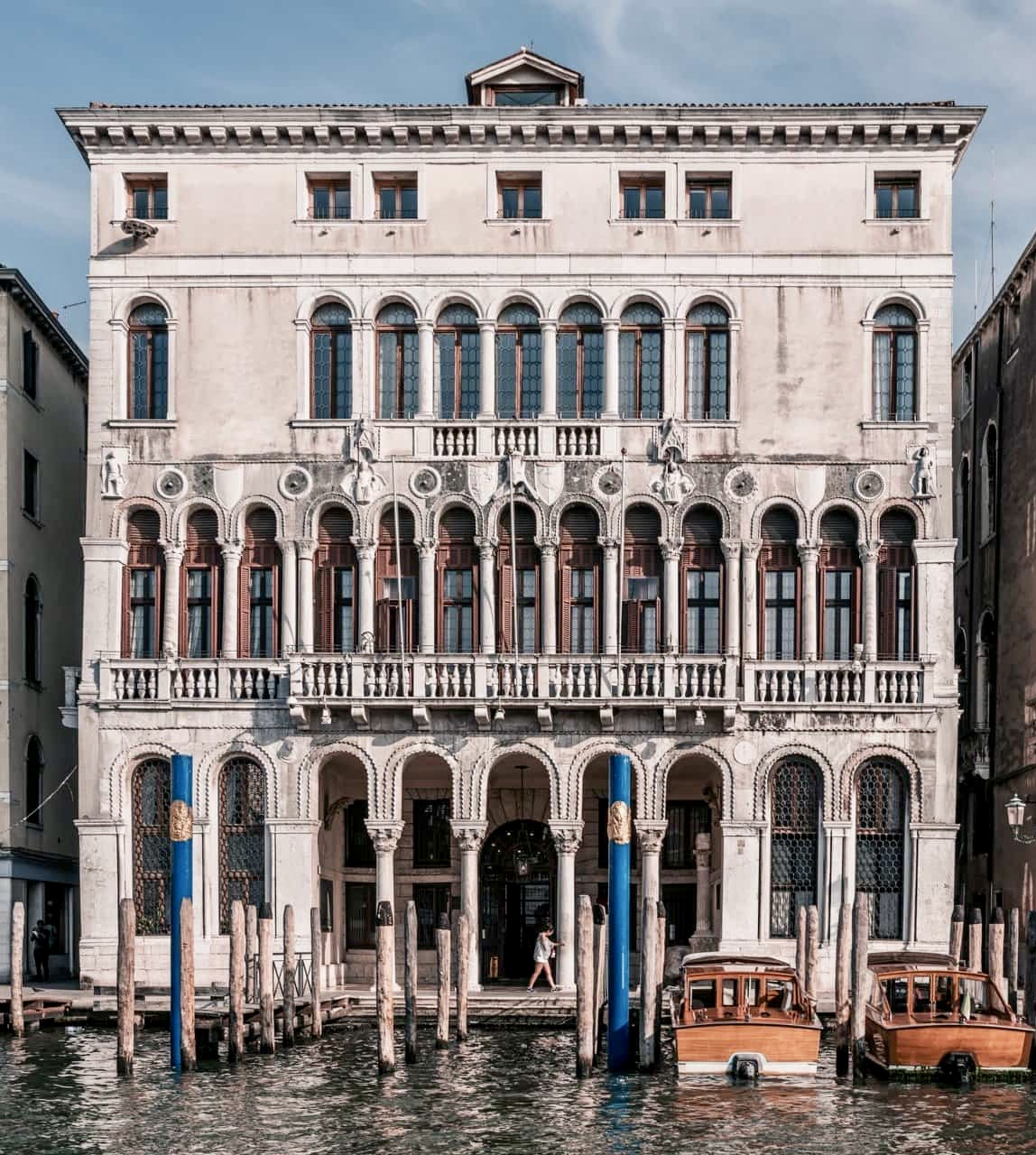
Ca' Loredan, a 13th-century palace, is today the city hall.

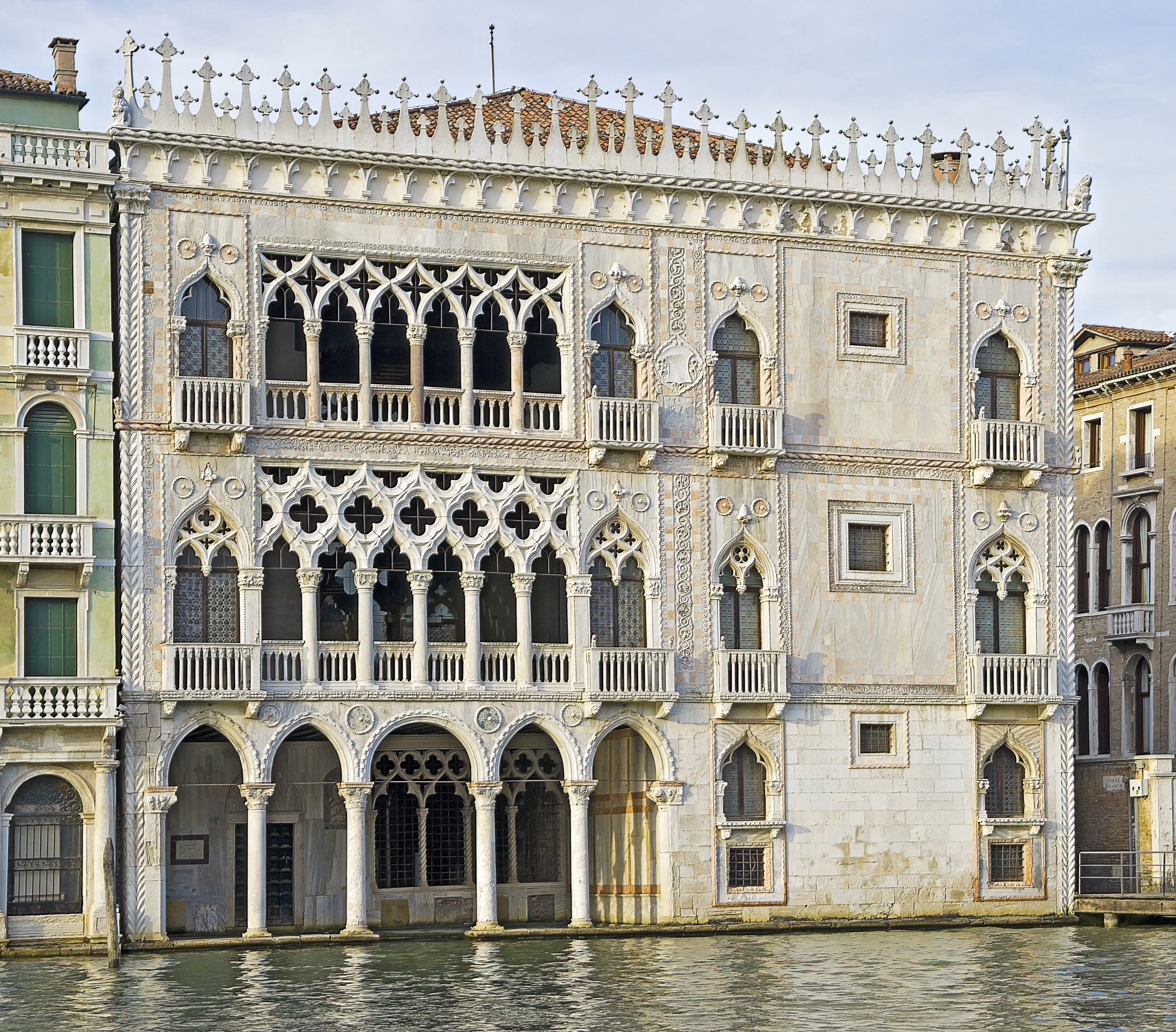
Ca' d'Oro, meaning House of Gold, built for the Contarini family in 1428.

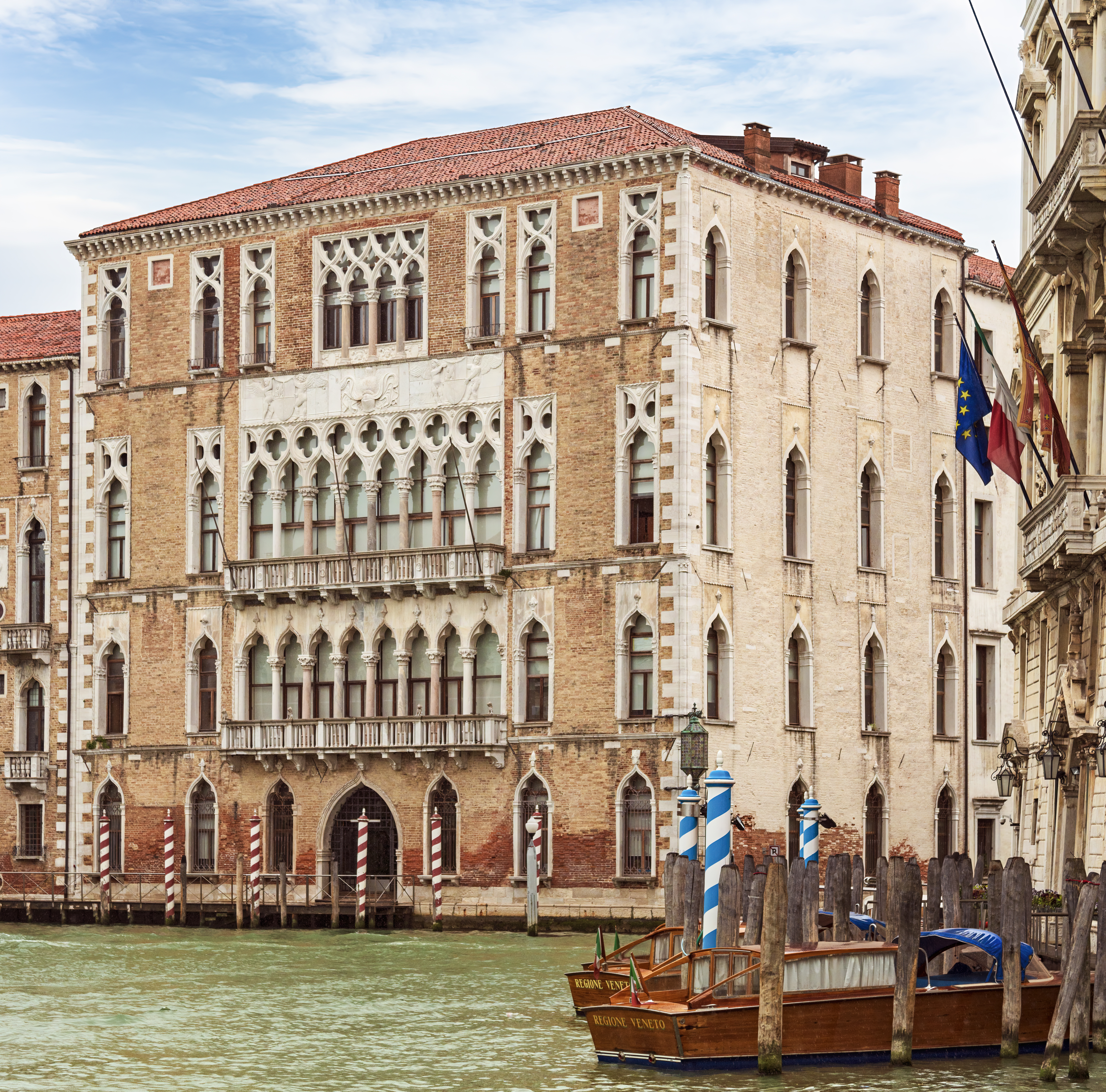
Ca' Foscari, today the seat of the Ca' Foscari University of Venice.

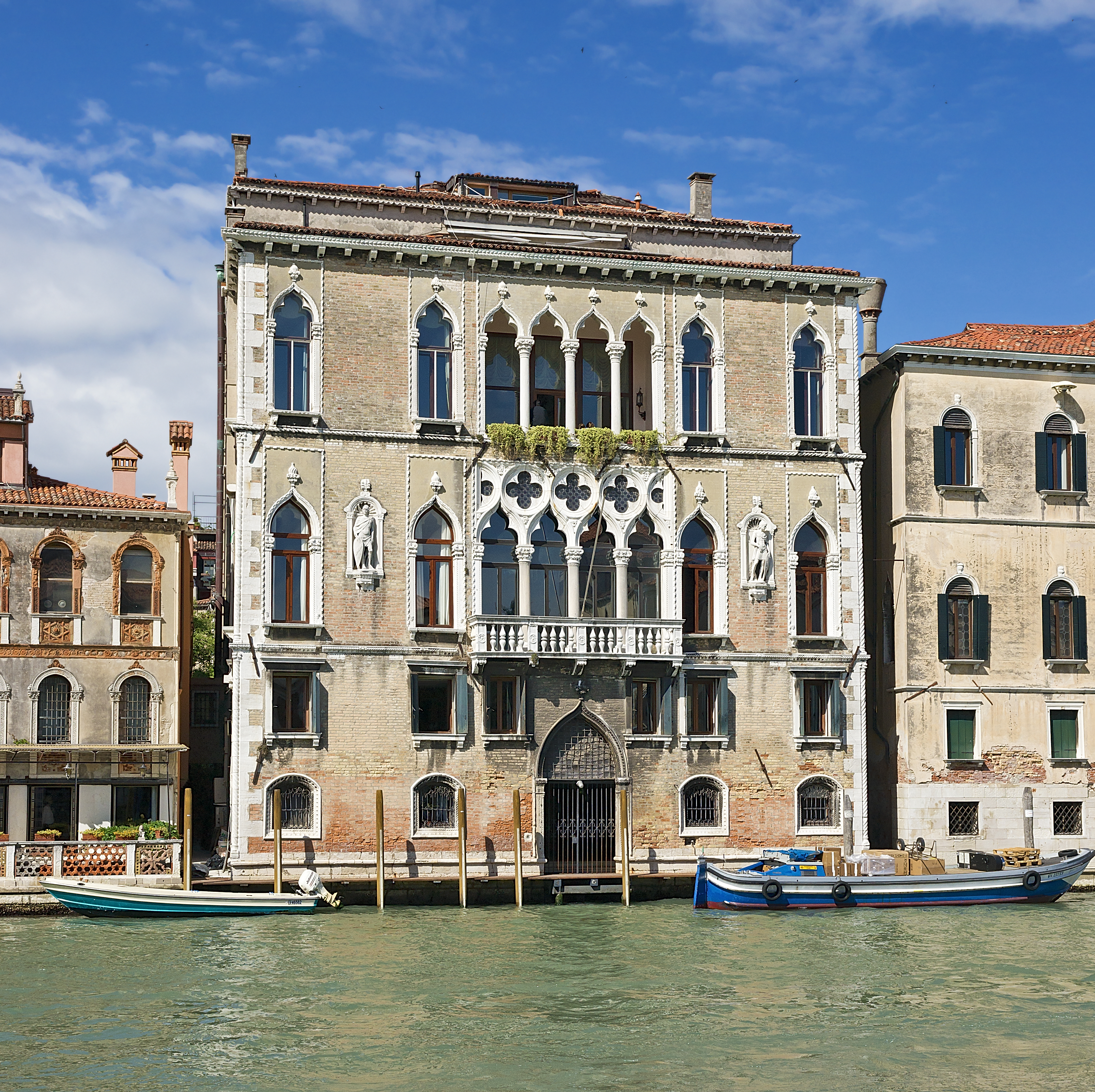
Palazzo Loredan dell'Ambasciatore, offered as a residence to ambassadors of the HRE by Francesco Loredan.

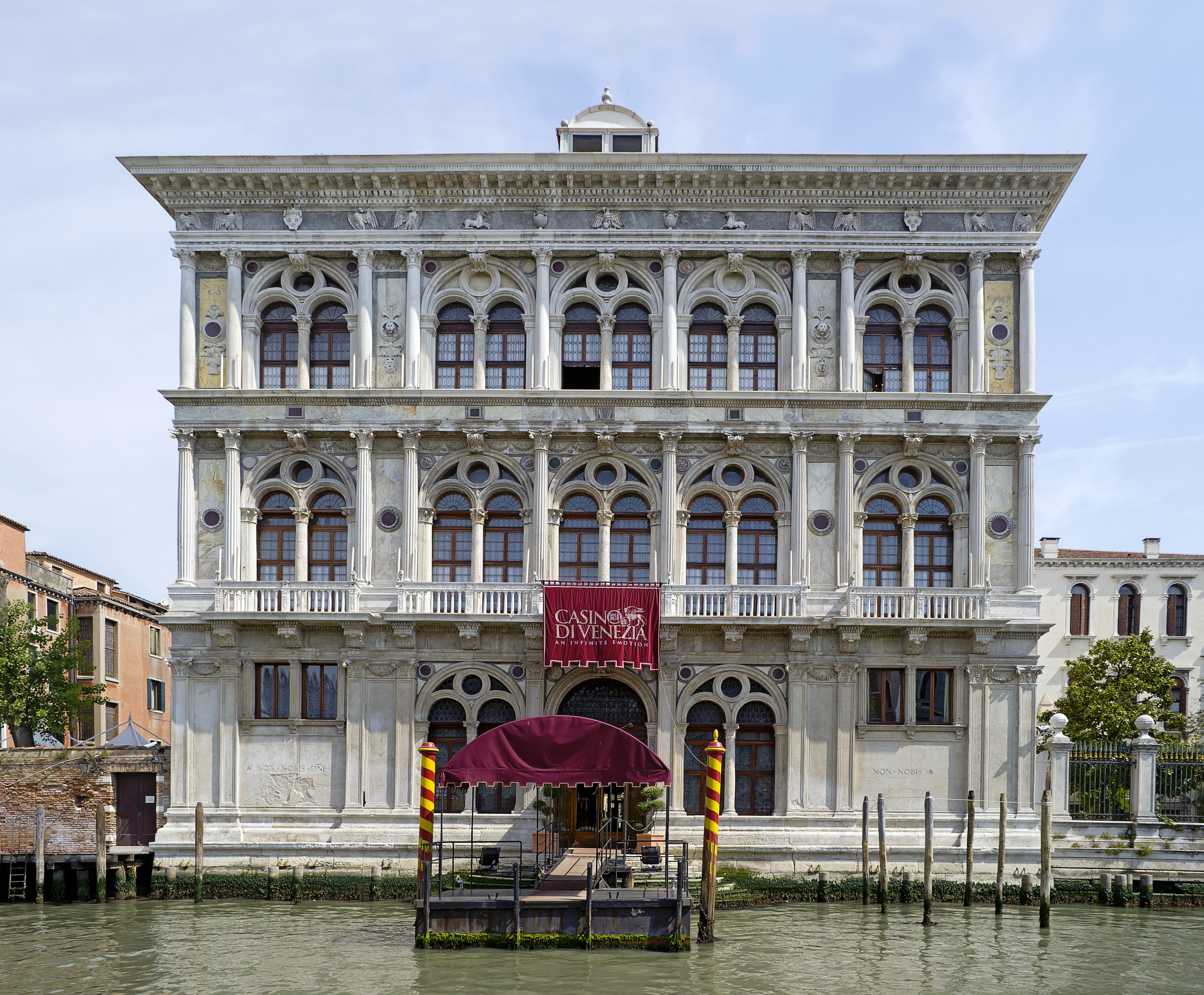
Ca' Vendramin Calergi, built for Andrea Loredan in 1481.

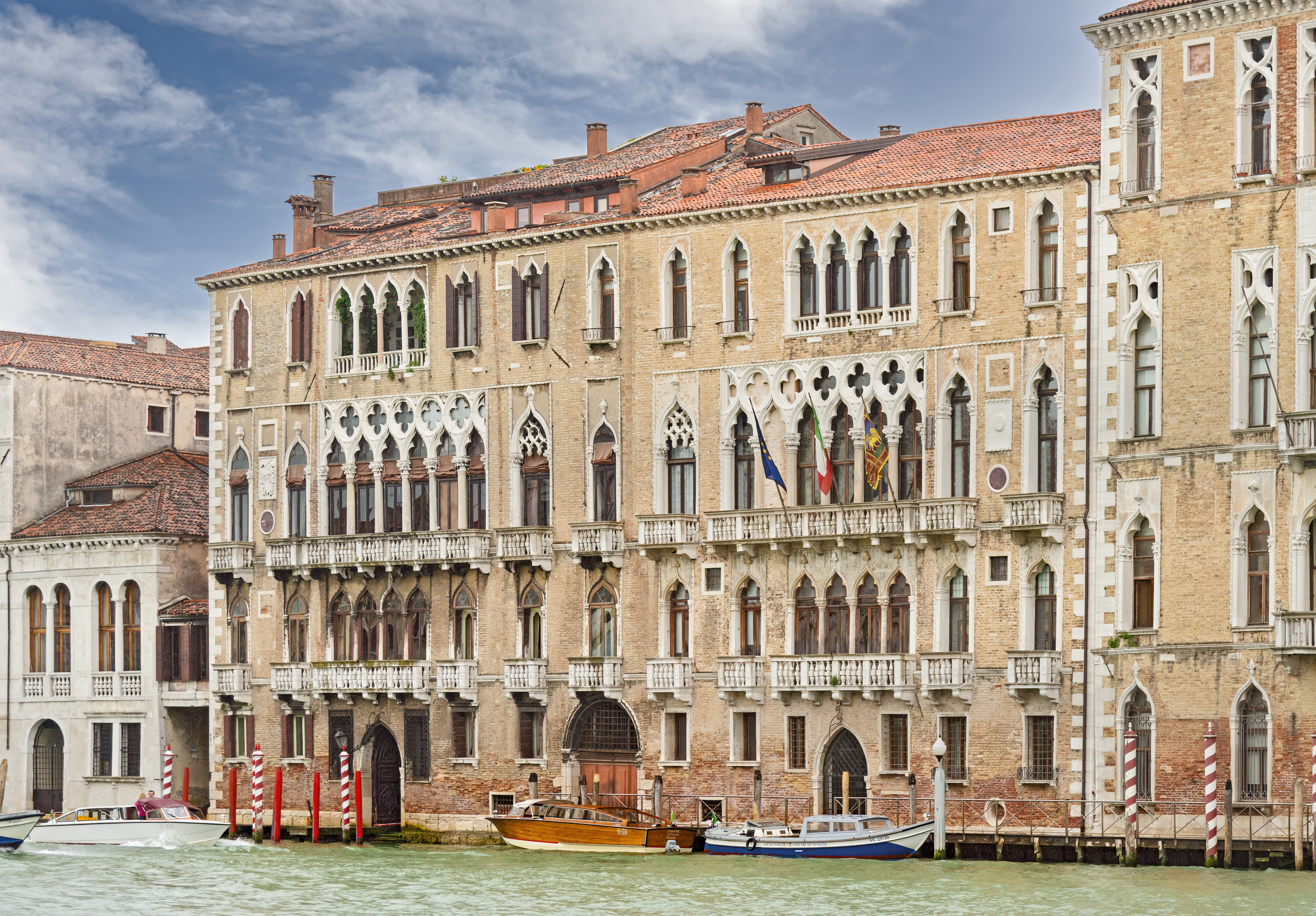
Palazzo Giustinian, one of the best examples of the late Venetian Gothic.

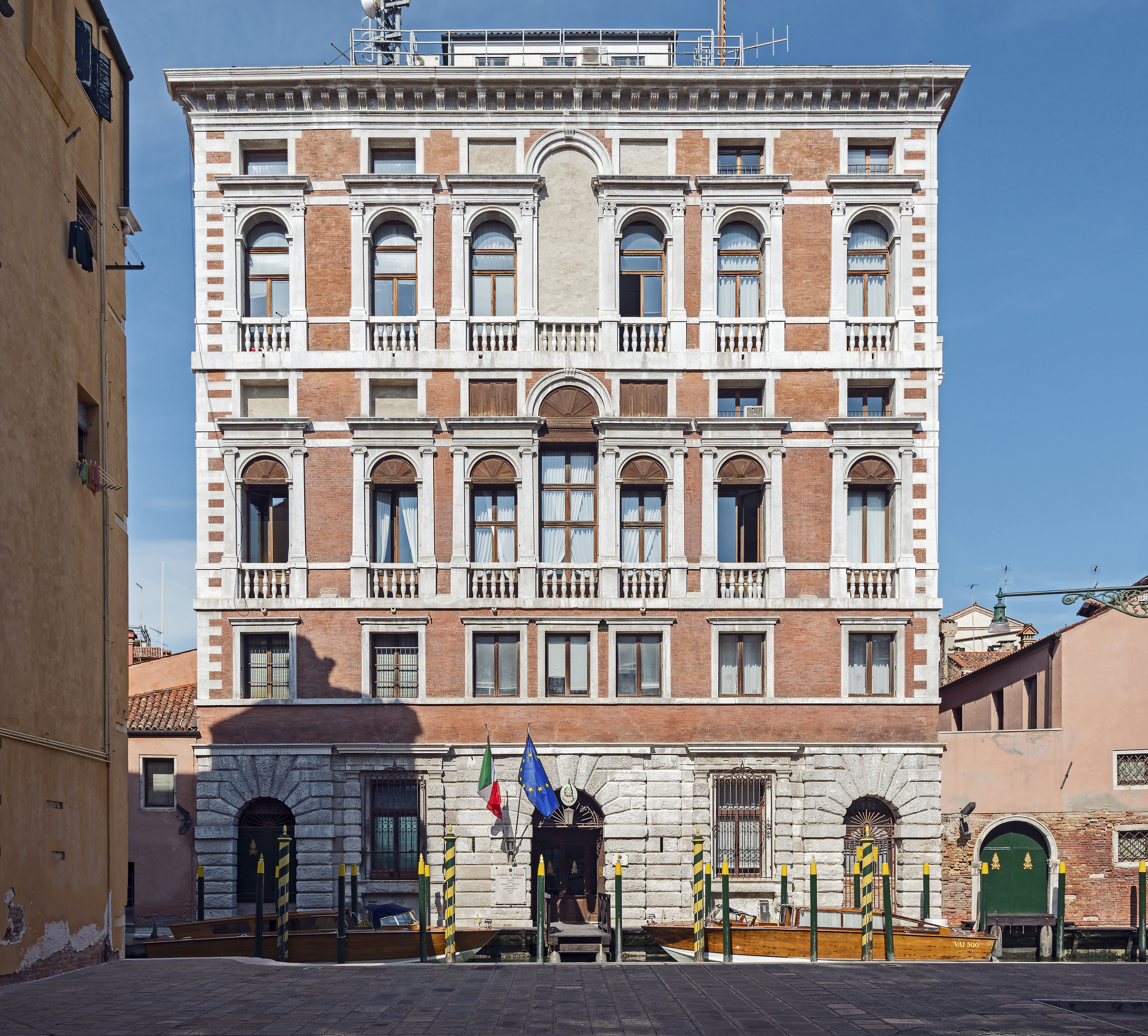
Palazzo Corner Mocenigo, located at Campo San Polo.

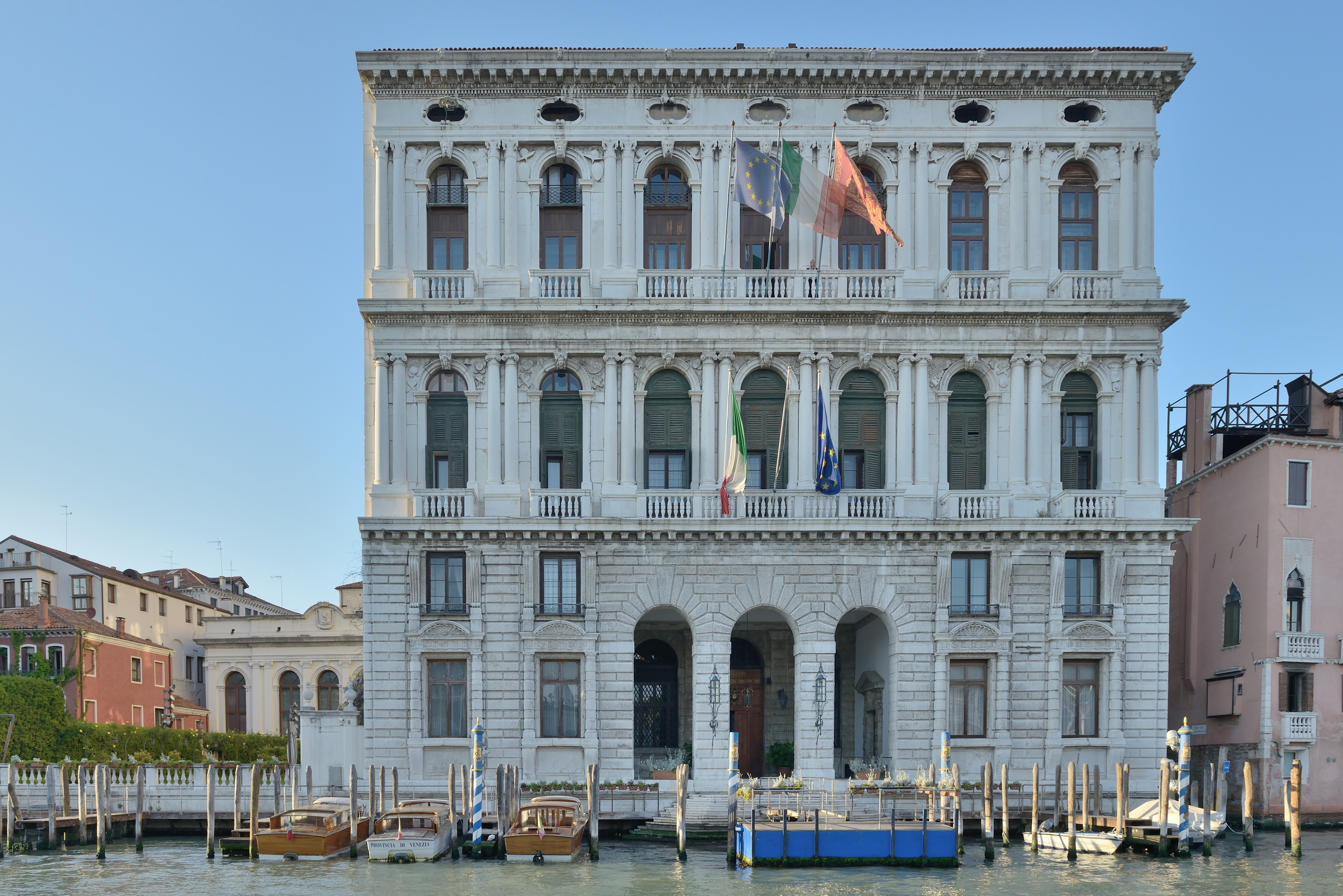
Palazzo Corner della Ca' Grande, designed by Jacopo Sansovino.

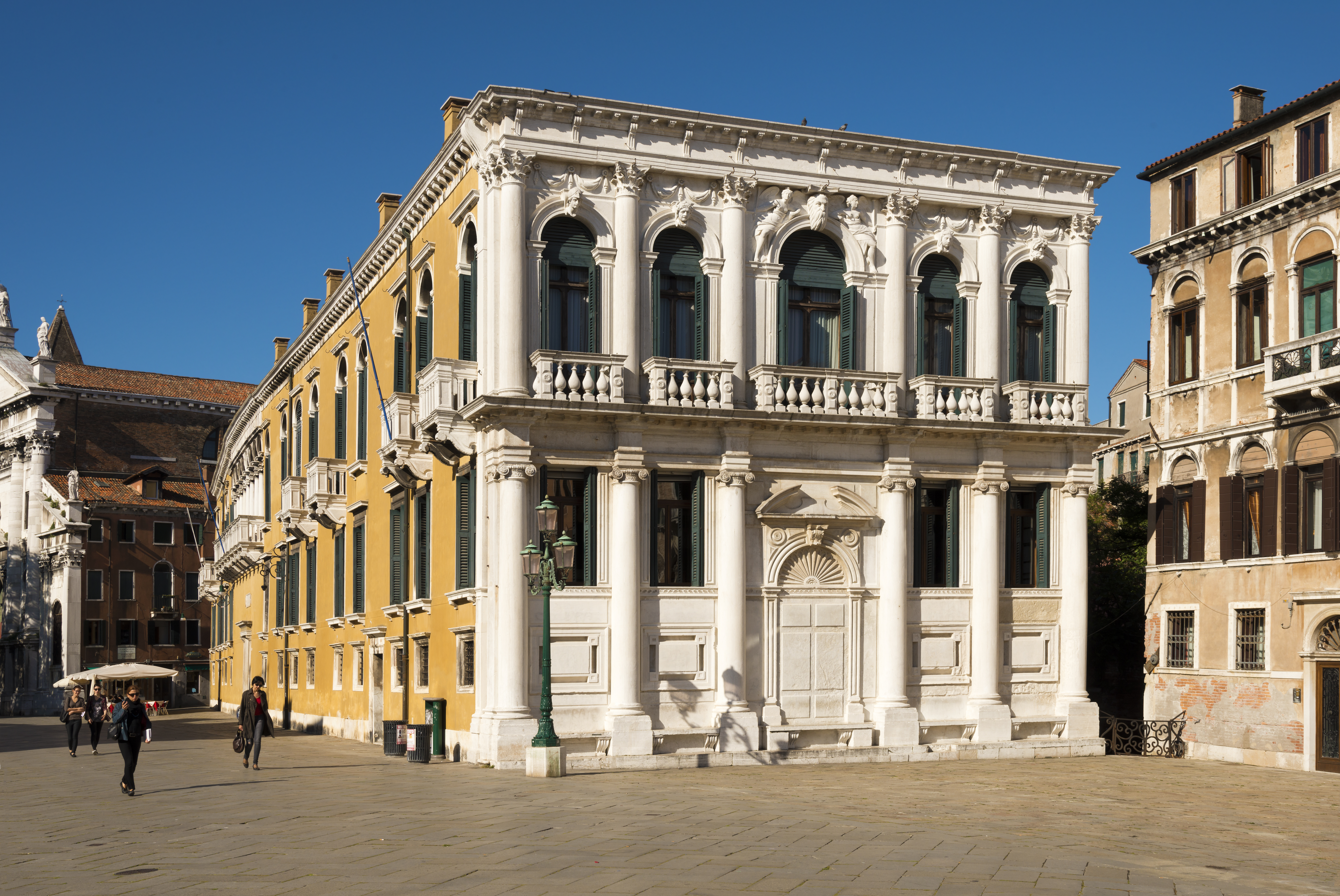
Palazzo Loredan in Campo Santo Stefano, today the seat of a cultural institute.

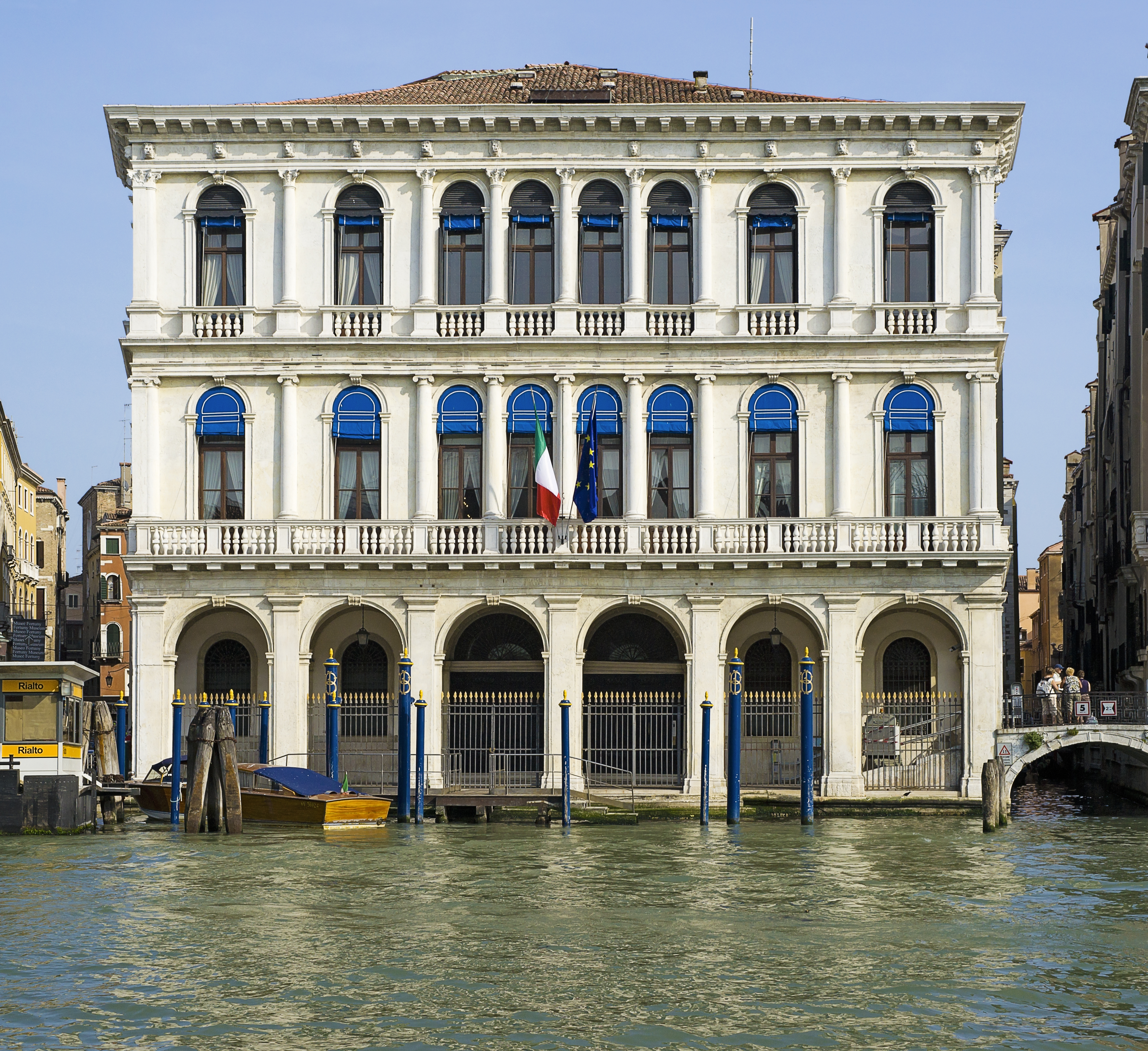
Palazzo Dolfin Manin, built in the 16th century.

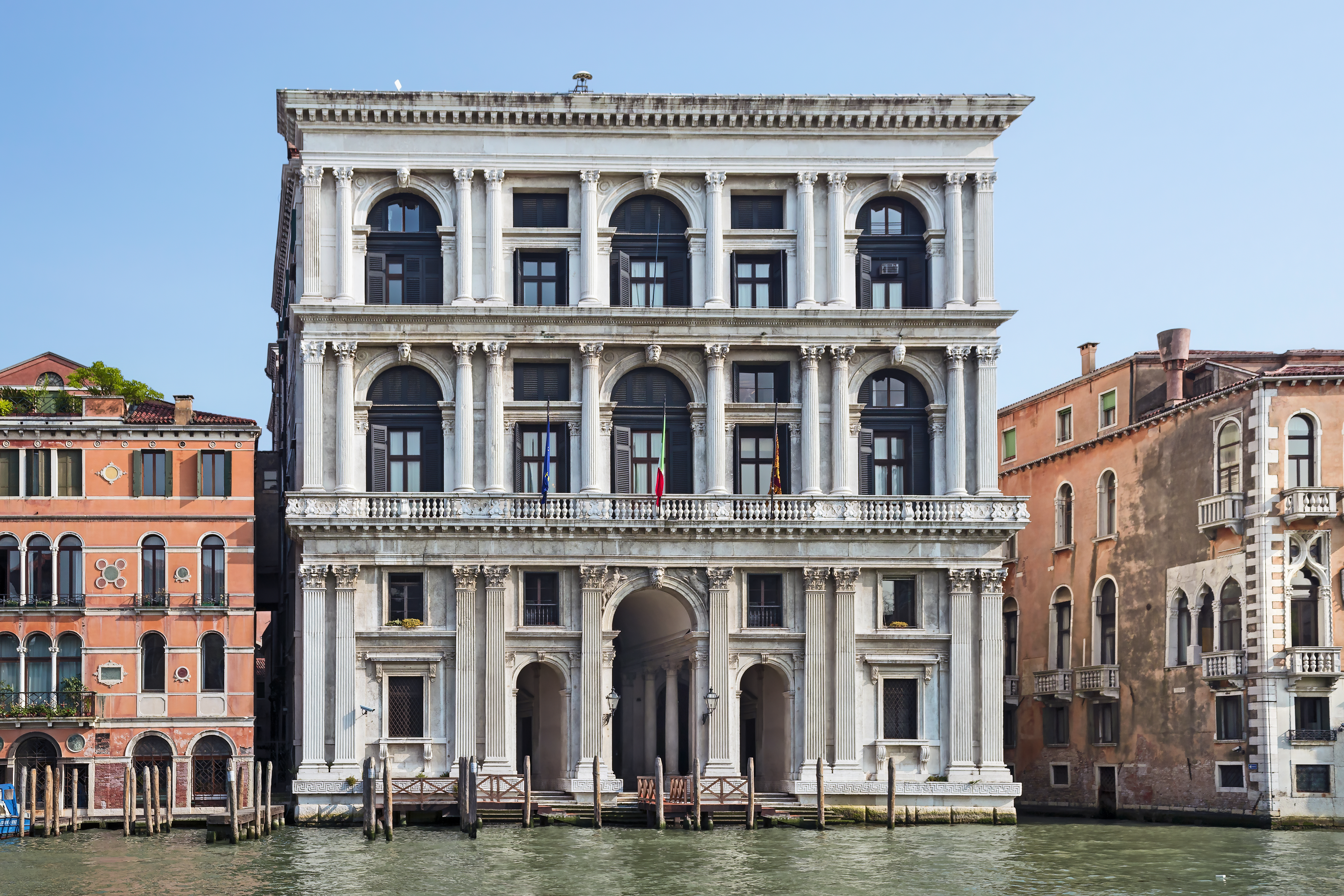
Palazzo Grimani di San Luca, built in the mid-16th century.

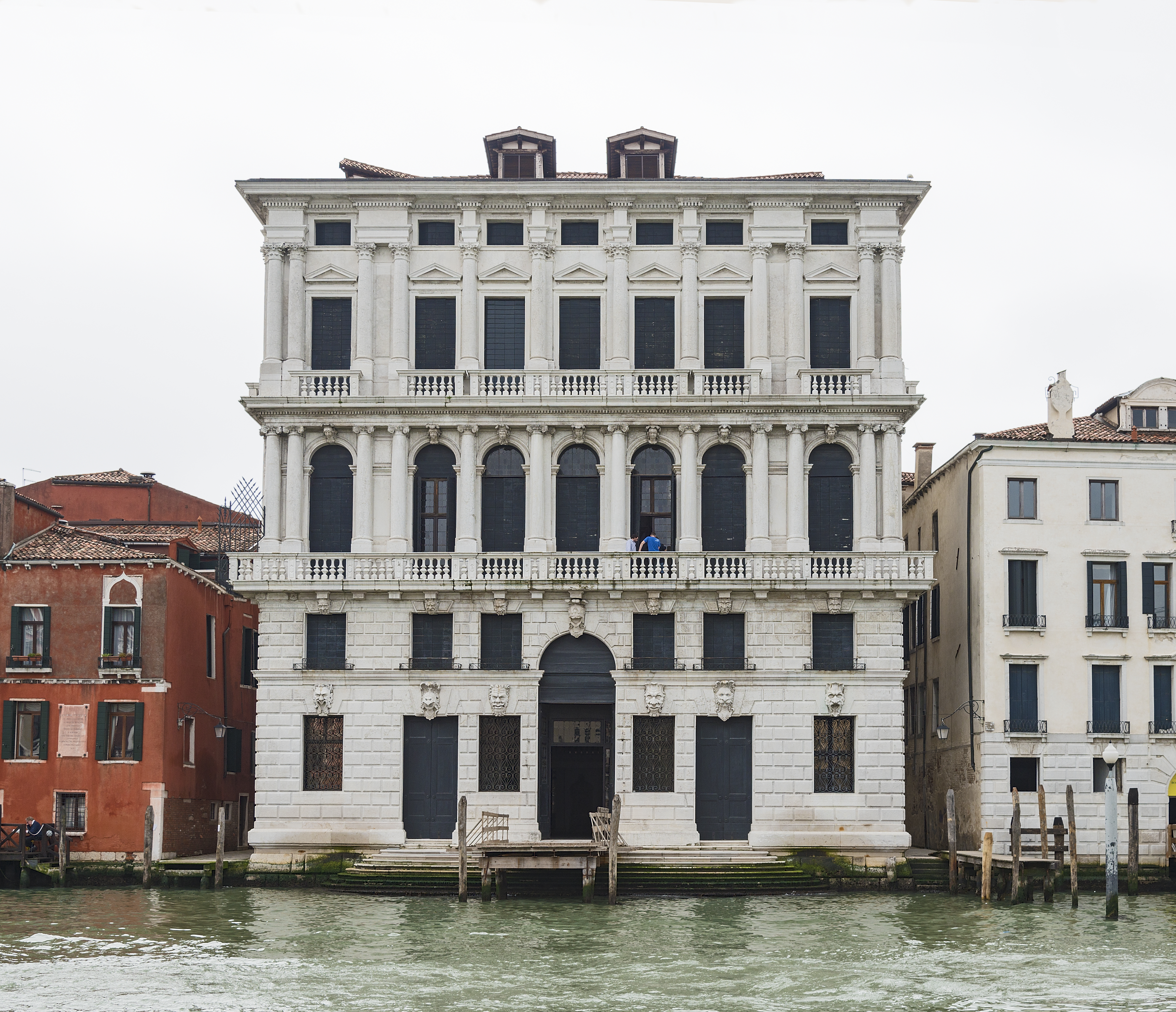
Ca' Corner della Regina, built on the site of birth of Catherine Cornaro, Queen of Cyprus.

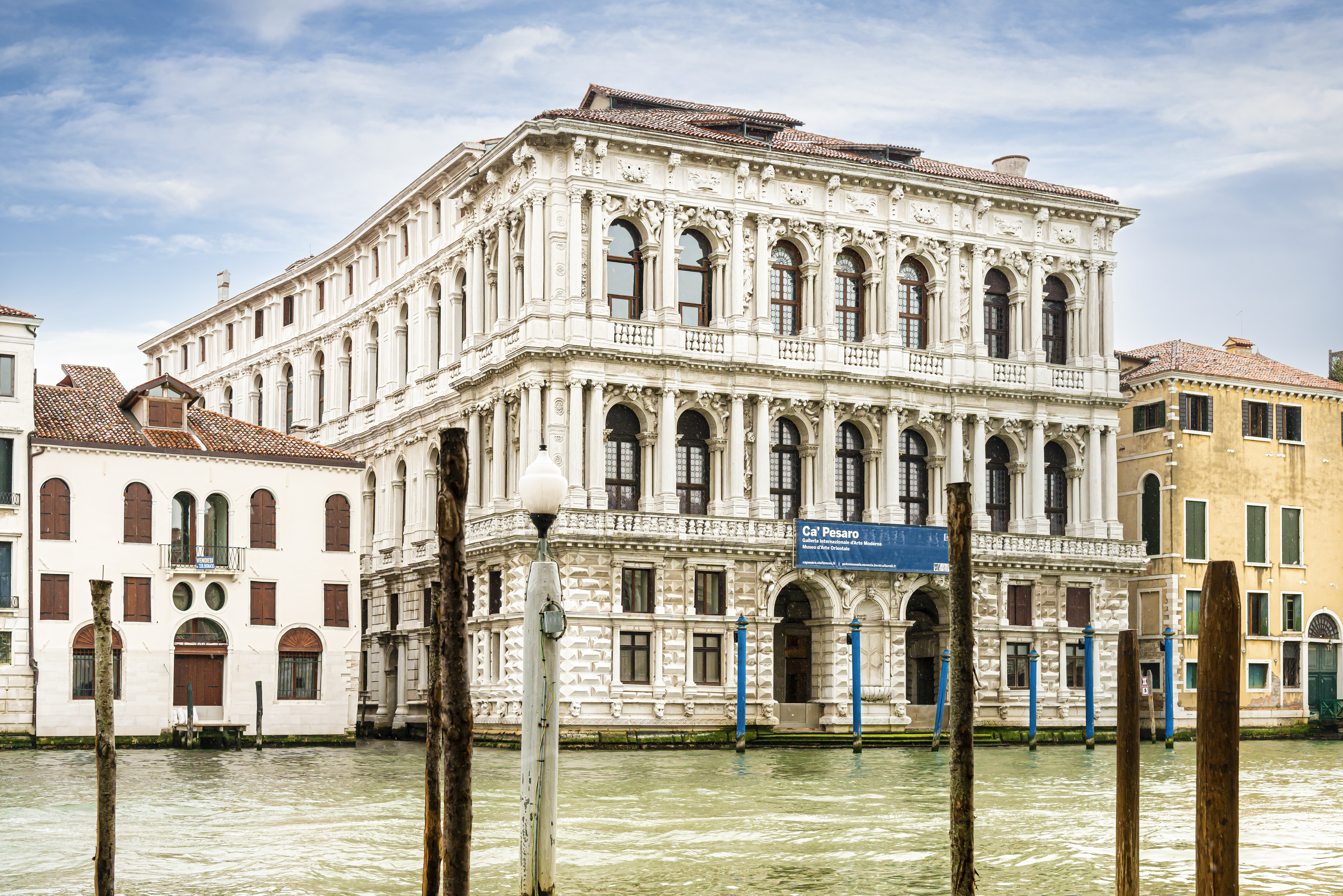
Ca' Pesaro, a 17th-century palace, is today a museum of modern art.

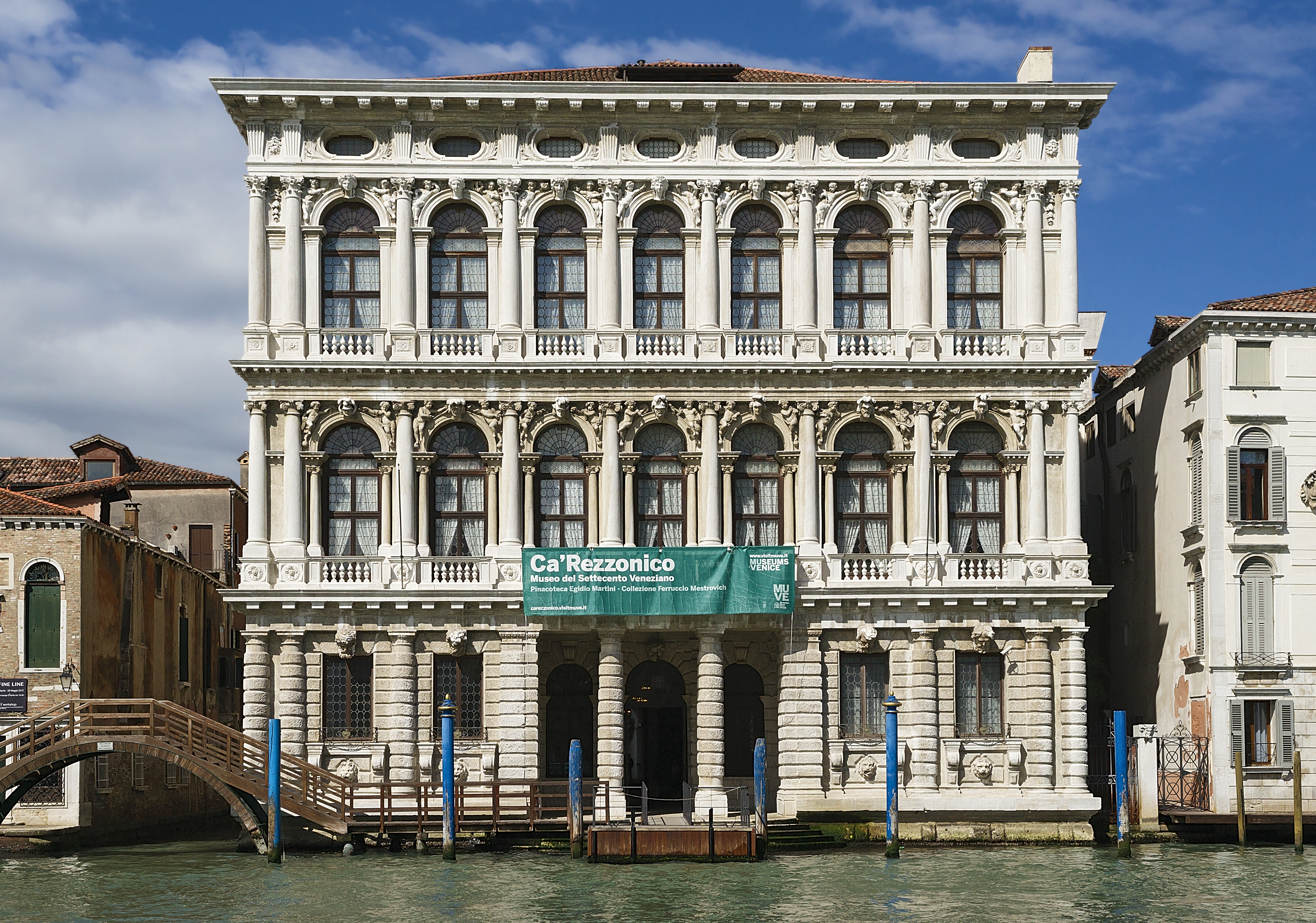
Ca' Rezzonico, today a museum dedicated to 18th-century Venice.

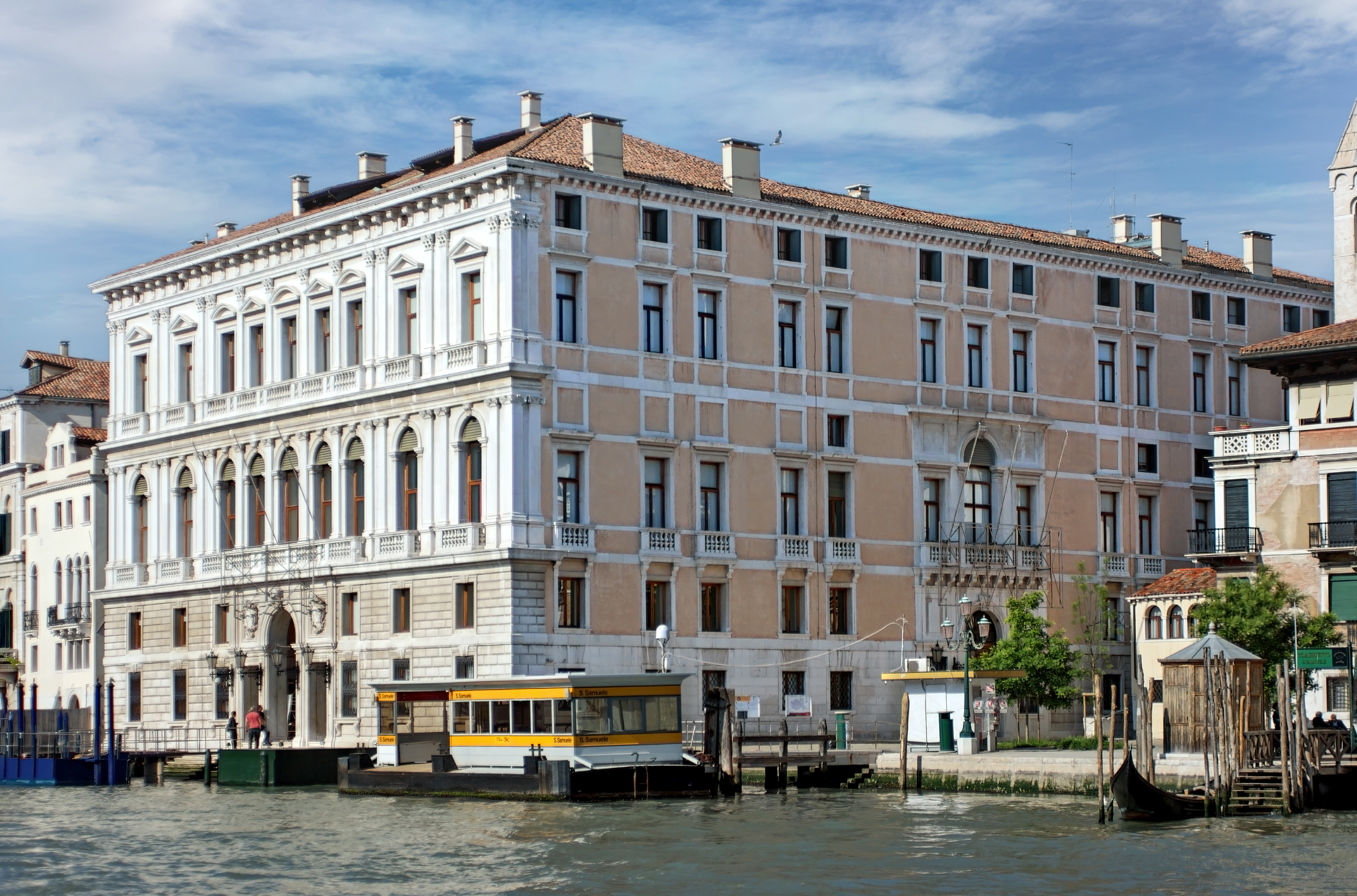
Palazzo Grassi, completed in 1772, is one of the last great palaces in the city.

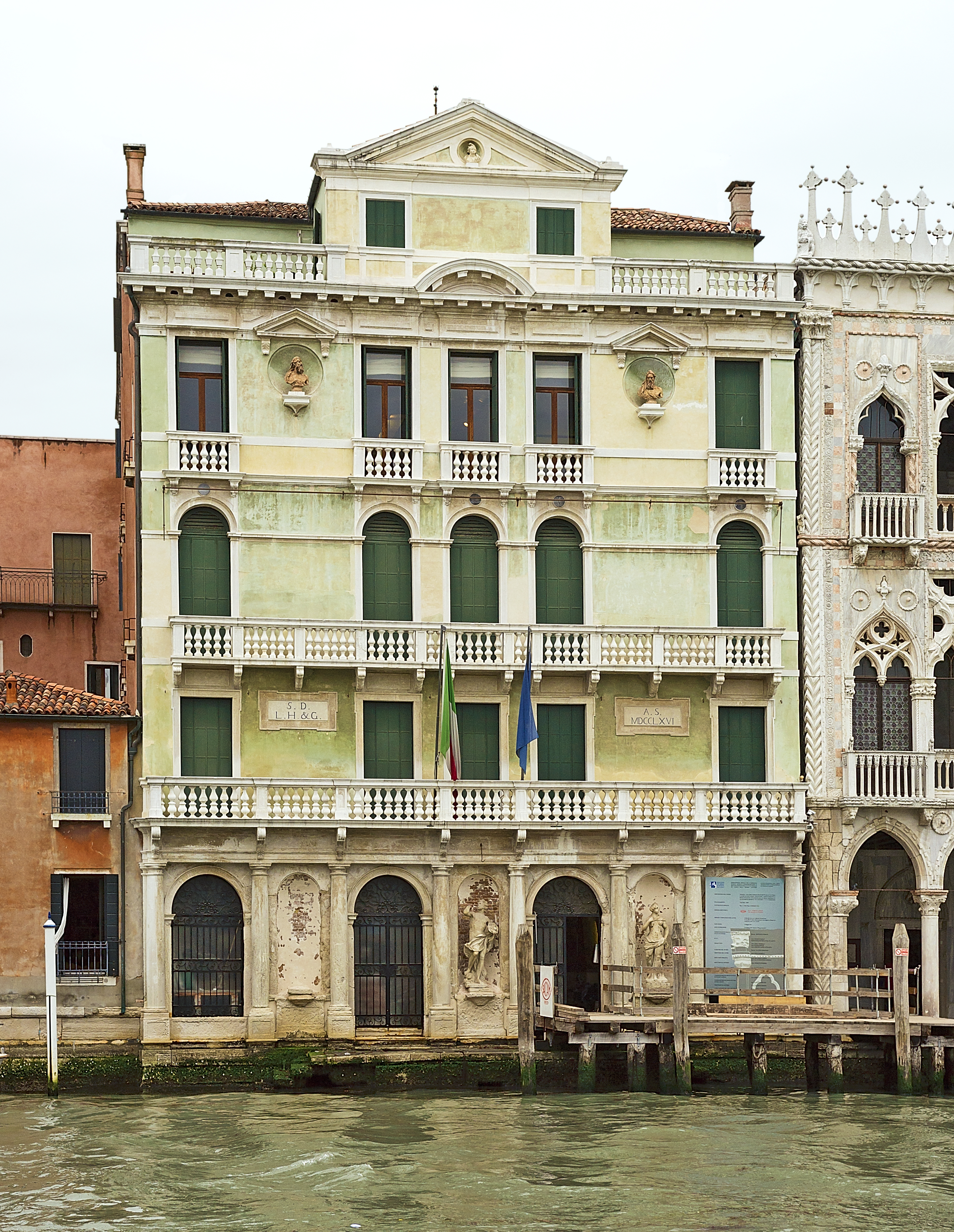
The Palazzo Giusti was built in 1776 and is adjacent to the Ca' d'Oro.

=== Villas ===
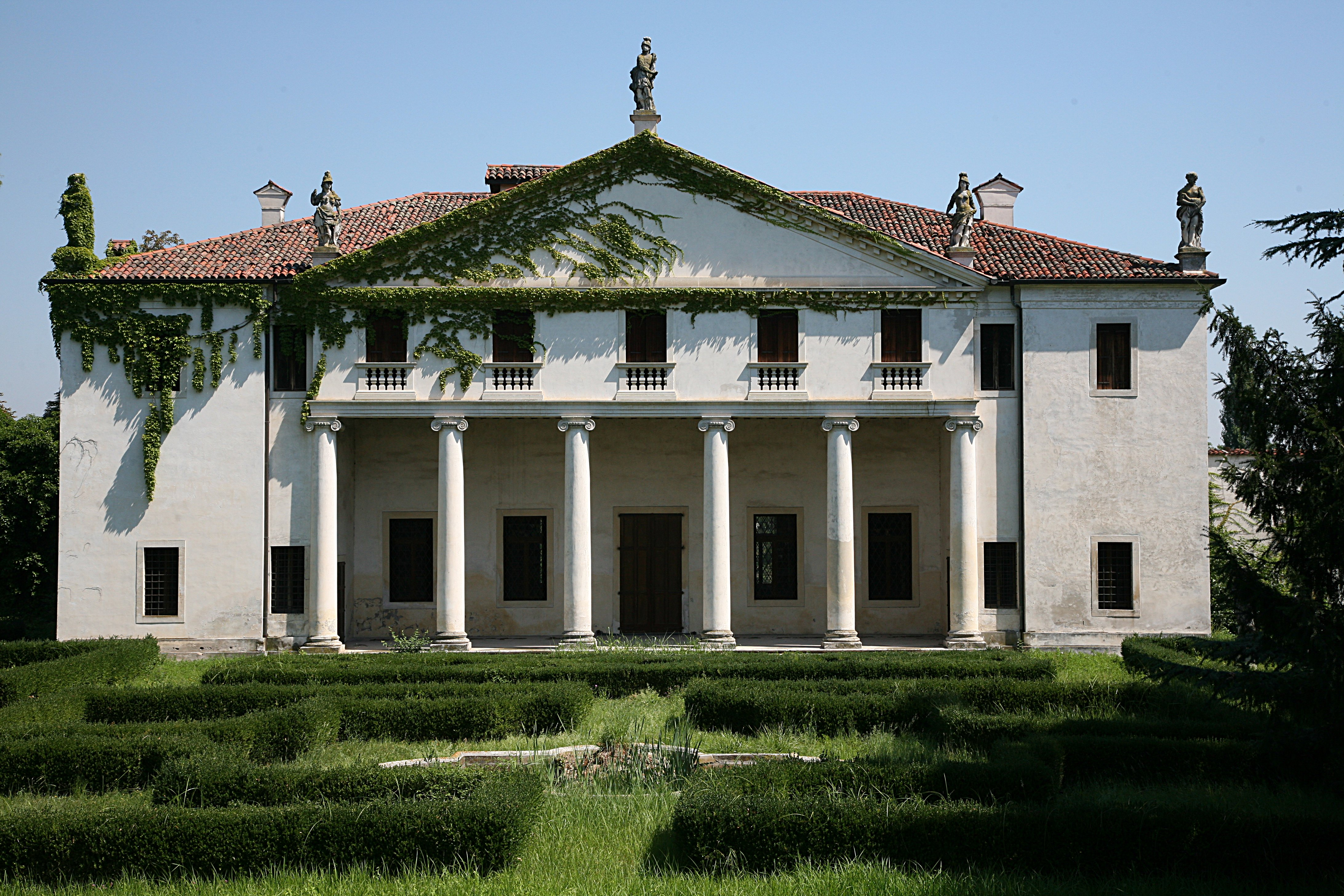
Villa Valmarana, Monticello Conte Otto

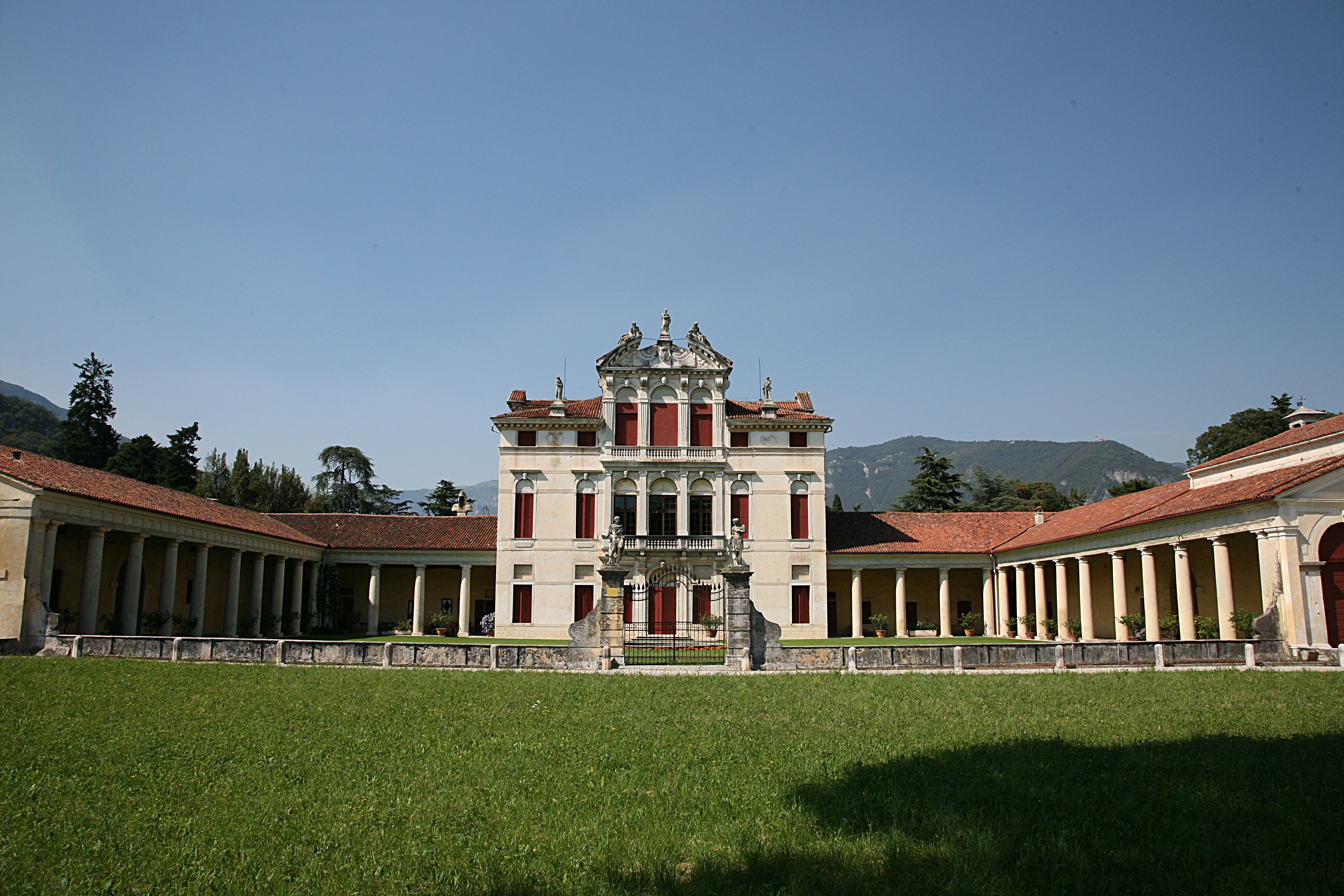
Villa Angarano, Bassano del Grappa

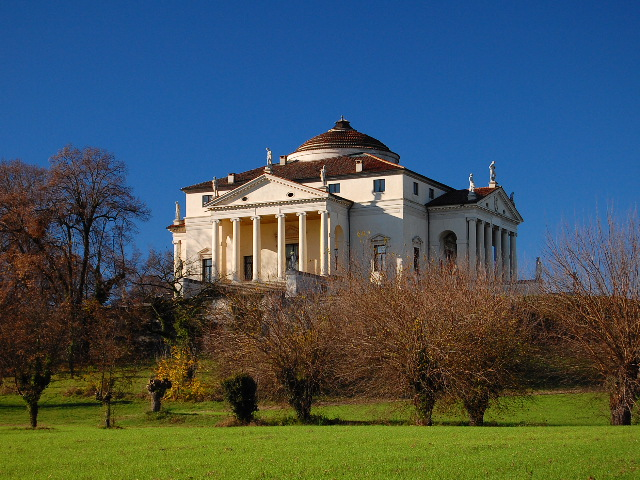
Villa Capra "La Rotonda", Vicenza

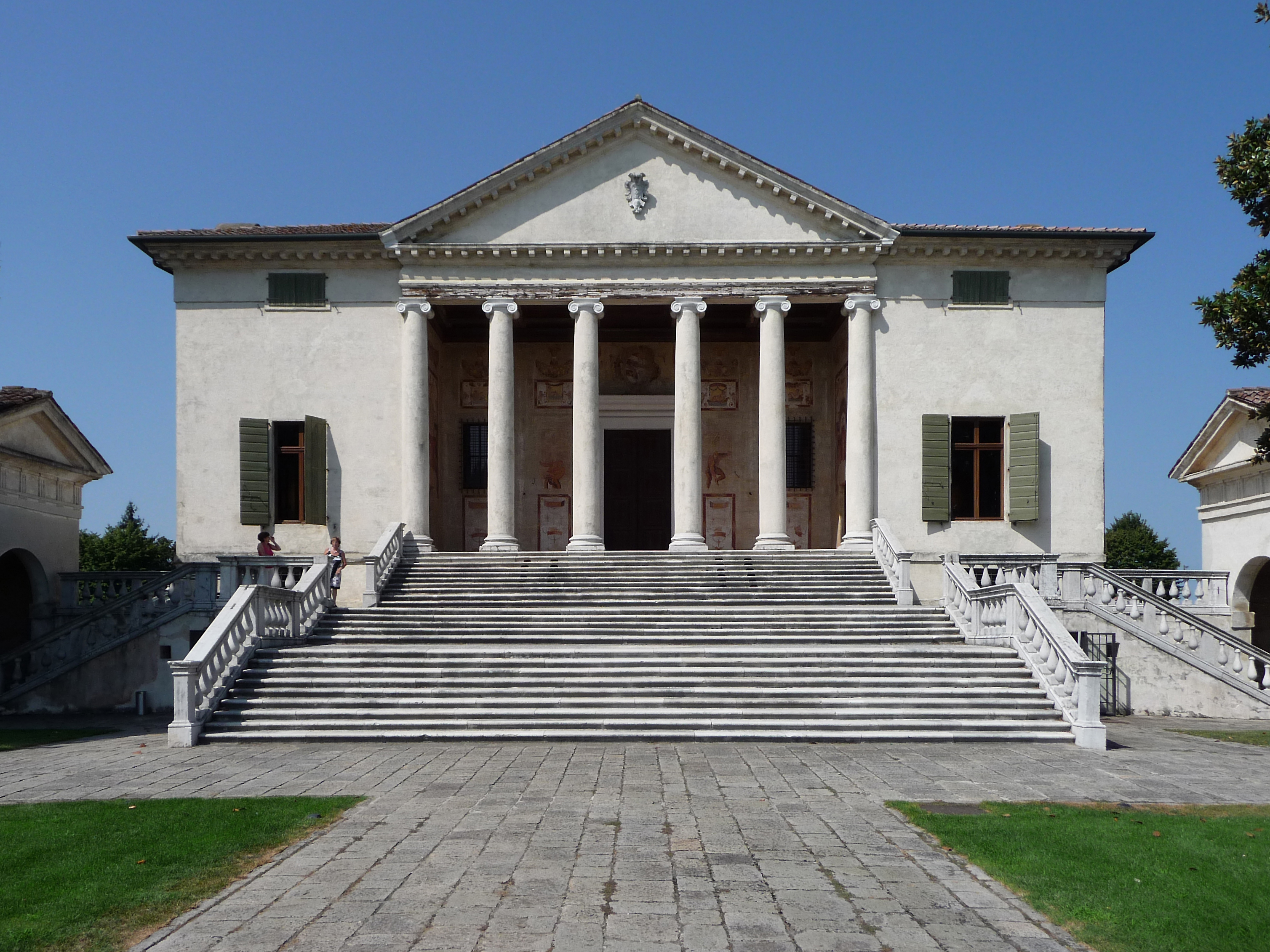
Villa Badoer, Fratta Polesine

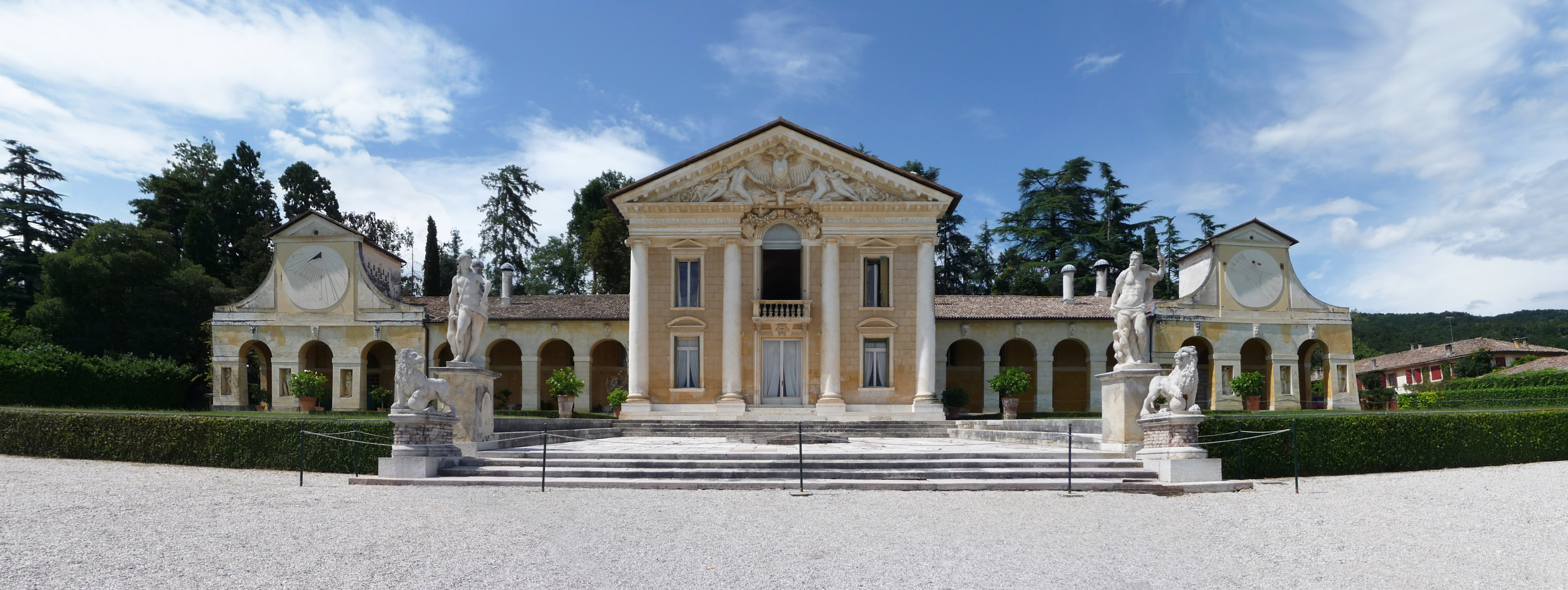
Villa Barbaro, Maser

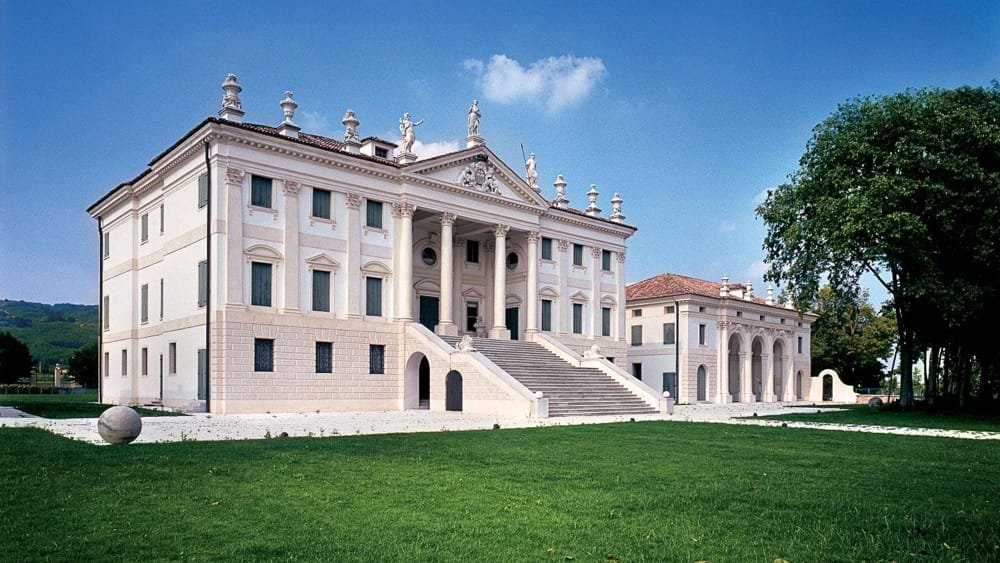
Villa Loredan, Volpago del Montello

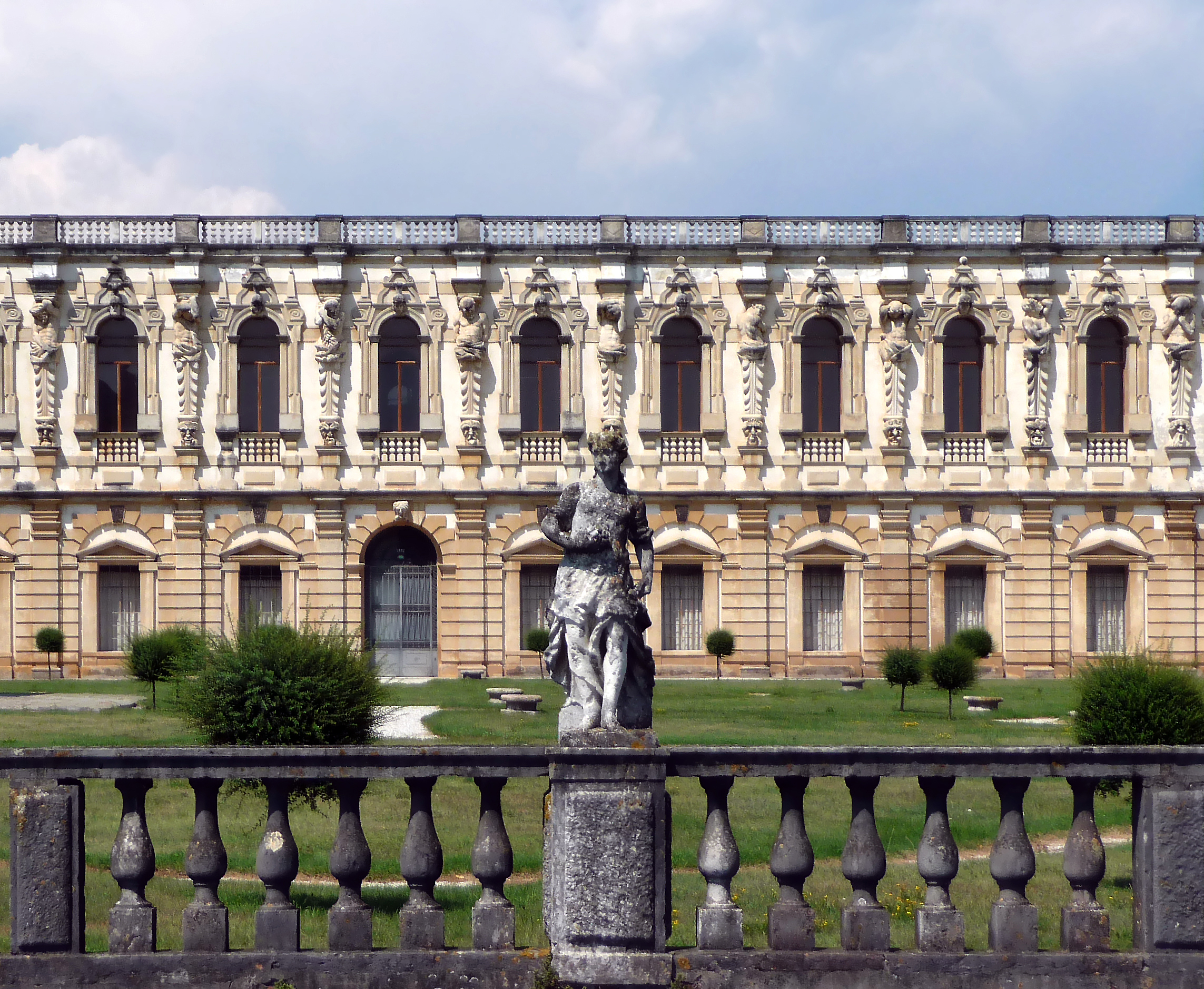
Villa Contarini, Piazzola sul Brenta

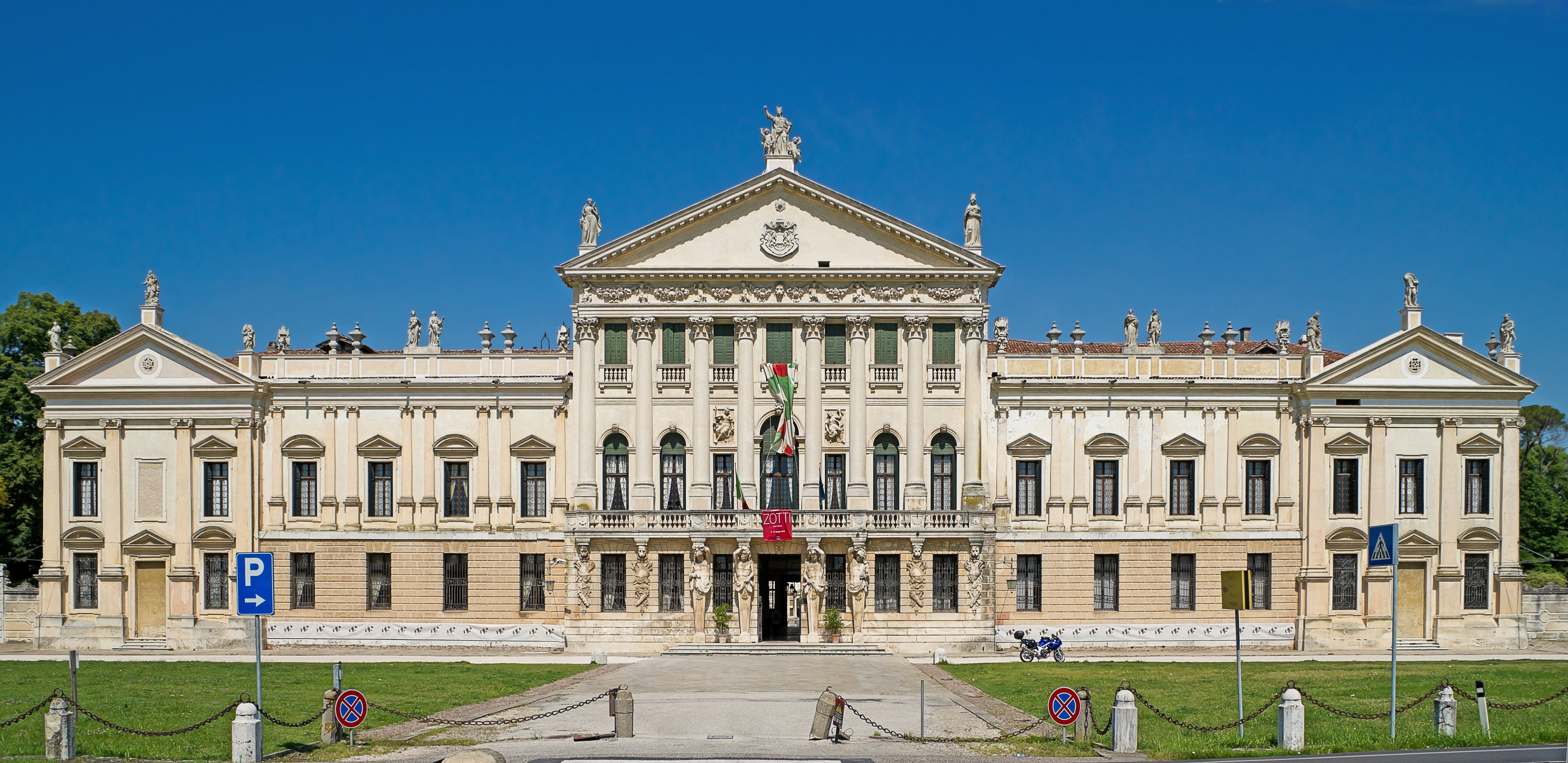
Villa Pisani, Stra

== Bibliography ==
- Dorit Raines, "Cooptazione, aggregazione e presenza al Maggior Consiglio: le casate del patriziato veneziano, 1297-1797" (PDF), in Storia di Venezia - Rivista, I, 2003, pp. 2–64, ISSN 1724-7446 (WC · ACNP).
- Todesco Maria-Teresa, "Andamento demografico della nobiltà veneziana allo specchio delle votazioni nel Maggior Consiglio (1297-1797)" (PDF), in Ateneo Veneto, CLXXVI, 1989.
- Francesco Schröeder, Repertorio genealogico delle famiglie confermate nobili e dei titolati nobili esistenti nelle Provincie Venete, Venezia, Tipografia di Alvisopoli, 1830, p. 246.
- Renzo Derosas, Dal patriziato alla nobiltà. Aspetti della crisi dell'aristocrazia veneziana nella prima metà dell'Ottocento. Publications de l'École française de Rome 107.1 (1988): 333–363.
