= Franceschina Baffo =

16th-century Venetian poet

Franceschina Baffo was a Venetian poet. She was born in the early 16th century. Her Baffo family were a part of the Venetian patriciate, and it is believed that her father was Girolamo Baffo onetime captain of Naples and subsequent senator. By the 1550s, she was composing poems, which received some acclaim from authors of the day. Her works "The Amorous Dialogue" and "The Raverta". In correspondence, Lodovico Domenichi mentions her favorably. Her poems are contained in later collections collated by Luisa Bergalli and Giuseppe Bianchini.
