= Caterina Dolfin =

Italian poet

Caterina Dolfin (Venice, 8 May 1736 – Venice, 14 November 1793) was an Italian (Venetian) poet.

Caterina was the daughter of the N.H. Ser Antonio Giovanni Dolfin and the N.D. Donata Salamon, members of a secondary branch of one of the most ancient families of the Venetian aristocracy. Caterina's father was known to have squandered the family fortune, leaving serious debts to his wife and daughter upon his death in 1753.

In 1755, the young "nobildonna" made a suitable marriage with Marcantonio Tiepolo, a member of another influential noble family which had the means to relieve the Dolfins of their debts. The marriage of Caterina with Marcantonio Tiepolo achieved great notoriety in Venetian society. It is understood that in 1756, only months after her marriage, Caterina entered into a relationship with Andrea Tron, a Statesman, and also member of the aristocracy, although not of the antiquity of the Dolfins. Soon after her affair began, Caterina filed for divorce, the matter was subject of great scandal, but its records, preserved until this day, have been of great interest for academics, containing a rich testimony of the rules, customs and social complexity of Venetian aristocracy. After years of scandal, the divorce was granted in 1772, upon which she married Tron, who used his marriage to enter into the innermost circles of society, and stately institutions, achieving the prestigious office of "Procurator of Saint Mark", the next most important post to that of Doge. From then on, Caterina Dolfin Tron was known as the "Procuratessa".

In 1757, Caterina made her debut as a writer under a pseudonym. Her most famous work was a collection of sonnets inspired by her father, which were published in 1767–68. She was a center of a circle of intellectuals and held a prestigious literary salon. Among her guests were Gaspare Gozzi. In several testimonies of her time, Caterina Dolfin was described as a beautiful, kind, cultivated and refined woman, admired for her brilliant conversation, her graceful poetry and prose. She was also an assistant of Gasparo Gozzi. In 1772, Dolfin was famously called before the Venetian Inquisition due to some of her library's contents being reported to have ideas related to the Enlightenment.

Along with her poetry, famous and intellectual relevance, Caterina Dolfin never ceased to shock Venetian society with her affairs. One of her best known lovers was likely the twenty-seven year old Gian Galeazzo Serbelloni, Duke of San Gabrio. According to their correspondence, still extant today, it can be inferred that the affair may have begun in 1773.

There was a known occasion when Princess Gonzaga, close friend of Caterina, asked her to present her to Venetian society during her visit to the city. The Princess had also been the subject of many scandals. When arriving at the Ducal Court, the noble ladies of the Venetian aristocracy refused to speak to her. However, Caterina Dolfin said out loud: "Ladies, this is Princess Gonzaga, she as I belongs to an illustrious family, as for many of you, I could not say."

In 1778, Andrea Tron, Caterina's husband was elected senator. However, he lost the 1779 election to become Doge of Venice although he was one of the two main candidates. This is partially attributed to the political scandals surrounding Caterina at that time, as was her involvement in the "Gratarolo Affair", named after Secretary of State Antonio Gratarolo. The case consisted in a series of courtly intrigues to get the post of Ambassador to the Duchy of Savoy for one of two candidates, one supported by Gratarolo, and the other by Caterina Dolfin. In 1772, Gratarolo defeated Caterina's candidate. In 1775, a theatrical play, supposedly commissioned by Caterina, exposed Gratarolo's intrigues and affairs. In the same year of her husband's candidacy for Doge, Gratarolo answered the insult with another play, which caricatured Dolfin and her social circle, exposing her love affairs and staining her name and reputation publicly. The play destroyed Andrea Tron's chances to become Doge. The victorious candidate turned out to have a spouse even more unsuitable for the title of Dogaressa, Margherita Delmaz, but is reported to have bribed many of the electors to assure her acceptance.

Caterina Dolfin was widowed in 1785. She was left a fortune but became entangled in a dispute with her former in-laws. Starting in 1788, she increasingly spent her time at her house in Padua. In her last years, she worked on a project for the reform of female education, which does not appear to have come to fruition before her death.
