= Ermolao Barbaro (died 1556) =

Ermolao (Almorò) Barbaro (c. 1493 – 3 November 1556) was a Venetian patrician, diplomat, governor and officer in the Venetian navy.

Barbaro was born around 1493 to Alvise (Luigi) Barbaro and Cassandra Trevisan. His paternal grandfather was Zaccaria Barbaro and his uncle and namesake was the famous humanist Ermolao Barbaro. He was a schoolboy when Desiderius Erasmus visited Venice. Erasmus mentions in letter 611 how Ulrich von Hutten was welcomed to Venice in 1516 by Barbaro and Giambattista Egnazio. There is, however, no later evidence of Barbaro's continuing literary or humanistic interests.

Barbaro's first public post was in the maritime customs office (ufficio della doana da mar), to which he was elected in September 1515. He was an unsuccessful candidate for the Council of Forty (1516) and the Savi agli Ordini (1518). In September 1525, he was elected to the Savi. In February 1526, he was elected sopracomito (commander) of a galley. He was reelected to the Savi in April 1527, but had to step down in July to go to Alexandria, probably on business.

During the War of the League of Cognac, Barbaro was reelected to the Savi in March 1528. He was soon given 25 soldiers and responsibility for the defence of one of the gates of Verona against the Emperor Charles V. He was in Verona in June, but by September he was back in Venice introducing a law in the Senate. In July 1529, he was the sopracomito of a galley in the fleet of Captain General Girolamo da Ca' da Pesaro. He was sent to Koper (Capodistria) to defend it from the Spanish. In September, he relayed a message to the provveditore Giovanni Vitturi in Trani and brought back a message to Venice. In December, he was dispatched to Zakynthos (Zante). In April 1530, he was with his ship in Heraklion (Candia) in need of repairs.

On 28 May 1531, Barbaro was involved in a skirmish off Corfu with three corsair fustas. He succeeded in capturing one, but suffered heavy damage as a result. The galley returned to Venice in January 1532 to be broken up. Marino Sanuto records that Barbaro had served well ("avea ben servito"). As he had probably covered many of the costs of the galley out of his own funds, the republic owed him 2,700 ducats.

In 1532, Barbaro was named provveditore al cottimo (tax collector) of the consulate in Alexandria. From 1533 to 1537, he served as the consul. He ended his career with a string of governorships. From 1541 to 1543, he was podestà (governor) of Bergamo. He was then governor of Verona (1544–1545) and Padua (1548–1550). He was unable to resolve a dispute between the council of nobles and the guilds of Padua and so had to refer it to the Signoria. He died on 3 November 1556 and was buried in San Francesco della Vigna.

== Bibliography ==
- Lowry, M. J. C. (1985). "Ermolao (II) Barbaro". In P. G. Bietenholz; T. B. Deutscher (eds.). Contemporaries of Erasmus: A Biographical Register of the Renaissance and Reformation. Vol. 1. University of Toronto Press. p. 92.
- Ventura, Angelo (1964). "Barbaro, Ermolao". Dizionario Biografico degli Italiani (in Italian). Vol. 6: Baratteri–Bartolozzi. Rome: Istituto dell'Enciclopedia Italiana. pp. 99–100. OCLC 883370.
