= N.H. / N.D. =

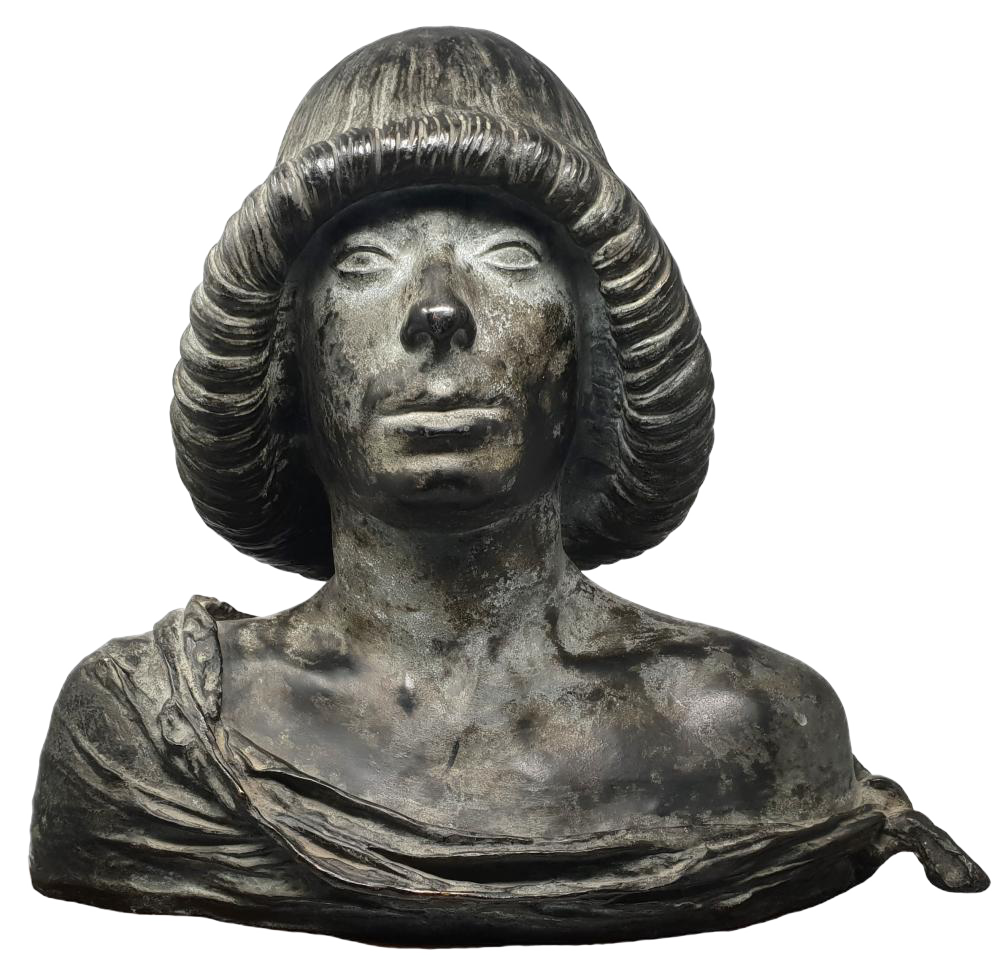
Andrea Loredan, Venetian nobleman of the Loredan family, bust by Antonio Rizzo, Museo Correr

N.H. and N.D. are two Latin abbreviations, used mainly in the Italian language, to indicate respectively "Nobilis Homo" (a noble man) and "Nobilis Domina" (a noble woman), in particular with reference to the patricians of the Republic of Venice. In formal written texts they are placed before the name, as a courtesy title, and roughly correspond to "lord" and "lady" in the English language.
