= Emilio Maria Manolesso =

Italian historian

Emilio Maria Manolesso (8 December 1547 – c. 1584), also known as Emiliano Manolesso, was an Italian historian, born in Venice, who wrote a chronicle of the contemporary wars between the Ottomans and European states.

== Biography ==
While born to the old Venetian family of the Manolesso, his family was not part of the aristocracy, thus held no posts in the Maggior Consiglio. Emilio studied law at the University of Padua, obtaining a doctorate in 1563. During the following decade he served the Duke Alfonso II d'Este in Ferrara. He began soon after to compile his Historia nova, not published until 1572 in Padua by the shop of Lorenzo Pasquato. It was dedicated to doge Alvise Mocenigo, the Spanish ambassador Diego Guzmán de Silva, and the nuncio to Venice, Antonio Facchinetti (future Pope Innocent IX). The history chronicles the engagements beginning with the siege of Cyprus and other engagement in the battles occurring during 1570-1572 between the Ottoman Empire and the Holy League. Despite his dedication to the Doge, it appears a Venetian ruling council unsuccessfully tried to suppress the publication. In 1573, he published a short speech on the geography, customs, and government of the Polish-Lithuanian confederation. He did not get reappointed to ambassadorships late in life, and published various other texts.

== Bibliography ==
- Translated mainly from Italian Wikipedia entry, that depends on entry by Roberto Zago, [www.treccani.it/enciclopedia/emilio-maria-manolesso_%28Dizionario-Biografico%29/] accessed on 29 April 2011.

== Bibliography ==
- Zago, Roberto (2007). "MANOLESSO, Emilio Maria". Dizionario Biografico degli Italiani (in Italian). Vol. 69: Mangiabotti–Marconi. Rome: Istituto dell'Enciclopedia Italiana. ISBN 978-88-12-00032-6.
