= Teodoro Loredan Balbi =

18th/19th-century Bishop of Novigrad

- Bishop of Novigrad
- Church: Roman Catholic Church
- Province: Istria
- Diocese: Diocese of Novigrad
- Appointed: 1 June 1795
- In office: 1 June 1795 – 23 May 1831
- Predecessor: Antonio Giovanni Giuseppe Lucovich

Orders
- Ordination: by Pope Pius VI

Personal details
- Born: 7 November 1745 Krk, Republic of Venice
- Died: 23 May 1831 (aged 85) Novigrad, Austrian Empire
- Education: University of Padua

Teodoro Loredan Balbi (Krk, 7 November 1745 - Novigrad, 23 May 1831) was a Venetian nobleman of the Loredan and Balbi families and the last Bishop of Novigrad, a position which he held from 1795 until his death on 23 May 1831.

== Biography ==
He has roots in two important Venetian noble families - Loredan and Balbi. He was ordained a priest in 1768. His uncle, the Bishop of Pula, Giovanni Andrea Balbi, appointed him a canon scholastic, prosinodal examiner and inquisitor in his diocese. In 1795 he received his doctorate in theology from the University of Padua, and in the same year Pope Pius VI appointed him as Bishop of Novigrad. Sudden political changes caused by the Napoleonic Wars soon followed: the collapse of the Venetian Republic in 1797, a brief change in Austrian and French rule, and the eventual establishment of Austrian rule in Istria after the Congress of Vienna in 1815. Although he did not get involved in the political events of the time, Napoleon's authorities detained him for 10 months in Venice after a trial, where he experienced all sorts of humiliations. After returning to the seat, he was for a time the only bishop in Istria and, under the authority of the Holy See, he visited the dioceses of Poreč and Pula. At the suggestion of Holy Roman Emperor Francis I, Pope Leo XII abolished the Diocese of Novigrad in 1828, which became part of the Diocese of Trieste, but, according to the Pope's order, only after Teodoro Loredan Balbi's death. As a bishop, according to his records, he sent three relations to the Holy See, in 1798, 1802 and 1807, but as they were not properly worded, the secretariat of the Congregation received them as letters. In them he reported that in the diocese there were one cathedral and one choir church, 17 parishes, and many fraternities; that he opened a seminary and a pawnshop, founded a canonry of theologians and penitents, etc. The last bishop of Novigrad was buried in the church of St. Agatha in Novigrad, and his remains were transferred in 1852 to the bishop's tomb in the cathedral.
