= Lorenzo Pasqualigo =

Lorenzo Pasqualigo was a Venetian at the court of Henry VIII of England. He was based in London, and his brother, Pietro Pasqualigo, was the Venetian ambassador to Lisbon. Lorenzo's extant letters have been used to learn about the early travels of John Cabot to the American coastline.
