= Marieta Morosina Priuli =

Italian composer

Marieta Morosina Priuli (fl. 1665) was an Italian composer.

She was born in Venice into the Morosina family. Priuli published two collections of works in 1665, one dedicated to the Habsburg Dowager Empress Eleonor Magdalene of Neuburg entitled Balletti e correnti. It included five sets of pieces for three string instruments and harpsichord continuo, and eight correnti. The other one entitled Correnti Da sonarsi col Violino, e spinetta is dedicated to Maria Mancini and includes twelve correnti for violin and basso continuo.

Several Italian women from this period of time are known to have published instrumental music. Both Priuli and Isabella Leonarda published one collection each, Isabella Leonarda's Opus 16; Priuli's Balletti e correnti.
