= Marino Faliero, Doge of Venice =

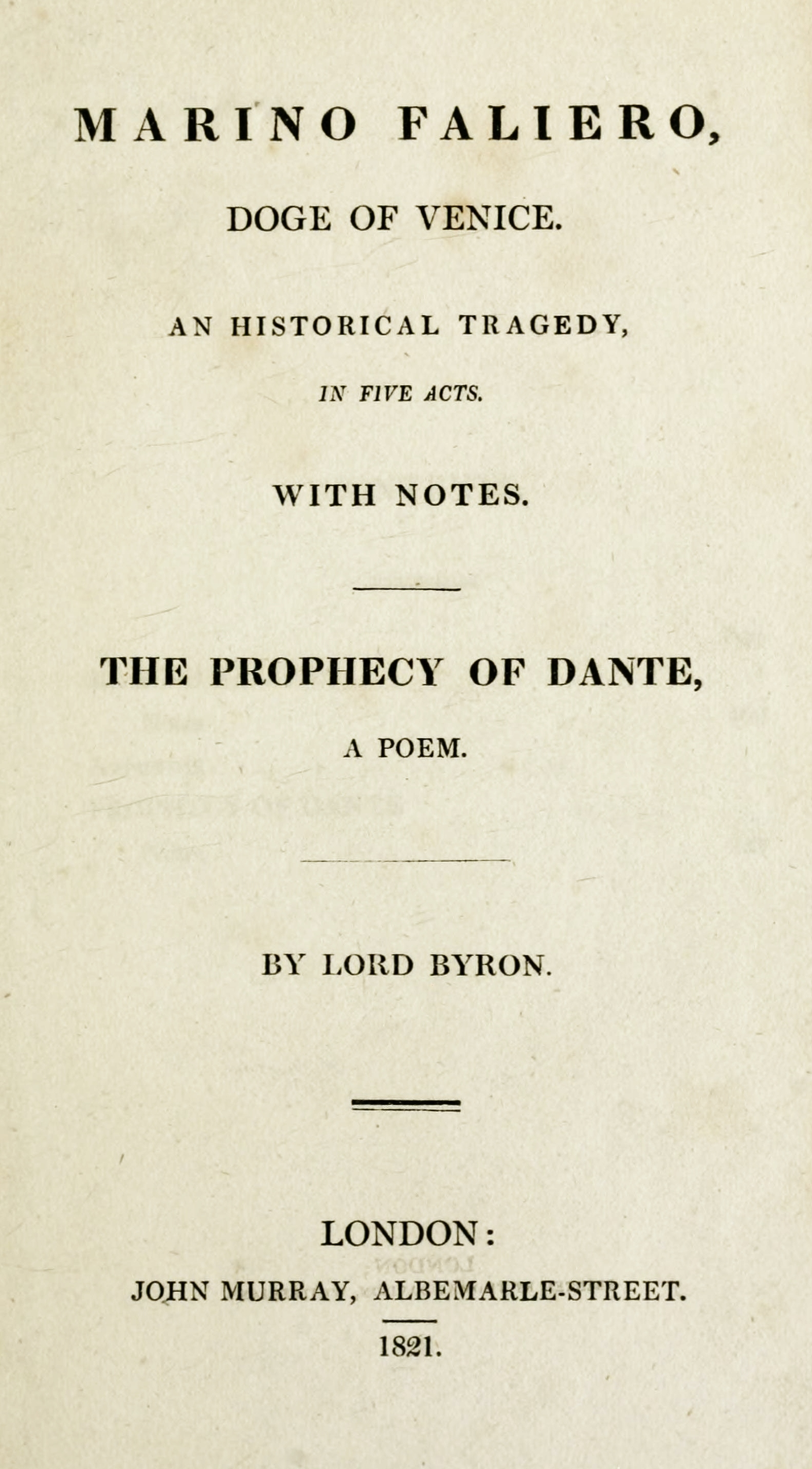
- First edition title page
- Written by: Lord Byron
- Characters: Marino Faliero; Bertuccio Faliero; Lioni; Benintende; Michel Steno; Israel Bertuccio; Philip Calendaro; Dagolino; Bertram; Signor of the Night; First Citizen; Second Citizen; Third Citizen; Vincenzo; Pietro; Battista; Secretary of the Council of Ten; Angiolina; Marianna
- Original language: English
- Subject: The downfall of Marino Faliero
- Genre: Historical tragedy
- Setting: Venice

Premiere
- Date premiered: 25 April 1821
- Place premiered: Drury Lane, London

Marino Faliero, Doge of Venice is a blank verse tragedy in five acts by Lord Byron, published and first performed in 1821.

== Synopsis ==
The play is set in Venice in 1355. Marino Faliero, recently elected Doge of Venice, offends one of the chief officers of state, Michele Steno. Steno retaliates by writing on the Doge's throne an indecent libel on Faliero's wife. For this he is tried by the Council of Forty and convicted, but is only sentenced to a month's imprisonment. Faliero is so outraged by this, as he believes it to be an inadequate punishment for such an affront to the ruling Doge, that he secretly joins in the conspiracy of a group of malcontents to abolish the constitution of Venice, thinking thereby to gain revenge on his enemies. The plot is discovered and Faliero is executed.

== Composition and publication ==
Byron was inspired to take on this subject when, on examining the portraits of the Doges in the Palazzo Ducale in Venice, he discovered that the portrait of Faliero had been blacked out. The main historical source he drew on was Marino Sanuto's Vite dei Dogi (published posthumously 1733). He completed the play in July 1820, by which time he was living in Ravenna, and published it in April 1821, along with his The Prophecy of Dante. He intended to dedicate it to Goethe, but delays in the post between Italy and England resulted in the play being published without a dedication. The posthumous 1832 edition of Byron's collected works included a later dedication of the play by Byron to his friend Douglas Kinnaird. Marino Faliero was translated into French in 1830 and into Italian in 1838.

== First performance ==
Byron intended his play to be read rather than acted, and when he heard that the actor-manager Robert William Elliston intended to stage it he caused his publisher, John Murray, to obtain an injunction to prevent him. Elliston nevertheless performed it, in a version cut almost by half, at Drury Lane four days after the play was published. The reaction from both audiences and critics was lukewarm; perhaps, as Byron thought, because of the play's neoclassical form and lack of sensationalism and love interest.

== Influence ==
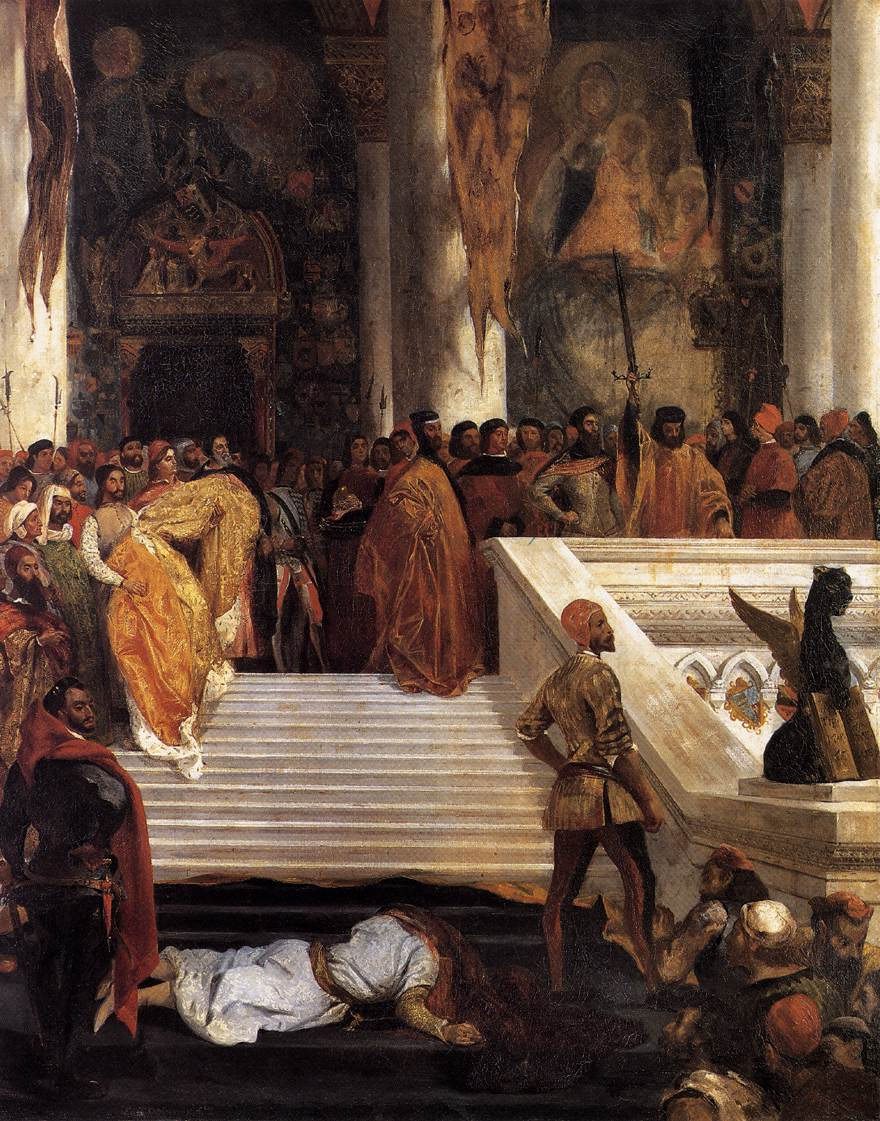
The Execution of the Doge Marino Faliero (Delacroix, 1825–26)

The subject of Eugène Delacroix' painting The Execution of the Doge Marino Faliero (1825–26), now in the Wallace Collection in London, was suggested by Byron's play. A tragedy by Casimir Delavigne on the same subject is believed to have drawn on Byron, as well as on a story by E. T. A. Hoffmann, and Delavigne's play itself inspired Donizetti's opera Marino Faliero. Swinburne was impelled to write his own Marino Faliero by what he considered shortcomings in Byron's play.
