= Marino Faliero (opera) =

1835 tragic opera by Gaetano Donizetti

- Opera by Gaetano Donizetti
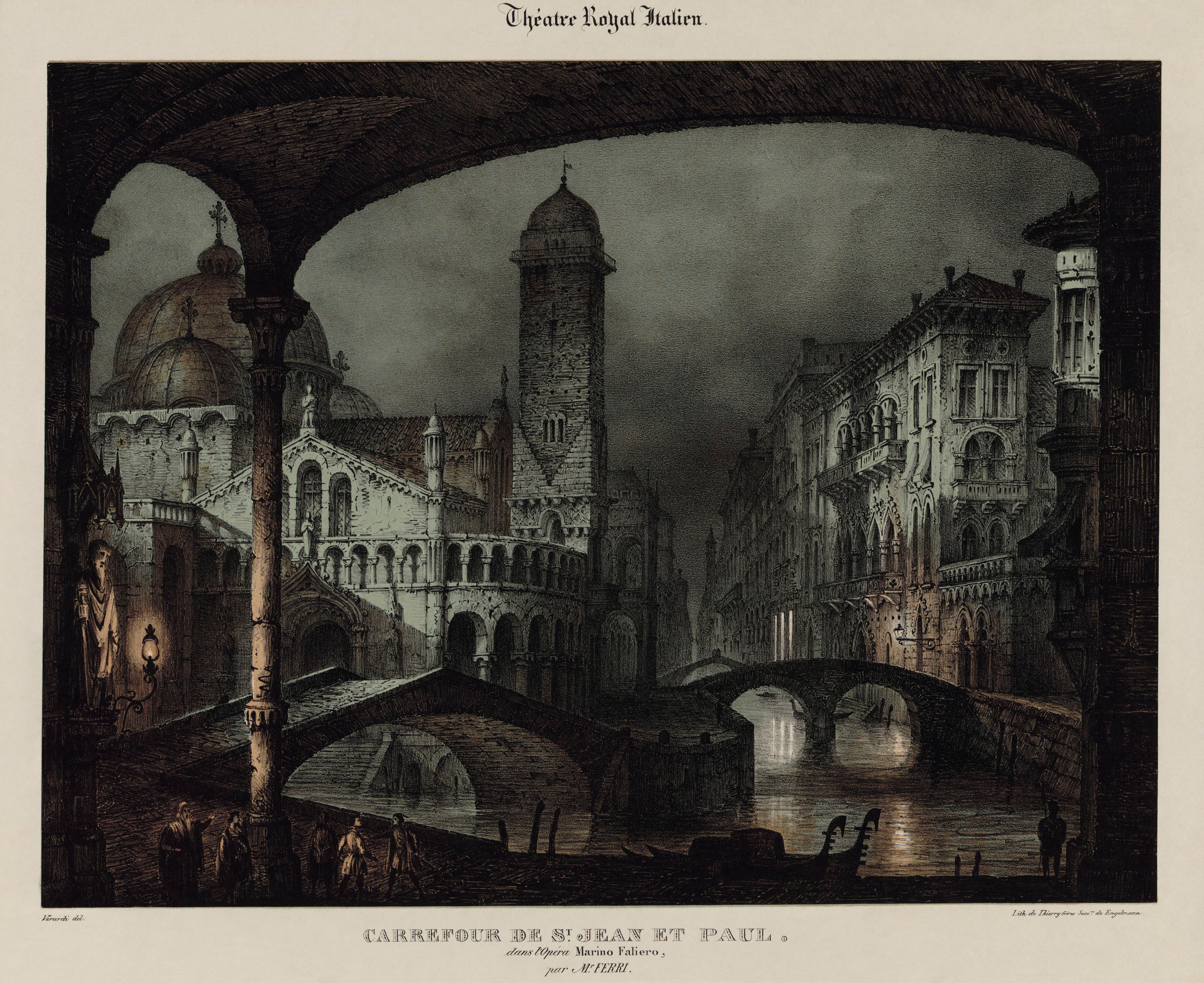
- Set design for Act II in the original production, which takes place near the Basilica dei Santi Giovanni e Paolo
- Librettist: Giovanni Emanuele Bidera
- Language: Italian
- Based on: Casimir Delavigne's play Marino Faliero and Lord Byron's drama Marino Faliero
- Premiere: 12 March 1835; Théâtre-Italien, Paris

Marino Faliero (or Marin Faliero) is a tragedia lirica, or tragic opera, in three acts by Gaetano Donizetti. Giovanni Emanuele Bidera wrote the Italian libretto, with revisions by Agostino Ruffini, after Casimir Delavigne's play. It is inspired by Lord Byron's drama Marino Faliero (1820) and based on the life of Marino Faliero (c.1285-1355), the Venetian Doge.

Rossini, acting as the Théâtre Italien's music director, had commissioned works by the outstanding Italian composers of the day—Donizetti and Vincenzo Bellini. Both wrote operas for that house in Paris, Bellini's contribution being the hugely successful I puritani. Donizetti's opera, which premiered on 12 March 1835 (a few months after I puritani) was not nearly as much of a success. However, it marked Donizetti's first opera to have its premiere in Paris.

== Performance history ==
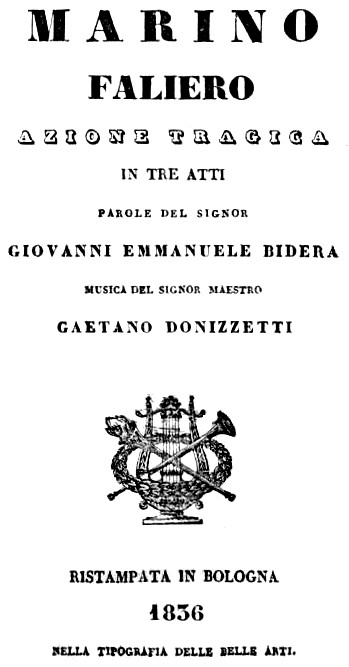
Title page of a libretto, Bologna 1836

After the Paris première, Marino Faliero was presented in London at Covent Garden on 14 May 1835 and at the Teatro Alfieri in Florence in 1836. Its first appearance in the US took place at the St. Charles Theater in New Orleans on 22 February 1842. However, after several prohibitions from September 1839 onward, the opera was not presented until 3 September 1848, the day which Black notes was the one on which the composer died in Bergamo. The opera had a number of productions in the 19th century, but by the 20th it had become a rarity. The Donizetti Festival in Bergamo staged the work in 2008.

== Roles ==
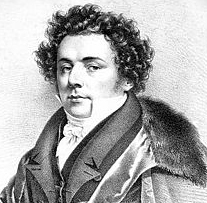
Luigi Lablache in 1827, the first Marino

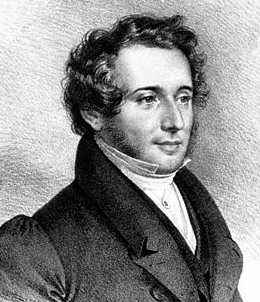
Antonio Tamburini, the first Israele

Role	Voice type	Premiere Cast, 12 March 1835 (Conductor: - )
Marin Faliero, the Doge of Venice	bass	Luigi Lablache
Israele Bertucci, chief of the Venetian Arsenal	baritone	Antonio Tamburini
Fernando, Faliero's nephew, in love with Elena	tenor	Giovanni Battista Rubini
Steno, member of the Council of Forty	bass	Vincenzo Felice Santini
Leoni, Member of the Council of Ten	tenor	
Elena, The Doge's wife	soprano	Giulia Grisi
Irene, Elena's servant	soprano	
Vincenzo, the Doge's servant	tenor	
Beltrame, a sculptor	bass	
Pietro, a gondolier	tenor	Nicola Ivanoff
Guido, a fisherman	bass	
Gentlemen, knights, craftsmen, fishermen, servants, soldiers

== Synopsis ==
Place: Venice
Time: 1355

=== Act 1 ===
Elena, the wife of Marin Faliero, Doge of Venice, is continually subjected to attacks on her reputation by the patrician Steno whose advances she has rejected. Steno then insults Israele Bertucci, the chief of the Venetian Arsenal, in front of his workers. Steno is punished for these offences, but Faliero is infuriated by the leniency of the punishment. At the Doge's Palace, Israele convinces Faliero to join a conspiracy against the Council of Forty, of which Steno is a member. Elena and her lover Fernando, Faliero's nephew, decide to part. He will leave the city to save her from dishonour. She gives him a veil to remember her by. The climax of the act takes place at a masked ball in the palace when Fernando challenges Steno to a duel for having insulted Elena once again.

=== Act 2 ===
The duel having taken place, Fernando is found dying near the Basilica dei Santi Giovanni e Paolo, where the conspirators were to meet. Faliero vows to avenge his death.

=== Act 3 ===
The conspiracy collapses following a betrayal by one of its members and the Doge is condemned to death at a trial in the Doge's Palace. Before his execution, Elena confesses her love affair with Fernando to him. Faliero begins to curse her, but sensing that his death is imminent, pardons her instead. Faliero is led off. Alone on the stage, Elena hears the sound of the executioner's axe, screams and faints.

== Recordings ==
Year	Cast: Marino Faliero, Israele Bertucci, Fernando, Elena	Conductor, Opera House and Orchestra	Label
1976	Cesare Siepi, Licinio Montefusco, Giuliano Ciannella, Marisa Galvany	Elio Boncompagni, RAI Milan Symphony Orchestra	Audio CD: Bongiovanni; Cat: 2408/9-2; Myto Records; Cat: MCD 054.314
2002	Michele Pertusi, Roberto Servile, Rockwell Blake, Mariella Devia	Ottavio Dantone, Orchestra and Chorus of Teatro Regio Parma (Recording of a performance in Parma, 2 January)	Audio CD: House of Opera; Cat: CD 820; DVD: Hardy; Cat: HCD 4025
2008	Giorgio Surian, Luca Grassi, Ivan Magri, Rachele Stanisci	Bruno Cinquegrani, Orchestra and Chorus of Bergamo Musica Festival Gaetano Donizetti, (Filmed at the Teatro Donizetti, Bergamo, 31 October and 2 November)	DVD: Naxos, Cat: VD 2.110616-17.
