= Faliero =

Venetian patrician family

Coat of arms of the Falier family

Faliero (Venetian: Falier), also encountered in the variants Faleiro, Faledro or Faletro, was the name of a Venetian patrician family.

== History ==
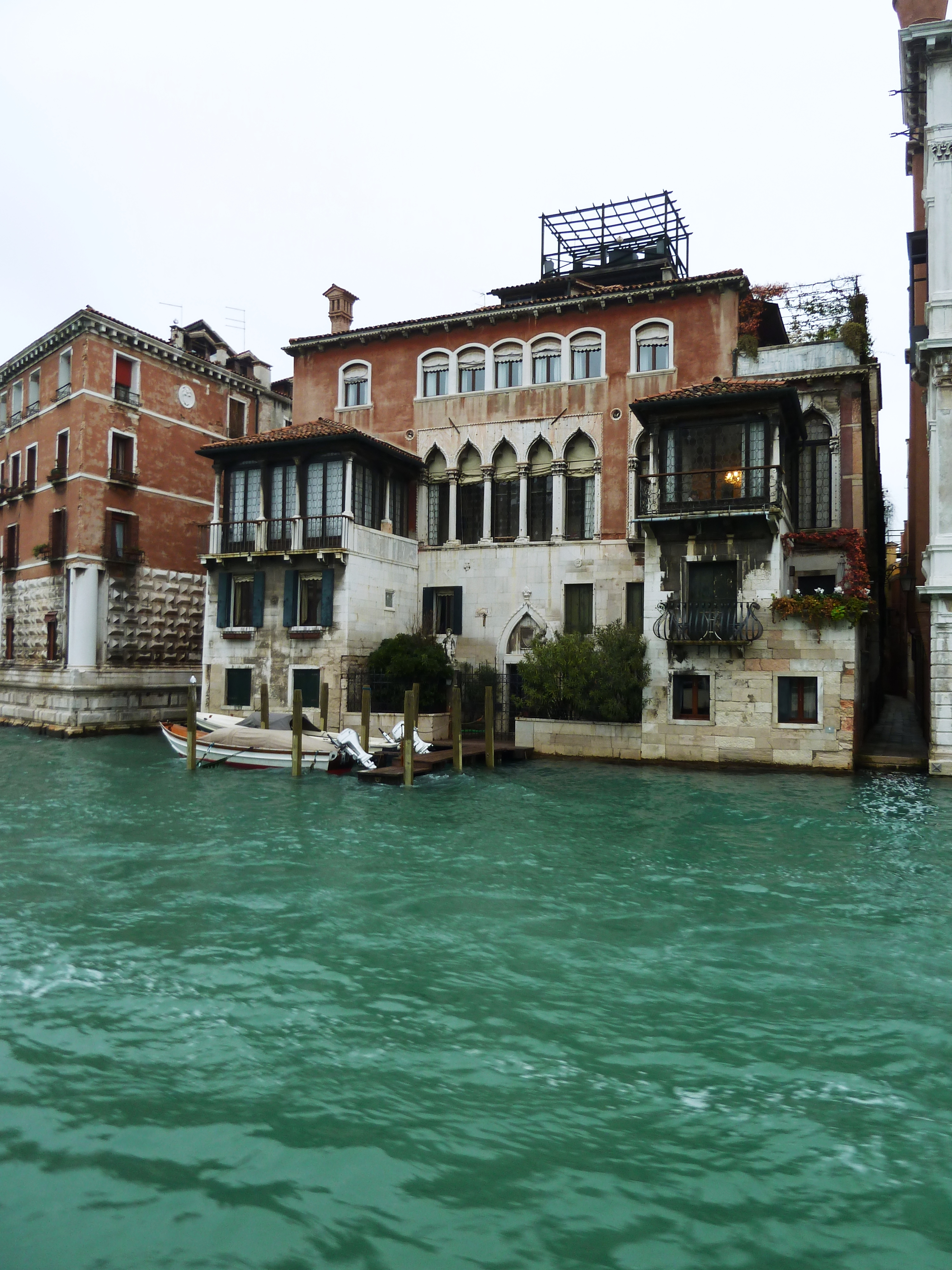
Palazzo Falier Canossa

The family was one of the oldest in Venice, its history being lost in the myths surrounding the city's foundation at the end of Late Antiquity. According to the not very reliable 13th-century Chronicon Altinate, the family originally was called Anafesti, and haled from Fano, before moving to Padua and thence to Jesolo in the Venetian Lagoon as a result of Padua's fall to the Lombards. Other sources try to connect the Falieri with the Ordelaffi from Forli, and suggest a Lombard origin, but this is mostly speculation on the basis of the similarity of their names (Ordelaf being the anagram of Faledro).

When the seat of Venice was moved from Eraclea to the Rialto in the early 9th century, they were among the fifty or so tribunician families to move there. The first member of the family is attested in a public act of April 912, where a certain Orso Faletro Dodono acted as witness. It appears that the family was numerous and may have been divided into three branches, the Anafesti, Ordelaffi, and Dodoni.

It was one of the most centrally connected of Venetian families. Four members were among the first colonists of Venetian Crete. Their descendants took the Greek name Phalieros (Φαλιέρος).

== Members ==
The family produced three Doges of Venice:

- Vitale Faliero, Doge of Venice from 1084 until 1096
- Ordelafo Faliero, Doge of Venice from 1102 until 1117, married to Matelda Faliero
- Marino Faliero, Doge of Venice from 1354 until 1355, executed for the Faliero coup, married to Alucia Falier

Other famous members include:

- Bonifacio Falier, bishop of Castello (1120–1133)
- Vitale Falier (fl. 1152–1172), diplomat
- Benedetto Falier, patriarch of Grado (1201–1207)
- Leonardo Falier, Latin patriarch of Constantinople (1302–1305)
- Marinos Phalieros (died 1474), writer
- Domenico Falier (1492–1564)
- Giovanni Falier (16th century), medallist
- Luca Falier (1545–1614)
- Francesco Falier (1557–1614)
- Giovanni Falier (1637–1681)

== See also ==
- Palazzo Falier

== Sources ==
- Ravegnani, Giorgio (2017). Il traditore di Venezia: Vita di Marino Falier doge (in Italian). Bari and Rome: Editori Laterza. ISBN 978-88-581-2715-5.
