= Marino Faliero =

Doge of Venice from 1354 to 1355

His Serenity Marino Faliero
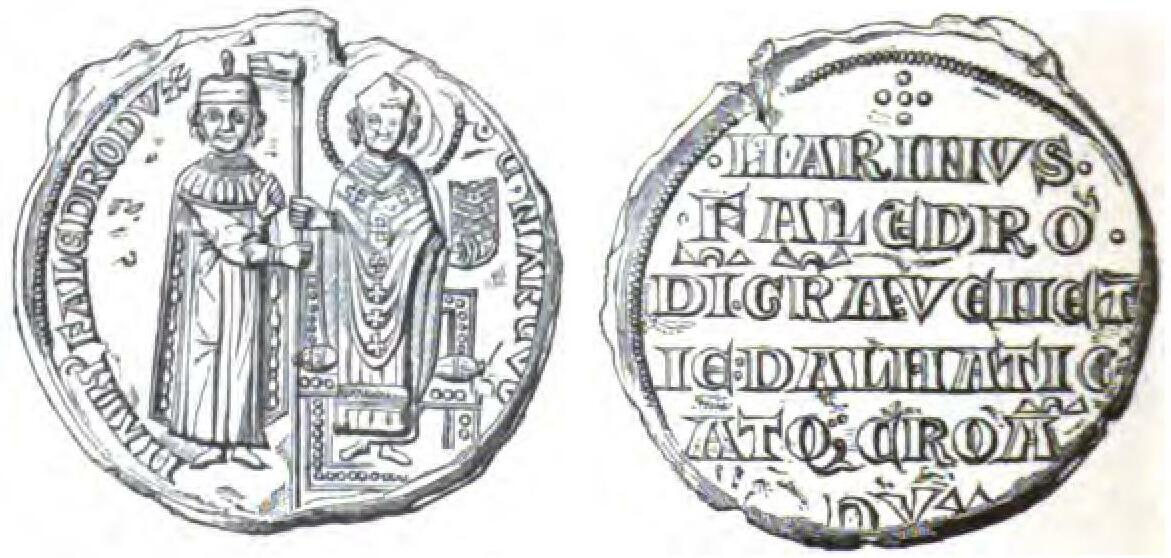
- Seal with portrait of Marino Faliero

55th Doge of Venice
- In office 11 September 1354 – 15 April 1355
- Preceded by: Andrea Dandolo
- Succeeded by: Giovanni Gradenigo

Personal details
- Born: c. 1274 Venice, Venetian Republic
- Died: 17 April 1355 (aged 81) Venice, Venetian Republic
- Spouse(s): NA. Contarini; Alvica Gradenigo
- Children: 2
- Parent(s): Jacopo Faliero; Beriola Loredan
- Profession: Patrician, statesman

Marino Faliero (Venetian: Marin Falier, c. 1274 – 17 April 1355) was the 55th Doge of Venice from 11 September 1354 to 15 April 1355, 2 days before his execution for attempting a coup d'état.

Faliero was born into one of the most ancient Venetian patrician families and held various state positions, including several military appointments, governorships, and ambassadorships. He was already eighty years old at the time of his election as doge. The reasons for his involvement in a coup attempt to overthrow Venice's republican government and install himself as prince are not entirely clear. According to a later tradition, Faliero attempted the coup as vengeance for an insult against his younger wife by a patrician, who was lightly punished. However, modern historians often dismiss this tradition and argue that Faliero wanted to secure Venice's survival by establishing autocratic rule, which had become the norm outside of Venice.

A painting of a black shroud with the words "This is the place of Marino Faliero, beheaded for crimes" hangs in the Great Council Hall of Venice among the portraits of the doges. Faliero's coup attempt has been depicted in several works of art, including plays, paintings, and an opera.

== Origin and family ==
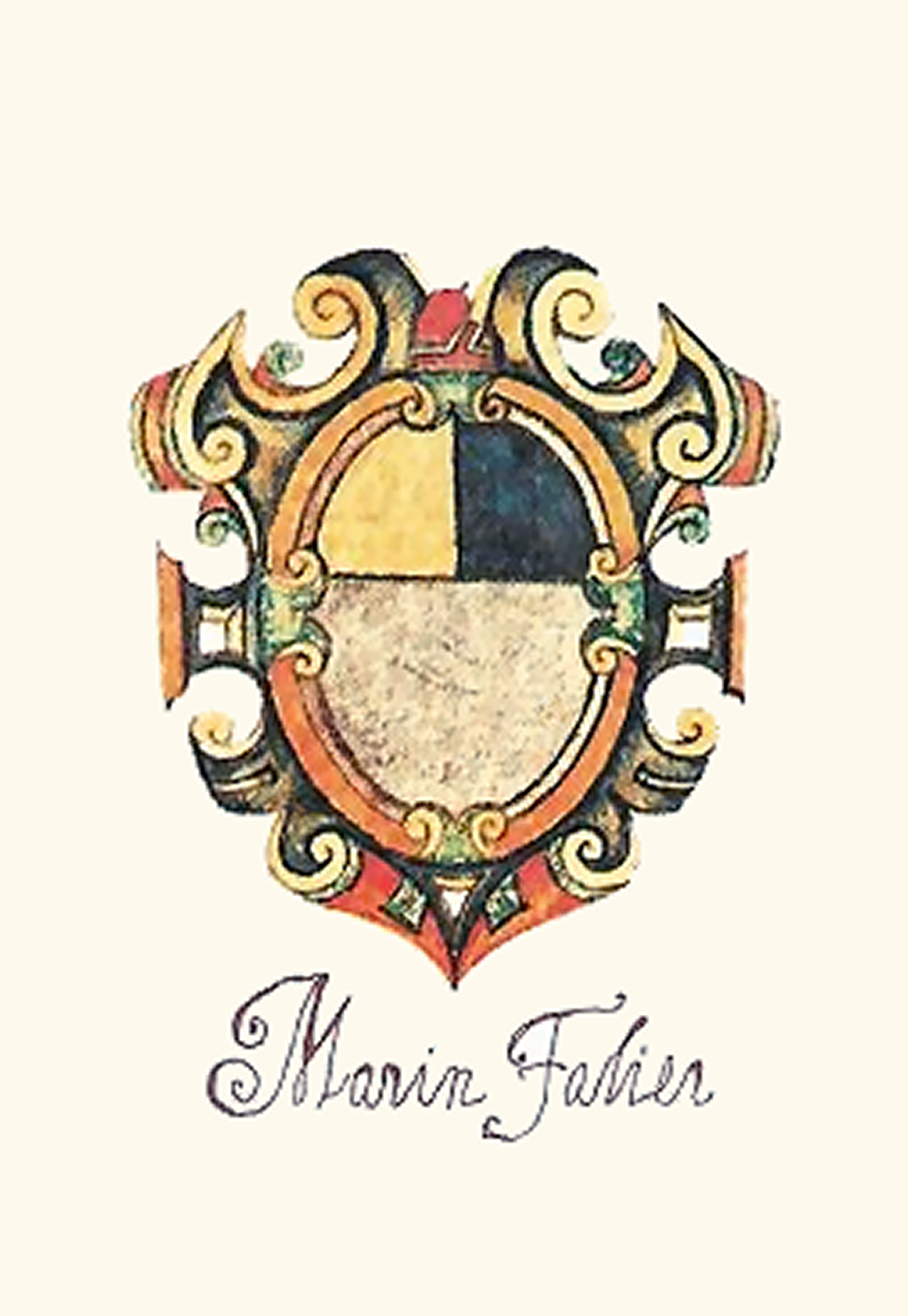
Coat of arms of Marino Faliero

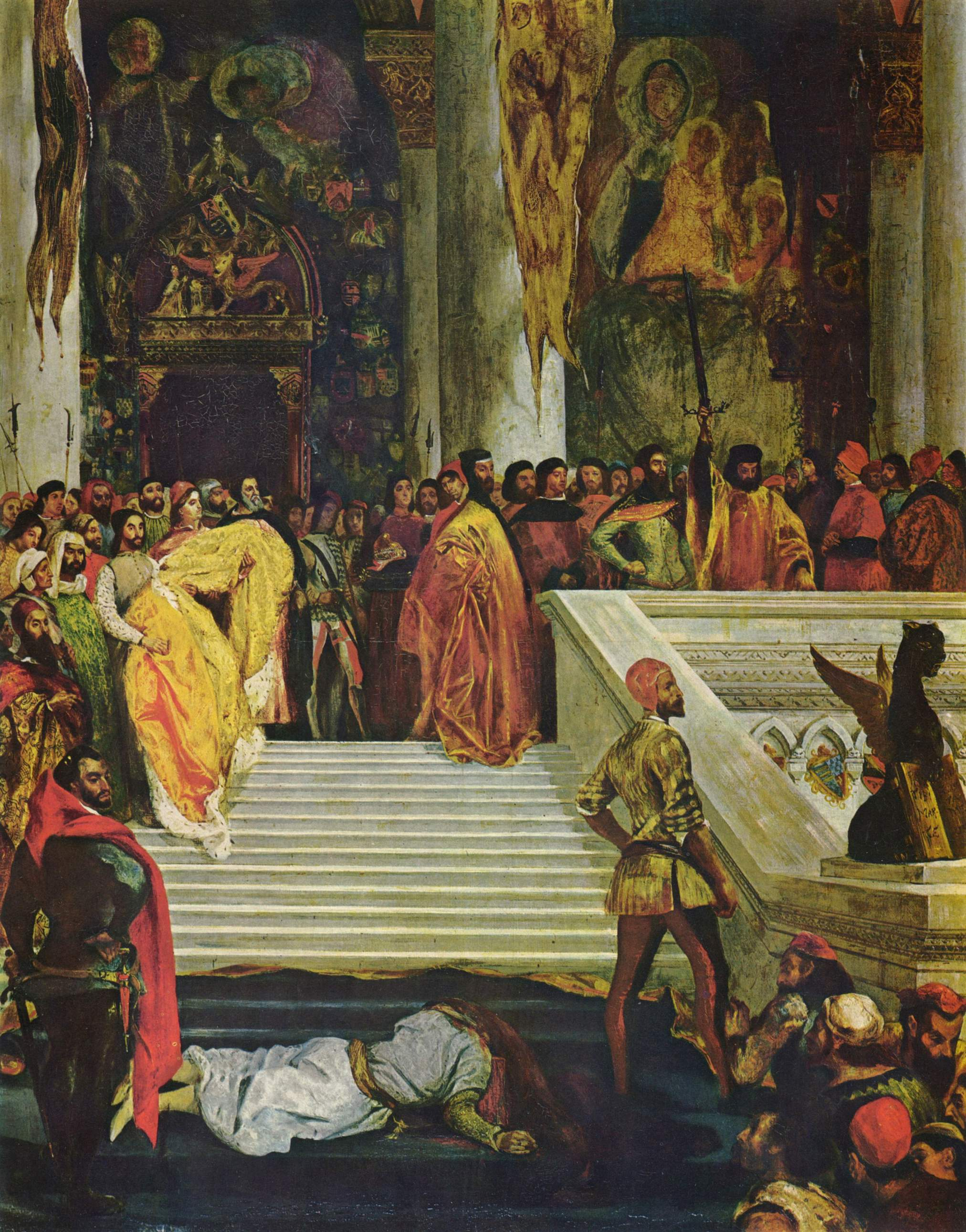
The Execution of Marino Faliero, by Eugène Delacroix (1827, Wallace Collection).

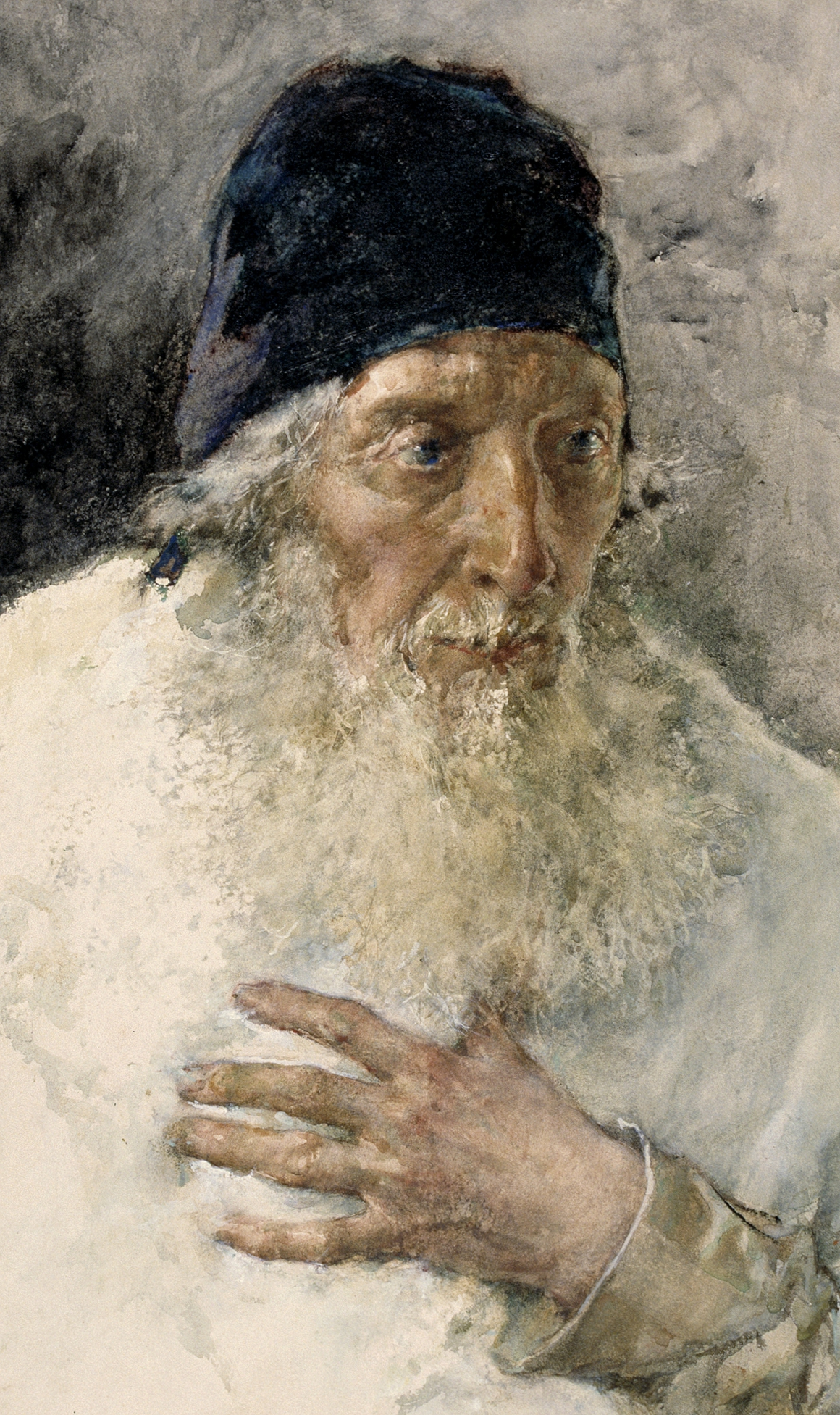
Marino Faliero, Dux LV by Francisco Pradilla Ortiz (1883, Museo del Prado).

Marino Faliero was born c. 1274, the son of Jacopo Faliero and Beriola of the Loredan family. Marino had three brothers, Ordelaffo, Marco, and Jacopo, and a sister, Francesca. The Faliero family was one of the oldest in the Venetian patriciate; legend traced its origins to the myths surrounding the foundation of Venice itself in Late Antiquity. By the 14th century, it was counted among the twelve most prestigious, so-called "apostolic" noble families.

Marino married twice. The name of his first wife, who died sometime before 1328, is unknown, but she may have been a member of the Contarini family (the same as his grandmother's). The couple had numerous children: Lucia, Marco, Nicoletto, Maddalena, Andriota, Caterina, and Tommasina. His second marriage, in 1335, was to the much younger Alvica Gradenigo, a granddaughter of Doge Pietro Gradenigo (r. 1289–1311). This marriage was childless.

== Early career ==
The Faliero family had many branches, and many of its members shared the same name, which makes distinguishing them difficult for modern historians. At the time of Marino's early life, there were two other namesakes: a remote cousin who died shortly after 1320, and a paternal uncle, who died around 1330. As a result, information about Marino Faliero's early career is certain only after 1330.

=== Service in the Council of Ten and overseas ===
Faliero's first known public post is attested in October 1315, when he was one of the three heads (capi) of the Council of Ten, convened to examine the case of a sympathizer of the failed 1310 Tiepolo conspiracy. Faliero's own role during the 1310 events is nowhere mentioned, but from his later appointment, it appears that he supported the victorious loyalist side. Faliero continued as a member of the council until 1320 and held the office of head of the Ten as well as state inquisitor several times during this period. In early 1320, he was charged with Andrea Michiel to organize the killing of Bajamonte Tiepolo and Pietro Querini, the only two leaders of the conspiracy still at large.

From then until 1323, Faliero's activities are unknown, other than records of mercantile activity in 1321 and early 1323. In April of the latter year, he was named bailo (governor) and captain (military commandant) of Negroponte (Euboea), a Venetian-ruled island in the Aegean Sea. In 1326, he was again in Venice as a member of the Council of Ten, but in May of the following year, he left for Bologna on a diplomatic mission along with Marco Michiel to the prior of the Servites who had a dispute with Venice. Back again in Venice, he again served in the Ten; he left shortly after to be elected to the police board of the Five Elders to Peace (cinque anziani alla pace). He is next mentioned in a number of private deeds in 1329, and was elected to the Council of Ten in August of the same year, and again at the start of 1330.

In 1333, Faliero became captain of the galleys destined for the Black Sea and of Constantinople, his first known military posting. His task was the protection of the merchant ships going to Tanais. He was back in Venice by 31 October, when he was tasked with examining the affairs of the East, notably the reports sent to Venice by the—largely Venetian-sponsored—Holy League and from Negroponte, as well as serving in commissions on the matters of navigation in the East. In early 1334 Faliero was elected as podestà (governor) of the Dalmatian island of Lesina (Hvar). He remained at this post from early March 1334 to late June 1335. In July, he was a member of a commission examining letters from Hélion de Villeneuve, the Grand Master of the Knights Hospitaller, and a month later of a commission concerning correspondence with King James III of Majorca. During the same time, he also married his second wife, Alvica Gradenigo. In November 1335 Faliero was elected as a savio agli ordini, a member of the board tasked with naval affairs.

=== Governorships and ambassadorships ===
With the Scaliger War looming, in May 1336, Faliero was a member of a commission sent to supervise the defence of the former Caminesi lands annexed by Venice. He then served as one of the two Venetian members (along with two Florentine ones) in the council assisting the anti-Scaliger alliance's captain-general, Pietro de' Rossi, until late autumn 1336. From 1 May 1337 to 28 February 1338 he served as podestà of Chioggia, immediately on the next day assuming his post as podestà of Padua, which had only recently been freed from Scaliger rule and was now a protectorate of Venice and Florence. Faliero held the post until February 1339, and during this time he cooperated with the city's lord, Ubertino I da Carrara, in a comprehensive overhaul of the Paduan statutes to secure the position of the new Carraresi regime and its ruling family. Among the reforms was a revision of the eligibility criteria for the Paduan Great Council that echoed Venice's own Serrata of 1297, by making membership more restrictive and founded on a hereditary basis.

Elected as the first Venetian podestà of Treviso on 26 January 1339, Faliero took up his new post on 11 February, holding it until December of that year. During the next year he was a member of various commissions of 'wise men' (savi) on diverse issues, domestic as well as foreign, ranging from preparations in Dalmatia for a possible war with King Louis I of Hungary to an examination of usury practices, or supervising road construction in Venice. From May 1341 to January 1342 he served as podestà of Serravalle, followed by a second term as podestà of Chioggia from April 1342 to April 1343, although his actual tenure was shorter, since in March he was recalled to Venice for consultations. During the following months, he played a role in resolving the legal disputes of the former Caminesi lords; acting as guarantor in an agreement between Gherardo V da Camino and Rizzardo VII da Camino and the Bishop of Ceneda, Faliero was rewarded by the former with ownership of the castle of Fregona. In spring 1344 Faliero was sent as envoy, along with Andrea Corner, to Pope Clement VI in Avignon. The mission, to receive papal permission to trade with Alexandria—ruled by the Mamluk Sultanate and thus normally prohibited for Christian merchants (Note: In October 1308, Pope Clement V forbade all commerce with the Mamluks, a prohibition reinforced in 1312 when the Knights of Rhodes were commissioned to capture any Christian vessel violating the ban. Both Venice and Genoa stopped all publicly-funded expeditions to Mamluk ports, but private ventures to Egypt continued until prohibited by the Venetian government in 1324.)—was a success. During his absence, Faliero was elected again podestà of Chioggia, a post which was filled by his brother Ordelaffo until Marino returned from Avignon. He remained in this post till 1 May 1345.

In September, Faliero was briefly part of a commission dealing with the revolt of Zara (Zadar), the chief Venetian possession in Dalmatia. On 20 November, Faliero was designated captain of the naval forces against Zara, but this was soon altered to a six-month command of the land forces ten days later, a move of uncertain legality as Faliero had already accepted the previous appointment. He never seems to have exercised this command, however, and on 14 January 1346 he was again named captain of the sea. Sailing to Zara with a fleet, he arrived there at the end of February, but already in March was obliged to subordinate himself to Pietro Civran, who arrived at the scene with another Venetian fleet as commander-in-chief of all naval forces. With the defeat of a relief attempt by King Louis I of Hungary in early July, the military situation dramatically shifted in favour of the Venetians, and by the end of the same month, Faliero was back in Venice. From 4 August 1346 to 4 August 1347, Faliero served a second term as podestà of Treviso.

In November 1347, Faliero was a member of a commission to examine correspondence with Louis I of Hungary, before going for a second term as podestà to Serravalle in the next year. In the meantime, Venice was devastated by the Black Death, which killed his brother, Ordelaffo. While still at Serravalle, on 24 September 1348, Faliero was elected captain-general of the land forces against the city of Capodistria (Koper), which had revolted against Venetian rule. By the time he arrived in Venice and began preparations, however, the revolt was already subdued, and he only went to Capodistria as a commissioner in November, to ensure its defence and examine how the revenue derived from it could be increased. In February–April 1349, as savio agli ordini, he was charged with the Republic's deteriorating relationship with its traditional rival, the Republic of Genoa, which would soon lead to the outbreak of the Third Genoese–Venetian War. He was then sent as envoy to the papal legate, Guy de Montfort, on the issue of the accumulated arrears, due to the plague and the imminent war with Genoa, of the decima dei morti, the tithe that ought to be paid to the Church from the property of deceased Venetians. Neither Faliero nor his eventual successors could resolve the matter, which festered and poisoned the Republic's relations with the Church for decades.

By May 1349, Faliero was again serving an annual term as podestà of Chioggia. In July the same year, in a ceremony at Ceneda, he was invested with the fief of Valmareno, which was ceded by Rizzardo VII da Camino in exchange for a loan from the Republic. In May 1350, he served on a board on the affairs of Dalmatia, was briefly again envoy to the papal legate, and in June was appointed to the five-member commission examining relations with Genoa. Elected ambassador to the Duke of Austria, Albert II, Faliero was eventually replaced in this task and sent instead to an embassy to Genoa, in hopes of averting the imminent conflict. The decree of his appointment makes clear the high hopes vested in him, claiming that "our fates are largely entrusted in the person of the ambassador". He was given ample remit to conclude an agreement as he saw fit, or to refer the matter to papal arbitration. Officially confirmed on 31 July, Faliero set out, but already on 2 August, he received messages that instructed him to stay put, and then to turn back, leaving only his secretary, Amadeo, to continue with the mission. The reason for this was news received in Venice that Venetian citizens had been killed by the Genoese in the Black Sea. Even though newer messages confirmed this not to be the case, the subsequent proposals for Faliero to continue his journey, or for another ambassador to be sent in his stead, fell through, making war inevitable.

In 1352, Faliero was sent on a diplomatic mission and met with the Bulgarian tsar Ivan Alexander in Nicopolis, giving him a letter from the doge Andrea Dandolo.

== Doge of Venice ==
Faliero was a naval and military commander and then a diplomat before being elected doge in succession to Andrea Dandolo. He learned of his election while he was on a diplomatic mission to the papal court at Avignon. The populace of Venice was at that time disenchanted with the ruling aristocrats who were blamed for a recent naval defeat by the fleet of the Republic of Genoa at the 1354 Battle of Portolungo during the Third Venetian–Genoese War.

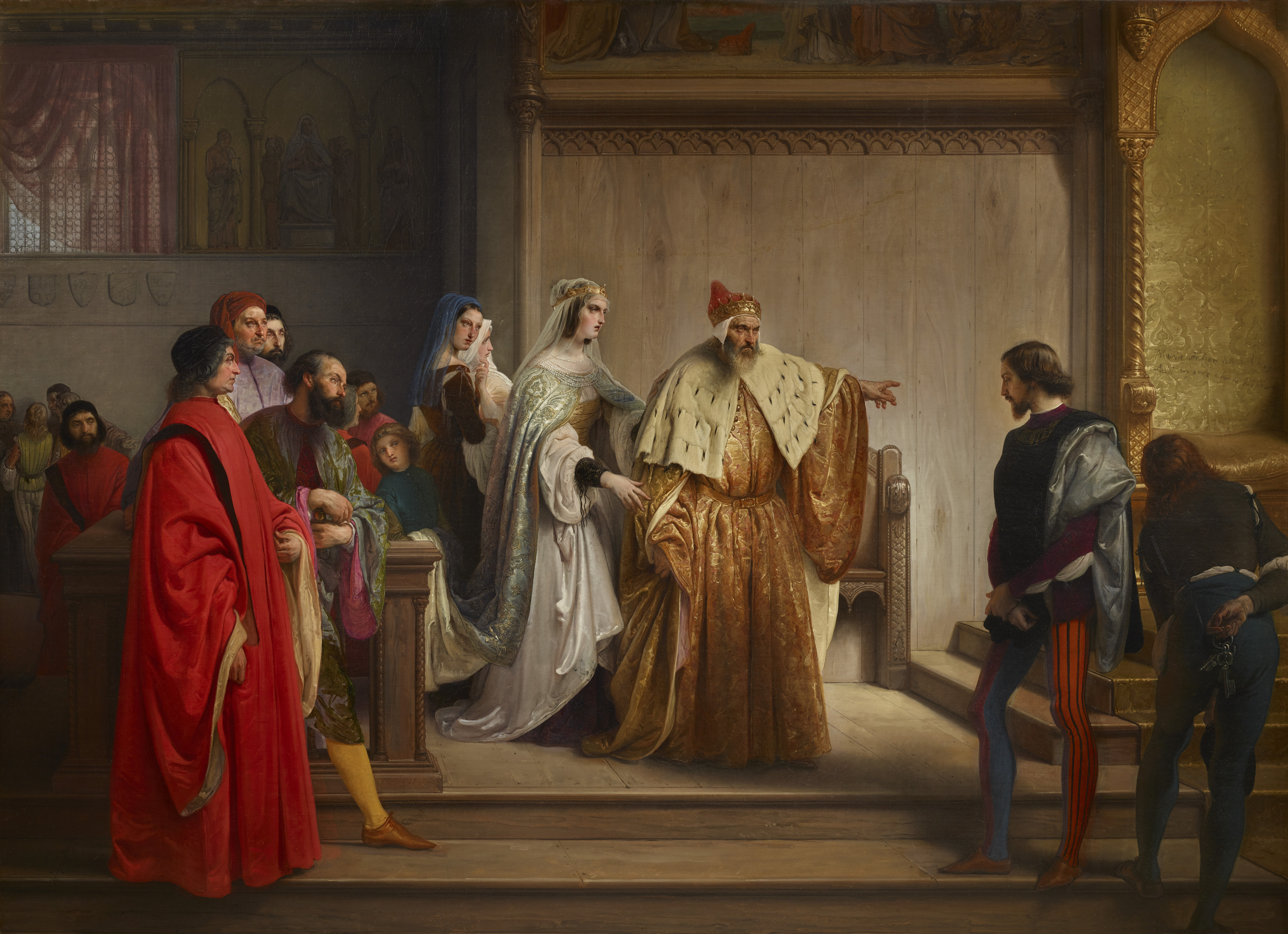
Doge Marino Falier accusing Michele Steno of responsibility for the inscription insulting him and the Dogaressa (1844), by Francesco Hayez

Within months of being elected, Faliero attempted a coup d'etat in April 1355, aiming to take effective power from the ruling aristocrats. According to tradition, this came about because the dogaressa, Faliero's second wife, Aluycia Gradenigo, had been insulted by Michele Steno, a member of an aristocratic family. Modern historians often dismiss this tradition and instead connect Faliero's actions with his diplomatic career: they suggest that Faliero saw the predominance of strong autocrats abroad, as opposed to Venice's republican system. His experiences and Venice's recent defeat by the Genoese may have led him to conclude that only autocratic rule could secure Venice's future. However, Faliero gave no such explanation during his trial following the failure of the coup attempt. Thomas F. Madden writes that Faliero's display of repentance at his trial was "just what one might expect from a man who had been so enraged by arrogant mockery against himself and his wife that he rashly set forces in motion that he could not control." Frederic C. Lane states that Faliero's main motivation may not have been to become a despot but rather to realize the goals of "the die-hards of a war party" dissatisfied with the peace with Genoa.

The plot intended to murder the chief patricians on 15 April and proclaim Faliero prince of Venice. It was badly organised, with poor communication between the conspirators, and was quickly discovered thanks to some of the conspirators having made revelations. The Council of Ten proceeded to arrest the ringleaders and to place armed guards all over the town. Several of the conspirators were condemned to death, and others to various terms of imprisonment. Faliero pleaded guilty to all charges and was beheaded on 17 April and his body mutilated. Ten additional ringleaders were hanged on display from the Doge's Palace in Piazza San Marco.

== Legacy ==
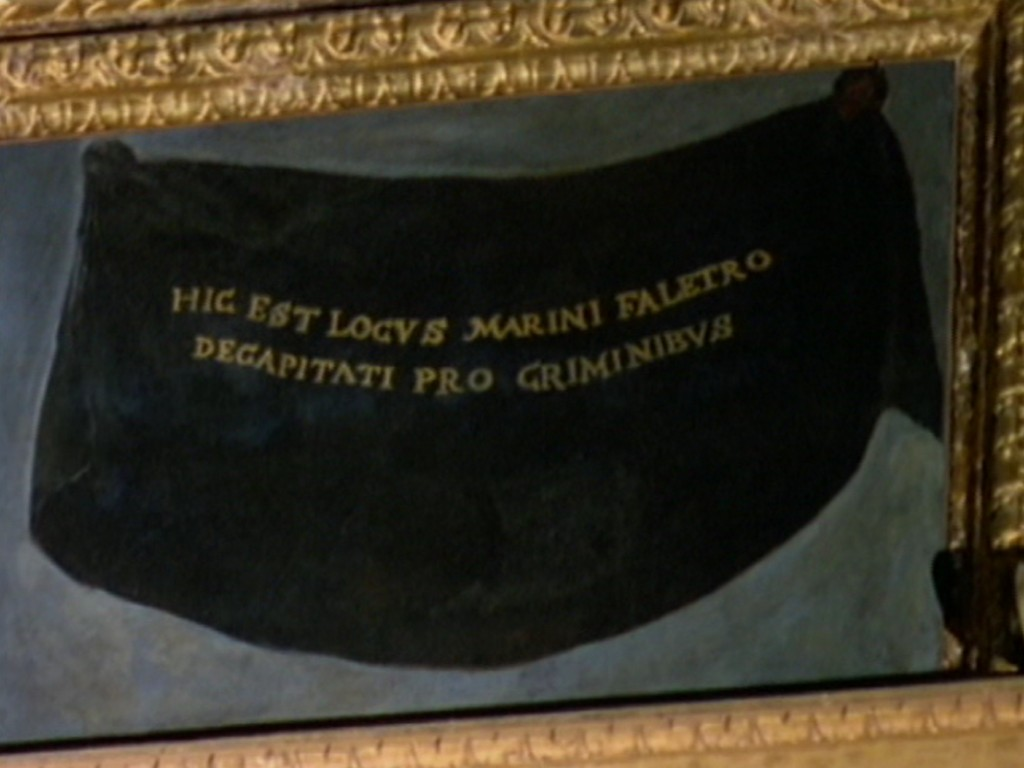
Faliero's picture in the Great Council Hall. The black shroud painted in its place bears the Latin phrase, "This is the space for Marino Faliero, beheaded for his crimes."

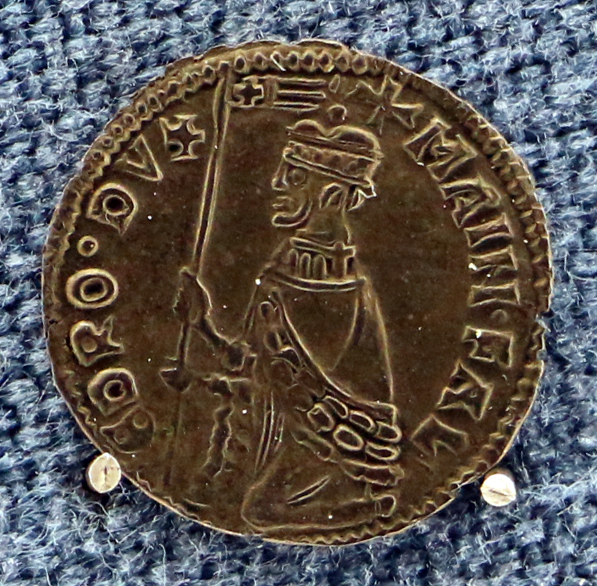
Coin with Marino Faliero portrait

Faliero was condemned to damnatio memoriae, and accordingly, his portrait, displayed in the Sala del Maggior Consiglio (Hall of the Great Council) in the Doge's Palace, was omitted and the space painted over with a black shroud, which can still be seen in the hall today. A Latin language inscription on the painted shroud reads: Hic est locus Marini Faletro, decapitati pro criminibus ("This is the space for Marino Faliero, beheaded for his crimes").

The story of Faliero's failed plot was later made into plays by Lord Byron (Marino Faliero, Doge of Venice in 1821) and Casimir Delavigne (in 1829). Delavigne's play was adapted into an eponymous opera scored by Gaetano Donizetti in 1835. All three present the traditional story that Faliero was acting to defend his wife's honour. Prussian author E. T. A. Hoffmann used a different approach in his 1818 novella Doge und Dogaresse; German composer Robert Schumann contemplated writing an opera based on Hoffmann's story. Eugène Delacroix's 1826 painting The Execution of the Doge Marino Faliero is based on Lord Byron's play.

His home, Palazzo Falier, still exists in Venice, being one of the oldest structures there.

== Bibliography ==
- Ashbrook, William (1992). "Marino Faliero". In Sadie, Stanley (ed.). The New Grove Dictionary of Opera, Volume Three: Lon-Rod. London: Macmillan Press Ltd. p. 218. ISBN 0-333-48552-1.
- Balard, Michel (2017). "La lotta contro Genova". Gênes et la mer - Genova e il mare. Vol. II. Genoa: Società Ligure di Storia Patria. pp. 575–645. ISBN 978-88-97099-42-0.
- Grignola, Antonella (1999). The Doges of Venice. Venice: Demetra. ISBN 9788844014131.
- Kohl, Benjamin G. (1998). Padua under the Carrara, 1318–1405. Baltimore and London: Johns Hopkins University Press. ISBN 0-8018-5703-1.
- Lane, Frederic C. (1973). Venice: A Maritime Republic. Baltimore: Johns Hopkins University Press.
- Madden, Thomas F. (2013). Venice: A New History. New York: Penguin Books. ISBN 978-0-14-750980-2.
- Norwich, John Julius (2003) [1977]. A History of Venice. London: Penguin. ISBN 978-0-14-101383-1.
- Ravegnani, Giorgio (2017). Il traditore di Venezia: Vita di Marino Falier doge (in Italian). Bari and Rome: Editori Laterza. ISBN 978-88-581-2715-5.
- Romano, Dennis (2024). Venice: The Remarkable History of the Lagoon City. Oxford and New York: Oxford University Press. ISBN 978-0-19085998-5.
- Rossi, Franco (2002). "Gradenigo, Aluica". Dizionario Biografico degli Italiani (in Italian). Vol. 58: Gonzales–Graziani. Rome: Istituto dell'Enciclopedia Italiana. ISBN 978-88-12-00032-6.

Political offices
Preceded by Andrea Dandolo	Doge of Venice; 1354–1355	Succeeded by Giovanni Gradenigo
