= The Execution of the Doge Marino Faliero =

Painting by Eugène Delacroix

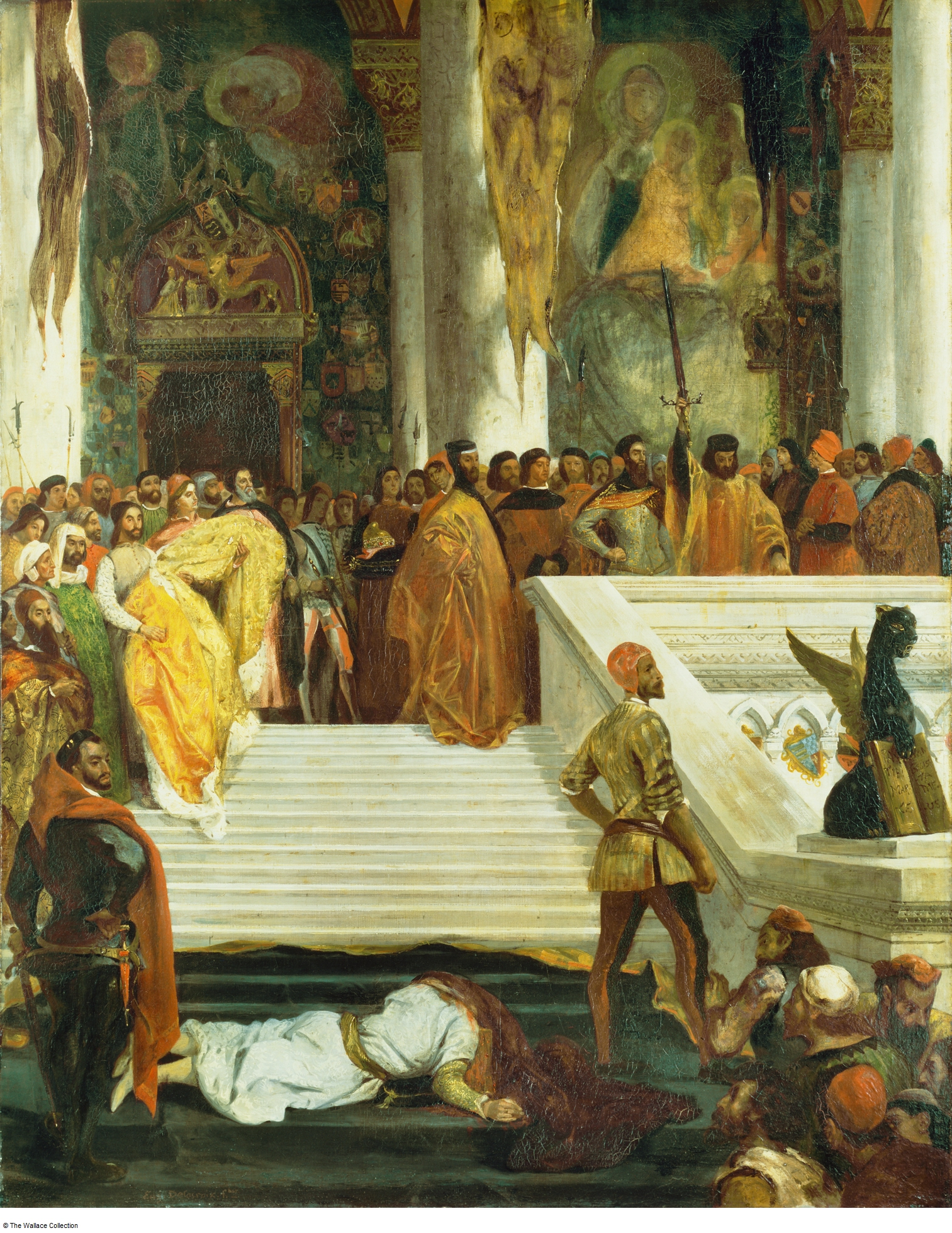
- Artist: Eugène Delacroix
- Year: 1825–1826
- Medium: Oil on canvas
- Dimensions: 145.6 cm × 113.8 cm (57.3 in × 44.8 in)
- Location: Wallace Collection, London
- Accession: P282

The Execution of the Doge Marino Faliero is an oil painting on canvas completed in 1826 by the French Romantic artist Eugène Delacroix, inspired by the 1821 play Marino Faliero, Doge of Venice by Lord Byron, which in turn was based upon events in the life of the Venetian Doge Marino Faliero (1274–1355). Today the work is part of the Wallace Collection in London. The painting is characterized by its fragmented and variegated composition, which departs from traditional history-painting conventions. Due to the work's unusual arrangement of figures, architectural motifs, theatrical references, and political significance, it has generated scholarly attention.

== Compositional elements and analysis ==
The painting depicts the immediate aftermath of the beheading of Faliero, which had taken place on the Scala dei Giganti (Giant's Staircase) of the Doge's Palace. The staircase, where Marino was also inaugurated as doge, is located within the interior of the building rather than facing out into St Mark's Square. While Faliero's now headless body lies at the bottom of the escarpment clad in white after having been stripped of his ducal vestments, members of the Council of Ten and other Venetian aristocrats in fine, brightly coloured garments are gathered atop it, including one member of the Council of Ten who holds up the sword which was used to behead Faliero, pointing it to the Christ wall-painting above. In the background, walls of the loggia are dressed in flags and wall-paintings of religious subjects (such as the Virgin and Saint Mark). The other side of the blank staircase represents a more socially mixed group, where two individuals hold the doge’s yellow robe (which had been removed prior to the onset of the execution). To the left of Faliero’s corpse, the executioner stands in profile. To the right of the corpse is an armed guard, who is blockading the onlookers.

Delacroix’s pictorial narrative illustrates a moment just after the climax of the event itself, emphasizing the aftermath of the horrific event rather than its onset. Alexander Potts describes Marino Faliero as looking like “a little collage,” as if composed of “several distinct, relatively flattened motifs.” Potts relates the scattered arrangement of the figures (such as the doge's body, his costume, and the executioner) to the distinct moment that Delacroix represents, with the unifying event (represented by the execution itself) having already passed. Considering the dynamic nature of the painting, Potts states that the central tension of the scene becomes diluted. To achieve the final effect, Delacroix implemented unique artistic maneuvers. Marc Gotlieb describes it as Delacroix finding “an occasion to make his own subject dissolve into decor.” Delacroix’s distinctive mode of expression was not met with applause; in fact, many critics such as Maxime Du Camp criticized this approach for giving “equal value to each of the objects, from the actual human fingers to tapestries to the coats of arms that emblazon the drapes”.

== Historical context and prevailing political ambience ==
The painting has been discussed as a commentary on the Bourbon Dynasty in France under the rule of Charles X. Doge Marino Faliero was a former military hero who was convicted of conspiracy against the state. Faliero conspired with a collective of Venetian commoners in the city of Genoa (then at war with Venice) to carry out a complete overthrow of the noble oligarchy ruling the Republic as well as to slaughter the Venetian nobility. Given this background, scholars believe it is important to consider how Delacroix’s contemporary audience may have related the narrative to their time. For example, the public grappled with deeply rooted post-revolutionary anxiety (promulgated by Bourbon succession after Louis XVIII’s death) about the possibility of political betrayal and conspiracy against the state. Additionally, many viewers were troubled by the grotesque violence of public executions as a whole.

== Theatrical background ==
Delacroix visually portrays the final moments of Lord Byron’s drama: the deed is done, the doors of the palace are thrown open, and the crowd rushes in as the Senate hails the restoration of justice.” However, Byron’s theatrical influence extends beyond solely the setting of Delacroix’s work. Specifically, the positioning of the executed doge himself is typically discussed by art historians from a theatrical lens. In Lord Byron’s drama, the final stage direction dictated that: “The gory head rolls down the Giants’ Steps”. However, upon close examination, the head itself is nowhere to be found. Instead, it is just the doge’s corpse that is sprawled on the stairs. This deviation (between Byron’s theatrical script and Delacroix’s artistic execution) raises questions about whether or not Delacroix leaned on outside influences to serve as a source of inspiration. Potts poses a question to reflect upon: “If we were to pursue the suggestion to 'see the tragedy by Byron,' would this mean that we should be able to delve further into the meaning of the painting, as if making sense of it were a never-ending process?"

== Critical reception ==
The work received mixed responses. It was first reviewed by Ludovic Vitet in Le Globe in 1826 when the work was first shown at the Exposition en bénéfice des Grecs in 1826. Vitet faulted the work for poor drawing and use of color. Auguste Jal reviewed the work when it was shown at the Salon in 1827. Jal praised the design of the white staircase and its prominence, comparing it to medieval woodcuts. He additionally speculated that Delacroix would soon move away from the small-scale and mannered technique, which was heavily imitated at the time. Neither reviewer compared the work with Byron’s play, instead relating it to history and Bourbon propaganda.

== Artistic style and influences ==
The painting's dramatic character can additionally be linked to hints of Gothic Aesthetism and attributed to Delacroix’s fascination with Gothic horror (which is traced back to his teenage years). Orientalist accents are also present throughout the painting, especially in the Venetian setting and the Turkish executioner.

Classical conventions prioritize balanced and harmonious artworks where compositions depict idealized forms and actions (via structure and symmetry), centered around a fixed number of figures. However, Delacroix departed from this set of rules by illustrating an enigmatic and dynamic scene. Rather than illustrating a central action such as the execution of Faliero, Delacroix highlights the psychological confrontation between the Venetian nobility and the people. The grand staircase serves as a physical element that separates the two groups and underlines the manner in which Delacroix blends historical events with Romantic drama.

George Mras summarizes how Delacroix embraces atmospheric ambiguity: "By relinquishing Classical ideals of order, measure, and perfection, in favor of exaggerations and lapses from correctness, modern art (i.e., post-Antique art) achieved a new and equally valid mode of expression in which vague, intangible, and fundamentally inexplicable content becomes the prime concern of the artist." Delacroix’s attention to spectator engagement further highlights his adherence to Romantic focus on emotional and imaginative effects. Delacroix, according to Lee Johnson, “preserved his attempt to make sketchlike technique an expressive device—a visual stimulus intended to activate the spectator's imagination into creative response".
