= Vitale Faliero =

Doge of Venice from 1084 until 1095

- Dux Venetiae atque Dalmatiae • Protosebastos
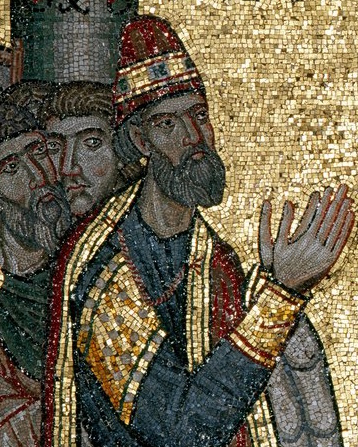
- Detail of Vitale Faliero from The Discover the Urn of Saint Mark (Southern transept of St Mark's Basilica, 13th century)

Doge of Venice
- Reign: December 1084 – December 1095 or 1096
- Predecessor: Domenico Selvo
- Successor: Vitale I Michiel
- Born: c. 1025; Venice, Republic of Venice
- Died: December 1095 or 1096 (aged c. 75-76); Venice, Republic of Venice
- Burial: 25 December; St. Mark's Basilica
- Spouse: Cornelia Bembo (?)
- Issue: Unnamed daughter; Ordelafo Faliero (?); Luchino Faliero (?); Angelo Faliero (?)
Names
- Vitale Faliero de' Doni
- House: Faliero
- Father: Angelo Faliero (?)
- Mother: Candiana Sanudo (?)

Vitale Faliero (Venetian: Vidal Falier, Latin: Vitalis Faledro, c. 1025 – December 1095 or 1096), also known as Vitale Faliero de' Doni, was a Venetian nobleman and statesman who reigned as the Doge of Venice from 1084 until his death. He was the 32nd Doge in the traditional numbering.

His dogeship was marked by both foreign-policy successes and growing domestic difficulties, which intensified in his final years and ultimately threatened his position. At the beginning of his rule, Venice consolidated its influence in the Adriatic, while the expansion of the Normans in southern Italy was temporarily checked. The Doge sought to maintain a neutral position in the conflict between the reform papacy under Pope Gregory VII and the Emperor Henry IV. In 1094, the purported rediscovery of the relics of Saint Mark further enhanced the importance of St Mark's Basilica. The newly renovated basilica was visited in 1095 by Henry IV, who acted as godfather at the baptism of one of the Doge's daughters. On this occasion, Henry granted Venice a wide-ranging commercial privilege within the Empire. Together with the privilege granted to Venetian merchants in the Byzantine Empire in 1082, which largely exempted them from customs duties, this concession helped lay the foundations for Venice's growing commercial dominance in the eastern Mediterranean.

== Biography ==
=== Early life ===
Vitale Faliero was born in Venice during the first half of the 11th century. He belonged to the Faliero family, one of the oldest and most prominent Venetian families, which was already listed among the antiquiores et nobiliores Veneticos in a list of noble Venetian families compiled around the middle of the 10th century. Faliero belonged to a branch of the family known by the byname de' Doni, also recorded in the forms Dedonis, Dedoni, and Dodoni. The byname appears in contemporary documents associated with several members of the Faliero family. A ducal document of 1094, for example, records Giovanni Faliero de' Doni, who served as a counsellor to the doge, as well as a Domenico Faliero de' Doni, Domenico Faliero, and Costantino Faliero. The exact significance of the byname is uncertain.

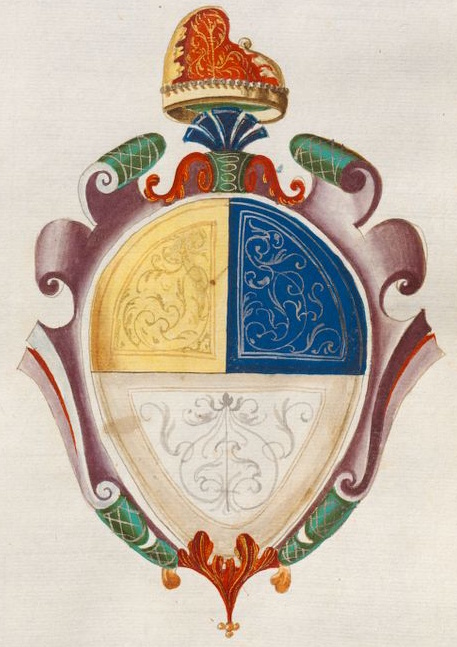
Coat of Arms of the House of Faliero

Little is known about Faliero's parents, childhood, or early career. Later genealogical traditions identify him as the son of Angelo, a procurator of St Mark, and Candiana Sanudo, daughter of Vitale Sanudo. The Faliero family was traditionally said to have originated in Fano before moving to Padua and eventually Venice, although this origin is not supported by sufficient contemporary evidence. Faliero's parentage is likewise not securely established, and the identification of Angelo and Candiana as his parents cannot be confirmed from surviving contemporary documents.

Later chronicles, including the Origo civitatum and the chronicle of doge Andrea Dandolo, identify the future doge Ordelafo Faliero as Faliero's son. This parentage is not conclusively established by the surviving contemporary evidence. Later genealogical tradition, recorded by Marco Barbaro, identifies Faliero's wife as Cornelia Bembo and attributes to the couple three sons, Luchino, Angelo, and Ordelafo; of these, only the identification of Ordelafo as Faliero's son is also found in the earlier chronicles. Barbaro also attributed an unnamed brother to Faliero, although neither this relationship nor the other genealogical claims can be independently confirmed from contemporary documents. Faliero is certainly known to have had at least one daughter, whose baptismal godfather was the Emperor Henry IV. Maria Faliero, who later became abbess of the monastery of San Zaccaria, was also a relative of Faliero.

Nothing is known with certainty about Faliero's career before his election as doge in 1084. He may have served as a consiliarius, a close counsellor of the doge, before attaining the ducal office.

=== Dogeship ===
Faliero succeeded Domenico Selvo as doge in December 1084, following Selvo's deposition after the Venetian defeat against the Normans. The principal foreign-policy problems facing Venice were the war with the Normans and the relationship with the Byzantine Empire, followed by the question of Venice's position in the conflict between Pope Gregory VII and the Holy Roman Emperor Henry IV, known as the Investiture Controversy.

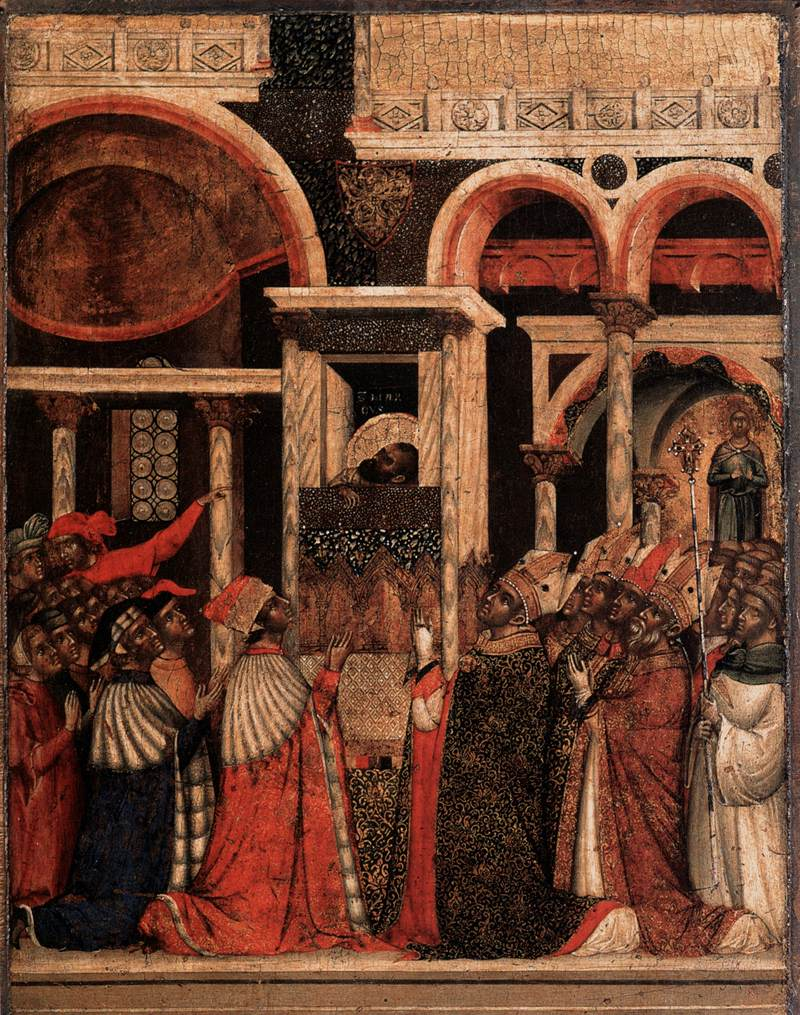
Vitale Faliero depicted kneeling in The Miraculous Discovery of the Body of Saint Mark (Paolo Veneziano, St Mark's Basilica, 1345)

==== Relations with Byzantium and the Normans ====
The election of Faliero took place in the aftermath of the Norman invasion of the Byzantine Empire. Under Robert Guiscard, the Normans had occupied Corfu in 1081 and besieged Durazzo, prompting the Venetians to intervene in support of the Byzantine Emperor Alexios I Komnenos. The Venetian fleet initially achieved several successes, but suffered a severe defeat against the Normans in the autumn of 1084, with substantial losses of ships and men. The defeat contributed to the deposition of Domenico Selvo. The conflict was brought to an end soon after Faliero's accession. The Norman army was weakened by an epidemic, which affected both Bohemond, the son of Robert Guiscard, and Guiscard himself. Guiscard died near Cephalonia in July 1085, effectively ending the Norman offensive against Byzantium. The Venetian intervention nevertheless had important long-term consequences for the Republic's commercial position.

In return for Venetian assistance against the Normans, Alexios I had granted Venice extensive commercial privileges in the Byzantine Empire in 1082. These privileges were confirmed and implemented during Faliero's dogeship. Venetian merchants were granted freedom of trade throughout the Byzantine Empire, including Constantinople, together with three commercial stations near the Golden Horn, warehouses, workshops, and other facilities. The privileges also provided financial benefits to Venetian churches. The Byzantine emperor had also granted the doge and his successors the title of protosebastos.

According to doge Andrea Dandolo, Alexios I also granted Faliero authority over Dalmatia and Croatia, after which the doge supposedly adopted the title dux Venetiarum atque Dalmaciae et Chroatiae. The Kingdom of Croatia had fallen into political decline a few years before Faliero's accession, and following the Hungarian invasion of Croatia, Venice's interests in the coastal cities were increasingly threatened. A Byzantine recognition of Venetian claims over these territories would therefore have been politically advantageous. However, the claim that Faliero received authority over Croatia from Alexios I is difficult to verify. As demonstrated by several historians, Faliero does not use the title et Chroatiae in any surviving contemporary document; the title is instead attested for his successor, Vitale I Michiel.

==== Relations with Henry IV ====
During the Investiture Controversy, Venice had initially attempted to maintain a neutral position. Its alliance with Byzantium and conflict with the Normans, however, brought the Republic closer to the opponents of the papacy, since the Normans were allies of the pope. Faliero subsequently developed close relations with the Holy Roman Emperor Henry IV. In March 1095, Henry was at Padua and in June at Mestre, where he granted a privilege to the Venetian monastery of San Zaccaria. Later that year, while Henry was staying at Treviso, a Venetian delegation invited him to Venice. The emperor travelled to the city and acted as godfather at the baptism of Faliero's daughter. He subsequently renewed Venice's existing pactum and confirmed its privileges, adding the right for Venetian merchants to store goods originating from the Holy Roman Empire, in exchange for an annual tribute.

The emperor, who had been excommunicated and was facing a difficult political situation in northern Italy, had an interest in strengthening his relations with Venice. Faliero's government therefore marked a period of particularly close relations between the Republic and the Empire. In 1094, during the period of growing political tension in northern Italy, Faliero also ordered the fortification of Loreo on the Adige, the southernmost defensive position of the Venetian dogado.

==== Reconstruction of St Mark's Basilica ====
During Faliero's dogeship, the reconstruction of St Mark's Basilica was completed. The church, whose rebuilding had begun under doge Domenico I Contarini and continued under Domenico Selvo, was transformed into a large basilica with a Greek-cross plan and domes, inspired by the Church of the Holy Apostles in Constantinople.

On 8 October 1094, the relics of Saint Mark were transferred to the newly completed crypt. According to later tradition, the location of the relics had been forgotten after an earlier fire, but they were miraculously rediscovered during the reconstruction of the basilica. One tradition states that a structural collapse revealed the container holding the evangelist's body, leading to its recovery and the subsequent translation of the relics. The completion of the basilica and the rediscovery of the relics became important elements in the development of Venice's religious and political identity.

==== Final years and death ====
The final years of Faliero's dogeship were marked by a series of natural disasters and social unrest. Contemporary and later accounts describe earthquakes, storms, famine, and popular disturbances that placed considerable pressure on the Venetian population. Faliero died in Venice during this period of unrest. The exact year of his death is uncertain. Historian Roberto Cessi places it in December 1095, while the Venetian chronicles give differing lengths for his reign, leading other historians to date his death to 1096. He was buried in the atrium of St Mark's Basilica, probably on Christmas Day.

His tomb is the oldest surviving ducal burial in St Mark's Basilica, although its present form probably dates from the 13th century. A later tradition claimed that, during the famine, an angry mob opened Faliero's tomb and threw pieces of bread at his coffin, blaming him for the suffering. This account is generally regarded as a later legend rather than a reliable description of the events surrounding his death.

== Legacy ==
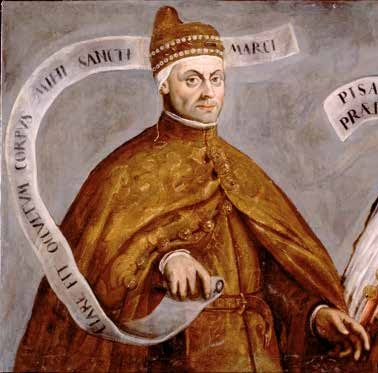
Faliero's portrait in the Doge's Palace

Vitale Faliero is depicted in the posthumous series of official portraits of the doges of Venice in the Doge's Palace. The original gallery was established in the 1360s under doge Marco Cornaro as a chronological sequence of Venetian rulers, each shown holding a scroll inscribed with a summary of his achievements. After the original paintings were destroyed in the fire of 1577, the series was recreated, with Domenico Tintoretto executing most of the surviving portraits. The scroll held by Vitale Faliero contains the following inscription in latin:

CLARE FIT OCCULTUM CORPUS MIHI SANCTI MARCI

[The hidden body of Saint Mark was revealed to me clearly.]

== See also ==
- Faliero
- List of doges of Venice

== Sources ==
- Rendina, Claudio (1989). I dogi. Storia e segreti. Rome: Newton Compton.

== Notes ==
Political offices
Preceded by Domenico Selvo	Doge of Venice; 1084–1095	Succeeded by Vital I Michele
