= Michele Steno =

Doge of Venice from 1400 to 1413

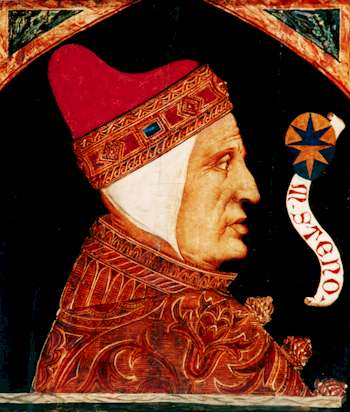
- Contemporary portrait of Michele Steno, today at the Muzeum Sztuki in Łódź

Doge of Venice
- In office 1400–1413
- Preceded by: Antonio Venier
- Succeeded by: Tommaso Mocenigo

Personal details
- Born: 1331 Venice, Republic of Venice
- Died: 26 December 1413 (aged 81–82) Venice, Republic of Venice
- Spouse: Marina Galina

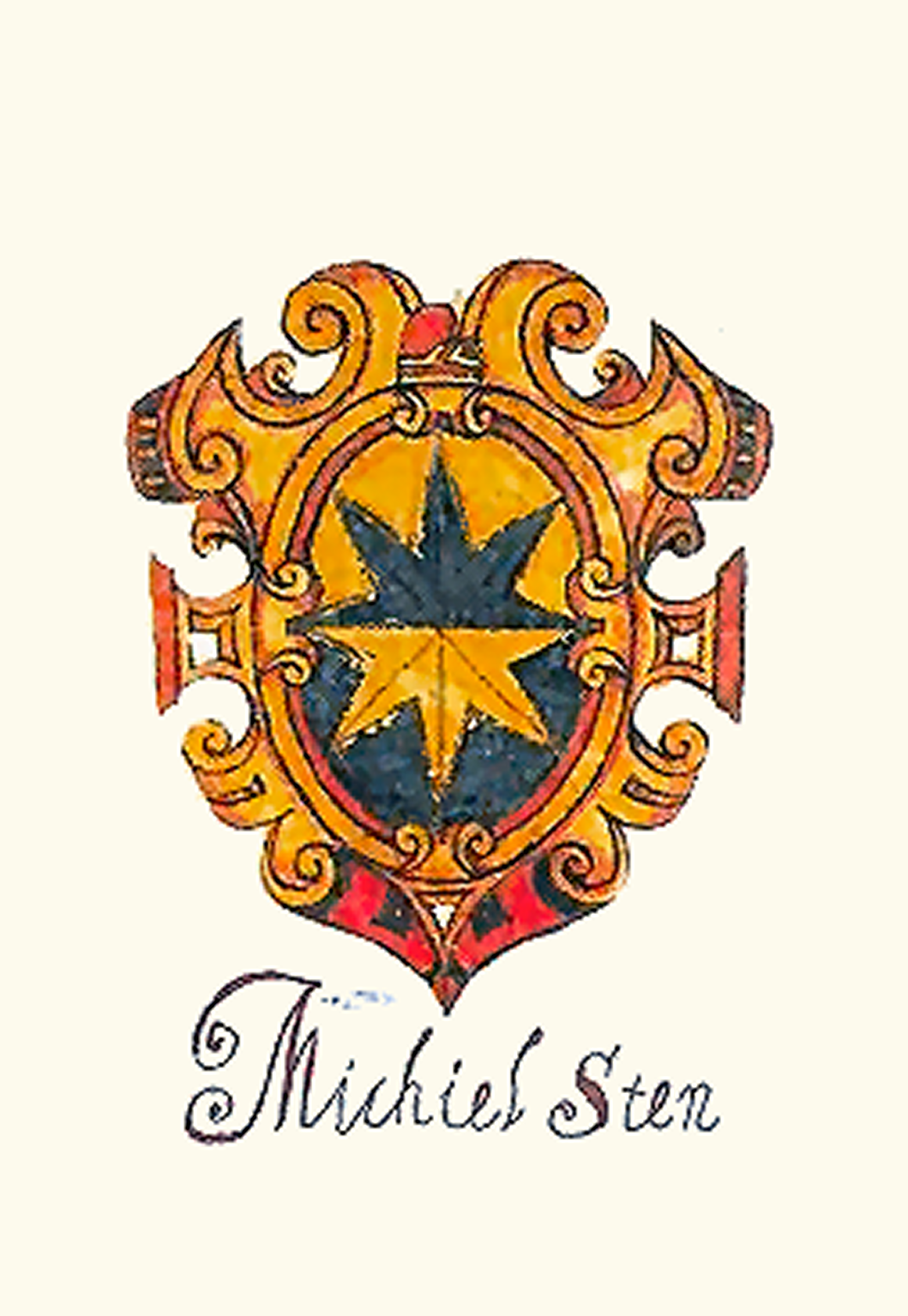
Coat of arms of Michele Steno

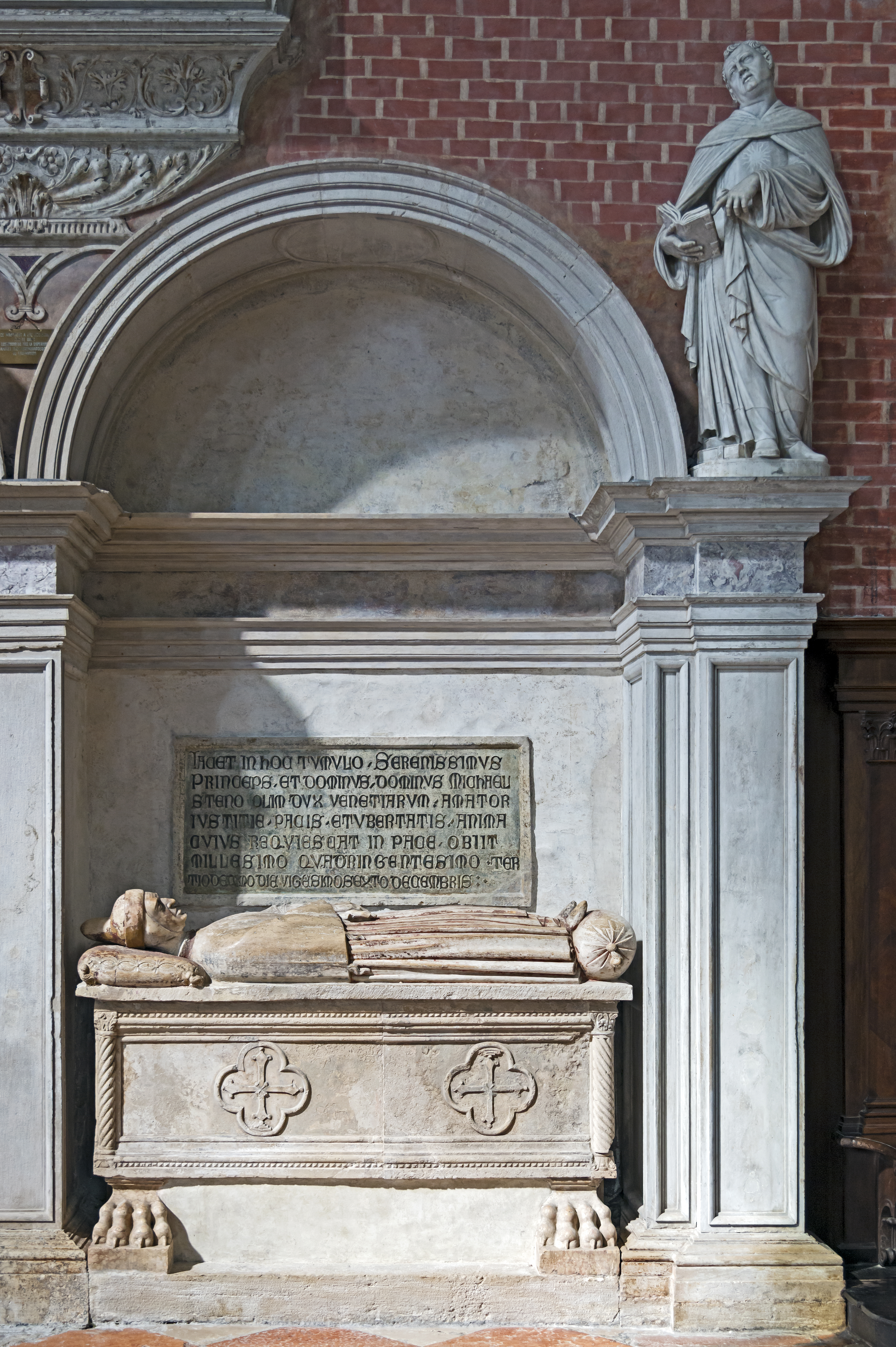
His tomb in Venice.

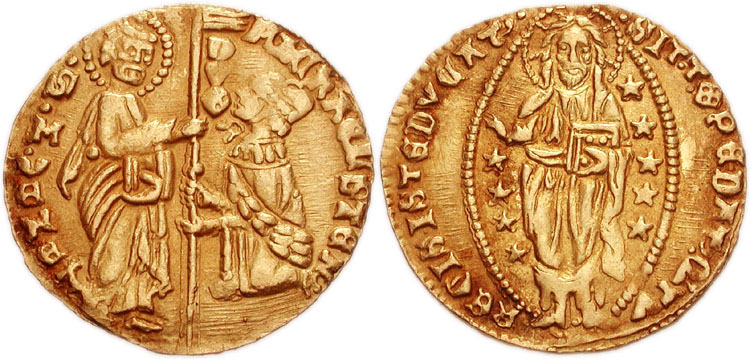
A ducat mint under Michele Steno (1400).

Michele Steno (Michiel Sten in Venetian Language; 1331 – 26 December 1413) was a Venetian statesman who served as the 63rd Doge of Venice from 1 December 1400 until his death. He is remembered as the ruler crucial for establishing the Domini di Terraferma, in the aftermath of the War of Padua.

== Biography ==
Steno was born in Venice into a family of some, though not great, wealth, and had lived a dissolute life in youth; he and a number of other young men were at one point nearly executed by the government for covering the Doge Marino Faliero's throne with "ignominious" inscriptions against him and his spouse, Aluycia Gradenigo. He later served as proveditor of Venice, and proved a capable diplomat.

In 1400 he was elected as doge as a compromise choice, since previous votes had become deadlocked. Upon becoming Doge he took to dressing like Lorenzo Celsi, who had been known for his elegance of dress. In his accession's year, Venice begun a successful war against Padua and its lord, Francesco da Carrara, leading to a substantial expansion of the republic in the Italian mainland. During the Christian schism of 1408, Venice sided with Pope Alexander V.

An old and ill man in his late years, Steno died in 1413, and was interred in the Basilica di San Giovanni e Paolo, a traditional burial place of the doges.

Steno was succeeded as Doge by Tommaso Mocenigo.

== Cultural references ==
Michele Steno is honored as the dedicatee of Johannes Ciconia's motet, "Venecia, mundi splendor/Michael, qui Stena domus," probably on the occasion of Padua's submission to Venetian rule. Among other rhetorical flourishes, the text praises Michele for his celibate life (vitam celibem).

Political offices
Preceded by Antonio Venier	Doge of Venice; 1400–1413	Succeeded by Tommaso Mocenigo
