= Alucia Falier =

Dogaressa of Venice

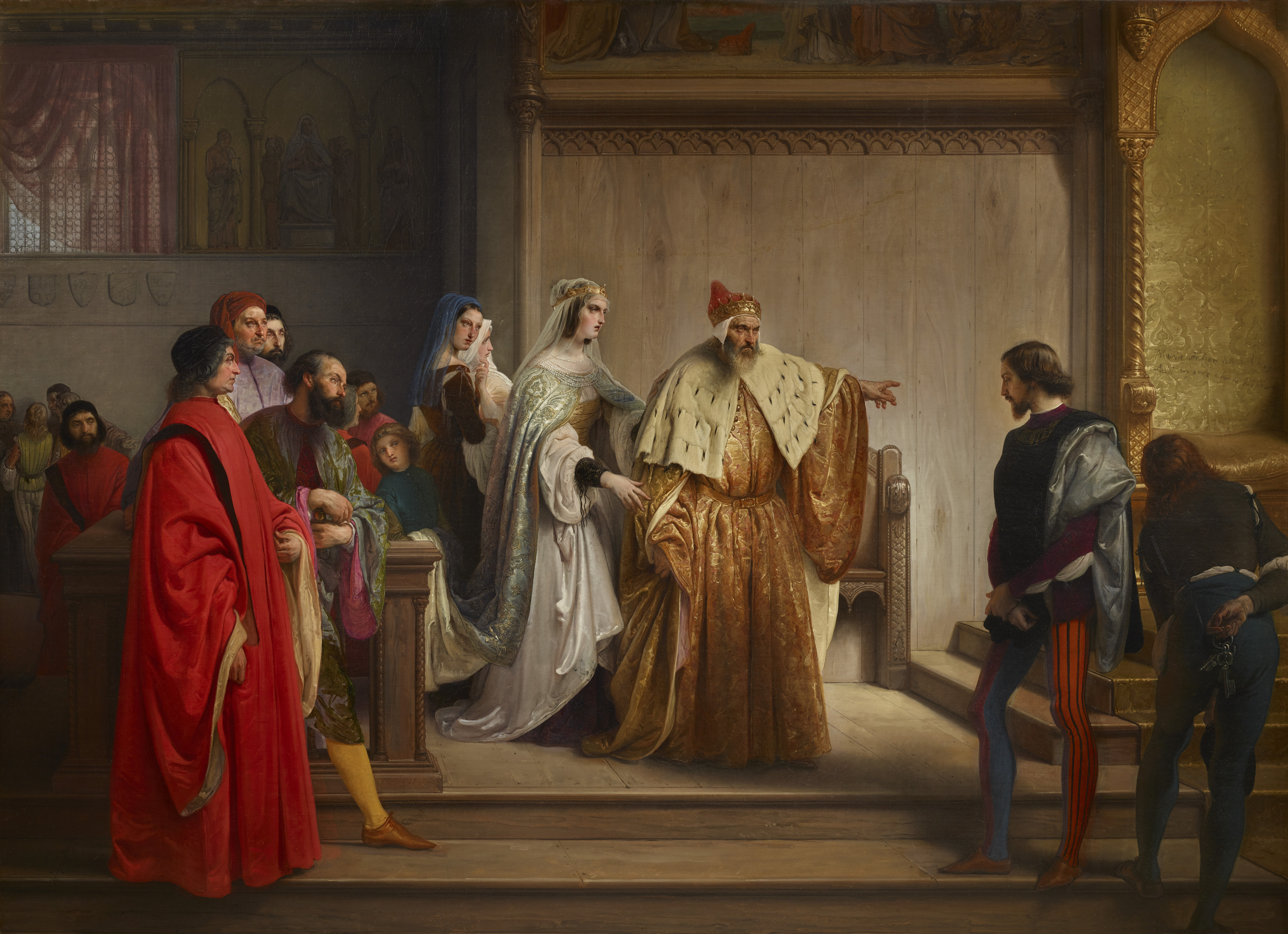
Fictional portrayal of Alucia and her husband by Francesco Hayez

Alucia (or Alvica) Gradenigo Falier (died 1387) was the dogaressa of the Republic of Venice as the wife of Doge Marino Falier from 1354 to 1355.

Alucia was a member of the noble Gradenigo family and was a granddaughter of Doge Pietro Gradenigo. Her parents were Fiordelise and Nicolo Gradenigo. She was born by 1309, when she is mentioned in her grandfather's will. She had married Marino by 1335. She was his second wife after Tommasina Contarini. They had no children.

When, after less than a year in office, Marino Falier was implicated in a coup to overthrow the republic, he was arrested and executed. Most of his estates, including his main residence, the Palazzo Falier, and his assets were seized, but he was allowed to make a limited will with Alucia as executor. The Council of Ten absolved her of responsibility for the plot and returned to her her dowry of 4,000 lire.

In retirement, Alucia was called "former dogaressa" in documents. She spent her long widowhood in Verona and the convent of San Lorenzo. Her sizeable dowry permitted her to engage in trade and give out loans to friends. She petitioned the Council of Ten on more than one occasion for the return of wrongly confiscated goods. In 1356, she received back some gold jewellery. In 1357, she and her sister Engoldise received 6.5 lire for some of their mother's property that had been taken. In accordance with terms imposed on her husband's will, much of his wealth had to be given to the church and the poor. In 1358 and 1362, she gave the government receipts attesting to this.

Alucia settled in the parish of San Severo in the 1370s, "one the wealthiest single women in the city." She made a will for the first time in 1384, leaving bequests for the monasteries, schools and hospitals of the city, as well as family members, servants and individual nuns. She made a second will, now lost, in 1385.

Alucia's third and final will was drawn up in February 1387. She left almost her entire estate to her two nieces, the daughters of Engoldise. This decision, she claimed, was made "with much stimulus given me from the large and continuous pestering given me continuously by relatives and others." She died before January 1388, when the will was being challenged. In 1389, the Avogadori di Comun and the Council of Forty agreed with the challengers that Alucia had not been of sound mind in her final months when the third will was made and that the notary had been negligent.

Marinio Falier's attempted coup has spawned many retellings, but the role of Alucia is usually heavily fictionalized. She is usually portrayed as very young when she was at least 45 years old in 1354. She also plays a central role in the coup, which is a response to insults against her. In his Marino Faliero, Doge of Venice, Lord Byron renames her Angiolina. Casimir Delavigne calls her Annunziata and E. T. A. Hoffmann, in his novella Doge und Dogaresse, calls her Elena.

== Bibliography ==
- Hurlburt, Holly S. (2006). The Dogaressa of Venice, 1200–1500: Wife and Icon. Springer.
- Ravegnani, Giorgio (1994). "Falier, Marino". Dizionario Biografico degli Italiani (in Italian). Vol. 44: Fabron–Farina. Rome: Istituto dell'Enciclopedia Italiana. ISBN 978-88-12-00032-6.
- Rossi, Franco (2002). "Gradenigo, Aluica". Dizionario Biografico degli Italiani (in Italian). Vol. 58: Gonzales–Graziani. Rome: Istituto dell'Enciclopedia Italiana. ISBN 978-88-12-00032-6.
- Secrétant, G. (1913). "Una calunnia secolare, Alvica Falier Gradenigo". Rivista di Roma. 17: 13–20.
