= Palazzo Falier =

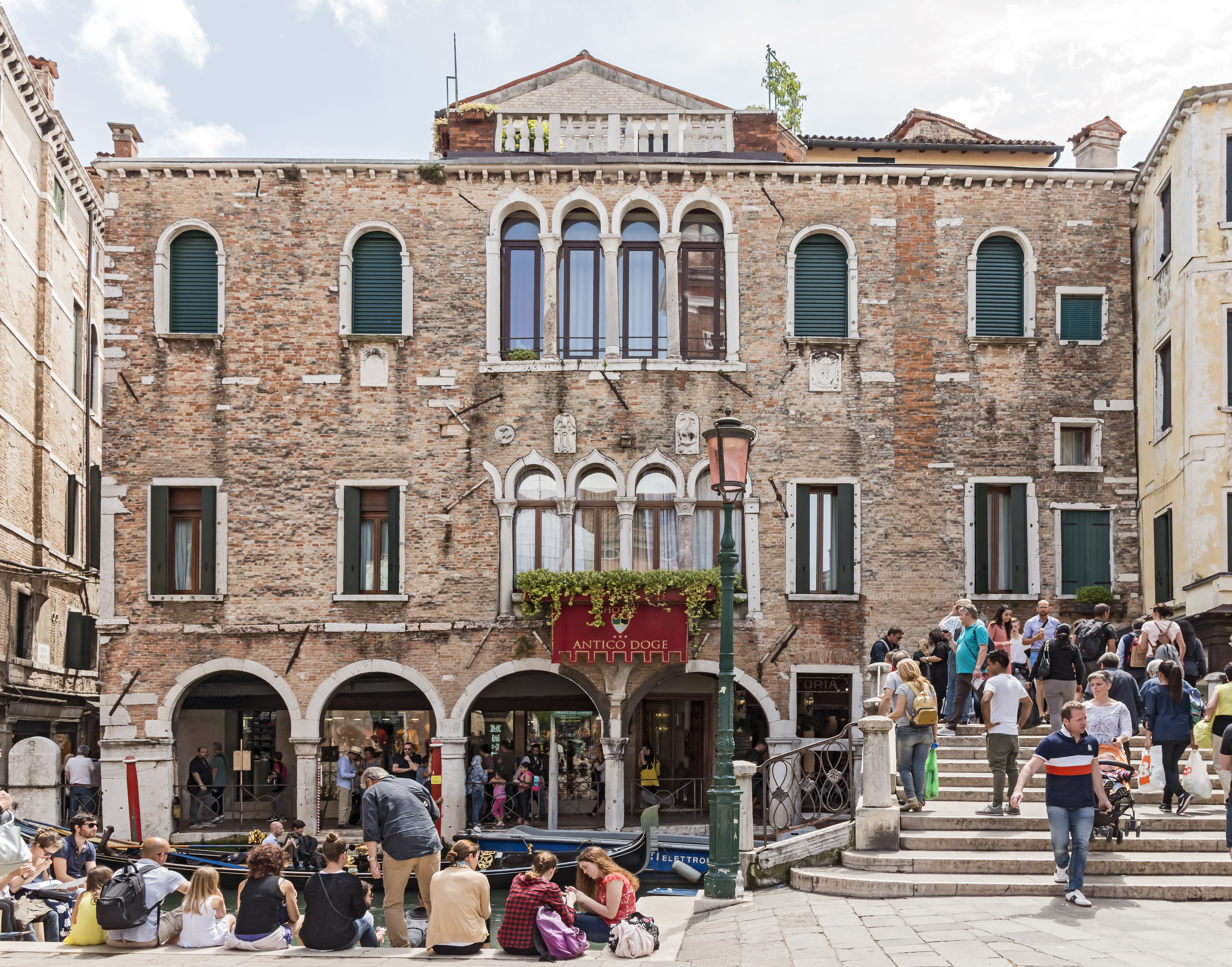
- Palace Falier, façade on Rio dei Santi Apostoli.
- Interactive map of the Palazzo Falier area

General information
- Type: Residential
- Architectural style: Byzantine
- Location: Cannaregio district, Venice, Italy
- Coordinates: 45°26′23.79″N 12°20′11.66″E
- Construction stopped: 12th century

Technical details
- Floor count: 3

Palazzo Falier is a civil building located in Venice, Italy in the Cannaregio district. The palazzo is particularly known for having been the home of Marin Falier, Doge of the Republic of Venice, who was executed for attempting a coup d'état.

== History ==
The palace is one of the oldest existing buildings in Venice. Erected in a primitive form during the 11th century, the palace was destroyed by fire and rebuilt in 1105. Later, the structure was a subject of numerous alterations, which partially changed its structure. Currently, the first floor is home to a hotel business.

== Architecture ==
The palazzo stands on a characteristic arcade of six arches, parallel to Rio dei Santi Apostoli and monumentally overlooking the adjacent campo. The façade is an example of the Byzantine influence on Venetian architecture and presents very ancient elements, among which the two raised, loosely stacked corbels. The decorations date back to the 13th and 15th centuries: two panels, two paterae and two Gothic shields. The two noble floors have quadriforas. Initially they were pentaforas, but the leftmost arches have been bricked up.

== Gallery ==
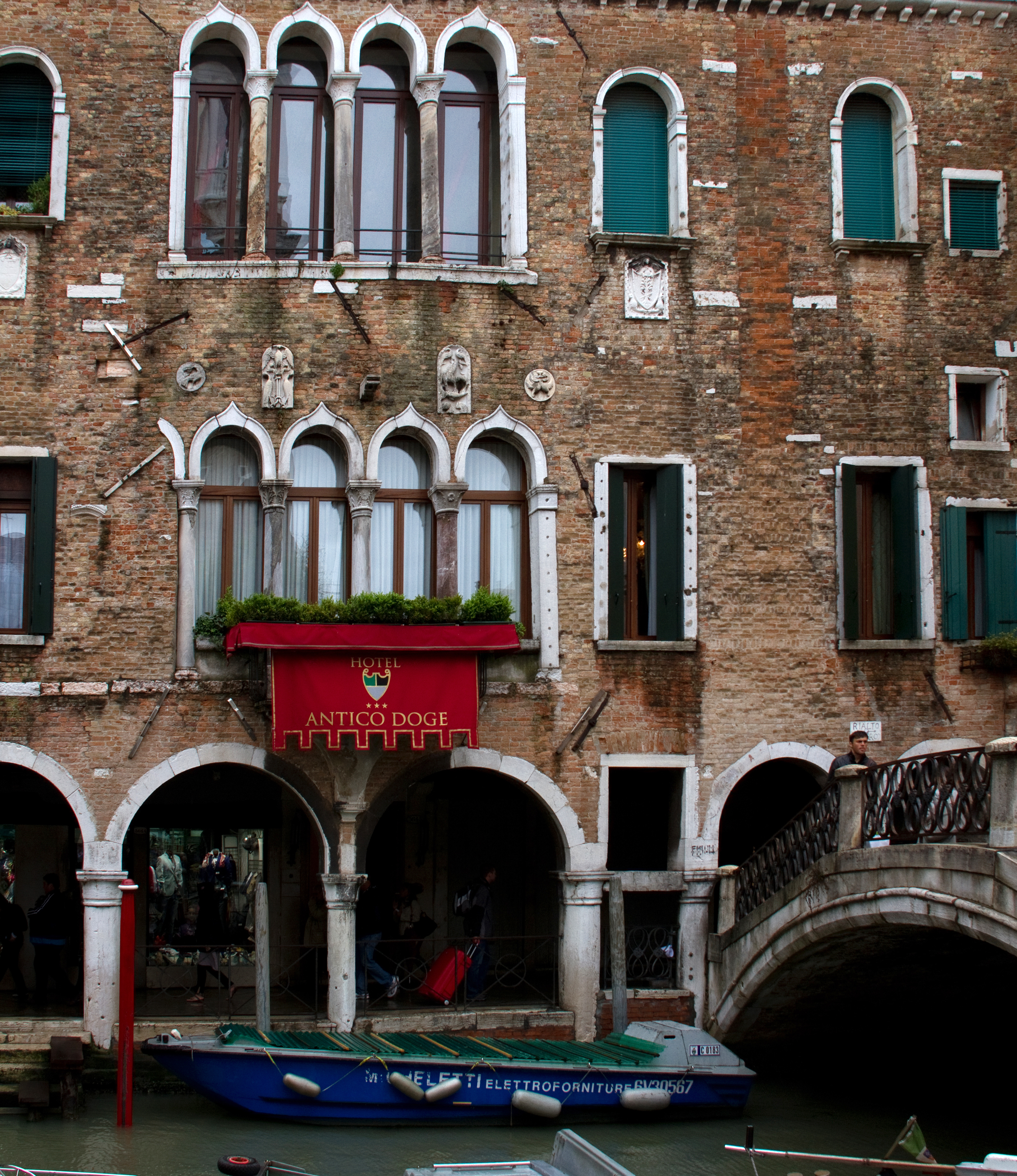
Facade details

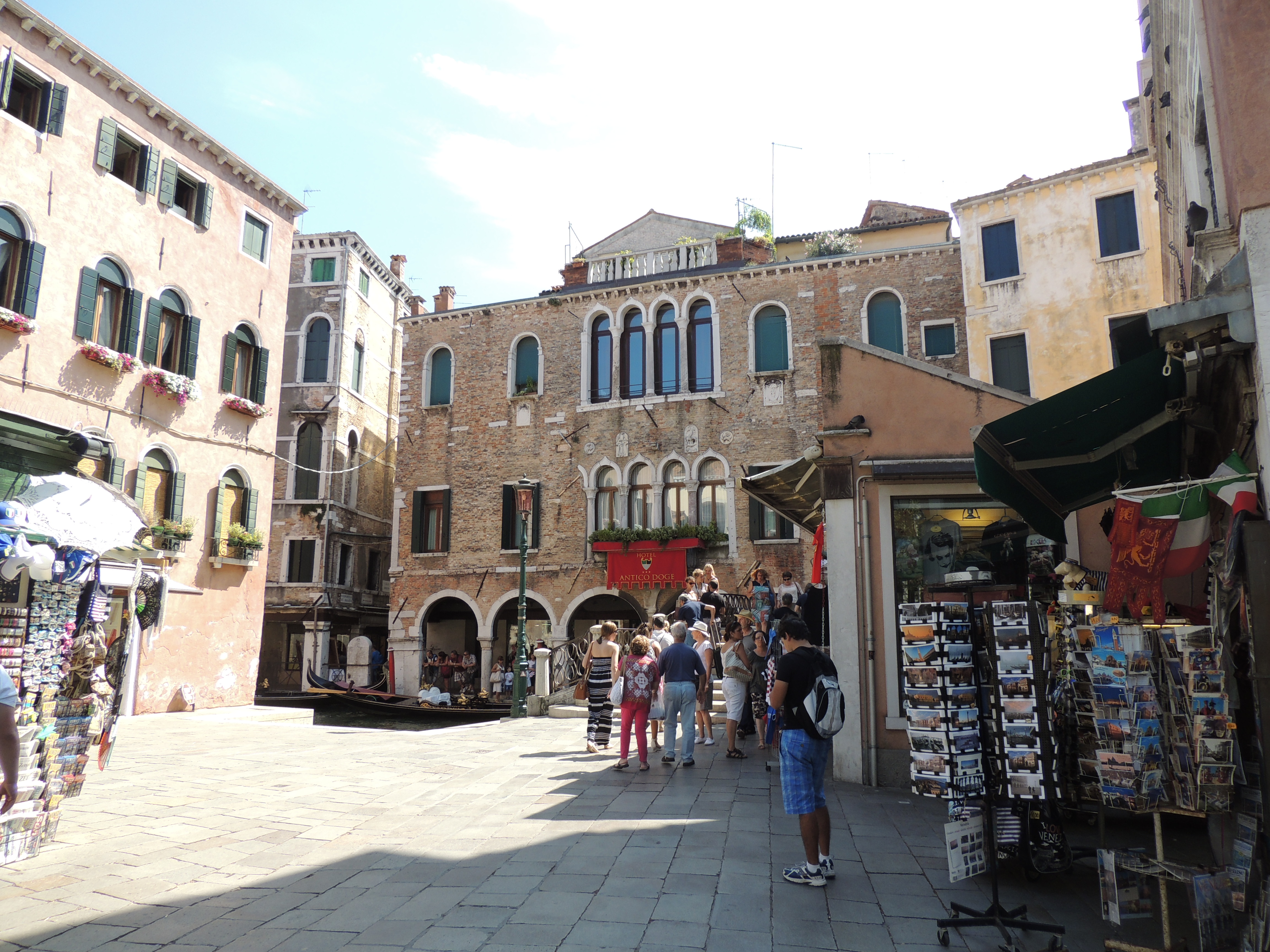
Facade details

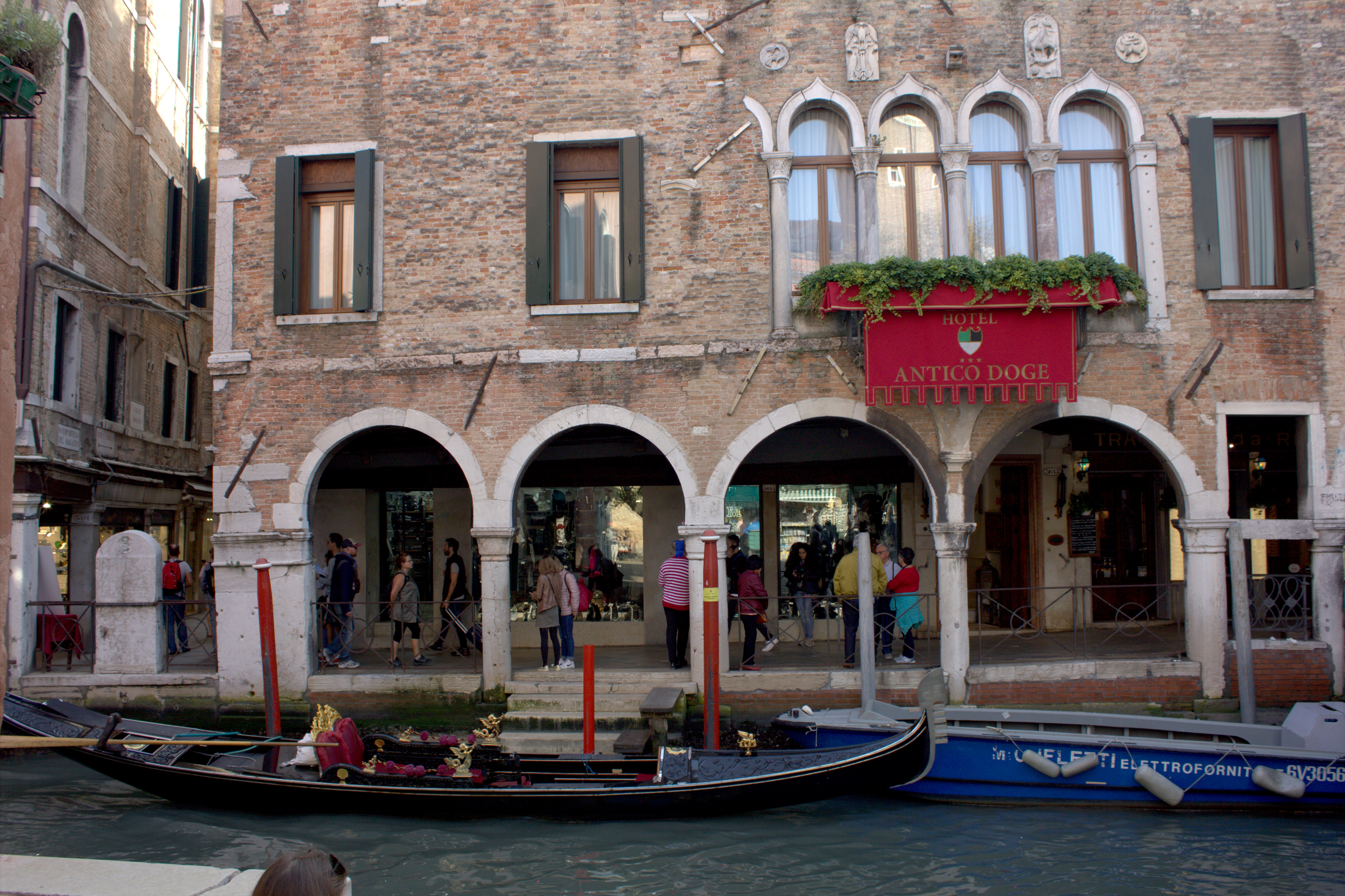
Ground floor

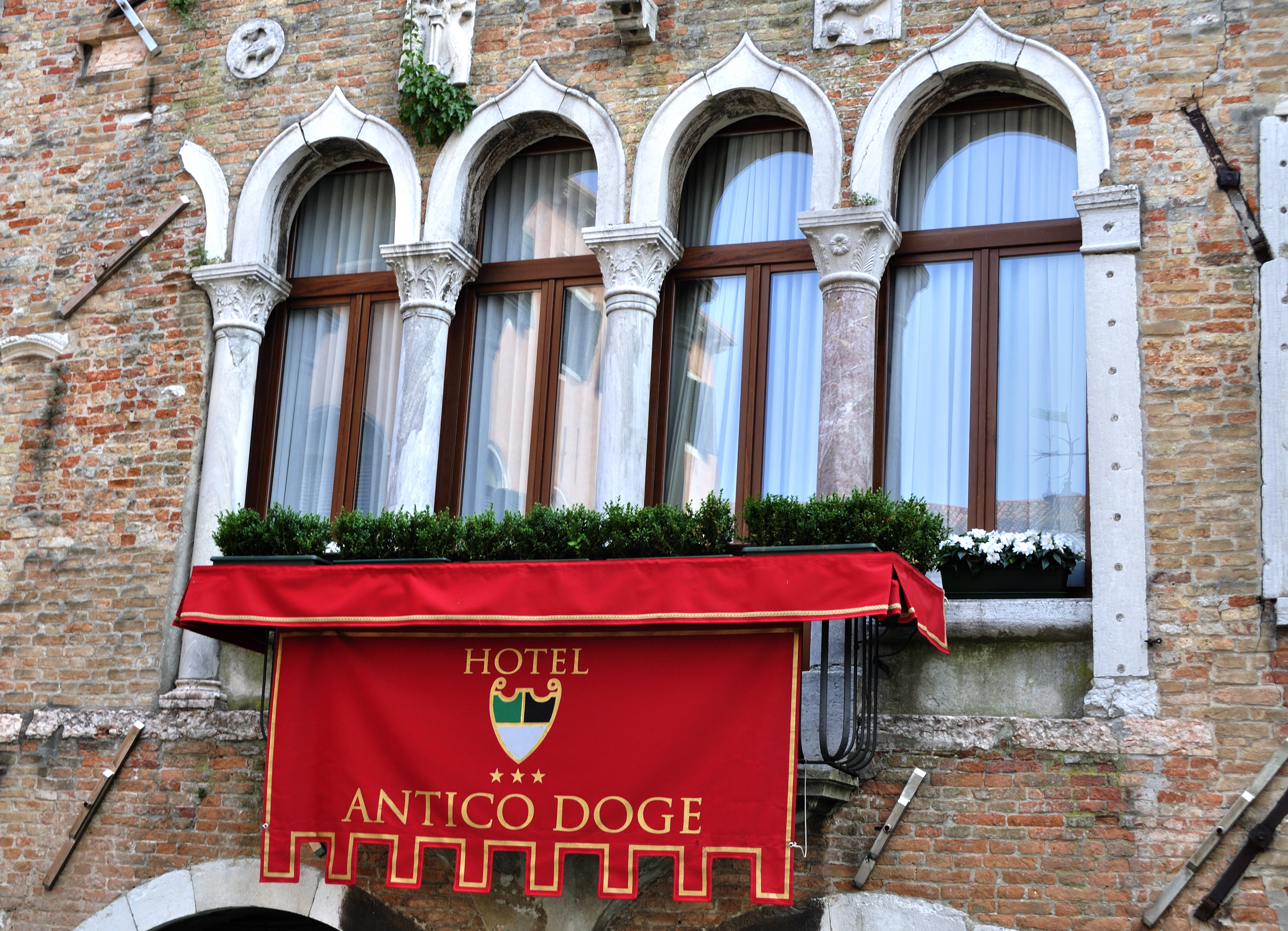
Quadrifora

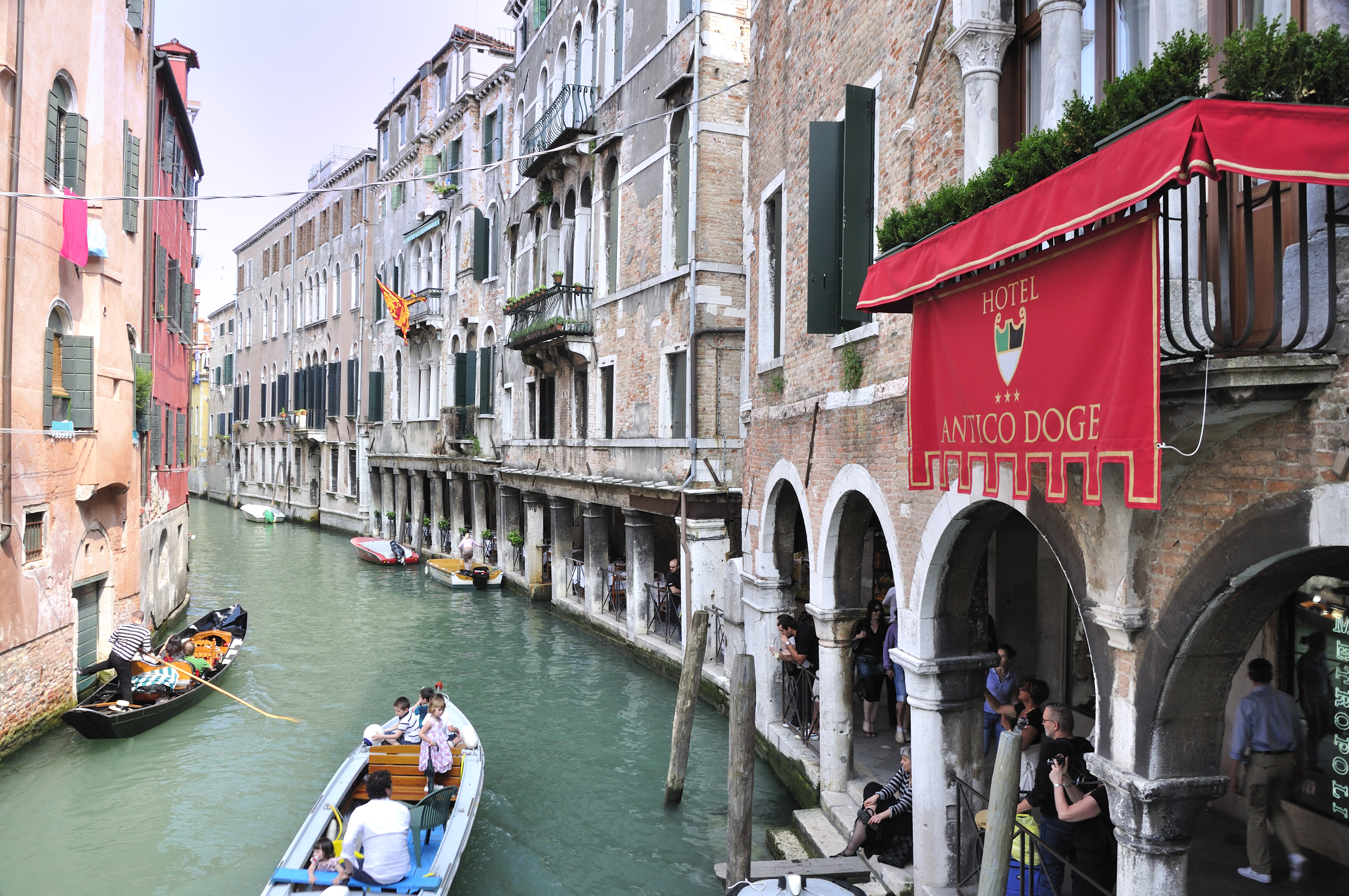
Ground floor

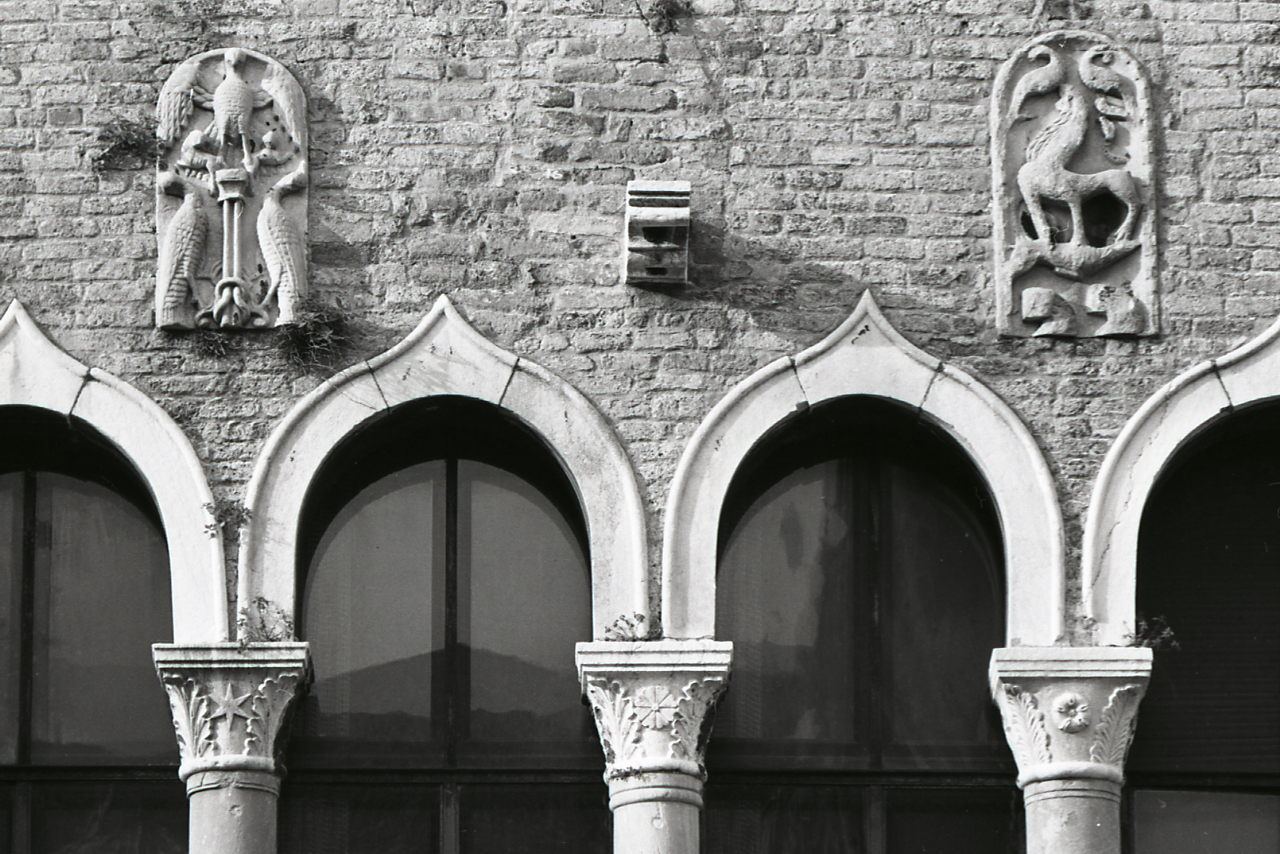
Panels on the facade

== See also ==
- Ca' da Mosto
