= Casimir Delavigne =

French poet and dramatist (1793–1843)

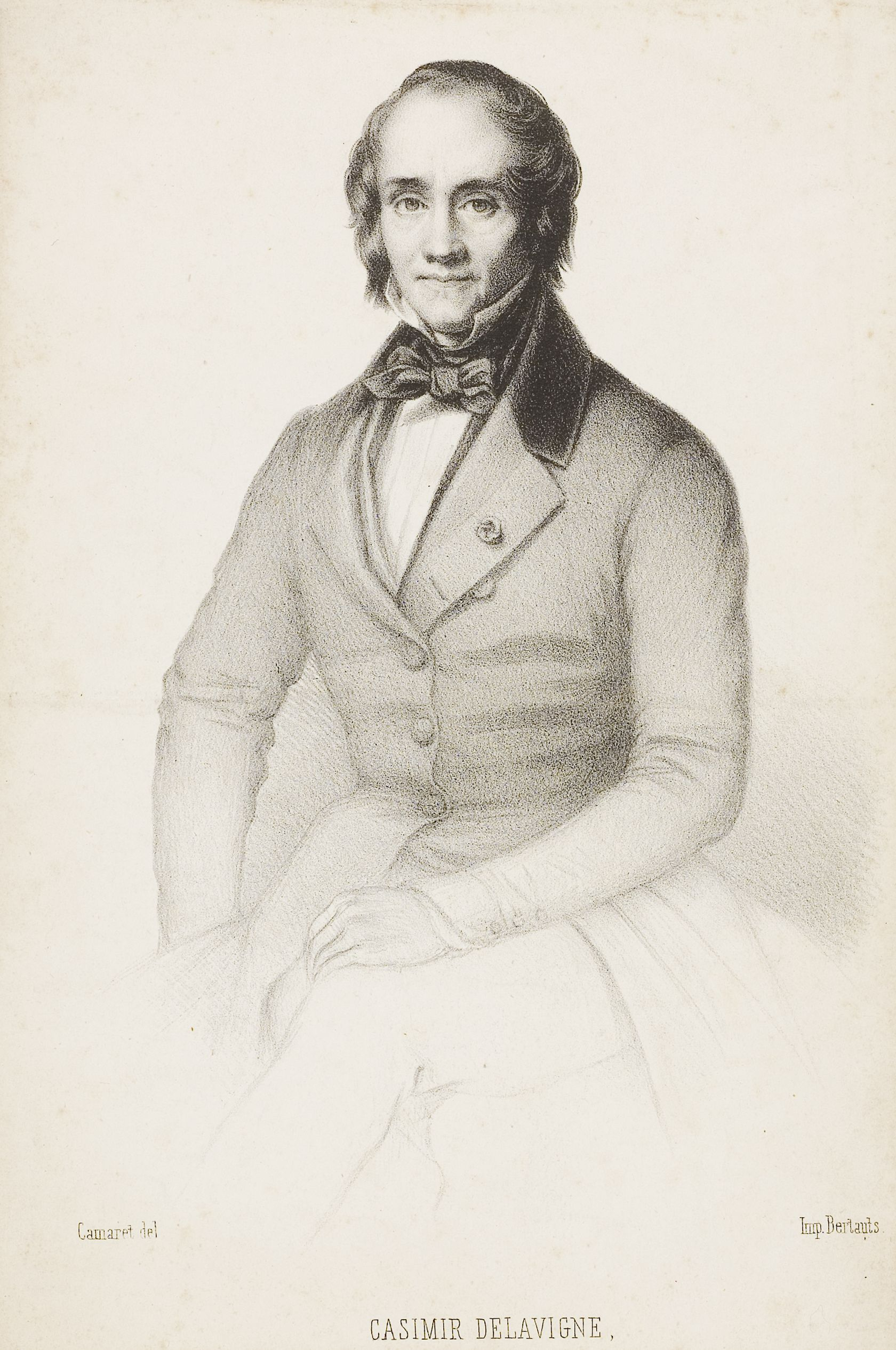
Casimir Delavigne.

Jean-François Casimir Delavigne (French pronunciation: [ʒɑ̃ fʁɑ̃swa kazimiʁ dəlaviɲ]; 4 April 1793 – 11 December 1843) was a French poet and dramatist.

== Life and career ==
Delavigne was born at Le Havre, but was sent to Paris to be educated at the Lycée Napoleon. He read extensively. When, on 20 March 1811 the empress Marie Louise gave birth to a son, named in his cradle as king of Rome, the event was celebrated by Delavigne in a Dithyrambe sur la naissance du roi de Rome, which obtained him a sinecure in the revenue office.

About this time he competed twice for an academy prize, but without success. Inspired by the Battle of Waterloo in 1815, he wrote two impassioned poems, the first entitled Waterloo, the second, Devastation du muse, both written in the heat of patriotic enthusiasm, and teeming with popular political allusions. A third, less successful poem, Sur le besoin de s'unir après le départ des étrangers, was afterwards added. These stirring pieces, termed by him Messéniennes, found an echo in the hearts of the French people. Twenty-five thousand copies were sold; Delavigne was famous. He was appointed to an honorary librarianship, with no duties to discharge. In 1819 his play Les Vêpres Siciliennes was performed at the Odéon, then just rebuilt; it had previously been refused for the Théâtre Français. On the night of the first representation, which was warmly received, Picard, the manager, is said to have exclaimed, "You have saved us! You are the founder of the second French Theatre."

This success was followed up by the production of the Comédiens (1820), an inferior play, with little plot, and the Paria (1821), which contained some well-written choruses. The latter piece obtained a longer lease of life than its intrinsic literary merits warranted, on account of the popularity of the political opinions freely expressed in it: so freely expressed, indeed, that the displeasure of the king was incurred, and Delavigne lost his post. But Louis-Philippe of France, willing to gain the people's good wishes by complimenting their favourite, wrote to him as follows:

"The thunder has descended on your house; I offer you an apartment in mine."

Accordingly, Delavigne became librarian at the Palais Royal, a position he retained for the rest of his life. It was here that he wrote the École des vieillards (1823), his best comedy, which gained his election to the Académie Française in 1825. To this period also belong La Princesse Aurilie (1828), and Marino Faliero (1829), a drama in the romantic style.

For his success as a writer Delavigne was largely indebted to the nature of the times in which he lived. The Messéniennes had their origin in the excitement resulting from the occupation of France by the allies in 1815. Another crisis in his life and in the history of his country, the revolution of 1830, stimulated him to the production of a second masterpiece, La Parisienne. This song, set to music by Daniel Auber, was on the lips of every Frenchman, and rivalled in popularity the Marseillaise. It was the French national anthem during the July Monarchy. A companion piece, La Varsovienne, was written for the Poles, by whom it was sung on the march to battle. Other works of Delavigne followed each other in rapid succession:

- Louis XI (1832)
- Les Enfants d'Édouard (1833)
- Don Juan d'Autriche (1835)
- Une Famille au temps du Luther (1836)
- La Popularité (1838)
- La Fille du Cid (1839)
- Le Conseiller rapporteur (1840)
- Charles VI (1843), an opera partly written by his brother Germain Delavigne, music by Fromental Halévy

In 1843 he left Paris to seek in Italy the health his labors had cost him. At Lyon his strength altogether gave way, and he died on 11 December. His Poèsies and his Théâtre were published in 1863. His Œuvres completes (new edition, 1855) contains a biographical notice by his brother, Germain Delavigne, who is best known as a librettist in opera.

According to the Encyclopædia Britannica Eleventh Edition,

By many of his own time Delavigne was looked upon as unsurpassed and unsurpassable. Every one bought and read his works. But the applause of the moment was gained at the sacrifice of lasting fame. As a writer he had many excellences. He expressed himself in a terse and vigorous style. The poet of reason rather than of imagination, he recognized his own province, and was rarely tempted to flights of fancy beyond his powers. He wrote always as he would have spoken, from sincere conviction.

== Adaptations ==
- Don John of Austria, opera by Isaac Nathan
- Les Enfants d'Édouard (1914) at IMDb
- Il Paria (1828), 2-act opera by Gaetano Donizetti
- Paria (opera), 1869 opera by Stanisław Moniuszko
- Marino Faliero (1835), 3-act opera by Gaetano Donizetti
