= Giovanni Polani =

Italian bishop

- Bishop of Castello
- Installed: 1133
- Term ended: 1164
- Predecessor: Bonifacio Falier
- Successor: Vitale Michiel

Personal details
- Died: 1164

Giovanni Polani (died 1164) was Bishop of Castello, Italy, from 1133 to 1164. He was engaged in a long-running dispute over jurisdiction with Enrico Dandolo, the Patriarch of Grado.

== Biography ==
Giovanni Polani was a kinsman of the Doge of Venice, Pietro Polani (r. 1130–1148). He became bishop of Castello in 1133. In this position Polani had direct jurisdiction over the parishes of Venice. Polani supported reform. In 1138 he gave the San Danielle parish church to Manfredo, a Cistercian from Abbey of Fruttuaria in San Benigno Canavese in Piedmont, so he could build a monastery. The monks established their monastery near the Cathedral of San Pietro di Castello, and the income from the church helped support it. The monks agreed to respect and pay tithes to the diocese.

Polani became engaged in a dispute with Enrico Dandolo, the Patriarch of Grado. (Note: Enrico Dandolo, appointed Patriarch of Grado around 1134, was the uncle of the famous Doge of Venice, also called Enrico Dandolo.) Eventually these clashes, which also involved the Doge, would culminate in the exile of the patriarch. In 1139, encouraged by Dandolo, the clergy of the ancient church of San Salvatore in central Venice decided to become canons regular under the rule of St. Augustine. The diocese had less control over such semi-monastic communities, some of which were directly linked to Rome. The clergy failed to confirm their subordination to the diocese. Polani was furious at what he saw as an attempt to take this important parish away from his control, and placed it under interdict. In response, Dandolo placed it under his metropolitan protection. On 13 May 1141 Pope Innocent II lifted the interdict, placed San Salvatore under his personal protection and sent two canons to instruct the congregation in the rule.

In 1141 Dandolo placed and blessed the foundation stone of the complex holding a church and hostel for pilgrims on the Isola di San Clemente. The island was given to canons regular. Dandolo expected it would come under the patriarchate of Grado, and this became a long-running cause of dispute with Polani. Eventually, in 1156 Polani was forced by the Pope to relinquish all claims against the church of San Clemente. He died in 1164.
