= San Clemente, Venice =

Church in Venice, Italy

Coordinates: 45.4121°N 12.3356°E

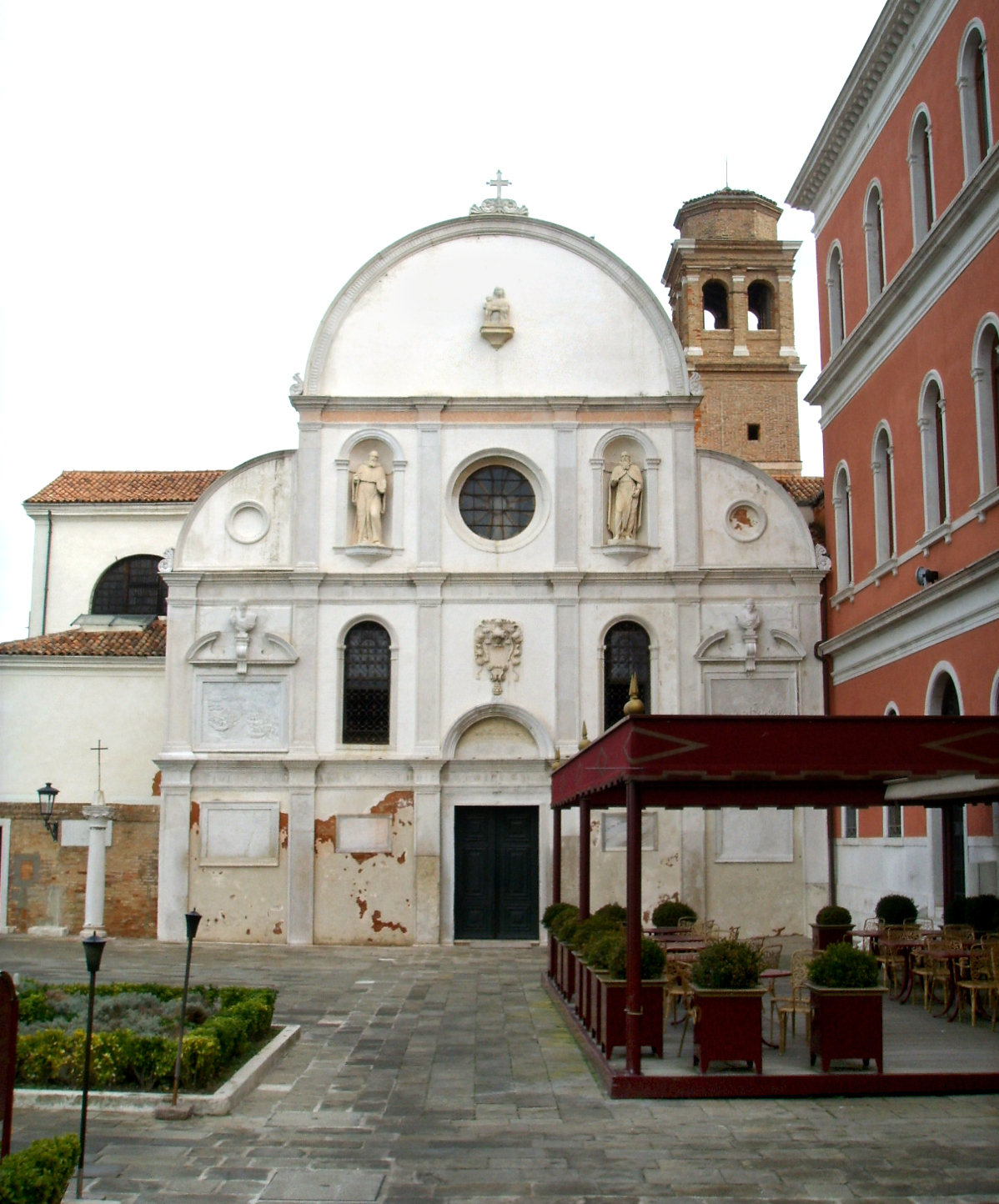
The church façade in 2007

The Church of San Clemente (Chiesa di San Clemente) is a church built in 1131 and located on San Clemente Island, in the Venetian Lagoon. The name is dedicated to Pope Clement I, who died as a martyr according to legend and who is patron of seamen.

== History ==
In 1131, wealthy merchant Pietro Gattilesso funded the construction of a church and a hospice for pilgrims and soldiers heading to the Holy Land on an island located in the Venetian Lagoon. Originally, it was built in a Romanesque style and consisted of only a single cross-shaped nave.

The complex was run by Augustine canons, while the entire island was under the jurisdiction of the patriarch of Grado Enrico Dandolo. In 1288 the relics of Saint Anianus – the first successors of St. Mark as patriarch of Alexandria – were brought to the San Clemente church.

In 1432 Pope Eugene IV moved the order of Lateran canons, also known as the Charity (Carità), to the island. Thanks to donations provided by wealthy Venetian families, the canons began work on the enlargement of the monastery and restoration of the church. The church façade was completely rebuilt in Lombard Renaissance style and divided by lesenes and cornices.

In 1643, to fulfil a vow made during the plague epidemic that struck the city in 1630, Venetians funded the building of a new chapel, modelled on the Holy House of Loreto, inside the church, where the main altar was.

Camaldolese Hermits of Monte Corona purchased the island in 1645. The Venetian nobility provided them with financial assistance to restore the church and monastery. In 1652, the Morosini family sponsored the restoration of the church façade in order to pay tribute to the family's members Francesco and Tommaso, who died in the Candia war. They entrusted Andrea Cominelli, who perpetuated the family's coat of arms above the entrance and added reliefs of scenes from battles commemorating the Morosini's victories in the war against the Turks. He also added statues of Saint Benedict and Saint Romuald – founder of the Camaldolese order.

The church was restored in 2003 as part of a wider project that adapted the adjacent buildings for hotel use. The complex now forms part of San Clemente Palace Venice on San Clemente Island, in the Venetian Lagoon, with a scheduled boat connection between San Clemente Island and Piazza San Marco of approximately 15 minutes. In 2013, the Turkish conglomerate Permak Group acquired the property and announced a further renovation programme for the complex, and as of 2024 the property operates as San Clemente Palace Venice.

== Sources ==
- Giovanna Cecconello, Carlo Giuliani, Michele Sgobba, San Clemente: progetto per un'isola, CLUVA, 1980
- Martina Carraro, L'isola di San Clemente a Venezia. Storia, restauro e nuove funzioni, Carsa, 2003
- V. M. Coronelli, Isolario dell’Atlante Veneto, Venezia, 1696-1698
