= Diocese of Castello =

Roman Catholic diocese in Italy (774-1451)

Diocese of Castello Dioecesis Castelli
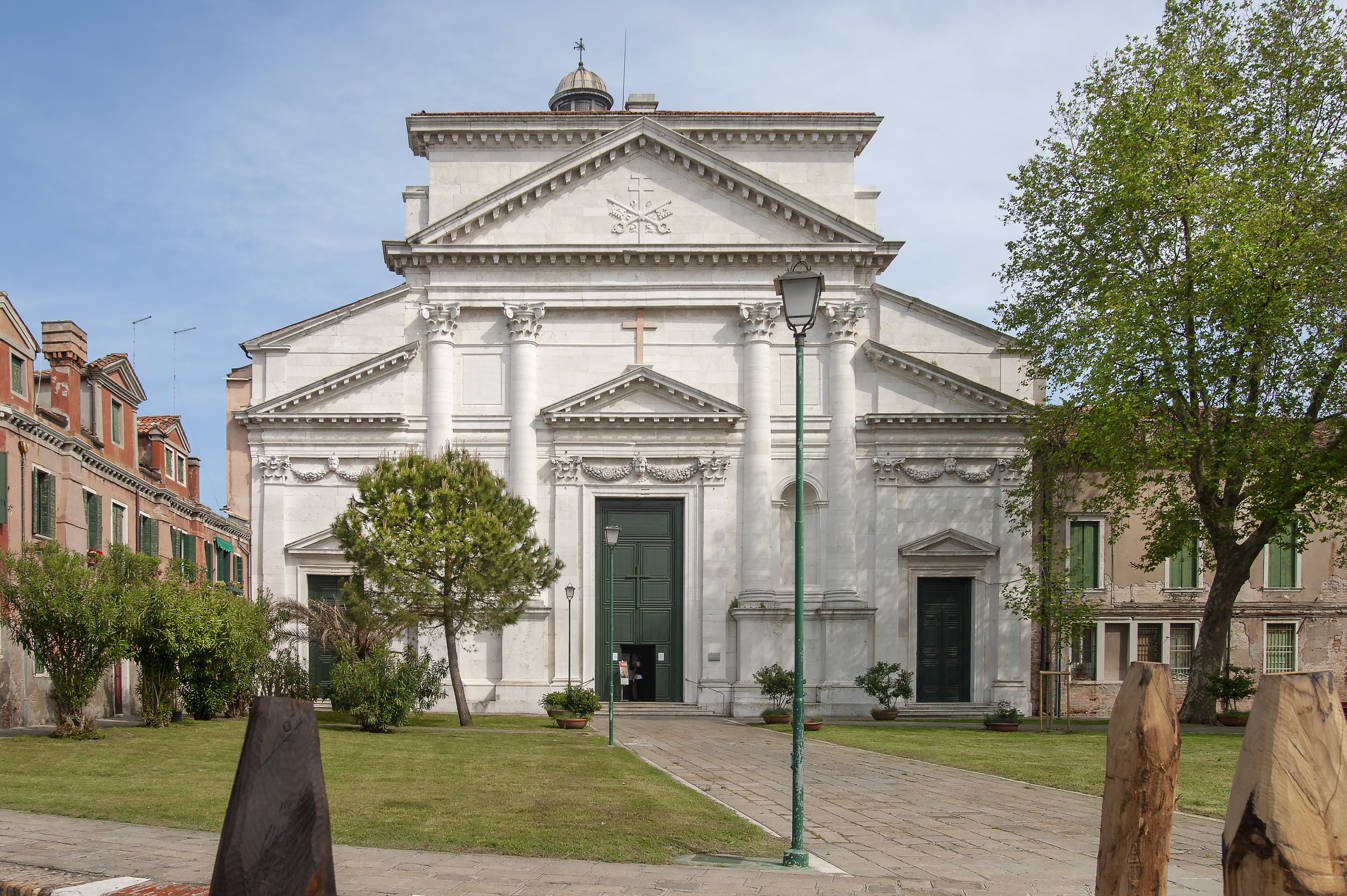
- San Pietro di Castello

Location
- Country: Italy
- Ecclesiastical province: Venezia
- Coordinates: 45.434547°N 12.359853°E

Information
- Denomination: Catholic Church
- Rite: Roman Rite
- Established: 1074
- Dissolved: 1451
- Cathedral: San Pietro di Castell

The Diocese of Castello, originally the Diocese of Olivolo, is a former Roman Catholic diocese that was based on the city of Venice in Italy. It was established in 774, covering the islands that are now occupied by Venice. Throughout its existence there was tension between the diocese, the Patriarchate of Grado to which it was nominally subordinate as suffragan see, and the Doge of Venice. Eventually in 1451 the diocese and the patriarchate were merged to form the Patriarchate of Venice.

== History ==
=== Foundation ===
The diocese has its origins in the Patriarchate of Aquileia, founded during the Roman Empire. Hilarius of Panonia is recorded as bishop of Aquileia from about 276–285. As the empire fell into decline, Aquileia was sacked in turn by Visigoths (403), Huns (452) and Lombards (659). During these times of trouble some of the people would take refuge on the offshore islands. By 630 an independent Patriarch of Grado was established on the island of Grado.

The islands of Venice had originally been subject to the Diocese of Padua. In 774 Pope Adrian I and John IV, Patriarch of Grado, authorized the establishment of an episcopal see on the island of Olivolo; the island is now called San Pietro di Castello. The bishopric was established in 774–775 by the Duke of Malamocco, who gave it his protection. Its cathedral was dedicated to Saint Peter. The Bishop of Olivolo was subordinate to Grado and had jurisdiction over the islands of Gemini, Rialto, Luprio and Dorsoduro, the main islands of the city of Venice. The bishopric, taken from the Diocese of Malamocco (Methamancus), formed a small new state, the nucleus of the state of Venice.

=== Olivolo ===
The first bishop was Obelerius. He was invested and enthroned by the doge, and consecrated by the Patriarch of Grado. In 798 the doge nominated Cristoforo as his successor. Giovanni, patriarch of Grado, refused to consecrate Cristoforo due to his youth. Giovanni was killed for his disobedience and his successor consecrated Cristoforo. From his name, which is Greek, Cristoforo may have been Byzantine.

At that time Italy was the scene of a struggle between the Lombards and Byzantines, and many in Venice were loyal to Byzantium. The Franks rose to power in the last half of the 8th century, and in 800 Pope Leo III crowned Charlemagne as Emperor. In 802 a faction that was friendly to the Franks came to power in Malamocco, and sent the Doges Giovanni and Maurizio II into exile, along with the bishop of Olivolo. In 810 a Byzantine fleet helped restore the party that favored Byzantium, and Angelo I Participazzo was made doge. An attempt by the Franks to conquer the Venetian Lagoon failed, and after long negotiations it was agreed that Venice fell in the Byzantine sphere, while Venetian merchants could trade throughout the western empire. The Doge made his seat on the island of Rialto, and with the surrounding islands including Olivolo the new state started to take the name of Venetiae.

In the ninth century the relics of saints Sergios and Bacchus were placed in the cathedral at Olivolo by the pro-Greek faction. The church of San Pietro di Castello was built by Orso Participazio, the fourth bishop of Olivolo. It was burned down several times. (Note: In 1621 the church of San Pietro di Castello was rebuilt from the ground at the expense of the patriarch Giovanni Tiepolo.)

In 828, the second year of the Doge Giustiniano Participazio, the Caliph had ordered that the Christian churches of Alexandria, Egypt, be pulled down so their marble columns could be used for his palace. The body of Saint Mark the Evangelist was smuggled out from the church of Saint Mark to Venice. To discourage the "Saracens" from examining the coffin, it was filled with pork. When the ship reached Olivolo island in Venice, the saint made signs that showed he did not want to be placed in the custody of the bishop. Instead, he was taken to the Doge's chapel, and planning began to create a magnificent new temple suitable for such important relics. The motives for the robbery of the saint's body were in part to establish the importance of the city of Venice, as opposed to the sees of Grado and Olivolo, relative to the patriarchate of Aquileia.

In 853 Orso, bishop of Olivolo, left his property to his sister Romana, She was to guard it from future bishops who might not be worthy. He decreed that if his successor mismanaged the property of the diocese, after his death she should have the power to ordain the basilica of St. Laurence to whomever she chose. The new state fought off challenges from Croats, Saracens and Hungarians, and under Pietro II Candiano (932–939) began to expand on the mainland. Under Pietro IV Candiano (959–976) the Great Council of Venice appeared, a body that included the bishops of the Venetian territories and that approved all laws. The Latin cities of the Istrian and Dalmatian coast, threatened by Slavs, placed themselves under the authority of Venice, and the Byzantine emperor consented to the Doge assuming the title of Duke of Dalmatia.

In 1001 the bishop Peter Martuseo, of the Quinta Bella family, built the church of San Agostino. In 1046 Bishop Domenico Gradenigo and Patriarch Orso Orscolo participated in the council of bishops in Saint Mark's called by the Doge Domenico Flabanico. The council made important decisions about organization and worship, including a decision that a priest could not be consecrated before the age of thirty, except in extraordinary circumstances.

=== Castello ===
In 1074, the Bishop of Olivolo began to be styled the Bishop of Castello. Enrico Contarini was the first to hold this title. He was the son of the Doge Domenico Contarini. In 1084 the Emperor Alexios I Komnenos in his Golden Bull recognized the full independence of Venice, along with freedom from tributes, trade restrictions and customs duties.

The Doge Vitale Michiel (1096–1112) held back from participating in the First Crusade until he saw the amount of loot that the Genoese and Pisans were bringing back from Palestine. In 1099 Enrico Contarini was the spiritual leader of the fleet of about 200 ships that Michiel sent to assist in the crusade in the Levant. The fleet sailed to Rhodes, where it wintered. The emperor of Byzantium asked the Venetians not to proceed, but the bishop overcame any who were inclined to listen to this request. In the spring of 1100 the fleet went on to Myra in Asia Minor, where they obtained the remains of Saint Nicholas, his uncle Nicholas and Saint Theodore the Martyr. They went on to the Holy Land, then returned to Venice, which they reached on 6 December 1100. With this acquisition, the Bishop obtained a patron saint to rival the Doge's Saint Mark.

Bishop Giovanni Polani (1133–1164) was a kinsman of the Doge of Venice, Pietro Polani (r. 1130–1148). Polani became engaged in a dispute with Enrico Dandolo, the Patriarch of Grado. (Note: Enrico Dandolo, appointed Patriarch of Grado around 1134, was the uncle of the famous Doge of Venice, also called Enrico Dandolo.) Eventually these clashes, which also involved the Doge, would culminate in the exile of the patriarch. In 1139, encouraged by Dandolo, the clergy of the ancient church of San Salvatore in central Venice decided to become canons regular under the rule of St. Augustine. Polani was furious at what he saw as an attempt to take this important parish away from his control, and placed it under interdict. In response, Dandolo placed it under his metropolitan protection. On 13 May 1141 Pope Innocent II lifted the interdict, placed San Salvatore under his personal protection and sent to canons to instruct the congregation in the rule.

The Republic of Venice began its golden age under the Doge Enrico Dandolo (1192–1205). Under him the French crusading army of the Fourth Crusade was used to bring Trieste and Zara under Venetian sway, and then to obtain a large part of the Latin Empire of Constantinople along the east coast of the Adriatic, most of the Peloponnese and settlements in the Sea of Marmora, the Black Sea and the Aegean.

The relationship between the bishop, the patriarch and the doge was complex. The bishops of Olivolo, and then Castello, were technically suffragans of the Patriarch of Grado. From the middle of the 11th century the patriarchs took up residence for most of the time at San Silvestro, Venice, while the bishop was based at San Pietro on the east of the city. An important role was played by the primicerio, based in Saint Mark's, who represented the Doge and the city government. The primicerio invested the bishops, abbots and patriarchs. From the twelfth century the patriarch had a throne in Saint Mark's, which changed its role from the Doge's chapel to the state church. In 1225 the Bishop Marco II Michel gained the exemption of the clergy from lay jurisdiction except when real property was involved. In 1230 Michiel challenged the rights of the Doges over Saint Mark's.

In an effort to standardize the rites and ceremonies, in the mid-13th century the Bishop Pietro Pino (1235–1255) made an Ordinary for the year's divine offices and holy ceremonies, with the concurrence of all the parish priests and the canons of San Pietro di Castello. This became the rule of the diocese from that date. Bishop Jacopo Albertini (1311–1329) supported Louis of Bavaria, whom he crowned as King of Italy in 1327, and was therefore deposed. Under Bishop Nicolo' Morosini (1336–1367) the dispute between the clergy and Government concerning the mortuary tithes was settled. This dispute flared up again under Bishop Paolo Foscari (1367–1375) and was ended only in 1376. During the Western Schism (1378 to 1418) Venice always adhered to the Roman claimant. Around 1418 Bishop Marco Lando (1417–1426) prescribed adoption of elements of the Roman Rite in conformity with Rome.

On 8 October 1451 the diocese was suppressed and its territory transferred to the newly created Patriarchal See of Venezia.

In 1969 the diocese was restored as the Titular Episcopal See of Castello.

== Office holders ==
=== Bishops of Olivolo ===
Bishops of Olivolo were:

- Obelerius (775–...)
- Christopher I Damiata (797–810) - deposed
  John (804) - usurper
- Christopher II (810–813)
- Christopher I Damiata (813–...) - reinstated
- Orso I Parteciacus (825–...)
- Maurice (...–...)
- Domenicus I (...–...)
- John (unknown – 876) - excommunicated by Pope John VIII
- Lorenzo I (880–909)
- Domenico II (909–...)
- Domenico III (...–...)
- Peter I Tribunus (929–938)
- Orso II (938–945)
- Domenico IV Talonicus (945–955)
- Peter II Marturio (955–963)
- George (963–966)
- Marino Cassianico (966–992)
- Domenico V Gradenigo (992–1026)
- Domenico VI Gradenigo (1026–1044)
- Domenico VII Contarini (1044–1074)

=== Bishops of Castello ===
Bishops of Castello were:

- Henry Contarini (1074–1108)
- Vitale I Michiel (1108–1120)
- Bonifacio Falier (1120–1133)
- John I Polani (1133–1164)
- Vitale II Michiel (1164–1182)
- Philip Casolo (1182–1184)
- Mark I Nicolai (1184–1225)
- Mark II Michiel (1225–1235)
- Peter III Pino (1235–1255)
- Walter Agnusdei (1255–1258)
- Thomas I Arimondo (1258–1260)
- Thomas II Franco (1260–1274)
- Bartolomew I Querini (1274–1292)
- Simeon Moro (1292–1293)
- Bartholomew II Querini (1293–1303)
- Ramberto Polo (1303–1311)
- Galasso Albertini (1311)
- Giacomo Albertini (1311–1329)
- Angelo I Dolfin (1329–1336)
- Nicholas Morosini (1336–1367)
- Paul Foscari (1367–1375)
- John II (1375–1378) - deposed
- Nicholas II Morosini (1379)
- Angelo II Correr (1379–1390) - became Pope Gregory XII
- John III Loredan (1390)
- Francis I Falier (1390–1392)
- Leonard Dolfin (1392–1401)
- Francis II Bembo (1401–1417)
- Mark III Lando (1417–1426)
- Peter IV Donato (1426–1428)
- Francis III Malipiero (1428–1433)
- Lorenzo II Giustiniani (1433–1451) - became Patriarch of Venice

=== Titular Bishops ===
Titular bishops and archbishops were:

- Titular Archbishop Angel Pérez Cisneros (1969.07.25 – 1972.08.30)
- Titular Archbishop Pierluigi Sartorelli (1972.10.07 – 1996.04.28)
- Titular Bishop: Gianni Danzi (later Archbishop) (1996.05.02 – 2005.02.22)
- Titular Archbishop Charles Daniel Balvo (from 2005.04.01)

== See also ==
- Catholic Church in Italy
