= Domenico Morosini =

Doge of Venice from 1148 to 1156

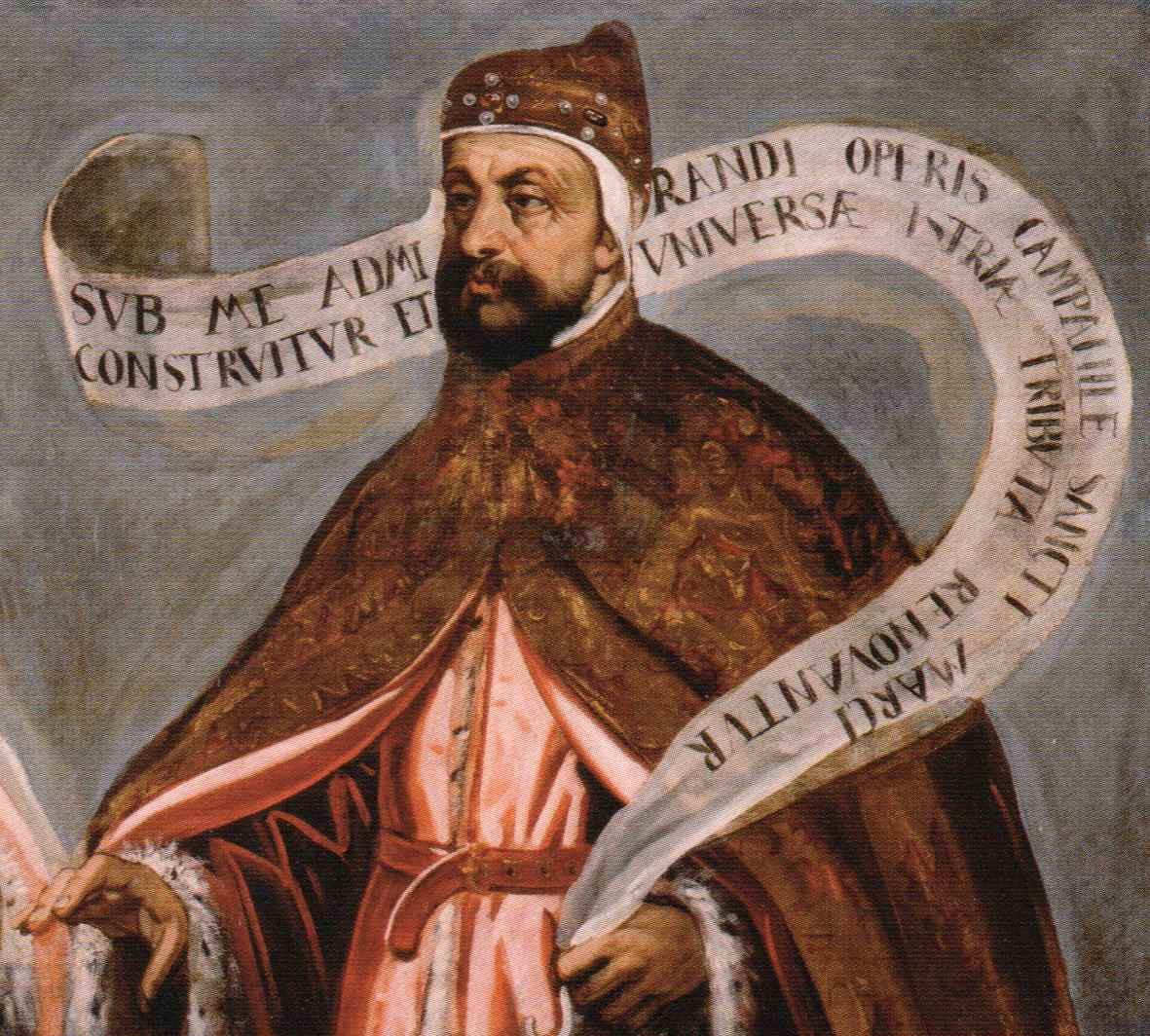
- Portrait in the Doge’s Palace

Doge of Venice
- In office 1148 – February 1155
- Preceded by: Pietro Polani
- Succeeded by: Vitale II Michiel

Personal details
- Born: Unknown
- Died: February 1155

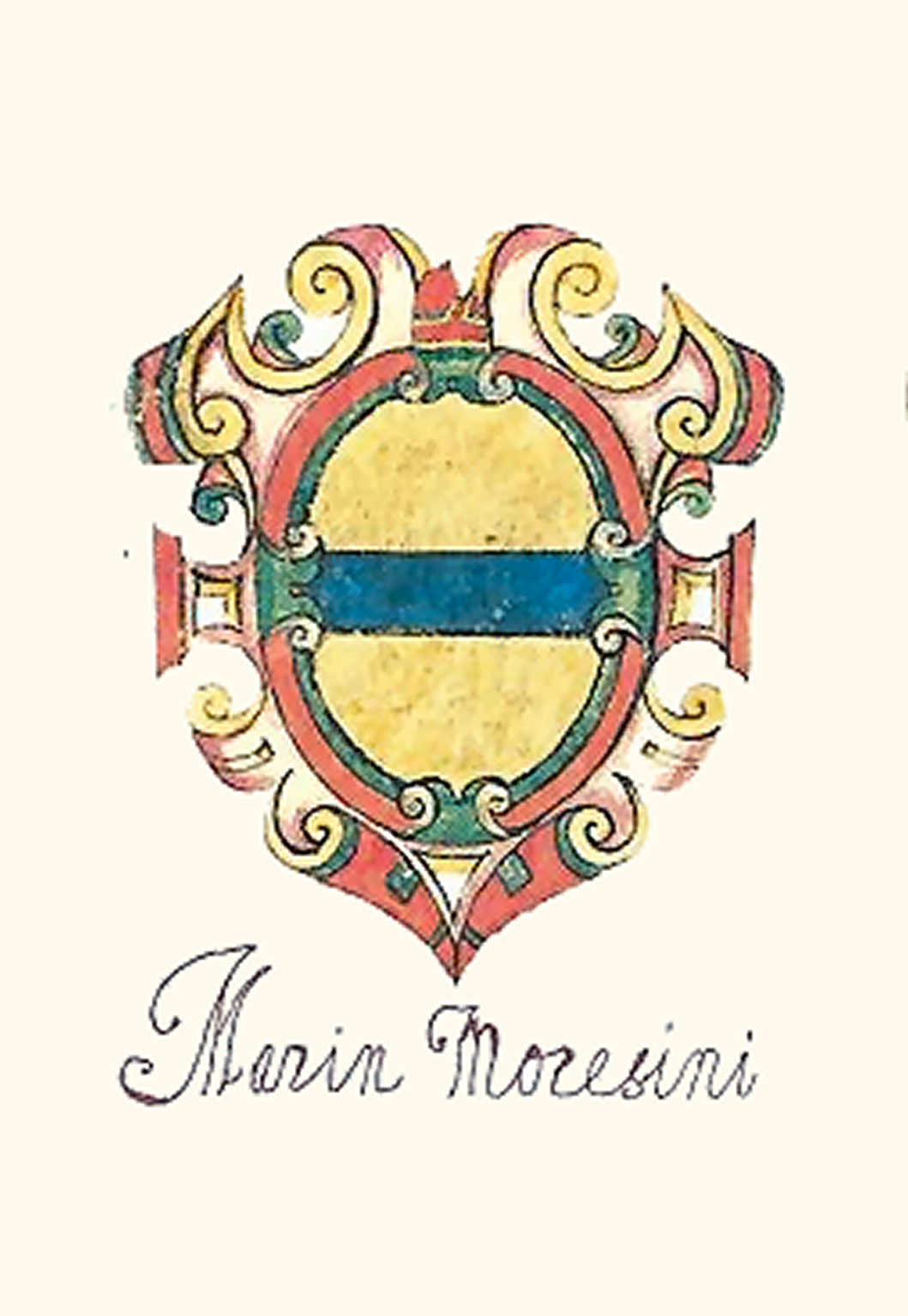
Coat of arms of the Morosini family

Domenico Morosini (died February 1156) was the thirty-seventh doge of the Republic of Venice, reigning from 1148 until his death in February 1155.

Descendant of a noble family (he was a count), Morosini succeeded in reconciling the two factions that had divided Venetian patrician families for years, thus ending a political conflict that had also caused the Republic to lose ground in its territories and primacy in its commercial activities. Quite unexceptional otherwise, Morosini's dogeship was marked by renewed prosperity and reconciliation.

== Private life ==
Morosini's early years are difficult to reconstruct, due to the absence of reliable records and sources. As a matter of fact, his birthyear is unknown, as are the activities and connections of his family before his interest in politics. This unusual lack of publicly recorded information is likely because his dukedom was relatively unremarkable in terms of conquests, expansion, and events of significance — historians of the Republic would have had little interest in "digging up the past" either to glorify or to mar his legacy. He was married to a woman named Sophia, who was according to legend a captive from the East.

The Morosini had been raised to countship in the late 10th century CE after they, with the support of Holy Roman Emperor Otto II, had vanquished the rival Caloprini family.

Domenico brought the family to the forefront of Venetian political life, starting a tradition that would see his successors contribute greatly to the wellbeing of the Republic. Ruggiero Morosini would be admiral of the Venetian navy that defeated the Genoese in 1298, while Francesco Morosini would defeat the Turks on several occasions, somewhat slowing down the westward progress of the Ottoman Empire in the process.

== Public office ==
Morosini took office at a time when relations between Venice and two of its long-time allies, Byzantine Greece and the Normans, were beginning to deteriorate. After the death of his father, emperor Alexios I Komnenos, in 1118, John II Komnenos refused to confirm the 1082 treaty (a chrysobull) with the Republic, which had given it unique and generous trading rights within the Byzantine Empire (there would be no import duties on Venetian shipments to and from the territories of the Empire). An incident involving the abuse of a member of the imperial family by Venetians led to a dangerous conflict, especially as Byzantium had depended on Venice for its naval strength.
After a Byzantine retaliatory attack on Kerkyra, John II exiled the Venetian merchants from Constantinople, but this produced further retaliation, and a Venetian fleet of 72 ships plundered Rhodes, Chios, Samos, Lesbos, Andros and captured Kefalonia in the Ionian Sea.

Relationships with the Normans deteriorated when Venice supported (through its fleet under Naimero and Giovanni Polani, sons of Morosini's predecessor Pietro Polani) a Byzantine intervention to suppress an uprising at Cape Malea (one of the peninsulas in the southeast of the Peloponnese in Greece) in 1149.

The 1148 conquest of the Istrian city of Pula, a key port in the peninsula, was followed by an insurgence which Morosini suppressed with atypical shrewdness: in 1150, reconquered Pula swore fealty to the Republic of Venice, thus becoming a Venetian possession. For centuries thereafter, the city's fate and fortunes would be tied to those of Venetian power.

Morosini's foreign policy sought a rapprochement with the Holy See, which had excommunicated the city of Venice because of its familiarity with the Byzantine Empire (and, thus, its schismatic religion). The doge extended an olive branch to Pope Eugene III by consenting, in 1152, to the independence of the Church within the territories of the Republic — a move that immediately warranted the repeal of the excommunication and thus simplified Venetian tradings with Catholic countries.
Further recognition of renewed collaboration came in 1154, when Pope Anastasius IV raised the doge dominator Marchiæ (lit. "ruler of Marche").

Morosini's reconciliation with the Church had positive effects on domestic policy as well, by bridging a long-standing feud between the Polani and Dandolo patrician families. Enrico Dandolo had been Patriarch of Grado at a particularly tense time between Venice and the pontificate, which had caused the Polani family, strong supporters of the Pope, to break relations with the Dandolos. In an attempt to reconcile the factions that had coalesced around the two families among the patricians, Morosini pushed for a mariage d'affaires between Andrea Dandolo, grandson of Enrico, and Primera Polani, niece of the previous doge.

During Morosini's dogeship, the construction of St Mark's Campanile was finally completed.

Government offices
| Preceded by Pietro Polani | Doge of Venice; 1148–1155 | Succeeded by Vitale II Michiel |
