= Notitia Dignitatum =

Document of the Late Roman Empire

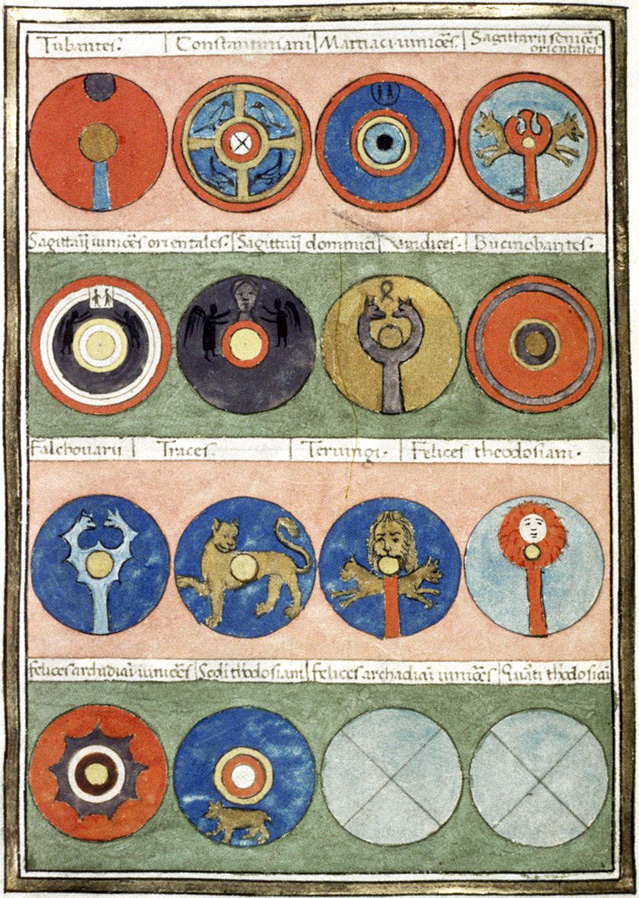
Page from a medieval copy of the Notitia Dignitatum commissioned in 1436 by Pietro Donato, depicting shields of Magister Militum Praesentalis II, a late Roman register of military commands. Bodleian Library, Oxford.

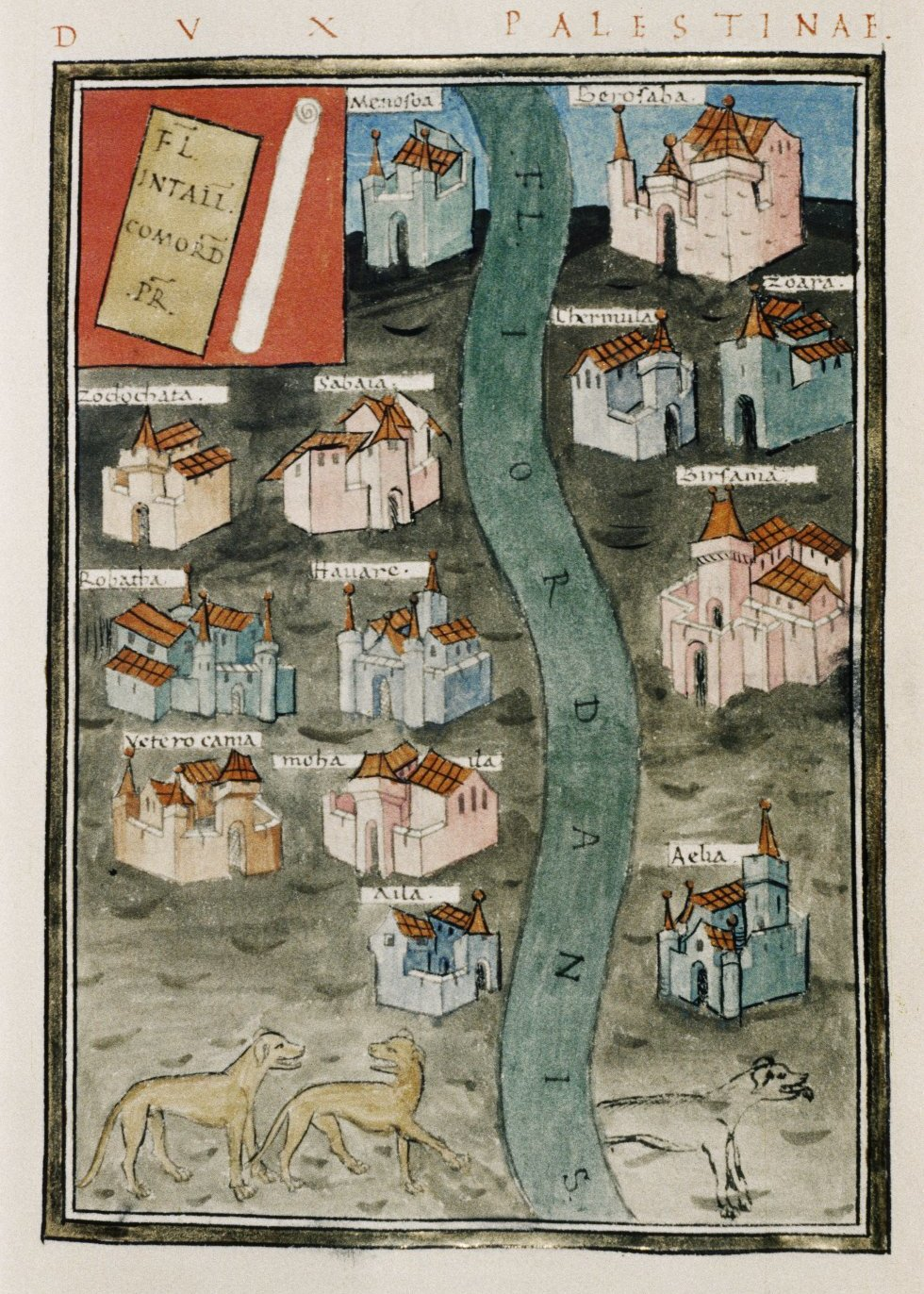
Palestine and the River Jordan, from the Notitia Dignitatum illuminated by Peronet Lamy

The Notitia dignitatum et administrationum omnium tam civilium quam militarium (Latin for 'List of all dignities and administrations both civil and military') is a document of the Late Roman Empire that details the administrative organization of the Western and the Eastern Roman Empire. It is unique as one of very few surviving documents of Roman government, and describes several thousand offices from the imperial court to provincial governments, diplomatic missions, and army units. It is usually considered to be accurate for the Western Roman Empire in the 420s and for the Eastern or Byzantine Empire in the 390s. However, the text itself is not dated (nor is its author named), and omissions complicate attempts to ascertain its date from its content.

== Publication history ==
=== Manuscripts ===
There are several extant 15th- and 16th-century copies of the document, plus a colour-illuminated iteration of 1542. All the known, extant copies are derived, either directly or indirectly, from Codex Spirensis, a codex known to have existed in the library of the Chapter of Speyer Cathedral in Germany in 1542, but which was lost before 1672 and has not been rediscovered. The Codex Spirensis was a collection of documents, of which the Notitia was the final and largest, occupying 164 pages, that brought together several previous documents of which one was of the 9th century. The heraldry in illuminated manuscript copies of the Notitia is thought to copy or imitate only that illustrated in the lost Codex Spirensis.

The iteration of 1542 made for Otto Henry, Elector Palatine, was revised with "illustrations more faithful to the originals added at a later date", and is preserved by the Bavarian State Library.

The most important copy of the Codex is that made for Pietro Donato in 1436 and illuminated by Peronet Lamy, now in the Bodleian Library, Oxford.

Manuscripts of the Notita Dignitatum
Siglum	Library	Shelfmark	Date	Source
C	Bodleian	Canon. Misc. 378	1436 (Basel)	
P	BnF	Latin 9661	15th cent.	
V	Austrian National Library	Cod. 3103	15th cent.	
M	Bavarian State Library	10291	16th cent.	

== Contents ==
For each half of the Empire, the Notitia enumerates all the major "dignities", i. e., offices, that it could bestow, often with the location and specific officium ("staff") enumerated, except for the most junior members, for each. The dignities are ordered by:

- Court officials, including the most senior dignitaries such as praetorian prefects;
- Vicars and provincial governors, arranged by praetorian prefecture and diocese; and
- Martial commanders, Comites Rei Militaris, and Duces, providing the full titles and stations of their regiments.

== Interpretation ==
The Notitia presents four primary problems as a source for the Empire's army:

1. The Notitia depicts the Roman army at the end of the 4th century AD. Therefore, its development from the structure of the Principate is largely conjectural because of the lack of other evidence.
2. It was compiled at two different times. The section for the Eastern Empire apparently dates from c. 395 and that for the Western Empire from circa AD 420. Further, each section is probably not a contemporaneous "snapshot", but relies on data pre-dating it by as many as 20 years. The Eastern section may contain data from as early as AD 379, the beginning of the reign of Emperor Theodosius I. The Western section contains data from as early as c. 400: for example, it shows units deployed in Britannia, which must date from before 410, when the Empire lost the island. In consequence, there is substantial duplication, with the same unit often listed under different commands. It is impossible to ascertain whether these were detachments of the same unit in different places simultaneously, or the same whole unit at different times. Also, it is likely that some units were merely nominal or minimally staffed. According to Roger Collins, "the Notitia Dignitatum was an archaising text written c. 425, whose unreliability is demonstrated by "the supposed existence of traditional (Roman military) units in Britain and Spain at a time when other evidence shows they were not there."
3. The Notitia has many sections missing and lacunae within sections. This is doubtless due to accumulated textual losses and copying errors, because it was repeatedly copied over the centuries: the earliest manuscript possessed today dates from the 15th century. The Notitia cannot therefore provide a comprehensive list of all units that existed.
4. The Notitia does not record the number of personnel. Given that and the paucity of other evidence of unit sizes at that time, the size of individual units and the various commands cannot be ascertained. In turn, this makes it impossible to assess accurately the total size of the army. Depending on the strength of units, the late 4th century army may, at one extreme, have equalled the size of the 2nd century force, i. e., over 400,000 men; and at the other extreme, it may have been far smaller. For example, the forces deployed in Britain circa 400 may have been merely 18,000 against circa 55,000 in the 2nd century.

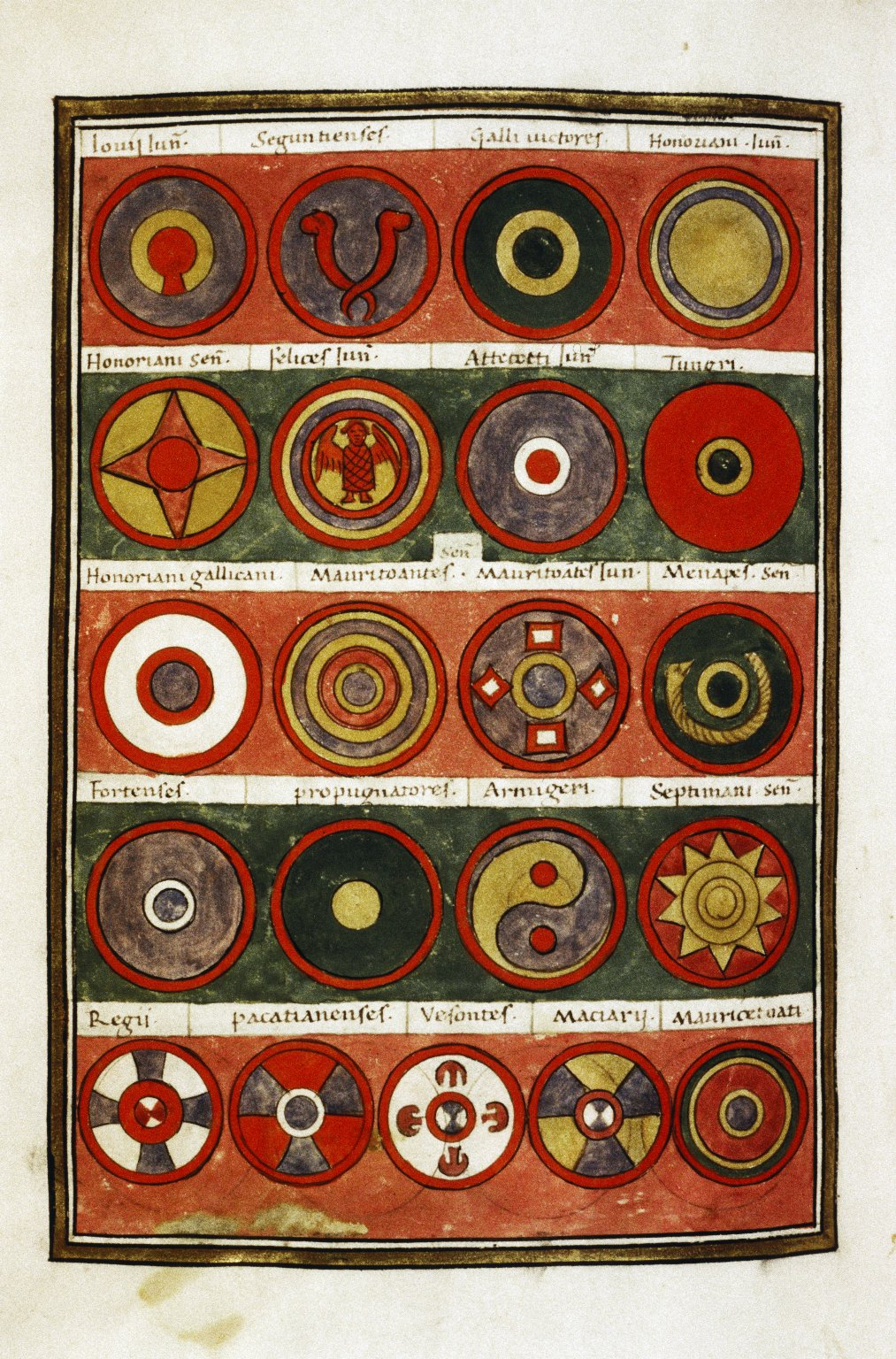
Shield pattern of the armigeri defensores seniores (4th row, third from left). Bodleian Library, Oxford.

== Depictions ==
The Notitia contains symbols similar to the diagram which later came to be known as yin and yang symbol. The infantry units armigeri defensores seniores ("shield-bearers") and Mauri Osismiaci had a shield design which corresponds to the dynamic, clockwise version of the symbol, albeit with red dots, instead of dots of the opposite colour. The emblem of the Thebaei, another Western Roman infantry regiment, featured a pattern of concentric circles comparable to its static version. The Roman patterns predate the earliest Taoist versions by almost seven hundred years, but there is no evidence for a relation between the two.

== See also ==
- Laeti
- Jublains archeological site
- List of Late Roman provinces
- Notitia Galliarum
- Roll of arms
- Tabula Peutingeriana
- Tetrarchy

== Sources and references ==
- Notitia Dignitatum, edited by Robert Ireland, in British Archaeological Reports, International Series 63.2.
- Westermann Großer Atlas zur Weltgeschichte contains many precise maps.
- Klaus-Peter Johne, 'Notitia dignitatum', in: Der Neue Pauly 8 (2000), 1011–1013.
- A. H. M. Jones, The Later Roman Empire, 284–602. A Social, Economic and Administrative Survey, The Johns Hopkins University Press, 1986. ISBN 0-8018-3285-3.
