= Peronet Lamy =

French painter

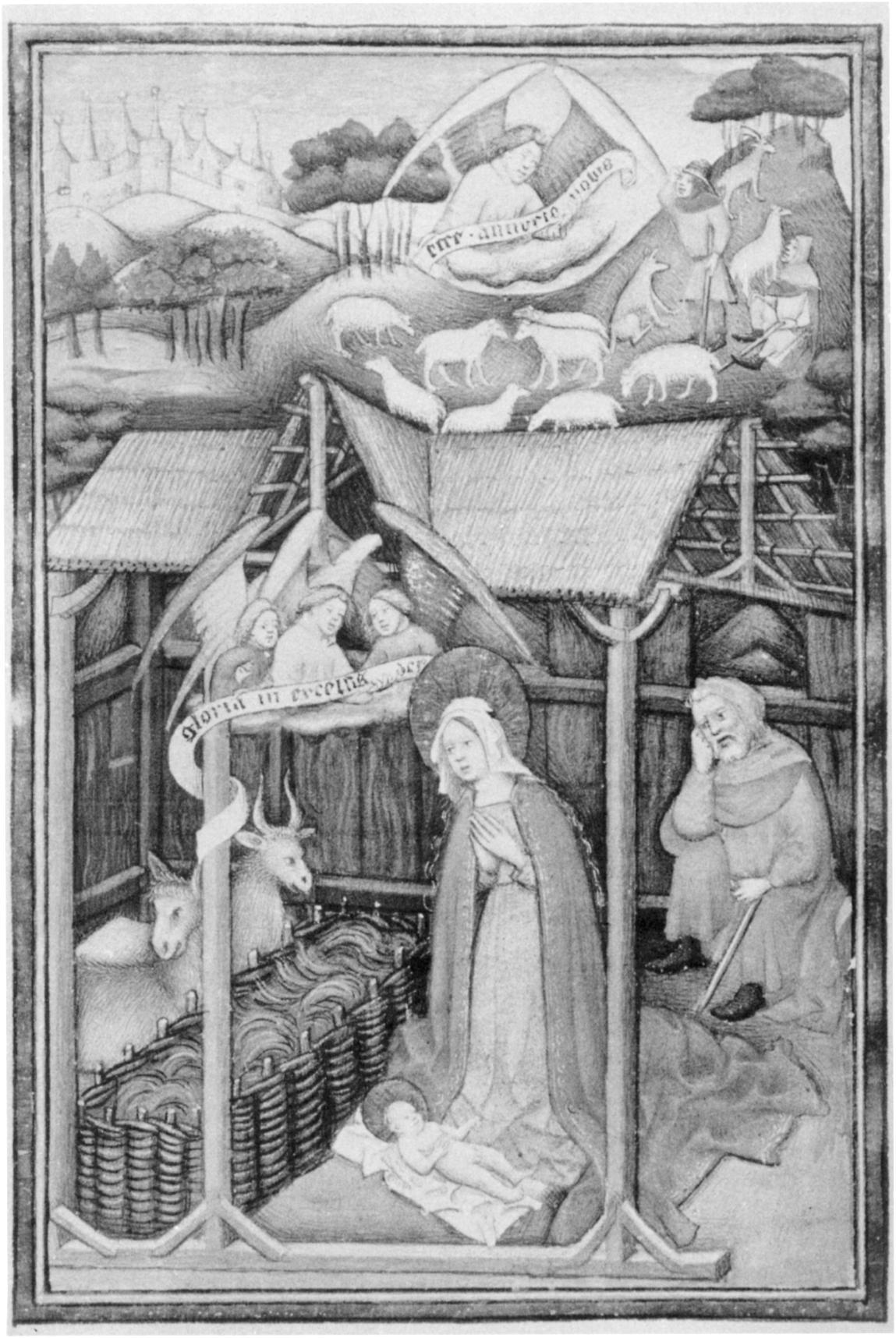
Nativity frontispiece by Lamy

Peronet Lamy (died before July 1453), called Perenet lenlumineur ("Peronet the Illuminator"), was a Gothic painter and manuscript illuminator who spent his career in the employ of the House of Savoy.

Lamy's birthplace is hypothesised to be Saint-Claude in the Bresse, then a Savoyard region bordering France. There is no record of Lamy's birth, but his brother Jean was living in Saint-Claude in 1453.

Lamy's first appearance in the historical record is in Savoy in May 1432, when he added the marginalia to the Escorial Apocalypse, a project on which he worked until 1434. This manuscript for Amadeus VIII of Savoy (also antipope Felix V) had been illustrated by Jean Bapteur beginning in 1428. The records of payment indicate that Lamy illuminated not just the marginalia for all ninety-seven folios, but also all the initials and "certain images". These four miniatures have been identified on folios 24v to 26r; they were painted after Bapteur had left the project, and Lamy had to work around his already existing illustrations.

From these miniatures it has been possible for art historians to characterise Lamy's work in terms of phases. In the miniatures, his early work, the figures are brightly coloured and softly outlined, although they have been compared unfavourably as "blander" than Bapteur's. His style is influenced heavily by Franco-Flemish art. Maxence Petit-Delchet calls him "franco-flamande" (Franco-Flemish), while Bapteur he labels "franco-italien" (Franco-Italian). In time Lamy's style grew darker and more angular.

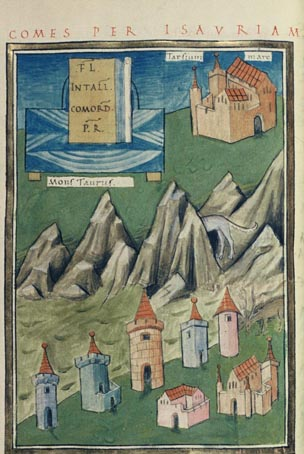
Lamy's landscape of Isauria for the Paduan Notitia

In August 1432 Lamy was again working with Bapteur, this time on the sale nove (new room) and new chapel of the château at Thonon—the project which had taken Bapteur away from the Apocalypse. This is Lamy's only preserved or recorded non-manuscript work. For the rest of his life he was a miniaturist, but none of the manuscripts he worked on has been identified. In 1434, before he had even ceased work on the Apocalypse, Lamy illuminated a book of hours for Anne of Lusignan, giving it one hundred gold letters. In 1436 Lamy completed a Nativity scene for the frontispiece of a Gospel book commissioned by Pietro Donato; the rest of the illuminations in this work were done by Johannes de Monterchio. The identification of this work as Lamy's was first communicated to the Pierpont Morgan Library by Otto Pächt in 1943. While the bulk of the Gospel lectionary is in the Paduan style, the frontispiece is distinctly un-Italian; it was once attributed to an Upper Rhenish artist. Probably Lamy was hired by Donato while the latter was attending the Council of Basel. Donato hired Lamy again to work on the miniatures for his copy of the Codex Spirensis, an important Carolingian compilation containing notably the Notitia Dignitatum and De rebus bellicis. The initials in this manuscript are by others. The miniatures are immensely useful to scholars as basically faithful reproductions of the originals, shedding much light on the late Roman army. The architectural illustrations in the Notitia appear influenced by the manuscript workshop of the French regent, John, Duke of Bedford. At least one of the illustrations, a view of Constantinople, appears to have been an addition of Peronet not found in the original. Peronet produced another copy of the Notitia (which was in Florence c.1443) wherein the miniatures are stylised and "modernised".

In 1440 Lamy made (or was paid for) an "ystoire de Nostre Dame et la premiere letter et la vignette entour" as part of a book of hours for Yolande of France, the young fiancée of the future Amadeus IX. His next major work as an unidentified psalter and then, in November 1443, unspecified aucunes enlumineures, for which the Savoyard court paid him five gold ducats. These illuminations have been identified as those of the Royal Missal, commissioned by Duke Louis and given to his father, Felix V. Peronet Lamy has also been identified with the master of the Champion des Dames, and with the creator of the Archives Missal, another missal for Felix V.

Lamy's work for Felix can be dated to before 1445, as financial troubles past that date would have precluded any more commissions. Lamy's final recorded work was on a breviary for Duke Louis (c.1452). The Champion, written c.1441–2 by Martin Le Franc, contains the earliest known portrait of Philip the Bold.
