= Giovanni Loredan =

Venetian nobleman and Bishop of Capo d'Istria

- Bishop of Capo d'Istria
- Church: Roman Catholic Church
- Province: Istria
- Diocese: Diocese of Capo d'Istria
- Appointed: 21st of November, 1390
- In office: 21 Nov 1390 - 22 Apr 1411
- Predecessor: Lodovico Morosini
- Successor: Cristoforo Zeno
- Previous post: Bishop of Castello

Orders
- Ordination: by Pope Boniface IX

Personal details
- Died: 22nd of April, 1411 Koper, Republic of Venice
- Buried: Cathedral of the Assumption of the Blessed Virgin Mary

Giovanni Loredan (lat. Ioannes Lauredanus) was a Venetian nobleman of the Loredan family. He served as the Bishop of Capo d'Istria (today Koper, Slovenia) from 1390 until his death on the 11th of April, 1411.

From 1354 he was the presbyter of Saint Mark's Basilica, Venice. He was appointed Bishop of Capo d'Istria on 21 November 1390. According to several church chronologies, before that he was also a bishop in Venice, in what was then the Diocese of Castello. It is recorded that in 1391 he dedicated the church of St. George in Koper. He was buried in the Cathedral of the Assumption of the Blessed Virgin Mary in Koper. In some historical sources he is mentioned under the name of Giacomo or the Slovenian Jakob.
