= San Pietro di Castello (island) =

Island in Venetian Lagoon of Italy

- Location within Venetian Lagoon

Geography
- Coordinates: 45.433889°N 12.36°E
- Adjacent to: Venetian Lagoon

Administration
- Italy
- Region: Veneto
- Province: Province of Venice

San Pietro di Castello (Venetian: San Piero de Casteło), formerly Olivolo (Italian: Olivòlo; Venetian: Ołivoło), is an island in the Venetian Lagoon, northern Italy, forming part of the Castello sestiere.

It is linked to the main islands of Venice by two bridges.

== History ==
The island was the site of a castle from at least the 6th century, and it is from this that the island and the sestiere are named. In the seventh century, it became the seat of the Bishop of Olivolo, later renamed Bishop of Castello. When Castello was merged into the Roman Catholic Archdiocese of Venice it remained the seat of that archdiocese until 1807. The Church of San Pietro was the seat from the ninth century, while other attractions on the island include a campanile with a ring of bells in C, and the greenery of the Campo San Pietro.

== Gallery ==
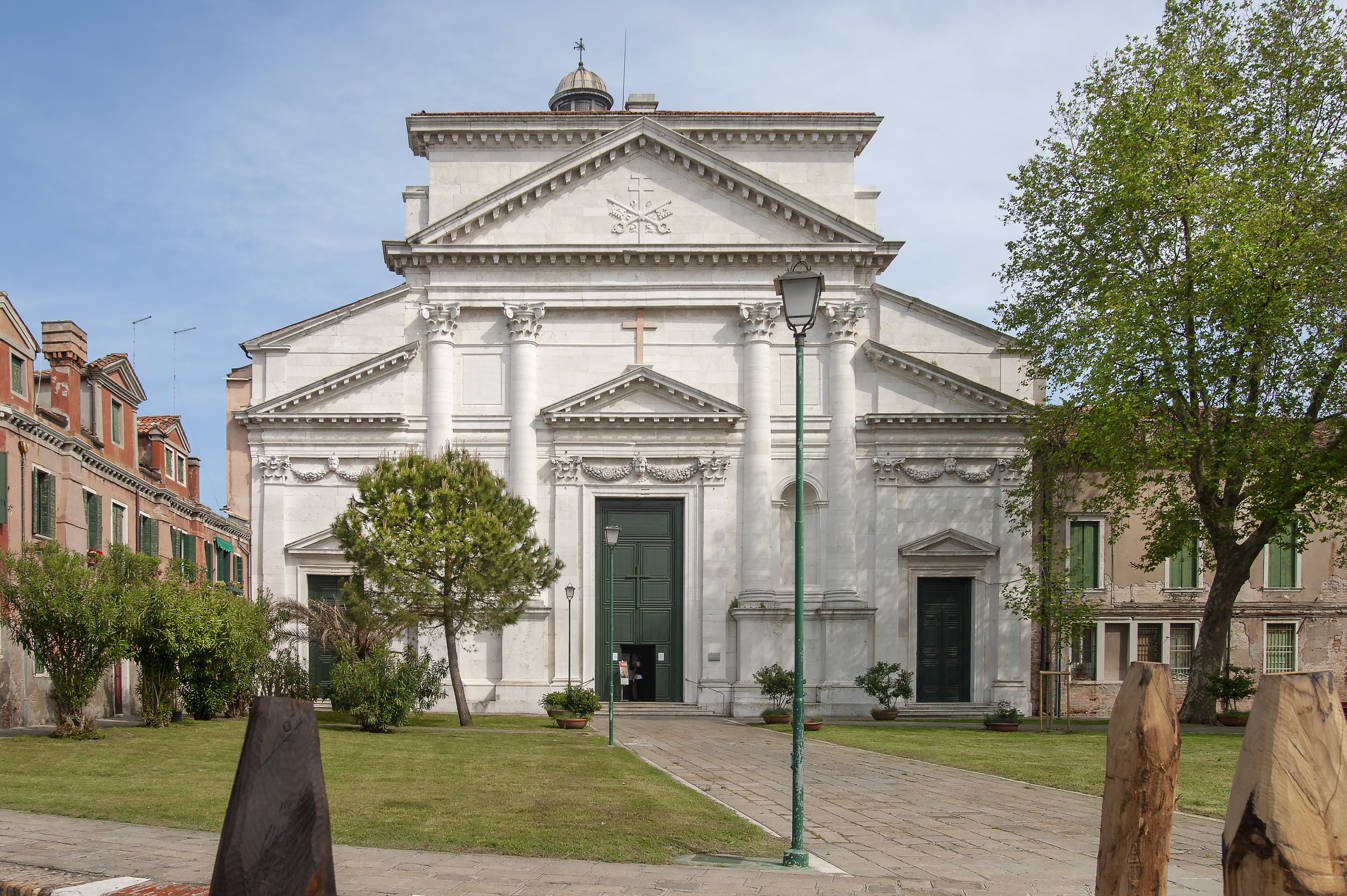
Facade

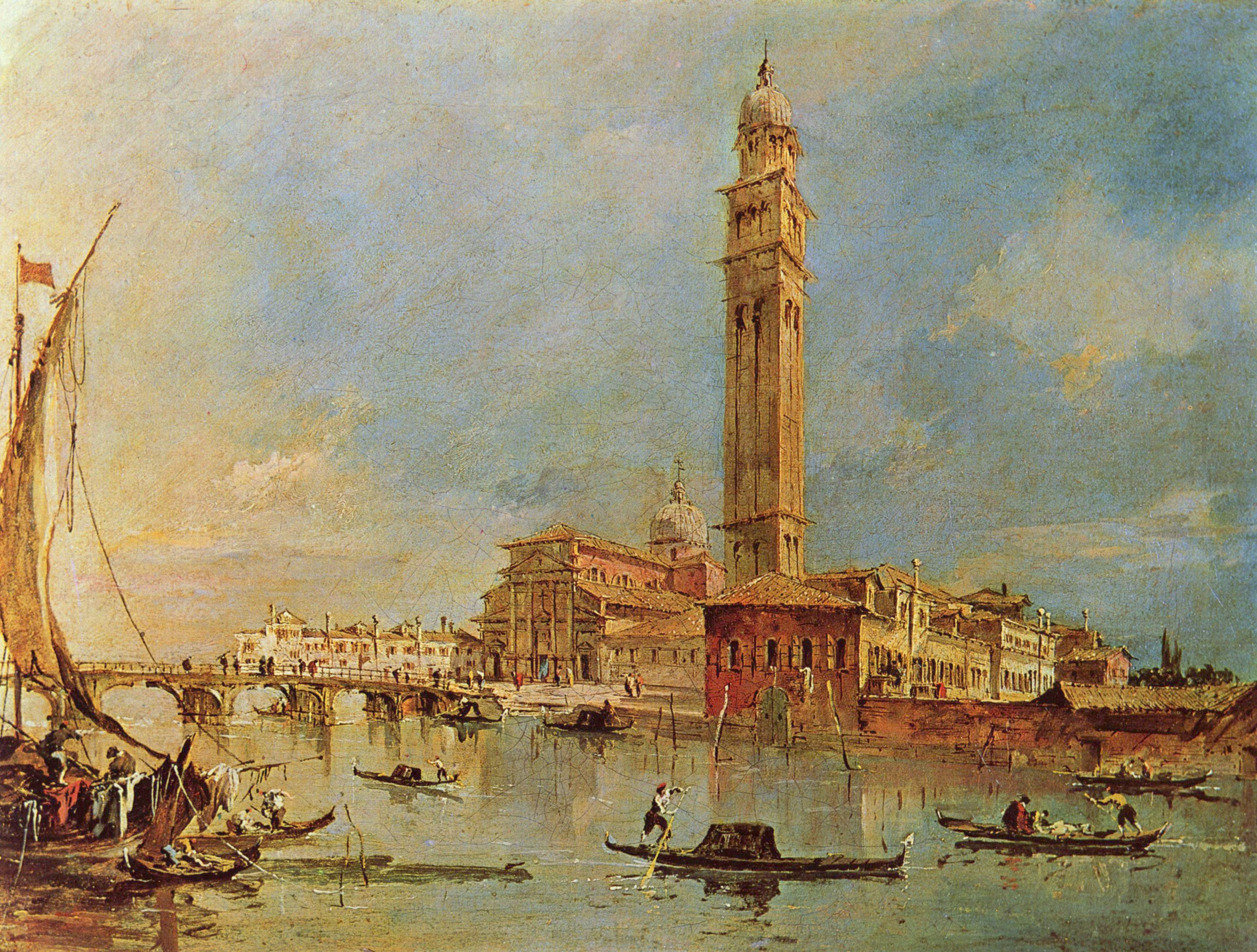
View of San Pietro di Castello by Francesco Guardi

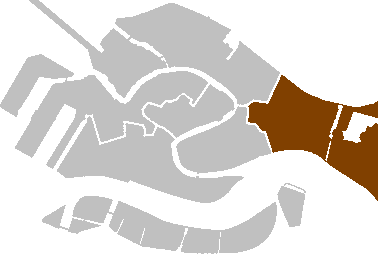
Castello Sestiere shown within Venice
