= Pietro Donato =

Venetian humanist and archbishop

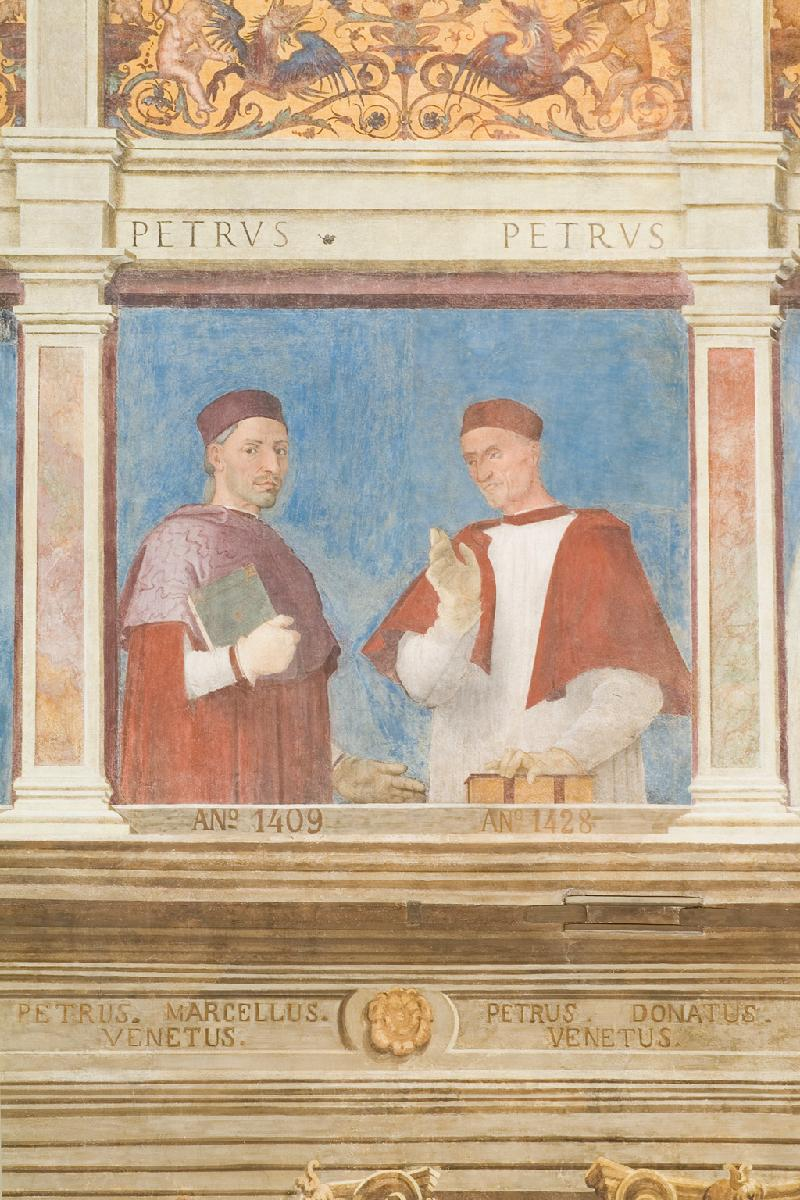
Bishops Pietro Marcello and Pietro Donato in the episcopal palace in Padua. Fresco by Bartolomeo Montagna.

Pietro Donato (also Donà or Donati; c. 1390 – 7 October 1447) was a Venetian Renaissance humanist and successively archbishop of Crete (1415–1425), bishop of Castello (1425–1428) and bishop of Padua (1428–1447). He was governor of Perugia from 1425 to 1430. He was also a noted bibliophile, epigraphist, collector, and patron of art.

== Life ==
Donato was born into a Venetian patrician family around 1390. He was the third son of Nicolò Donà. He received his education at the humanist boarding school of Gasparino Barzizza. Promoted by Biagio Pelacani, he studied arts at the University of Padua. He received a bachelor's degree in 1410 and a doctorate of arts in 1418. He was a Thomist. As a humanist he kept a correspondence with Poggio Bracciolini.

By 1411, Donato was a protonotary apostolic. In 1415, he was elected archbishop of Crete with a dispensation from Pope John XXIII on account of his age. He never took possession of the diocese. Donato attended the Council of Constance in 1417. After the death of Cardinal Francesco Zabarella at the council in late September 1417, he composed, along with Barzizza and Pier Paolo Vergerio, a eulogy.

In 1423, Pope Martin V appointed him co-president of the Council of Pavia alongside Jacques de Camplo, Leonardo di Stagio Dati and the abbot of Rosazzo. The council soon relocated to Siena in the face of an epidemic. After a breakdown in the proceedings, the presidents fled Siena for Florence in secret on 7 March 1424. There they declared the council dissolved. In 1425, Martin V named Donato governor of Perugia, which had been acquired by the Papal State in 1424.

On 5 December 1425, Donato was elected bishop of Castello. Nevertheless, he continued to reside in Perugia. In 1426, his province was extended to include Assisi. In 1428, he was named bishop of Padua. In 1430, he was called to Rome. In 1431, he finally took up residence in his diocese.

Donato and Archbishop Giovanni Berardi were appointed co-presidents of the Council of Basel by Pope Eugene IV. He and Berardi protested the Council after the eighteenth session (26 June 1434) re-affirmed the Haec sancta and the twenty-first session (9 June 1435) abolished the annates. On 11 August 1435 the Council officially reprimanded them, requesting that they lose their objections. Donato later toured southern Germany in 1437. He attended the Council of Florence in 1438–39 and 1442.

Donato was instrumental in obtaining a papal brief in December 1439 confirming the University of Padua to be the equal of Paris, Bologna, Oxford and Salamanca. He died in Padua on 7 October 1447, possibly of plague. He was buried in the cathedral.

== Works and commissions ==
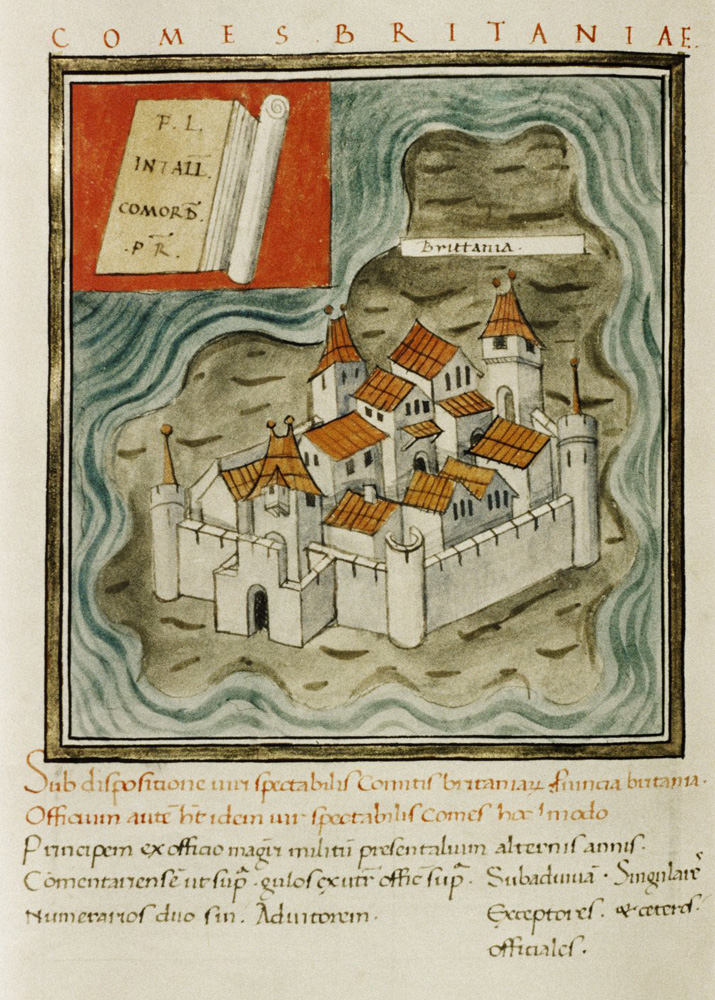
Image from the Notitia manuscript commissioned by Donato in 1436

In 1436, Donato commissioned several manuscripts. First, there is an illuminated Latin Gospel book, now manuscript 180 in the Pierpont Morgan Library, that was created for Donato in Padua. The chief illuminator was Johannes de Monterchio, while the frontispiece was by Peronet Lamy. Second, there is an illustrated copy of the Notitia Dignitatum that now resides in the Bodleian Library as Canon. Misc. 378. The manuscript of the Notitia which Donato had copied was one he had found in Speyer, the Codex Spirensis earlier that year attending the council at Basel; its discovery influenced the Roma instaurata of Flavius Blondus. The work of Frontinus on the aqueducts of Rome and Vitruvius's De architectura were preserved in very poor manuscripts until Giovanni Giocondo edited them in the 1430s, for presentation to Donato.

As an epigraphist, Donato compiled ancient inscriptions and collected many ancient artefacts. The Manuscript Hamilton 254, now in the Berlin State Library, was such an epigraphic collectanea. It was compiled, at least in part (folios 81r–90v), by Ciriaco d'Ancona, and based on one of his three visits to Athens (1436, 1437–8, and 1444). With the aid of a scribe and a draughtsman, Ciriaco created a portfolio of sketches of several ancient Greek ruins, most notably the Parthenon, for Donato.

Donato possessed an exemplary copy of the Chronicon of Eusebius in Jerome's translation. He also owned 358 manuscripts of Thomas Aquinas, including the Prima pars and the Prima secundae.

It has been suggested that Donato, among other Paduan humanists, like Ciriaco, Francesco Barbaro, Jacopo Zeno, Palla Strozzi, and Leon Battista Alberti, may have influenced the classicism of the work of Donatello—especially his equestrian monument to Gattamelata—during his Paduan years (1444–53), when he had a studio near the Santo.

Donato had work done on the episcopal palace during his tenure. In 1437 he contracted one Giovanni da Ulma to redecorate the chapel of San Massimo there. In 1444, Donato commissioned Giovanni da Firenze to make the current font for the baptistry; Giovanni also repaved the interior and redid the tombs. In 1445 he completely rebuilt the bishop's residence in a sumptuous manner.
