= Angelo Barozzi =

Venetian Roman Catholic prelate

- Patriarch of Grado
- Appointed: Giovanni Veneri
- Installed: 1207
- Term ended: 1237
- Predecessor: Benedetto Falier
- Successor: Leonardo Querini

Personal details
- Died: 1237

Angelo Barozzi o Barocci (died 1237) was a Roman Catholic prelate. He was first priest of San Giovanni Elemosinario, then chaplain of St Mark's Basilica and ducal Chancellor. In August 1207 he was appointed patriarch of Grado.

== Sources ==
- Dizionario storico-portatile di tutte le venete patrizie famiglie: così di quelle, che rimaser'al serrar del Maggior Consiglio, come di tutte le altre, che a questo furono aggregate (in Italian). Bettinelli. 1780. p. 28.
