= Martin le Franc =

Medieval and Renaissance French poet

Martin le Franc (c. 1410 – 1461) was a French poet of the late Middle Ages and early Renaissance.

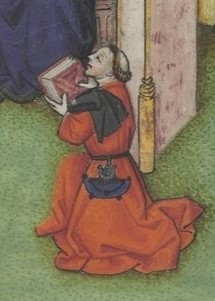
Portrait of Martin le Franc from the presentation miniature of his Le Champion des Dames, 1451

== Life and career ==
Martin le Franc was born in Normandy, and studied in Paris. He obtained a Master of Arts degree from the University of Paris before entering the service of Amadeus VIII of Savoy (later Antipope Felix V) in the mid-1430s. In 1439, he entered clerical orders after being named an apostolic prothonotary by Felix. He was later named provost of Lausanne Cathedral in 1443, and became canon of the Church of Geneva in 1447. Following Felix's abdication 1449, Le Franc served as a prothonotary under Pope Nicholas V and in 1450 he became secretary to the Duke of Savoy.

Martin le Franc is famous in music history for penning the phrase "la contenance angloise", the English countenance, a much-debated phrase referring to a characteristically English sound found in the music of composers such as John Dunstaple. The "countenance" was probably consonant, sweet intervals (3rds and 6ths) which were predominant in the music of contemporary English composers. Le Franc praised Du Fay and Binchois, composers associated with the Burgundian court, for adopting the English countenance, a claim whose accuracy scholars continue to debate.

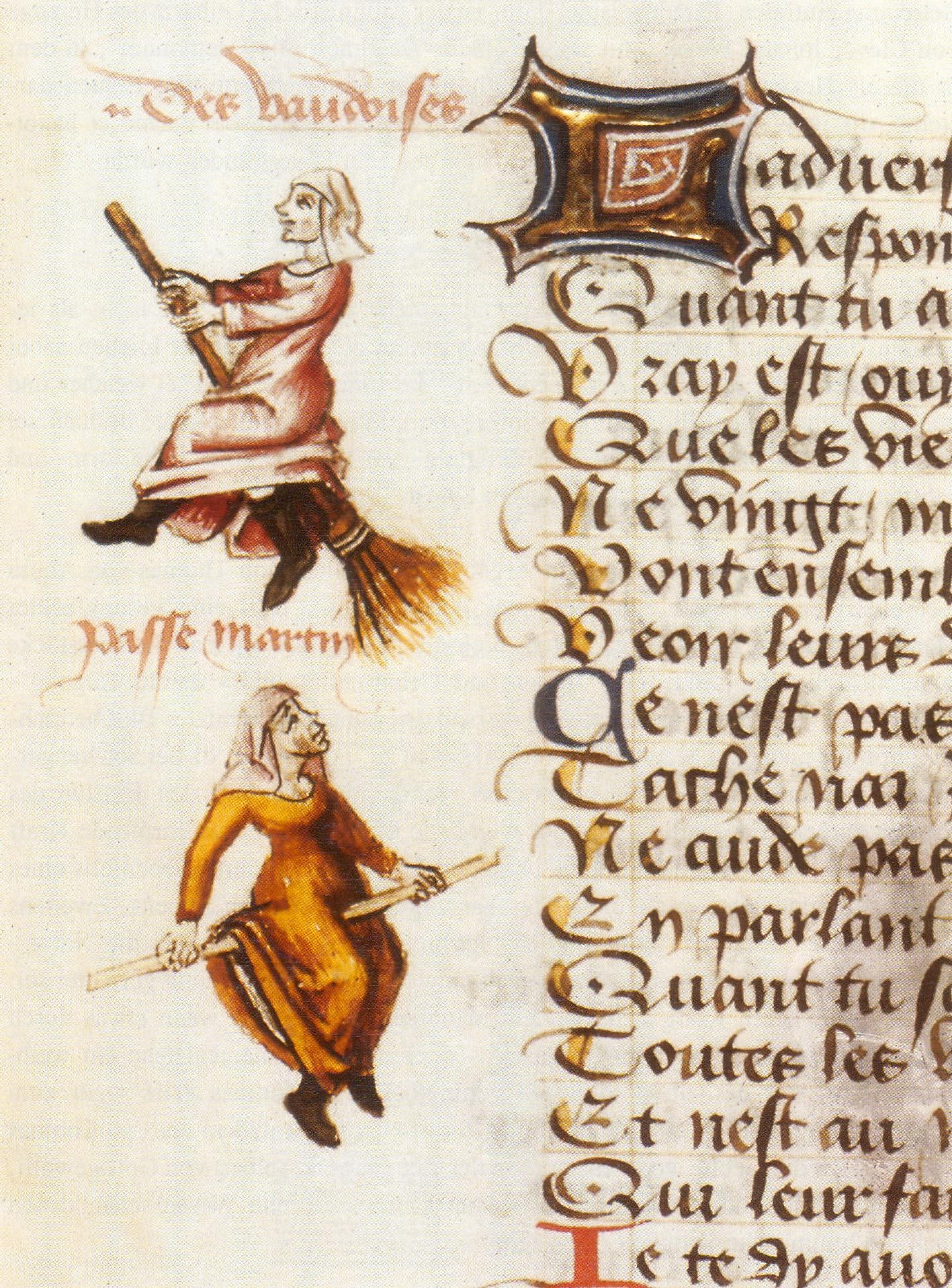
Illumination of two witches (one on a broomstick, the other on a stick) from Martin le Franc's Le Champion des Dames, 1451

== Works ==
Le Franc's most famous work was his huge, 24,000-verse composition Le Champion des Dames (The Champion of Ladies), dedicated to Philip the Good and dating from 1440 or 1442 (first printed in Lyon in 1485 and again in Paris in 1530). It was illuminated by Peronet Lamy. Written as a response to the misogynistic views in Roman de la Rose, Le Champion des Dames recounts the nobility and deeds of many women throughout history, including Joan of Arc. In the book, the allegorical Champion of Ladies, Franc Vouloir (Free Will), presents arguments against a series of opponents such as Brief Conseil (Hasty Judgement) and Lourd Entendement (Slow Wit). It also fiercely attacks corruption in government as well as the hedonistic luxury of the aristocratic class.

Another long poem by Le Franc is L'Estrif de Fortune et Vertu (1447–1448), which was also moralistic and didactic, presenting a debate between Fortune and Virtue.

Le Champion des Dames contains the earliest known depiction of a witch flying on a broomstick.

== Sources ==
- Strohm, Reinhard (2005). The Rise of European Music, 1380-1500. Cambridge, England: Cambridge University Press. ISBN 978-0-521-61934-9.
- Wright, Craig (2001). "Martin le Frenc". In Gallagher, Sean (ed.). Grove Music Online. Oxford, England: Oxford University Press. doi:10.1093/gmo/9781561592630.article.17928. ISBN 978-1-56159-263-0. (subscription, Wikilibrary access, or UK public library membership required)
- Le Franc, Martin. The Trial of Womankind: A Rhyming Translation of Book IV of the Fifteenth-Century Le Champion des Dames. Ed. and trans. Steven Millen Taylor. Jefferson, NC: McFarland & Co., 2005.
- Le Franc, Martin. The Conception of Mary -- A Rhyming Translation of Book V of Le Champion des Dames by Martin Le Franc (1410-1461). Ed. and trans. Steven Millen Taylor. Lewiston, NY: Edwin Mellen Press, 2010.
