= Isola di San Clemente =

Island in the Venetian Lagoon in Italy

- Location within Venetian Lagoon

Geography
- Coordinates: 45.411097°N 12.335585°E
- Adjacent to: Venetian Lagoon
- Area: 62,000 m^{2} (670,000 sq ft)
- Length: 380 m (1250 ft)
- Width: 230 m (750 ft)
- Highest elevation: 4 m (13 ft)

Administration
- Italy
- Region: Veneto
- Province: Province of Venice

Isola di San Clemente (San Clemente Island) is a small island in the Venetian Lagoon in Italy. For centuries, it housed a monastic settlement, and more recently, an asylum. It is now the site of a luxury hotel.

== Location ==
San Clemente Island lies in the Venetian Lagoon between Giudecca and the Lido. The island covers 6 hectares (15 acres), of which 1.34 hectares are built on.

== History ==
The island was first settled in 1131, when Venetian merchant Pietro Gattilesso funded the construction of the church of San Clemente and a hospice for pilgrims and soldiers destined for the Holy Land. The name is dedicated to Pope Clement I, who died as a martyr according to legend and who is the patron of seamen. The complex was run by Augustine canons, while the entire island was under the jurisdiction of the patriarch of Grado Enrico Dandolo. In 1288, the relics of Saint Anianus - the first successors of St. Mark as Patriarch of Alexandria - were brought to the San Clemente church.

After experiencing a slow decline in the course of the 14th century, San Clemente gained fresh life in 1432, when Pope Eugene IV moved the order of Lateran canons - also known as the Charity (Carità) - to the island. Thanks to donations provided by wealthy Venetian families, the canons began work on the restoration of the church and enlargement of the monastery.

In 1643, to fulfil a vow made during the plague epidemic that struck the city in 1630, Venetians funded the building of a new chapel, modelled on the Holy House of Loreto, inside the San Clemente church. This “church in a church” is still a main feature of the construction.

Camaldolese Hermits of Monte Corona purchased the island in 1645. The Venetian nobility provided them with financial assistance to restore the church and monastery, and expand the island to add additional houses to the complex. In 1652 the Morosini family sponsored the restoration of the church façade by Andrea Cominelli, in order to pay tribute to the family's members Francesco and Tommaso, who died in the War of Candia.

The fall of the Republic of Venice in 1797 impacted San Clemente. Also, owing to the suppression of religious orders by Napoleon, in 1810 the Camaldolese monks left the island, which became a military garrison.

From 1844, the island housed a mental hospital, illustrating the 'confinement of the mad' and their exclusion from society common to the period. This female asylum housed women of Venice who were considered insane, earning a reputation amongst Venetians who, in time, equated 'going to San Clemente' with going mad, much in the way 'Bedlam' has been referred to within England. According to historian Andrew Scull, Mussolini sent his first wife, Ida Dalser, to San Clemente, effectively incarcerating her. The asylum was abandoned in 1992 before being bought and developed into the hotel complex it houses today.

== Gateway to Venice ==
Between the 15th and 16th centuries, San Clemente became known as the “gateway to Venice”. It became standard practice to take the Bucentaur (Bucintoro), the Doge's ceremonial barge, to the island to meet distinguished visitors. On the return journey to the Grand Canal, the guests were entertained by a variety of spectacles and performances.

Writing of Venice in 1493, Marino Sanudo described the Bucentaur as “a marvel, in which the Prince and Senate go to any great lord visiting the city; they go to San Clemente or elsewhere, depending on the direction from which the visitor is coming”.

== Hotel ==
The church was restored in 2003 as part of a wider project that adapted the adjacent buildings for hotel use. The complex now forms part of San Clemente Palace Venice on San Clemente Island, in the Venetian Lagoon, with a scheduled boat connection between San Clemente Island and Piazza San Marco of approximately 15 minutes. In 2013, the Turkish conglomerate Permak Group acquired the property and announced a further renovation programme for the complex, and as of 2024 the property operates as San Clemente Palace Venice.

== Sources ==
- Giovanna Cecconello, Carlo Giuliani, Michele Sgobba, San Clemente: progetto per un'isola, CLUVA, 1980
- Martina Carraro, L'isola di San Clemente a Venezia. Storia, restauro e nuove funzioni, Carsa, 2003
- V. M. Coronelli, Isolario dell’Atlante Veneto, Venezia, 1696-1698
- "È ufficiale: venduta ai turchi di Permak l'isola di San Clemente". La Nuova di Venezia (in Italian). 19 September 2013.
