= Enrico Dandolo (patriarch) =

Venetian patriarch

- Patriarch of Grado
- Installed: 1134
- Term ended: 1182
- Predecessor: Giovanni VIII Segnale
- Successor: John VII Gradenigo

Personal details
- Born: c. 1092
- Died: 1182

Enrico Dandolo (c. 1092–1182) was Patriarch of Grado, Italy, from 1134 to 1182. A member of a noble Venetian Dandolo family, after his appointment he put the interests of the church ahead of all other concerns.

Dandolo supported reform of the clergy along the lines laid down by Bernard of Clairvaux. He was engaged in a long-running dispute over jurisdiction with Giovanni Polani, the Bishop of Castello. He also became involved in a dispute with the doge of Venice over lay involvement in church affairs. The dispute with the doge escalated when the doge supported the Byzantine Empire when it was invaded by the Normans. Venice had critically important economic ties with the empire, but it was in schism with Rome. Dandolo was exiled until the war was over. Later he was restored to authority and gained most of his objectives including recognition of the separation of church from state and of the supremacy of the Patriarchate of Grado over Venice.

== Early years ==
Enrico Dandolo was the uncle of the famous Doge of Venice, also called Enrico Dandolo. He grew up in the small parish of San Luca, where his contemporary the future doge Pietro Polani also lived.

In 1122 the doge Domenico Michiel launched a seaborne crusade to help Baldwin II of Jerusalem. Enrico Dandolo participated in the Venetian Crusade while in his early twenties. The Venetian fleet left on 8 August 1122, and invested Corfu, then a possession of the Byzantine Empire, with which Venice had a dispute over privileges. They abandoned the siege when they heard news that King Baldwin II had been taken prisoner, and reached the Palestinian coast in May 1123. On 15 February 1124 the Venetians began the siege of Tyre, which fell on 7 July 1124. The fleet passed through the Aegean Sea on the return voyage, pillaging Greek islands and forcing the Greeks to abandon the dispute and confirm their privileges. On his return Dandalo embarked on a career as a legal advocate.

== Patriarch ==
=== Jurisdictional disputes ===
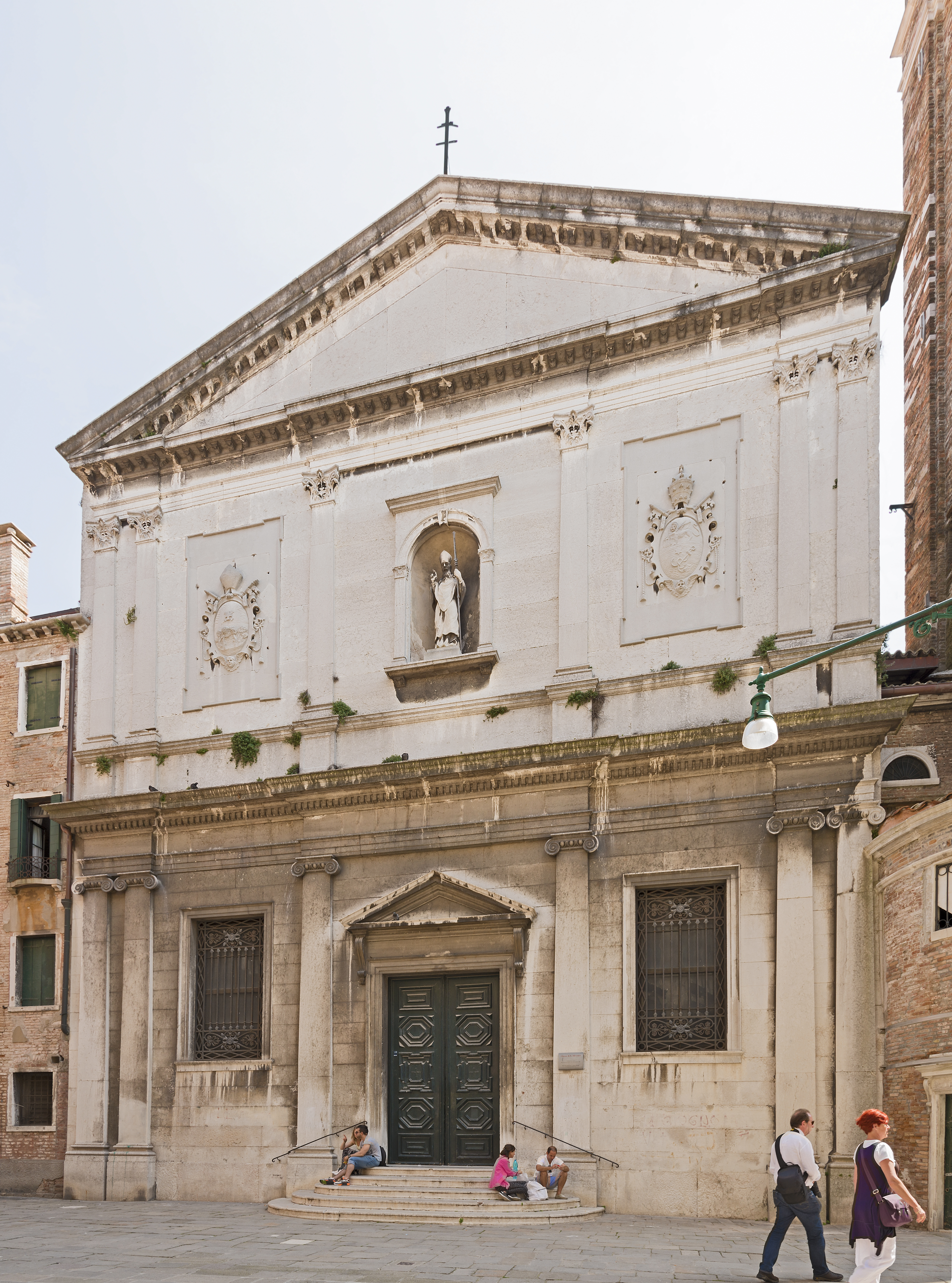
Church of San Silvestro, Venice, the base of the patriarch on Venice.

Dandalo was appointed Patriarch of Grado in 1134, nominated by his boyhood friend the doge Pietro Polani and accepted by the bishops of the lagoon. Dandolo succeeded Giovanni Gradenigo (1105–1131).

Dandolo was immediately thrown into the centuries-old dispute over jurisdiction with the Patriarchate of Aquileia. In 1132 Pope Innocent II had restored many of the traditional episcopates to Aquileia, including the Diocese of Istria, reducing Grado to the Venetian Lagoon. Dandalo went to the Council of Pisa in June 1135, as did the reformist Bernard of Clairvaux. The pope confirmed Grado's traditional rights and privileges, but would not restore the lost dioceses. Dandalo became a lifetime supporter of reform and a strong advocate for the freedom and rights of the church. On his return to Venice, Dandalo introduced a chapter of Cistercians to the monastery of San Giorgio di Pineto, the first of their order in the lagoon.

Dandalo became involved in a dispute with Giovanni Polani, the Bishop of Castello. One of the sources of tension was that by this time the patriarchs of Grado spent little time in Grado itself, but made their base the church of San Silvestro in Venice, within the jurisdiction of the diocese of Castello. In 1139, encouraged by Dandolo, the clergy of the ancient church of San Salvatore in central Venice decided to become canons regular under the rule of St. Augustine. The diocese had less control over such semi-monastic communities, some of which were directly linked to Rome. The clergy failed to confirm their subordination to the diocese. Polani was furious at what he saw as an attempt to take this important parish away from his control, and placed it under interdict. In response, Dandolo placed it under his metropolitan protection. On 13 May 1141 Pope Innocent II lifted the interdict, placed San Salvatore under his personal protection and sent two canons to instruct the congregation in the rule.

In 1141 Dandolo placed and blessed the foundation stone of the complex holding a church and hostel for pilgrims on the Isola di San Clemente. The island was given to canons regular. Dandolo expected it would come under the patriarchate of Grado, and this became a long-running cause of dispute with Polani. In August 1143 the cardinal-priest Goizo of Santa Cecilia visited Venice, and following this visit Pope Lucius II (1144–45) published clear definitions of the jurisdictions of Castello and Grado. Sometime between 1141 and 1145 the doge nominated a new abbess for the convent of San Zaccaria to replace Nella Michiel, who had died. Dandolo condemned this lay interference in election of the abbess, and disputed the doge's right to invest her. A new abbess was only confirmed in 1151, and was not a member of a leading Venetian family. It is unclear whether this was a victory for Dandalo, but certainly he had alienated the doge as well as the bishop.

=== Norman war ===
In 1147 a Norman fleet captured the island of Corfu from the Byzantines, then began to attack and loot the coastal towns of Greece, facing little serious resistance. In October 1147, the Emperor Manuel I Comnenus (1143–1480) sent an urgent request for help to Venice. The Doge Pietro Polani called for all Venetians to help prepare a fleet to attack the Normans in the spring. The trade with Byzantium was crucial to the Venetian economy, and Corfu also commanded the trade route to the east, but Dandalo opposed coming to the aid of the Greeks on the grounds that they were schismatic. Dandalo went against his family interests in this, and also took a position that the Pope could not support. The papacy was in a state of war with the Normans, although temporarily at truce, and the Byzantine emperor was providing valuable support for the Second Crusade.

This dispute culminated in the exile of the patriarch. In 1147 the doge had Dandolo expelled from Venice. All the houses of the Dandolo family were levelled. Dandolo fled to Rome, where Pope Eugene III (1145–1153) excommunicated the doge and placed an interdict on the whole city of Venice. The doge went ahead with a successful expedition against the Normans, in which he died.

=== Later years ===
The new doge Domenico Morosini (1148–1155) rescinded the exile and ordered reconstruction of the Dandolo family compound at the expense of the state. In late 1149 Morosini agreed that the lay rulers of Venice would not interfere with church affairs. On the other hand, prelates would no longer be involved in secular affairs. Dandalo returned to Venice in 1150 or 1151. In January 1153 Dandolo held a provincial synod in Venice to discuss a dispute between two parishes in the diocese of Murano. This choice of location was an assertion of authority over Castillo. In 1155 Dandolo was consecrated by Pope Hadrian IV (1154–59) as Primate of Dalmatia, with authority over the archdiocese of Zara. In October 1156 Bishop Polani was forced by the Pope to relinquish all claims against the church of San Clemente. In June 1157 Dandolo gained the authority to ordain Latin bishops in any Byzantine cities where Venice had churches, including Constantinople. The pope made it clear to the Venetians that Dandolo should be respected as their spiritual father.

In 1162, while Venice was involved in a war with Padua and Ferrara, the Patriarch Ulrich II of Aquileia attacked Grado. Dandolo was forced to flee to Venice. The doge Vitale II Michiel responded forcibly. He captured Ulrich and destroyed several of his castles in Friuli. Eventually Pope Alexander III intervened to make a peace. The doge's captives were released in exchange for payment of an annual tribute of a bull, twelve pigs and 300 loaves of bread. The animals would be slaughtered in a public ceremony to commemorate the victory.

Around 1170 Dandolo appointed Romano Mairano his agent for collecting revenues from the patriarchal properties in Constantinople in return for an annual payment of fifty pounds of Venetian pennies. This contract proved impossible to fulfil, since tensions and rivalries between the Greeks and Venetians in Constantinople led to the imperial government imprisoning the Venetians and seizing their assets in 1171.

The patriarch had an aula in Venice in 1153, and in 1164 there are mentions of a palacium beside San Silvestro. Pope Alexander III lodged in the palacium when he visited Venice in 1177. The church of San Silvestro was given the title to the ground floor of the palacium in 1182. At this time it was a substantial building, at least two stories high. It included a large hall and had a private chapel on the first floor.

Dandolo suggested merging the patriarchate of Grado and the episcopal see of Castello to Pope Alexander III, perhaps as early as 1177. In March 1179 Dandolo attended the Third Council of the Lateran in Rome. On 24 July 1180 he agreed to a final and formal resolution of the ancient disputes with the patriarchate of Aquileia. In the presence of Alexander III and Ulrich II of Aquileia he renounced his claims to the disputed dioceses in Istria and to the relics and treasures that Poppo of Aquileia had taken from Grado at the start of the 11th century. Dandolo died in 1182 and was succeeded by Giovanni Segnale, who was confirmed by Pope Clement III.

== See also ==
- Catholic Church in Italy
