= Pietro Polani =

Doge of Venice from 1130 to 1148

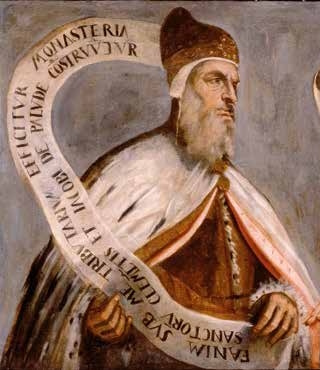
- Portrait in the Doge’s Palace

Doge of Venice
- In office 1130–1148
- Preceded by: Domenico Michiel
- Succeeded by: Domenico Morosini

Personal details
- Born: Unknown
- Died: 1148

Pietro Polani (died 1148) was the 36th Doge of Venice. He reigned from 1130 to 1148.

Polani was elected Doge over the protests of the Dandolo and Bado families because of his first marriage to Adelasa Michele, who was the daughter of his predecessor Domenico Michele. His opponents saw his election to Doge as a violation of a decree that sought to prevent public positions from being passed on through inheritance.

Polani's reign was characterized primarily by external threats to the Republic of Venice. Between 1133 and 1135 the Hungarians captured important Venetian bases on the Dalmatian coast, such as Sebenica, Trogir, and Split. In 1141 Padua tried to expand its territory and influence at the expense of Venice, and tried to subvert the monopoly the Venetians held over the salt trade. At the same time, Ancona was infringing on the Venetian border zone in the south. The political structure in Venice reacted to the complicated and dangerous situation by establishing a council of wise men (sapientes) to advise the Doge. The initially informal council included representatives of the previously dominant aristocracy as well as bankers and merchants. This gradually formed a new oligarchy that participated in ruling the state and during the ensuing centuries increasingly restricted the rights of the Doge. One of the first joint decisions by the sapientes and the Doge was the decision not to participate in the Second Crusade.

Venice won new influence in the eastern Mediterranean by assisting the Byzantine Empire against the Italo-Normans led by Roger II of Sicily. Many of the noble Venetian families were violently opposed to supporting Byzantium, and the Patriarch Enrico Dandolo fulminated against making a pact with the "schismatic" East. But not even an excommunication of Polani by the pope could convince the Venetians to forgo the valuable commercial rights they received in Chios, Cyprus, Rhodes, and Candia (Crete) through their alliance with the Byzantine Empire. Polani himself commanded the Venetian fleet against the Normans until sickness forced him to return prematurely to Venice where he died soon thereafter. The fleet went on without him to decisively defeat the Norman forces of George of Antioch at Cape Matapan in 1148.

Polani was buried in the San Cipriano monastery in Murano.

Political offices
Preceded by Domenico Michele	Doge of Venice; 1130–1147	Succeeded by Domenico Morosini
