= Patriarch of Grado =

Catholic patriarchate in north-eastern Italy until 15th century

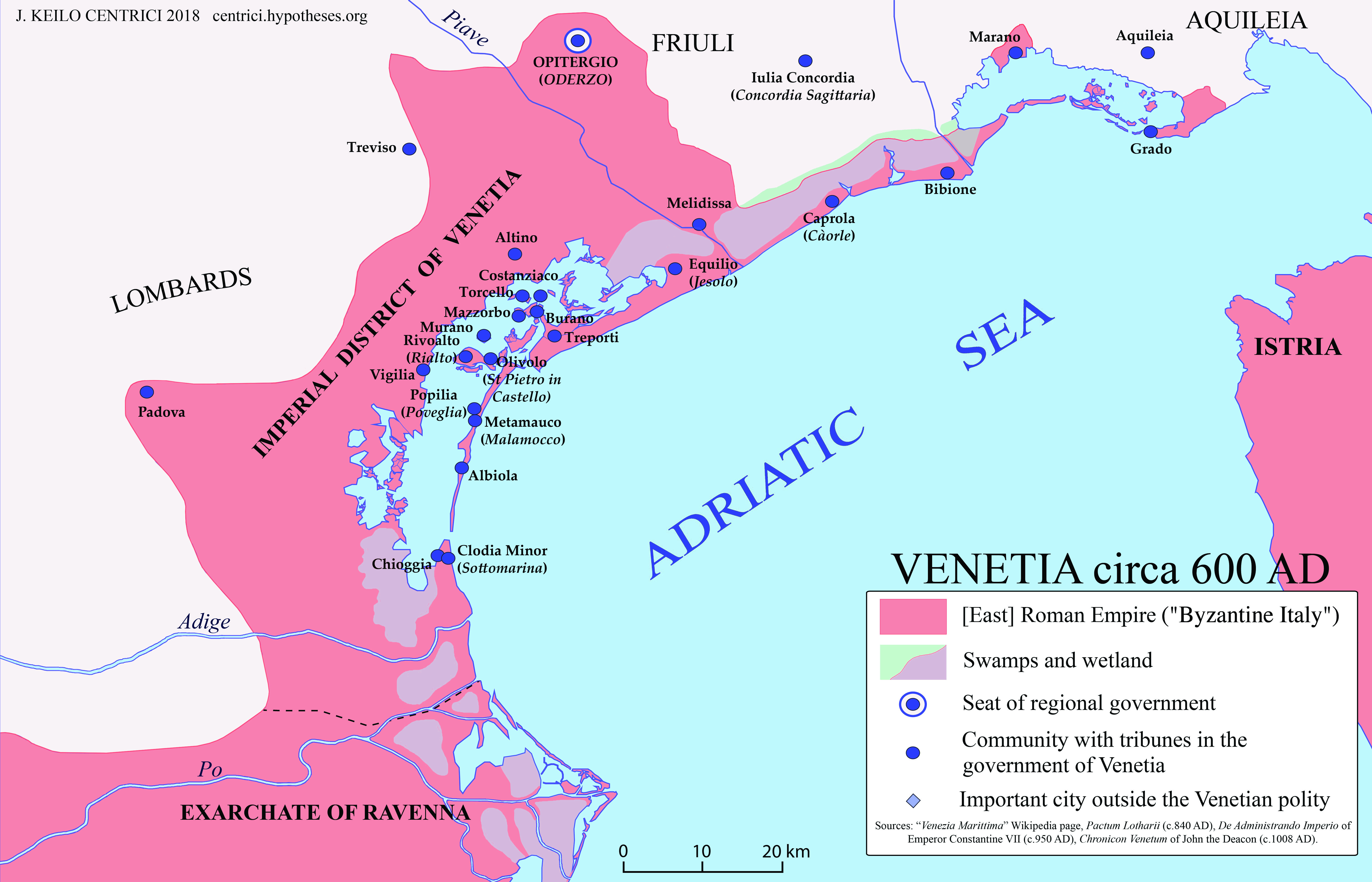
Political division between Byzantine and Lombard possessions in northern Adriatic, at the time of the Aquileian schism (beginning of the 7th century)

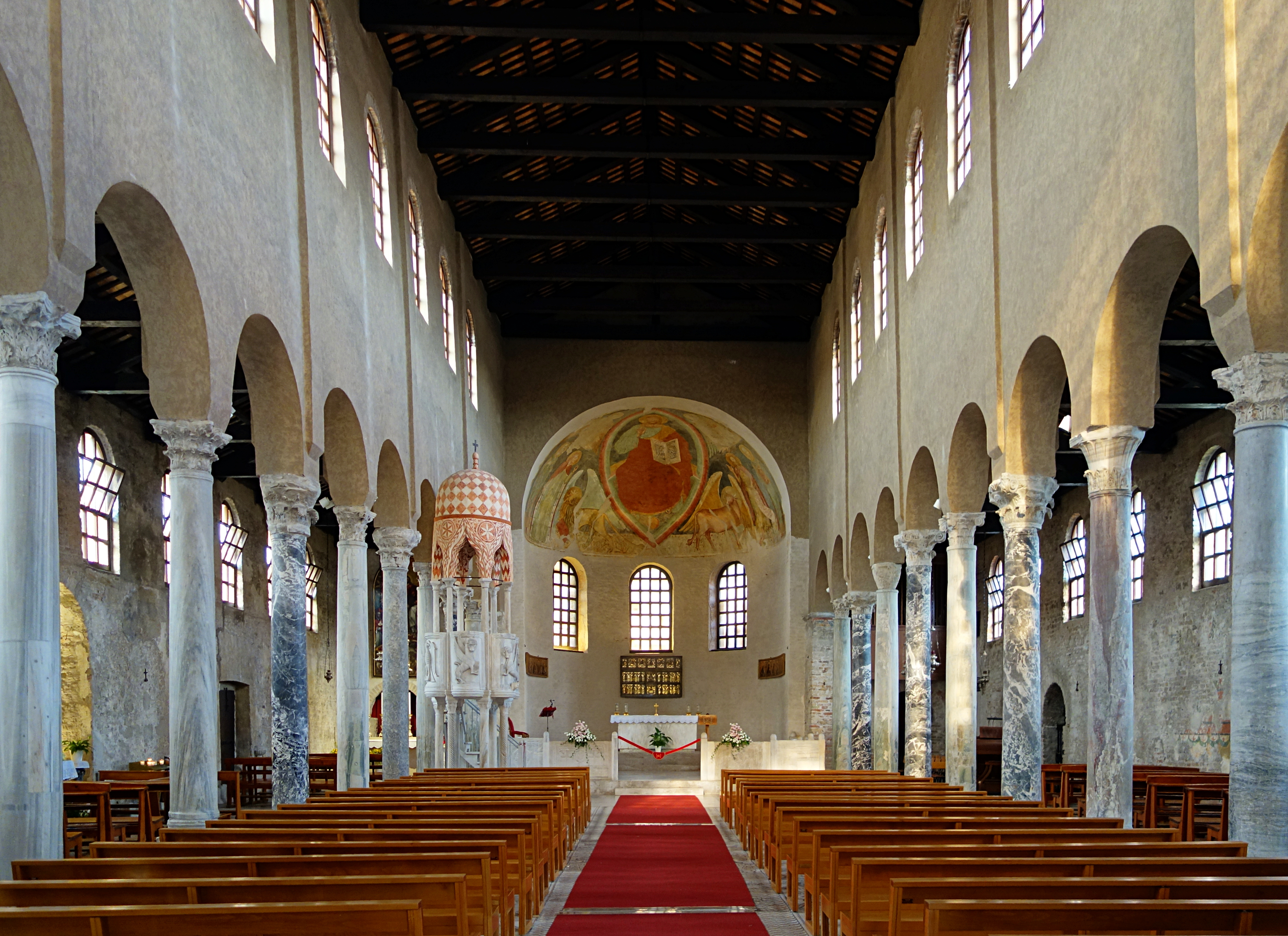
Interior of the Basilica of Sant'Eufemia, Grado

The Patriarchate of Grado, also known as the Patriarchate of New Aquileia, was an episcopal see and ecclesiastical province in northeastern Italy, centered in Grado, on the northern coasts of the Adriatic Sea. It was created as a result of an internal schism within the ancient Patriarchate of Aquileia. In 568, after the Lombard conquest of Aquileia, patriarch Paulinus left the city and fled to the minor coastal, but better protected town of Grado, that still remained under the Byzantine rule. First patriarchs who resided in Grado continued to exercise their jurisdiction over bishops in Lombard-held parts of the province, but at the very beginning of the 7th century a schism occurred, when bishops in Lombard regions elected their separate patriarch (Ioannes), who took residence in the old Aquileia, thus becoming rival to Candidianus of Grado. From that time, the region was divided between two distinctive jurisdictions: the Patriarchate of Old Aquileia in Lombard-held lands, and the Patriarchate of New Aquileia, with residence in Grado and jurisdiction over Byzantine possessions in the northern Adriatic (including Venice and Istria).

Initially, the patriarchs in Grado continued to claim the title of Patriarch of Aquileia, but in the early 700s it was gradually dropped and then officially changed to Patriarch of Grado. Throughout their history, the patriarchs of Grado, with the support of Venice and the Byzantines, fought military, politically, and ecclesiastically the patriarchs of old Aquileia, who were supported by the Lombards, and later the Carolingians and the Holy Roman Emperors.

In 774, the entire Lombard Kingdom, including old Aquileia, fell under the Frankish rule, and by 788–790, Byzantine Istria also fell in Frankish hands, while Grado remained under Byzantine rule. Thus, a base was created for the emergence of various disputes over metropolitan jurisdiction in Istria. By the Franco-Byzantine Treaty of Aachen, that was concluded in 812, cities of Grado and Venice, with coastal Dalmatia were left in Byzantine hands, while Istria was confirmed under the Frankish rule.

The dispute between Grado and Aquileia was partially resolved in 1132 by Pope Innocent II, who restored many of the traditional episcopal sees to Aquileia, including the dioceses of Istria, while confirming jurisdiction of Grado over the Venetian Lagoon, and extending it over the east-Adriatic island sees of Arbe, Veglia and Ossero. Only in 1180, the remaining old-standing disputes between two patriarchates over jurisdiction in Istria were resolved by mutual agreement, in favor of old Aquileia.

Adrian IV placed the Archdiocese of Zadar under the jurisdiction of the Patriarchate of Grado, making it a true patriarchate with a metropolitan see under it, the only patriarchate of this kind in Western Europe besides Rome. After 1349, the patriarch of Grado and his subordinates were chosen by the Venetian Senate, and the names merely sent to Rome for confirmation.

In 1451, with the papal bull Regis aeterni, Nicholas V merged the see of Grado with Castello to form the Archdiocese of Venice. The Patriarch of Venice derived its patriarchal rank from Grado. Throughout its existence, the Patriarchate of Grado was tied to the rising and powerful city of Venice, which was in the ecclesiastical jurisdiction of Grado, rather than to the small city of Grado. The Patriarchs often resided in the church of San Silvestro in Venice where they were officially 'visitors', since canon law did not allow them to reside permanently in territory of another diocese (Venice was part of the Diocese of Castello).

== List of the Patriarchs of Grado ==
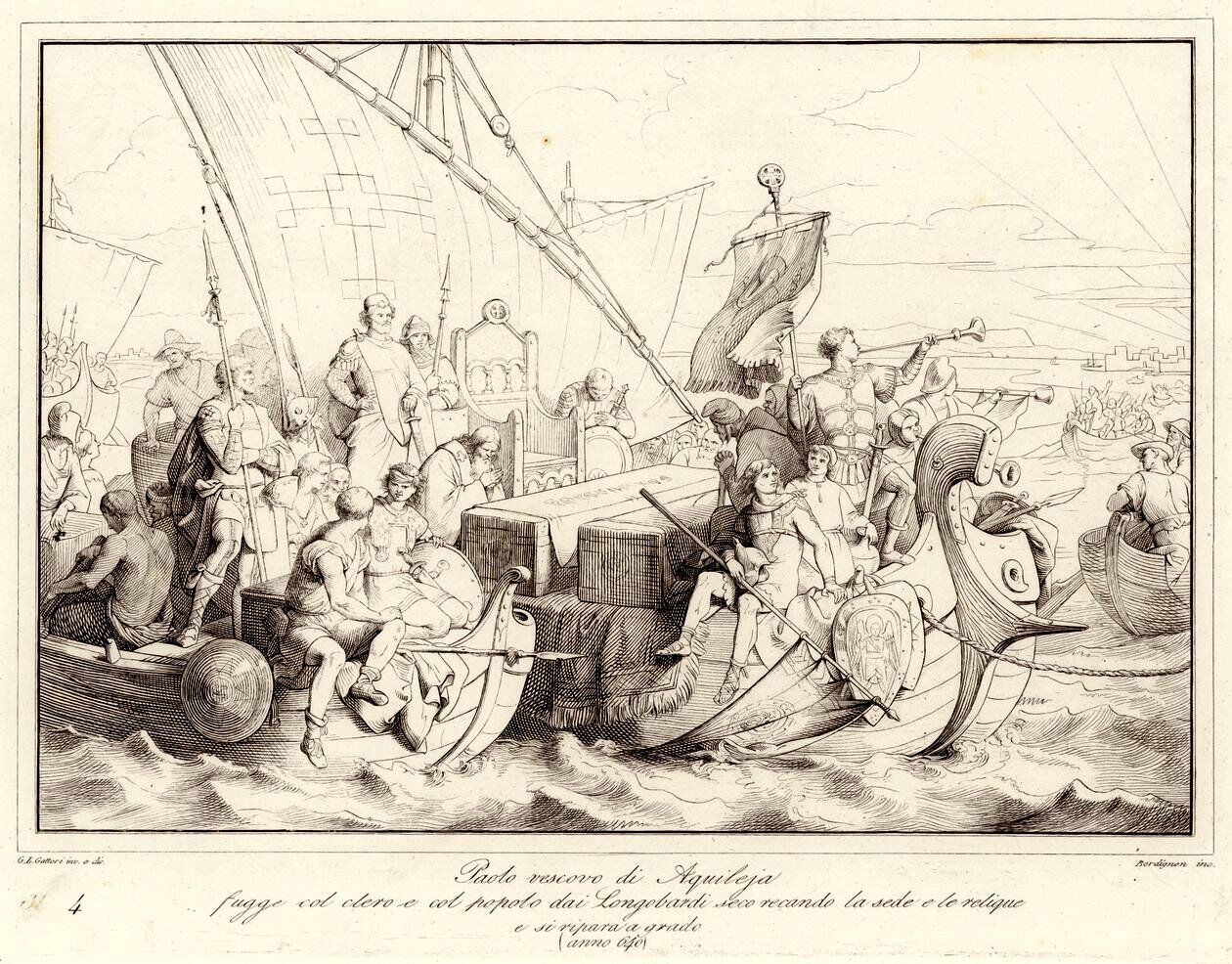
19th-century depiction of Paulinus' flight to Grado

List of the Patriarchs of new Aquileia/Grado is not complete for the oldest periods, but from the 12th century data are quite complete.

=== Patriarchs of Aquileia, in Grado (before the split) ===
- Paulinus I 557–569
- Probinus 569–570
- Hilarius of Aquileia (Elia) 571–586
- Severus 586–606

=== Patriarchs of new Aquileia-Grado (after the split) ===
- Candidianus (606–612)
- Epiphanius (612–613)
- Cyprianus (613–627)
- Fortunatus I (627–628)
- Primogenius (630–647)
- Maximus II (649–?)
- Stephanus II (670–672)
- Agatho (?–679)
- Christophorus (682–717)
- Donatus (717–725)
- Antoninus (725–747)
- Emilianus (747–755)
- Vitalianus (755–767)
- Giovanni IV degli Antinori (767–802)
- Fortunatus II (802–820)
- Giovanni V (820–825)
- Venerius Trasmondo (825–851)
- Victor I (852–858)
- Vitalis I Partecipazio (858–?)
- Petrus I Marturio (875–878)
- Victor II Partecipazio (878–?)
- Georgius (?)
- Vitalis II (?)
- Domenicus I Tribuno (904–?)
- Dominicus II (919–?)
- Laurentius Mastalico (?)
- Marinus Contarini (933–?)
- Bonus Blancanico (?–960)
- Vitalis III Barbolani (?)
- Vitalis IV Candiano (976–1017)
- Orso Orseolo (1018–1026, 1030–1049)
- Domenicus III Bulzano (?)
- Dominicus IV Marango (?)
- Dominicus V Cerbano (1074–1077)
- Johannes VI Saponario (?)
- Petrus II Badoer da Noale (1092–1105)

=== Patriarchs of new Aquileia-Grado, residing in Venice ===
- Giovanni Gradenigo (1105–1108, 1112–1129)
- Enrico Dandolo (1134–1182)
- Giovanni Segnale (1182–1201)
- Benedetto Falier (1201–1207)
- Angelo Barozzi (1211–1238)
- Leonardo Querini (1238–1244)
- Lorenzo (1244–1255)
- Jacopo Belligno (1255)
- Angelo Maltraverso (1255–1272)
- Giovanni da Ancona (1272–1279)
- Guido (1279–1289)
- Lorenzo di Parma (1289–1295)
- Egidio da Ferrara (1295–1310)
- Angelo Motonense (1310–1313)
- Paolo de Pilastris (1313–1316)
- Marco de Vinea (1316–1318)
- Domenico (1318–1332)
- Dino di Radicofani (1332–1337)
- Andrea da Padova (1337–1355)
- Orso Delfino (1355–1361)
- Fortanerius Vassalli 1361
- Francesco Querini (1367–1372)
- Thomas of Frignano (1372–1383)
- Urbano (1383–1389)
- Pietro Amelio (1389–1400)
- Pietro Chauchus (1400–1406)
- Giovanni de Zambottis de Mantua (1406–1408)
- Francesco Lando (1408–1409)
- Leonardo Delfino (1409–1427)
- Biagio Molino (1427–1439)
- Marco Condulmer (1439–1445)
- Domenico Michiel (1445–1451)

== Titular Archbishops of Grado ==
In 1968 Pope Paul VI reestablished Grado as a titular archbishopric

- José López Ortiz (1969–1992)
- Crescenzio Sepe (1992–2001)
- Diego Causero (2001–present)

== See also ==
- Patriarchate of Aquileia
- Patriarchate of Old Aquileia
- Patriarchal State of Aquileia
- Aquileian rite
- List of bishops and patriarchs of Aquileia
- Titular Archbishop of Aquileia
- Patriarch of Venice
- Archbishop of Udine
- Placitum of Riziano

== Bibliography ==
- Banić, Josip; Blancato, Sebastiano (2023). "The Agreement between the Patriarchate of Grado and the Patriarchate of Aquileia Regarding the Metropolitan Jurisdiction over Istrian Bishoprics (24th of July, 1180): New Critical Edition of the Charter" (PDF). Zgodovinski časopis. 77 (167): 8–37. Archived from the original (PDF) on 10 June 2025.
- Cerno, Marianna (2017). "Holding the Aquileian patriarchate's title: The key role of local early-ninth-century hagiography". Imperial Spheres and the Adriatic: Byzantium, the Carolingians and the Treaty of Aachen (812). London & New York: Routledge. pp. 140–151.
- Dursteler, Eric, ed. (2013). A Companion to Venetian History, 1400-1797. Leiden-Boston: Brill.
- Krahwinkler, Harald (2005). "Patriarch Fortunatus of Grado and the Placitum of Riziano" (PDF). Acta Histriae. 13 (1): 63–78.
- Luthar, Oto, ed. (2008). The Land Between: A History of Slovenia. Frankfurt am Main: Peter Lang.
- Meyendorff, John (1989). Imperial unity and Christian divisions: The Church 450-680 A.D. Crestwood, NY: St. Vladimir's Seminary Press. ISBN 978-0-88141-056-3.
- Nicovich, John Mark (2009). "The poverty of the Patriarchate of Grado and the Byzantine-Venetian Treaty of 1082". Mediterranean Historical Review. 24 (1): 1–16. doi:10.1080/09518960903000736.
- Štih, Peter (2010). The Middle Ages between the Eastern Alps and the Northern Adriatic: Select Papers on Slovene Historiography and Medieval History. Leiden-Boston: Brill.
- Vicelja-Matijašić, Marina (2005). "Byzantium and Istria: Some Aspects of Byzantine Presence in Istria" (PDF). Acta Histriae. 13 (1): 185–204.
- Wickham, Chris (1981). Early Medieval Italy: Central Power and Local Society, 400-1000. Totowa, NJ: Barnes & Noble.
