= Croatian–Venetian wars =

Series of medieval conflicts

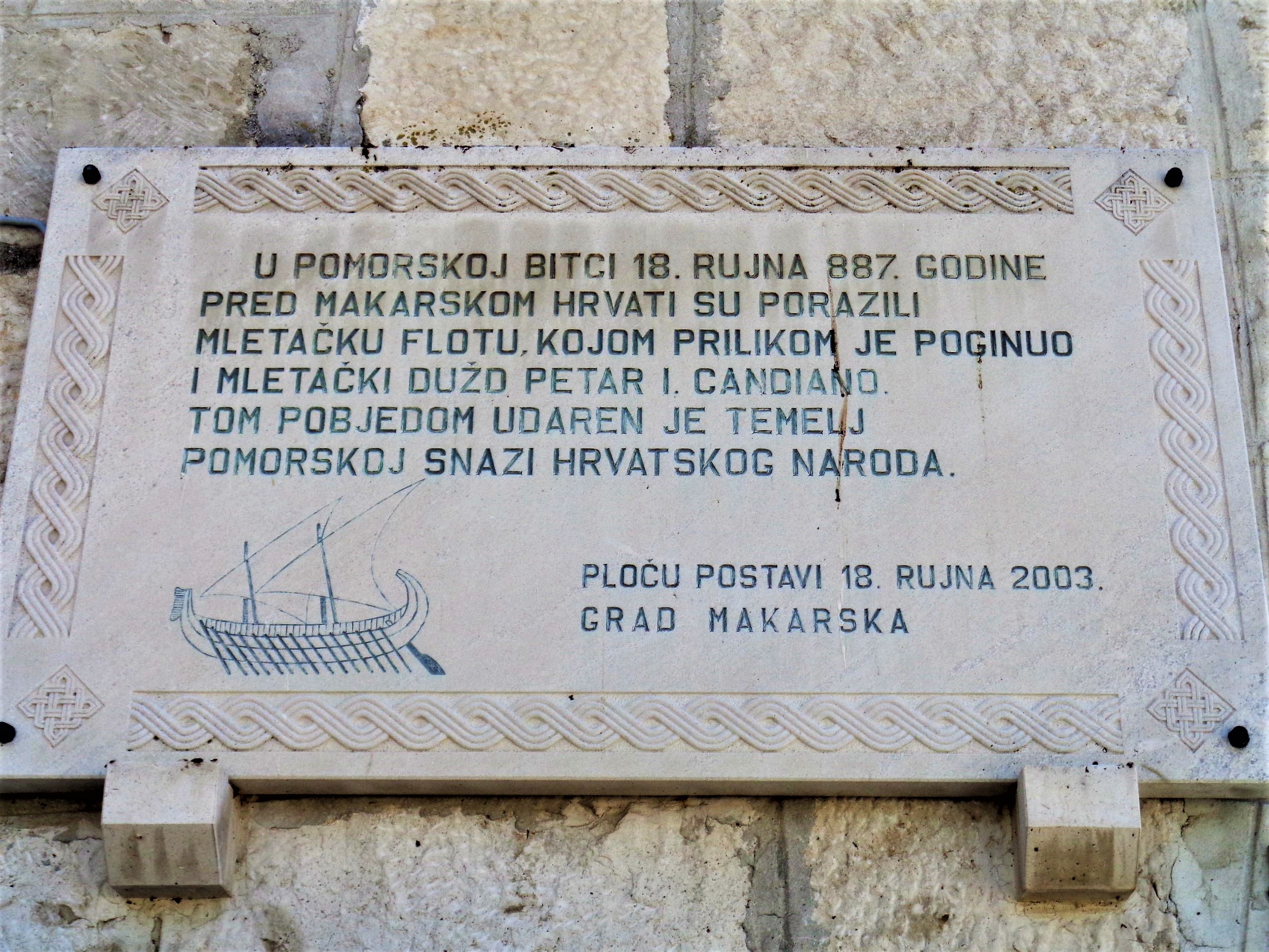
- Commemorative plaque of a Croatian–Venetian battle at Makarska
Date	7th century – 15th century
Location	Dalmatia, Croatian Littoral, Istria
Territorial changes	Establishment of Venetian Dalmatia

Belligerents
7th c. – 10th c.: Duchy of Croatia; Narentines; 10th c. – 1102: Kingdom of Croatia; 1102 – 1420: Kingdom of Croatia; Kingdom of Hungary	Republic of Venice

Commanders and leaders
Duke Mislav; Prince Družak (Drosaico); Duke Trpimir; Duke Domagoj; Duke Branimir; King Svetoslav Suronja; King Krešimir III; Prince Berigoj (Berigui); King Stjepan I King Petar Krešimir IV; King Coloman; King Béla II; King Béla III; King Louis I	Doges of Venice (Republic of Venice) Giovanni I Participazio (Republic of Venice) Pietro Tradonico (Republic of Venice) Orso I Participazio (Republic of Venice) Pietro I Candiano † (Republic of Venice) Pietro III Candiano (Republic of Venice) Pietro II Orseolo (Republic of Venice) Otto Orseolo (Republic of Venice) Domenico I Contarini (Republic of Venice) Ordelafo Faliero † (Republic of Venice) Domenico Michele (Republic of Venice) Enrico Dandolo (Republic of Venice) Andrea Dandolo (Republic of Venice) Giovanni Dolfin

The Croatian–Venetian wars, also Croatian-Hungarian-Venetian wars, is the name given to a series of intermittent conflicts fought in the Middle Ages by Venice against Croatia and Hungary over control of the Adriatic Sea, its trade routes, and of the people, city-states, and hinterlands of the Sea's eastern coast—Dalmatia and the Croatian Littoral in particular.

It was in fact not a conventionally-understood war occurring between two rivals at a moment in time but rather a string of individual naval and land engagements involving multiple belligerents spanning over seven centuries, from their origin in the 600s CE to the conclusion in 1420.

The two principle belligerents in the Wars in their various political incarnations were:

- The city-state of and then Republic of Venice
- The Duchy of Croatia, its successor state the Duchy of Croatia, then as the Kingdom of Croatia and Dalmatia in personal union with Hungary.

Other actors included, at times, polities in Zachlumia and on the Istrian peninsula (the latter ruled by the German feudal families).

== Historical Overview ==
The two polities took on political form throughout the 7th and 8th centuries, and as rival Adriatic powers, came into conflict almost immediately. Conflicts intensified in the 9th century, lessened during the 10th century, and then re-ignited in the beginning of the 11th century.

In the year 1000 Venetian forces began subjugating coastal towns of the Byzantine Theme of Dalmatia. This was a territory that been ceded from the Byzantine Emperor to the Croatian King.

In the 1030s, Croatian kings Stephen I and his son Peter Krešimir IV regained much of this territory.

In 1085, however, Venice re-conquered and annexed the Croatian Littoral.

During the 12th century, after Croatia entered a personal union with the Kingdom of Hungary, Croato-Hungarian kings Coloman and Béla II reclaimed large swathes of Dalmatia and the Littoral, but conflicts with Venice continued periodically. Later Croatian–Venetian wars had become theaters of the wider Hungarian–Venetian Wars. When Louis the Great, the new young king (ruled 1342–1382), decided to expel Venetians from his country, he launched a large campaign in 1356–1358 and forced them to withdraw from Dalmatia. The Zadar Peace Treaty was signed on 18 February 1358 and Venice renounced its claim to the entire Croatian coast from eastern Istria to southern Dalmatia.

In 1409 the Republic of Venice took advantage of a Croatia of the dynastic struggle that occurred and bought Dalmatia for 100,000 ducats from the Croatian pretender to the throne Ladislaus of Naples. Venice then established the new colony of Venetian Dalmatia. The Venetian victory at the Battle of Motta confirmed this acquisition. The Croatian Littoral and eastern Istria remained parts of Croatia. Here, Croats and their allies rejected Venetian rule and joined in fighting Venice in the 1511-1514 War of the Holy League and the Uskok War. By the early 16th century, with the changing political landscapes of Central Europe and the Balkans and the emergence of the Hapsburg Austria and the Ottoman Empire as Continental powers, the Croatian-Venetian Wars were subsumed into the Ottoman–Venetian wars and Habsburg–Venetian wars.

== Warfare until 887 ==
Conflicts between Venetians and Croats, as well as other Slavic nations or tribes on the Adriatic coast, including Narentines, began very early, in the 7th and 8th century, because the Venetians demanded free passage for their merchant galleys and did not want to pay taxes to Croats. In the 9th century Venetian Doge Giovanni I Participazio fought against Narentines, but concluded a peace treaty in 830. A few years later another warfare broke out, but ended with a new peace treaty of 839 among Doge Pietro Tradonico, Duke Mislav of Croatia and Prince Družak (Drosaico) of the Narentines. Occasional hostilities started again a bit later and repeated several times during next years.

The situation even worsened after Duke Domagoj acceded the Croatian throne (ruled 864–876). John the Deacon, Venetian Chronicler, wrote at the beginning of the 11th century that Domagoj was pessimus Sclavorum dux (meaning the worst Duke of Slavs), because of the latter's numerous wars, especially against the Venice and the Arabs. The Venetian navy under command of Doge Orso I Participazio attacked Croatian territory in 865, having some success, and another peace agreement followed, securing the safe passage of Venetian ships in the Adriatic Sea. In 871 or 872 a new intense naval-commercial war on the sea between Croats and Venetians broke out, ending after Domagoj's death.

One of the decisive battles for dominance in the Adriatic Sea in that period happened on 18. September 887 between the Narentines and Venetians at Makarska. Doge Pietro I Candiano led personally his fleet in a campaign against Narentines but they crushed his forces and killed him in the battle.

== Situation between 887 and 1000 ==
Following Pietro Candiano's death, the Venetians started to pay Croats and Narentines an annual tribute for the right to sail and trade in the northeastern Adriatic. Between 887 and 948 there was no new war recorded between Venetians and Croats. In 948 Doge Pietro III Candiano launched a naval campaign to combat Narentines, but his military attempt failed. The result was a peace treaty that made the Most Serene Republic of Venice pay taxes for safe passage for the next 50 years.

This situation lasted until the end of the 10th century. Having come to power, Doge Pietro II Orseolo began the period of southeastern expansion of Venice, refusing to pay tribute to Croats and launching military expeditions against them. After the death of King Stjepan Držislav in 997, Kingdom of Croatia was weakened due to the dynastic crisis and civil war that broke out among his three sons for the throne succession. This enabled Venetians in the following years to take control over Croatian towns and islands in the theme of Dalmatia.

== Warfare after 1000 ==
The Venetian fleet led by Orseolo succeeded in taking over coastal towns from Rab (Arba) in the north to Dubrovnik (Ragusa) in the south, including islands of Vis (Issa), Lastovo (Lagosta) and Korčula (Curzola), either with using armed forces or calm surrender. The bloodiest conflict was the battle of Lastovo in 1000, at the end of which the town of Lastovo was completely destroyed and the survivors displaced.

The Republic of Saint Mark secured its suzerainty over the area until the 1030s, after which the Croatian King Stjepan I, having come to power, took control over the town of Zadar. He and his son Petar Krešimir IV succeeded in taking other coastal towns back from Venetians. Since 1085 however, following the Byzantine–Venetian Treaty of 1082, Venice subsequently conquered a large part of the Croatian coastal and maritime territory.

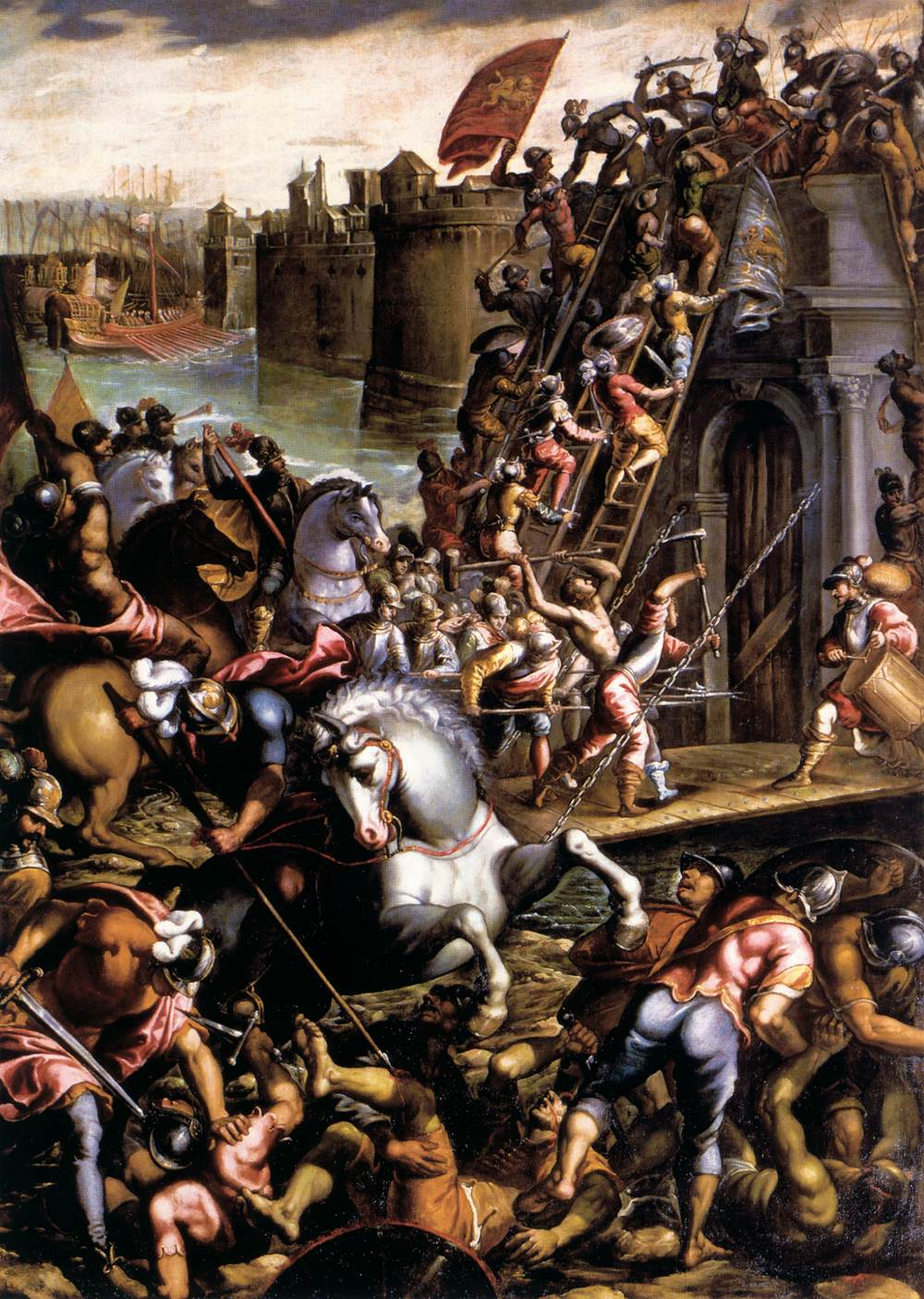
Depiction of the Siege of Zadar made by Andrea Vicentino

In 1105 the new Croatian king, Coloman of Hungary, launched campaign against Venetians, which was approved by Byzantine Emperor, and returned the northeastern Adriatic coast under the crown. Ten years later, Doge Ordelafo Faliero managed to retake some of the disputed area: he conquered Zadar and several other towns but lost his life in a battle. A peace treaty was then concluded, according to which Zadar devolved upon Venice, while Biograd, Šibenik, Trogir and Split remained in the Kingdom of Croatia in personal union with Hungary.

A new Venetian military campaign was undertaken in 1125 and Doge Domenico Michele's forces captured Split and Trogir. King Béla II liberated these two towns in 1133, but until the end of the 12th century several further naval campaigns of Venice followed, so that the warfare was almost permanent. In 1180 King Béla III managed to free Zadar and the whole area between the rivers Krka and Neretva. Since Venetians did not give up subjugating Zadar, another war between Venice and the town of Zadar (supported by the King) broke out and lasted twenty years (1183–1203), ending with the Crusaders' capture of the town.

=== Crusaders' capture of Zadar in 1202 ===
The Crusaders' capture of Zadar was a consequence of an agreement between the crusaders and the Republic of Venice for transport across the sea, whose price far exceeded what the crusaders were able to pay. As a solution Venetians proposed that the crusaders help them capture Zadar, a constant battleground between Venice on one side and Croatia and Hungary on the other.

Although many crusaders had refused to take part in the siege of the catholic town, the attack started in November 1202. After fierce fighting, Zadar fell on 24 November and the Venetians and the crusaders pillaged the town. After spending the winter in Zadar, the crusaders continued their campaign (Fourth Crusade) in the first days of the springtime. In 1203, Pope Innocent excommunicated the whole crusading army, along with the Venetians, for taking part in this attack, but Zadar remained under the control of Venice.

== Period between 1203 and 1358 ==
During the periodical Venetian reign in Zadar in the 13th century and the first half of the 14th century, the citizens of Zadar rebelled several times against the authorities of the Most Serene Republic and had support of the Croato-Hungarian kings. Major armed conflicts were recorded in 1242, 1247, 1311 and 1345–1346.

At the same time, the Venetian authorities forced Dubrovnik to accept their governor, after the local Rector Damjan Juda refused it and committed suicide in 1205. Having installed its own governor, Venice subsequently took control over the southernmost part of Croatian lands.

In the north, Venetians ruled western and southern Istria from the 13th and 14th century, after military interventions in major towns, as follows: in Pula in 1148, 1243, 1267, 1331 and 1397; in Rovinj in 1283, in Poreč in 1354, in Novigrad in 1270 and 1358, in Umag in 1269 and 1370. The Republic wanted all the time to take central and eastern Istria as well, but never succeeded in achieving permanent control over Pazin area and eastern coast of the peninsula, despite many heavy military clashes with their German owners, whose seat was in the Pazin Castle. Although the local population was primarily Croatian, the feudal owners were of German descent and carried the title of Margraves of Istria.

In 1342 Louis the Angevin became Croato-Hungarian king and the pushing of Venetian forces from the northeastern Adriatic area soon became one of the principal goals of his foreign policy. In 1346 he tried to help citizens of Zadar during the Venetian siege, but failed. In 1347, King Louis I strengthened his position in Dalmatia by taking the strategically important fortress of Ostrovica, near Bribir, from the Šubić family and in return gave to them estates in the vicinity of Zrin. In summer 1356 he launched a large military campaign and attacked all the Venetian held territories of his country. Within a year and a half, his armies entered Zadar, Split, Trogir, Šibenik and other Croatian coastal towns. In the Treaty of Zadar, which was signed on 18 February 1358 in the Monastery of St. Francis, the Republic of Venice renounced all Dalmatian towns and islands between the Gulf of Kvarner and the Town of Drač/Durazzo (in present-day Albania) in favour of King.

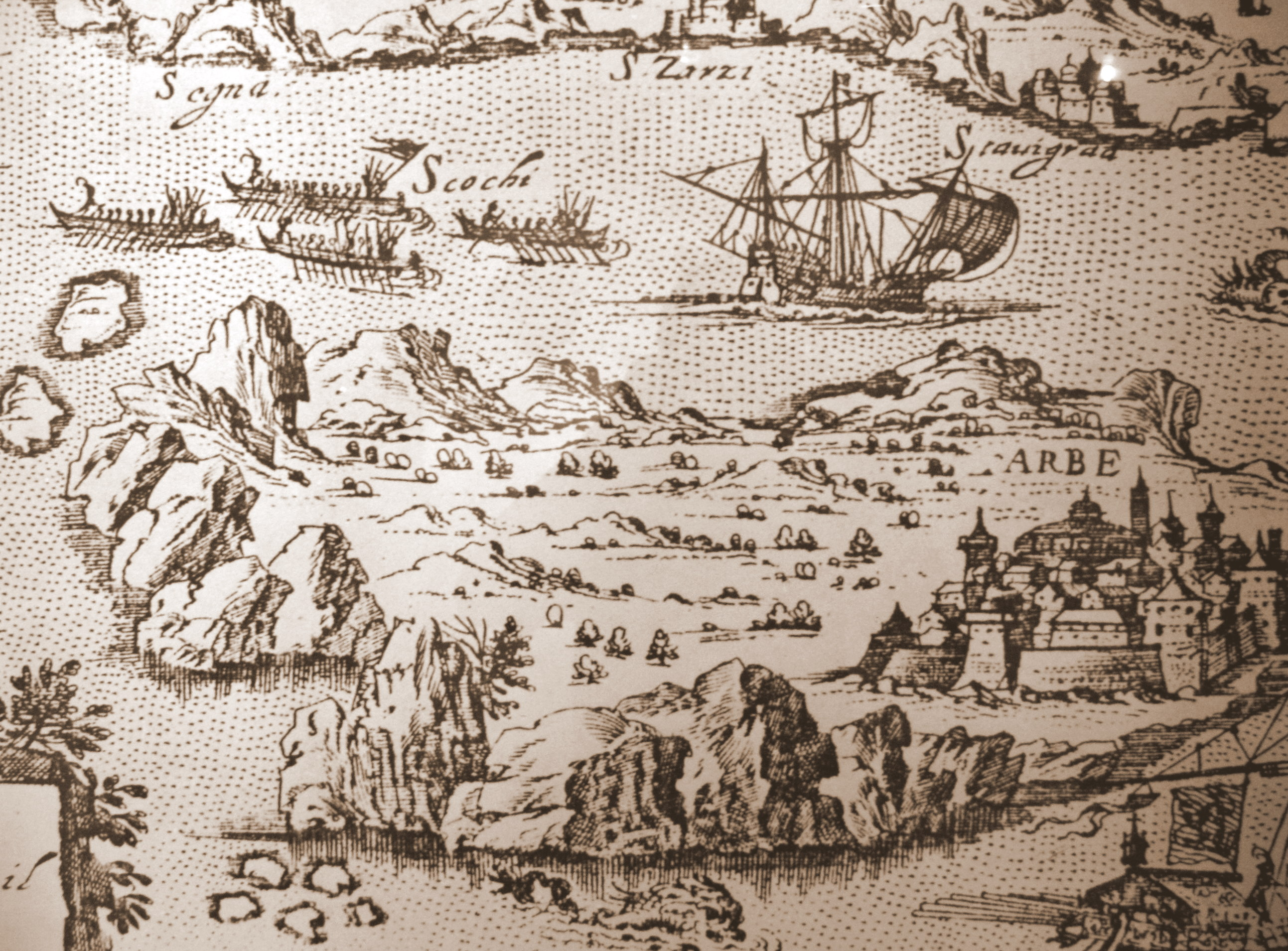
Uskoks attacking Venetian galley during the Uskok War

== Situation after 1358 ==
The peace period after the Treaty of Zadar lasted in Dalmatia approximately 50 years. Following the dynasty crisis at the end of the 14th and the beginning of the 15th century, and the struggle for the crown between Sigismund of Luxembourg and Ladislaus of Naples, the latter sold in 1409 his rights over Dalmatia to the Republic of Venice for the sum of 100,000 ducats. This led to the formation of the Venetian Dalmatia, while Croatian Littoral, including the island of Krk, remained part of Croatia. Sigismund waged a war on Venice between 1411 and 1412, which ended with the battle of Motta. After a truce, the war resumed but came to an end by 1420, when the Dalmatian coast was firmly occupied by Venice.

Several decades later a new rising military force came to the area from the east, the mighty Ottoman Empire, and caused a new series of wars on the Croatian coast: Ottoman–Venetian wars, Ottoman–Habsburg wars and Habsburg–Venetian wars (which included War of the Holy League, Uskok War and others).

== See also ==
- Timeline of the Republic of Venice
- Timeline of Croatian history
- History of the Croatian Navy
- History of the Byzantine Empire
- History of the Republic of Venice
- History of Croatia
