= Pietro Tribuno =

Doge of Venice from 887/8 to 911

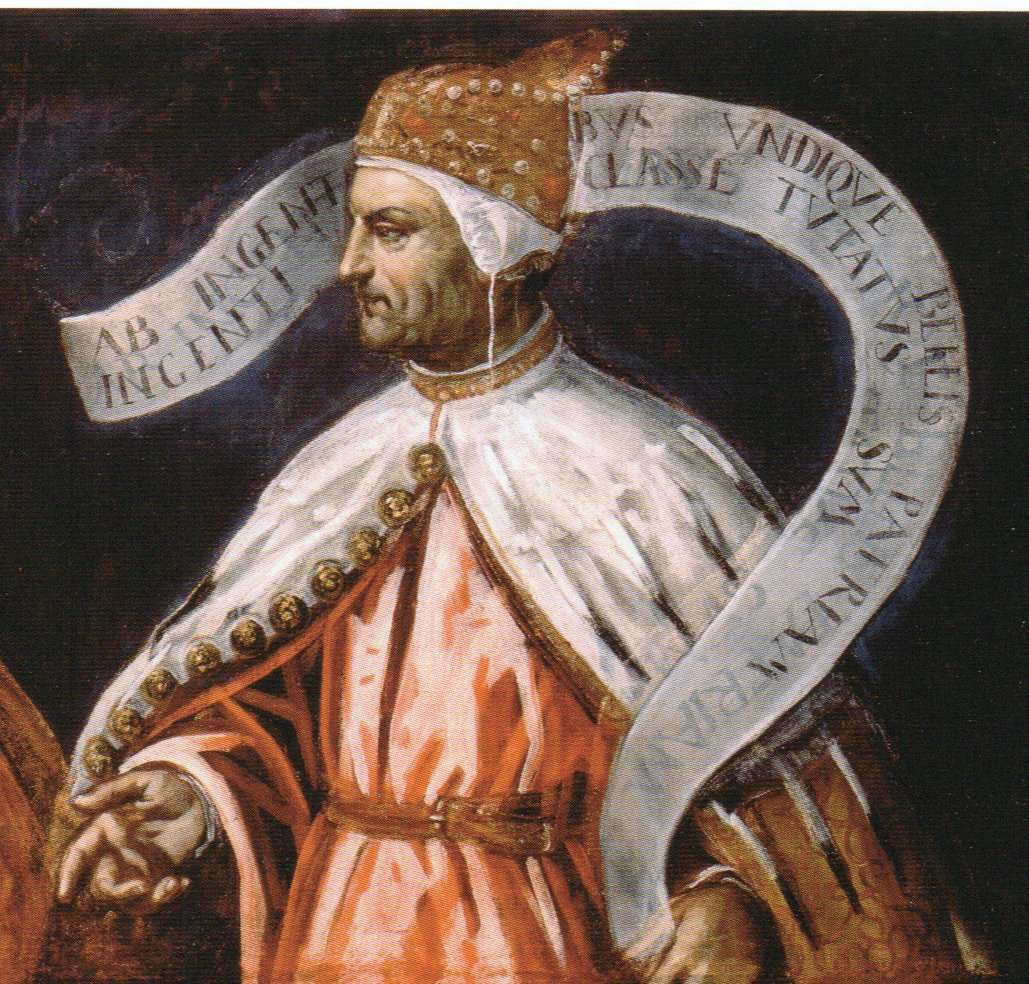
- Portrait in the Doge’s Palace

Doge of Venice
- Reign: 887/8 - c. 911
- Predecessor: Giovanni II Participazio
- Successor: Orso II Participazio
- Born: Unknown; Venice
- Died: c. 911; Venice
- Burial: Church of San Zaccaria
- Spouse: Angela Sanudo
- Issue: Pietro; Domenico, Patriarch of Grado
- Father: Domenico
- Mother: Agnella

Pietro Tribuno (died c. 911) was the Doge of Venice from either late 887 or early 888 until his death. The surname Tribuno is a later attribution, first recorded by the chronicler John the Deacon in 1008.

His reign was characterized by political stability, the renewal of Venice's commercial privileges with the Kingdom of Italy, and continued cooperation with the Byzantine Empire. He successfully repelled a Magyar attack on the Venetian lagoon in 899, one of the republic's earliest major military victories, and oversaw significant urban development, including the strengthening of Venice's fortifications and infrastructure.

== Biography ==
=== Early life ===
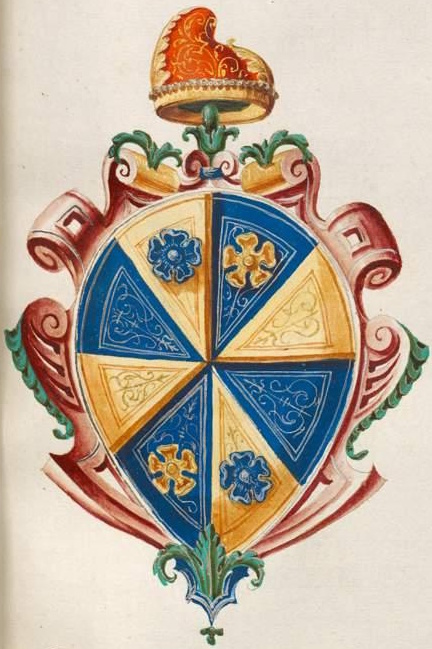
Attribuited arms of Pietro Tribuno

Little is known about Pietro Tribuno's early life before his election as doge. Contemporary documents refer to him simply as Petrus dux. The surname Tribuno (or Trundomenico) was first attributed to him by the chronicler John the Deacon, who identified him as the son of a tribune named Domenico and Agnella, a niece of doge Pietro Tradonico. Although a family known as Trundomenico is attested in Venetian records until the 12th century, its relationship to Pietro cannot be established with certainty. Some chronicles state that Pietro's family belonged to the same lineage as the House of Memmo.

Unlike many of his predecessors, who had come to power through the dominance of rival political factions, Pietro was the first doge to be elected by a formal assembly attended by the leading secular and ecclesiastical authorities, together with representatives of the population of Venice divided according to social rank.

=== Dogeship ===
Pietro was elected doge between late 887 and early 888, succeeding Giovanni II Participazio, who had briefly returned to power following the death of doge Pietro I Candiano in battle. He adopted a more conciliatory foreign policy than his predecessors, maintaining peaceful relations with Venice's neighbors. The chronicler John the Deacon later described his reign as "an era of peace and prosperity".

Relations with the Kingdom of Italy, which succeeded the now fractured Carolingian Empire, were strengthened through the renewal of the Pactum Lotharii, which had long regulated Venice's commercial and political relations with the West. On 7 May 888, King Berengar I confirmed the existing privileges while adding an annual payment of twenty-five Pavian pounds (livres), requested by the Venetians as formal recognition of their trading rights within the kingdom. On 20 June 891, his successor Guy III of Spoleto further clarified the legal procedures governing disputes over Venetian property and granted the doge the right to prosecute Venetian citizens who had fled across the frontier. The economic benefits were immediate and the 890s saw growth in Venice's relatively new iron industry. Meanwhile, land reclamation continued apace.

Venice also maintained good relations with the Byzantine Empire, to which the duchy formally remained subject. During the reign of emperor Leo VI the Wise, Pietro received the Byzantine court title of protospatharios. Relations with the Slavic peoples along the eastern Adriatic likewise remained peaceful, ending a period in which their raids had frequently disrupted Venetian commerce.

This stability was interrupted in 899, when the Magyars invaded northern Italy and devastated the Venetian mainland. After plundering several coastal settlements such as Cittanova, Chioggia, Equilium (Jesolo) and Altinum, they attempted to attack Venice itself but were repelled by a fleet of galleys assembled by Pietro, taking advantage of their inexperience in naval warfare and weak coracles. The Magyars were thus routed in the first great Venetian military victory since the defeat of Pepin of Italy almost a century prior. In the aftermath of the invasion, the doge convened a placitum in February 900 that confirmed privileges and granted exemptions to the Monastery of Santo Stefano of Altinum, which had suffered damage during the raids.

Pietro's reign also witnessed significant urban development in Venice. The city's defenses were strengthened through the construction of a wall extending from San Pietro di Castello beyond St. Mark's Basilica and by the installation of a chain across the Giudecca Canal to protect the entrance to the San Marco basin. According to John the Deacon, writing a century later, with the construction of this wall Venice truly became a civitas (city). Major civic works also began during Pietro's rule, including the construction of the St Mark's Campanile and the first permanent connections between the islands of the Rialto archipelago, laying the foundations for the later urban development of Venice. He also stretched a gigantic chain across the Grand Canal from San Gregorio on Dorsoduro.

Pietro died in c. 911 and was buried in the Church of San Zaccaria. Chroniclers differ regarding the circumstances of Pietro's death. Some state that he was deposed and killed by the people for his unjust and intolerant rule, while others maintain that he died of natural causes, respected and mourned by the Venetians. According to some traditions, the government was exercised for eight months after his death by his son Domenico, until the election of Pietro's successor Orso II Participazio. Almost nothing is known about Domenico's regency, apart from a single administrative act issued in favor of the inhabitants of Chioggia. Modern historians, however, generally regard the document as containing a copying or dating error, possibly in the doge's name, and reject the hypothesis of an otherwise unknown doge.

== Family ==
Pietro is known to have had two sons with his wife Angela Sanudo: Domenico, who became Patriarch of Grado, and Pietro, who may have predeceased his father. The latter's son, also named Pietro, was later elected Bishop of Olivolo.

== Legacy ==
Pietro Tribuno is depicted in the posthumous series of official portraits of the doges of Venice in the Doge's Palace. The original gallery was established in the 1360s under doge Marco Cornaro as a chronological sequence of Venetian rulers, each shown holding a scroll inscribed with a summary of his achievements. After the original paintings were destroyed in the fire of 1577, the series was recreated, with Domenico Tintoretto executing most of the surviving portraits. The scroll held by Pietro Tribuno contains the following inscription in latin:

AB INGENTIBVS UNDIQUE BELLIS PATRIAM INGENTI CLASSE TUTATUS SUM

["With a great fleet, I protected my homeland from great wars on every side.]

== Sources ==
- Norwich, John Julius (1982). A History of Venice. New York: Alfred A. Knopf.
- https://archive.org/stream/dogaressasofveni00stal#page/314/mode/2up

Political offices
Preceded by Giovanni II Participazio	Doge of Venice; 887/8–911	Succeeded by Orso II Participazio
