= Giovanni Participazio =

Giovanni Participazio may refer to:

- Giovanni I Participazio (died 837), tenth (historical) or twelfth (traditional) Doge of Venice
- Giovanni II Participazio (died 887), thirteenth (historical) or fifteenth (traditional) Doge of Venice
