= Battle of Sansego =

Battle of Sansego (842)
- Part of the Arab–Venetian wars
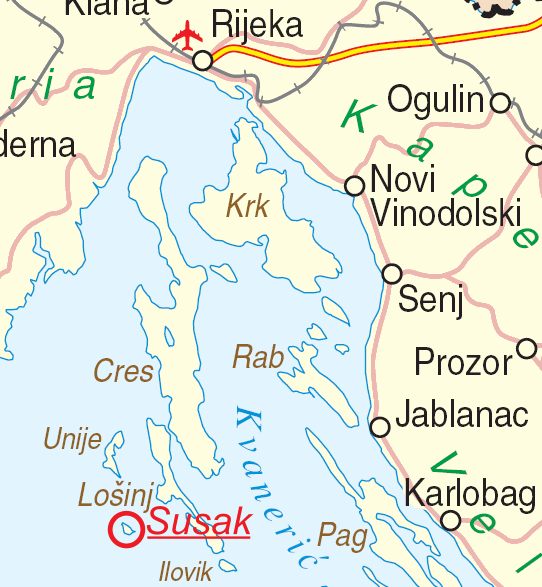
- Location of Sansego in Adriatic
| Date | 842 |
| Location | off Susak, Kvarner Gulf |
| Result | Aghlabid victory |

Belligerents
| Republic of Venice | Aghlabids |

Commanders and leaders
| Pietro Tradonico | Unknown |

Strength
| Unknown | Unknown |

Casualties and losses
| Heavy, several ships captured | Unknown |

The Battle of Sansego was a naval engagement between the Venetians and the Aghlabids off the island of Sansego. The Venetians suffered a crushing defeat.

== Background ==
In the year 840, during a civil war, Radelchis I of Benevento had asked the Aghlabids for help against Siconulf of Salerno. The Aghlabids agreed; however, Radelchis's decision proved to be too reckless, as the Aghlabids managed to capture the city of Bari. The Aghlabids used it as their base of corsair activities for the next thirty years. The Arab naval operations began disrupting shipping in the Adriatic. The Republic of Venice became aware of their activities and established an alliance with the Byzantine Empire. However, this alliance was defeated at Taranto in the same year. The Arabs then proceeded to continue further operations in the Adriatic.

== Battle ==
In 842, the Arab fleet appeared once again in the Adriatic. The Doge of Venice, Pietro Tradonico, dispatched a fleet to intercept the Arabs. The Venetians met them off the island of Sansego in the Kvarner Gulf. A fierce battle ensued, which ended in the defeat of the Venetian navy, with several of their ships captured while the rest fled the battle. After this victory, the Arabs did not remain in the area and retired back south.

== Aftermath ==
The Venetian defeat at Sansego encouraged the Narentine corsairs to cross the Adriatic, land, and sack the city of Caorle. Because of this, Venice was forced to build two large warships to guard their shipping against their enemies. The attacks on the Adriatic made the Venetians lose control of the sea, and their trade with Byzantium was becoming dangerous.

== Sources ==
- Kenneth Meyer Setton (2016), A History of the Crusades, Volume I, The First Hundred Years.
- Francis Cotterell Hodgson (1901), The Early History of Venice, From the Foundation to the Conquest of Constantinople, A.D. 1204.
- Alethea Wiel (1910), The Navy of Venice.
