= Siege of Lastovo =

Military engagement of the Croatian-Venetian wars in Medieval Europe

- Part of the Croatian-Venetian wars
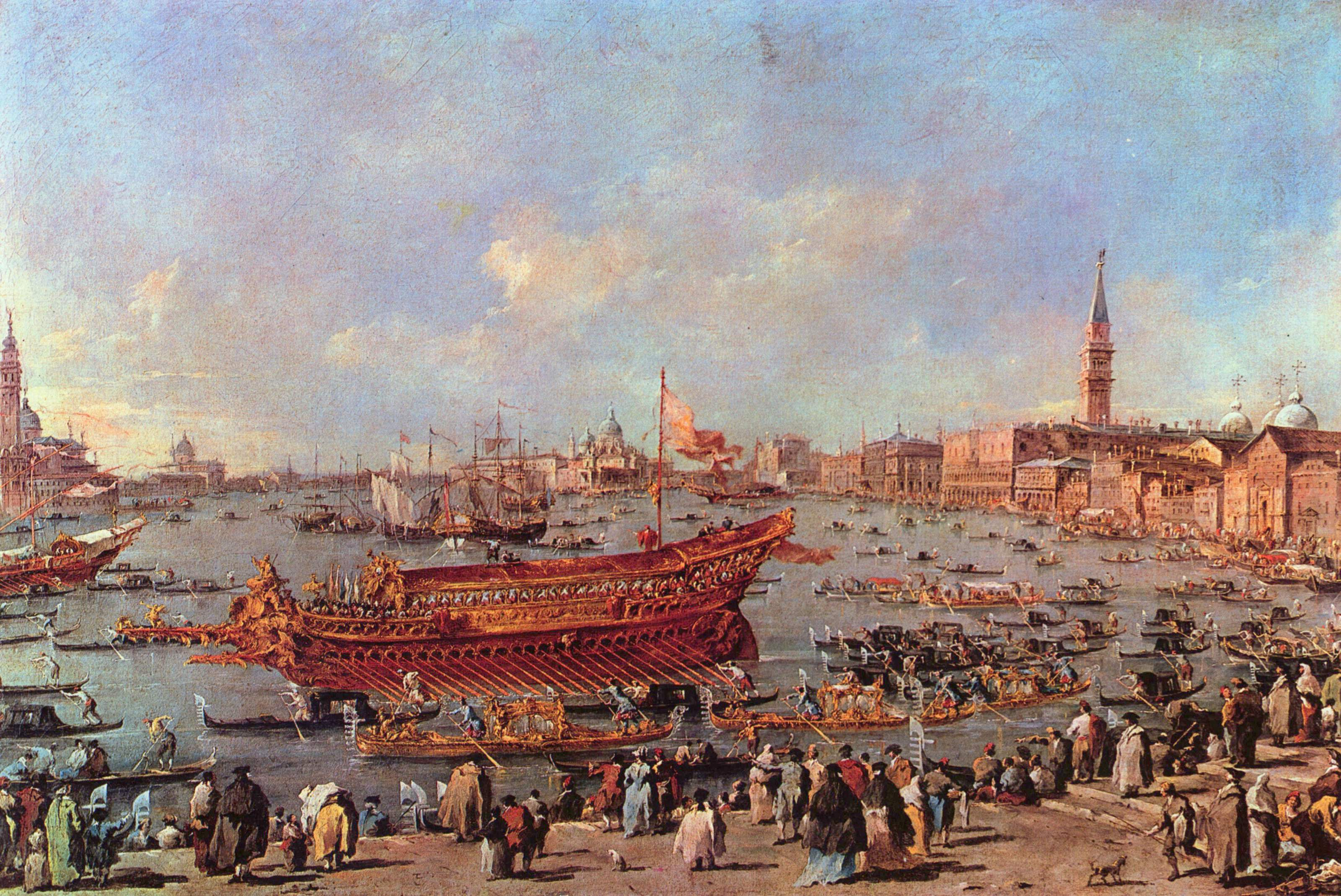
- The Bucintoro during the Ascension Day
Date	1000
Location	Lastovo, Theme of Dalmatia, ceded from Byzantine Empire to Kingdom of Croatia
Result	Venetian victory

Belligerents
Republic of Venice	Kingdom of Croatia; Narentines

Commanders and leaders
Doge Pietro II Orseolo	Unknown

Strength
Unknown	Unknown

Casualties and losses
Unknown	Unknown

The siege of Lastovo of 1000 was a naval blockade, battle, and siege during the Croatian-Venetian wars, fought between the medieval Kingdom of Croatia and the Republic of Venice. Essential details of the engagement, including numbers of casualties and the battle's exact dates, are unknown. It resulted in Venetian victory and annexation of the island of Lastovo.

== Background ==
After the death of Croatian King Stephen Držislav in 997, an ally of the Byzantine Empire, his eldest son and successor Svetoslav Suronja continued his father's pro-Byzantine policy. But Stephen Držislav's younger sons Krešimir and Gojslav rebelled. With the aid of Bulgarian emperor Samuil, Krešimir and Gojslav ousted their older brother in 1000 and forced him to seek refuge in Venice.

At the same time, Doge Pietro II Orseolo prepared his forces to take control over Dalmatian city-states and Narentine territories. Several of these maritime city-states had large culturally Italian populations, and many welcomed the Venetians. Other Croatian subjects—such as those on the island of Lastovo—fiercely resisted the Venetian incursion.

== Siege ==
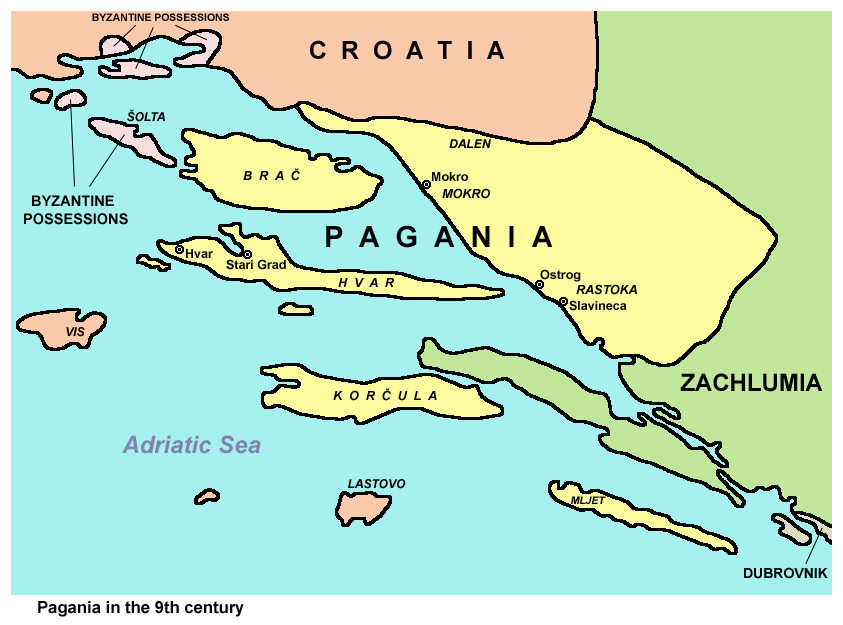
Before the siege, the island of Lastovo was part of the Theme of Dalmatia, ceded from the Byzantine Empire to the Kingdom of Croatia.

The exact dates of the siege of Lastovo are unknown. According to John the Deacon, Orseolo's medieval chronicler, the doge attended the Holy Mass on Ascension Day (9 May 1000) in Venice. Then he led his fleet towards Grado to visit the patriarch and on 11 May he sailed southwards.

As the fleet reached Lastovo, the residents of the town did not welcome it, but waited behind the city walls, ready to resist. Orseolo ordered them to surrender but they refused, so he started to attack the town. His troops besieged it, trying to break the town gate as well as to seize the towers of the wall. They succeeded in capturing the tower with the water cistern, which was a big setback for the remaining defenders. Finally, they were forced to surrender and to lay down their weapons. The doge spared their lives, but gave the order to his soldiers to destroy the defensive walls and to burn down the town. The citizens were moved away to the other side of the island, where they built a new settlement.

== Aftermath ==
Pietro II Orseolo subjected Lastovo to Venetian authority. He next directed his fleet to Dubrovnik, was there shown obeisance and then, satisfied, returned to Venice. He gave himself the title Dux Dalmatianorum (Duke of the Dalmatians), initiating the maritime empire known to the Venetians as the Stato da Màr.

The island of Lastovo remained a Venetian possession until the reign of King Stephen I of Croatia (ruled 1030–1058) and his successors. In 1252 the citizenry of Lastovo joined the Community of Dubrovnik (ital. Ragusa), later known as the Republic of Ragusa.

== See also ==
- Timeline of Croatian history
- Timeline of the Republic of Venice
- Croatian-Venetian wars
- Siege of Zadar (998)
- Military history of Croatia
- Military history of the Republic of Venice
