= Franciscan Province of Dalmatia =

Croatian province of the Order of Friars Minor

Coordinates: 44.1167°N 15.2216°E

The Franciscan Province of St. Jerome (Croatian: Franjevačka provincija Svetog Jeronima) is a Croatian province of the Order of Friars Minor which is based in Zadar and active in Istria and Dalmatia.

The province was founded in the Croatian lands in the Middle Ages, and its original seal dates from 1393. Notable members have included Nicholas Tavelic and Sebastijan Slade.

In 1925, they sent a friar to the United States to aid the Croatian immigrant community, and he was stationed at Millvale, Pennsylvania at the St. Nicholas Croatian Church; later another friar was sent to McKeesport, Pennsylvania. In 1951, they purchased a property in Washington, D.C., and Ivan Meštrović donated the St. Jerome the Priest monument for the occasion.

They run 24 monasteries, including the Monastery of St. Francis of Assisi in Zadar and that of Our Lady of Angels near Orebić.

== Conventuals ==
There are two eponymous but separate Provinces of the Order of Conventual Franciscans and of the friars of the Third Order Regular of St. Francis of Penance in the same territory.
