= Battle of Taranto (840) =

840 battle of the Arab–Byzantine wars

- Part of the Arab–Byzantine wars
- Map of the Arab–Byzantine naval conflict in the Mediterranean, 7th–11th centuries
| Date | Spring 840 |
| Location | off Taranto, Apulia |
| Result | Aghlabid victory |

Belligerents
| Byzantine Empire; Republic of Venice | Aghlabids |

Commanders and leaders
| Giovanni Tradonico | Unknown |

Strength
| 12,000 men 60 ships | Unknown |

Casualties and losses
| Entire force annihilated | Unknown |

The Battle of Taranto was a naval engagement between an Arab Aghlabid fleet and a combined Byzantine-Venetian navy. The battle ended in a crushing defeat for the Byzantine-Venetian fleet.

== Background ==
The Muslim conquest of Sicily began in 827, led by the Aghlabid dynasty. The Aghlabids captured Palermo in 831 and Messina in 843. The capture of Messina gave the Muslims control of its crucial straits and opened a road to incursions in southern Italy which in fact began before the fall of the city. Brindisi fell in 838, and Taranto in 839. The Byzantines had neglected their bases in the eastern Adriatic. In the year 840, a Byzantine delegation led by Theodosius Babutzicius went to Venice asking for help against Muslim incursions. The Doge of Venice, Pietro Tradonico, agreed to help since he saw the threat of the Saracens as more dangerous than Slavic corsairs.

== Battle ==
In the spring of 840, the Doge had dispatched a fleet led by the Doge's son, Giovanni, to meet with the Byzantine squadron. Together, the combined fleet's main goal was to recapture Taranto, lost earlier to the Muslims. The combined armada had 60 ships with 200 men on each ship. They moved southward until they arrived near Taranto, where the Arab fleet met them. According to Venetian sources, the Byzantine admiral had fled after the first engagement. Whatever the reason may be, the combined fleet suffered destruction, and its land forces, which disembarked near the city, were wiped out.

== Aftermath ==
The victory at Taranto prompted the Aghlabids to launch raids into the Adriatic. The next year, they plundered the island of Cres in Dalmatia. The Arabs also managed to capture and sack the city of Ancona. On their return voyage, they managed to capture several Venetian ships on their way home.

== See also ==
- Battle of Sansego

== Sources ==
- Alethea Wiel (1910), The Navy of Venice.
- Donald M. Nicol (1992), Byzantium and Venice, A Study in Diplomatic and Cultural Relations.
- John Julius Norwich (2003), A History of Venice.
- David Abulafia (2003), The Mediterranean in History.
- T. Venning & J. Harris (2006), A Chronology of the Byzantine Empire.
