= Orso I Participazio =

Doge of Venice from 864 to 881

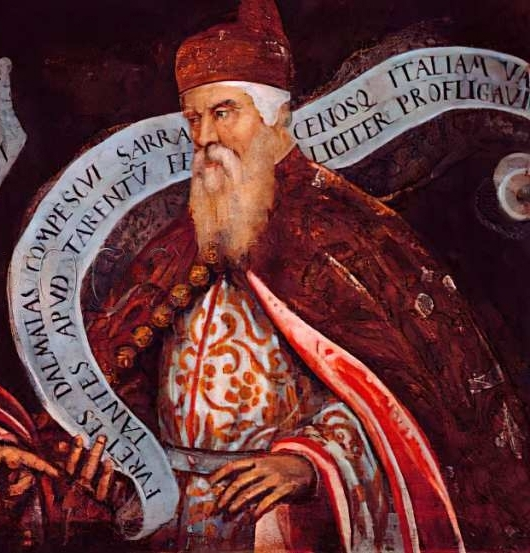
- Portrait in the Doge’s Palace

Doge of Venice
- Reign: 864–881
- Predecessor: Pietro Tradonico
- Successor: Giovanni II Participazio
- Co-doges: Giovanni II Participazio (Before 880–881)
- Born: Unknown; Venice
- Died: 881; Venice
- Burial: Church of San Zaccaria
- Issue Detail: Giovanni II Participazio; Pietro Participazio; Orso Participazio; Badoer Participazio; Felicia Participazio; Giovanna Participazio; Vittore II, Patriarch of Grado
- House: Participazio
- Father: Giovanni Participazio (?)

Orso I Participazio (died 881) was the Doge of Venice from 864 until his death 881. The surname Participazio (Particiaco) is a later historiographical attribution, retrospectively applied to several groups of early Venetian rulers.

During his reign, Orso strengthened Venice's position in the Adriatic through campaigns against Slavic and Saracen raiders, expanded Venetian control over the lagoon through land reclamation and urban development, and increased ducal influence over the Church of Venice. He was succeeded by his son and co-doge, Giovanni II Participazio.

== Biography ==
=== Early life ===
Little is known about Orso I's early life. The surname Participazio is a later historiographical attribution. It first appears in John the Deacon's chronicle, written around 1008, where it is applied only to doge Orso II. Since then, however, historians have conventionally extended the name to three successive groups of Venetian rulers: the first comprising Agnello I, Giustiniano, and Giovanni I (810–836); the second consisting of Orso I and Giovanni II (864–887); and the third including Orso II and his son Pietro (911–942). Although these rulers are traditionally treated as a single dynasty, modern historians generally regard them as three distinct dynastic groups, as the evidence for close kinship between them is inconclusive.

According to a tradition first attested in the 13th century, Orso I's father, Ioannaceno (Giovanni), was the son of the co-doge Agnello II, who died in Constantinople during the reign of his father (or grandfather), doge Agnello I. If true, this would make Orso I the founder of the dynasty's second branch. Modern historians, however, consider this genealogy unproven and believe it more likely that the line descended from Agnello I became extinct without direct heirs. Likewise, the later tradition that doge Orso II descended from Orso I through a son named Badoer would, if correct, make Orso II the founder of a third branch, but this relationship is also regarded as uncertain. Nevertheless, the surname Participazio has become firmly established in modern historiography.

Orso may have been the older brother of Vitale I, Patriarch of Grado (856 - 874).

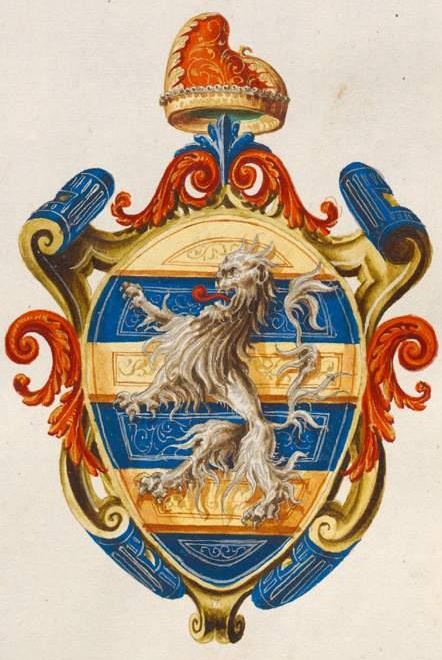
Coat of Arms of the House of Participazio

=== Dogeship ===
Orso was elected doge, probably by acclamation, shortly after the assassination of his predecessor, Pietro Tradonico, on 13 September 864. Although there is no evidence that he was involved in the conspiracy, he punished those responsible by executing some and exiling others to both the Byzantine and Carolingian empires.

Like his predecessor, Orso devoted much of his reign to combating piracy in the Adriatic. Around 866, he launched an expedition against the Croatian duke Domagoj, who agreed to a truce and surrendered hostages rather than fight. The peace proved temporary: around 872 the Venetians suffered a setback near Savudrija on the western coast of Istria, and in 876 Domagoj's son attacked several Istrian towns before advancing towards Grado. Orso responded by defeating the Slavic fleet in a naval engagement. Two years later he concluded an agreement with the restored Croatian ruler Zdeslav, who guaranteed the safety of Venetian shipping in return for an annual tribute, although the Narentine pirates remained outside the treaty and continued their attacks.

The Saracens also remained a persistent threat throughout Orso's reign. Between 867 and 871, perhaps in coordination with the campaigns of Emperor Louis II in southern Italy, Venetian ships successfully attacked the Saracen stronghold at Taranto. In 872, however, Muslim raiders sailing from Crete entered the Adriatic and attacked settlements along the Dalmatian coast. The greatest danger came in 875, when a Saracen fleet threatened Grado. Orso dispatched a fleet under the command of his son Giovanni, who diverted the attackers towards Comacchio, causing the rival city to be sacked instead of Grado. These campaigns, coordinated at least in part with Carolingian and Byzantine operations, enhanced Venice's prestige abroad. Around 878, Orso received the Byzantine court title of protospatharios, the first Venetian doge to be granted the distinction.

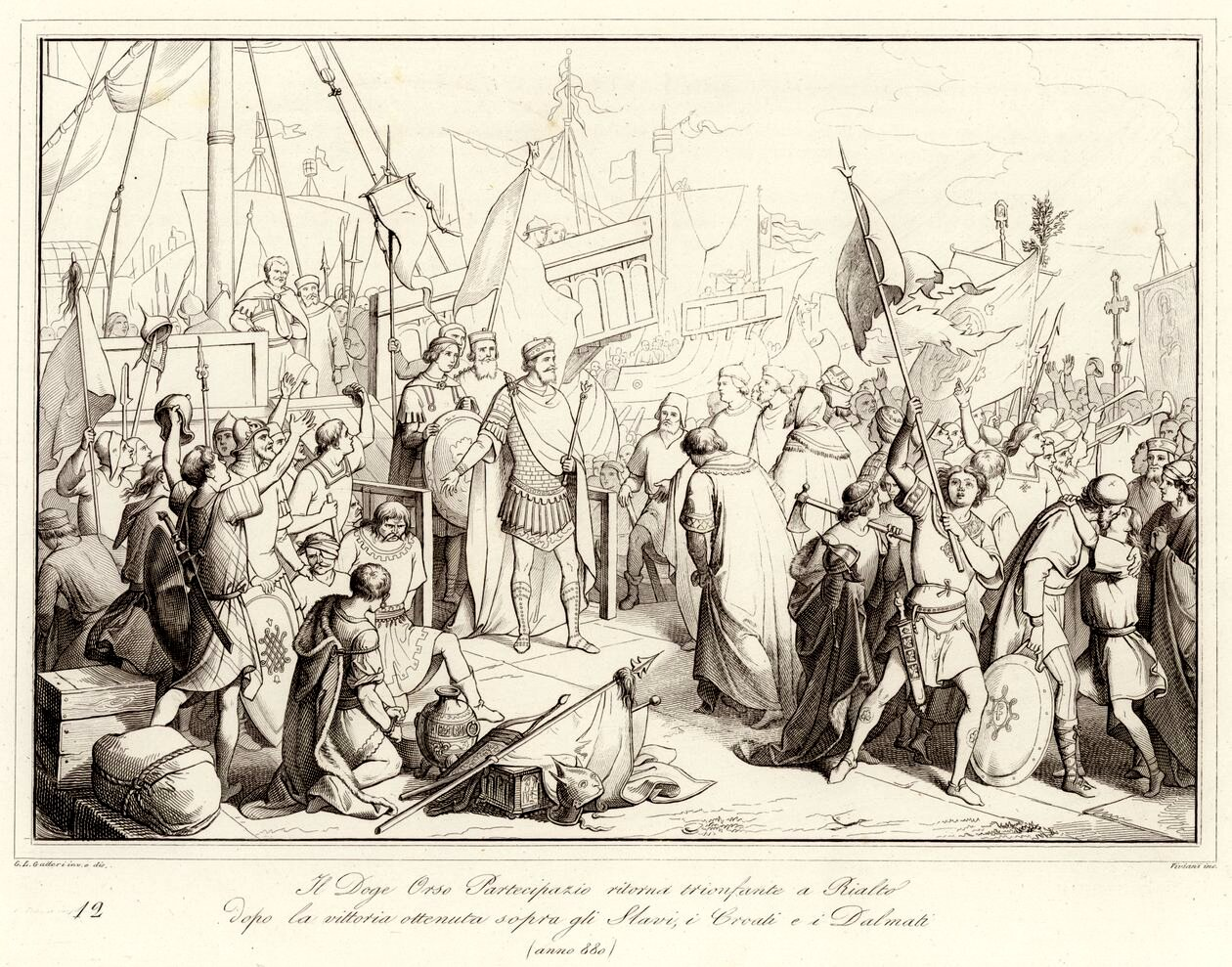
Orso returns in triumph from his victory against the Slavic pirates, drawing by Giuseppe Lorenzo Gatteri

Orso promoted the expansion of Venice through the reclamation of marshland and the construction of new buildings in the eastern part of Rialto and the present-day sestiere of Dorsoduro. In 880, together with his son and co-doge Giovanni, he renewed the prohibition on the Venetian slave trade. Although unpopular among merchants because it restricted a profitable trade, the measure improved Venice's international standing.

Orso pursued an active ecclesiastical policy aimed at strengthening ducal influence over the Venetian Church. During his reign the six dioceses that would later form the ecclesiastical province of Grado (Caorle, Eraclea, Equilium (Jesolo), Malamocco, Olivolo, and Torcello) are all first attested. His attempts to control episcopal appointments brought him into conflict with Pietro I Marturio, Patriarch of Grado, who initially refused office, later opposed Orso's nominees, and even excommunicated the doge. Despite repeated interventions by Pope John VIII, Orso prevailed, forcing the patriarch to recognize the bishops he had appointed. His policies marked an important step towards the subordination of the patriarchal church to ducal authority.

As part of this policy, in January 880 Orso concluded a treaty in Venice with Walpert, Patriarch of Aquileia. The agreement ended the long-standing conflict between Aquileia and Grado, exempted Venetian merchants using it from taxation, and secured Aquileia's renunciation of its claims over the churches and possessions of the Patriarchate of Grado.

Orso also maintained friendly relations with the Carolingian Empire. In 880 he attended the Imperial Diet of Ravenna, where emperor Charles the Fat renewed the Pactum Lotharii, a treaty originally concluded between Lothair I and Pietro Tradonico confirming the commercial privileges and peaceful relations between Venice and the empire.

Orso died in 881 and was buried in the Church of San Zaccaria. His eldest son and co-doge, Giovanni II Participazio, succeeded him as sole doge.

== Family ==
Orso I Participazio had at least six children (four sons and two daughters) with his wife, including:

- Giovanni II Participazio, who was associated with his father as co-doge sometime before 880 and later succeeded him as doge.
- Pietro Participazio, who briefly served as co-doge under his brother Giovanni II.
- Orso Participazio, who briefly served as co-doge under his brother Giovanni II. He refused the prospect of succeeding him as sole doge after his eventual abdication in 887.
- Badoer Participazio (Also spelled Badoario), who died after being captured during an expedition against Comacchio; He is said to be the father of doge Orso II Participazio.
- Felicia Participazio, who married Rodoald, son of John, Duke of Bologna.
- Giovanna Participazio, who became abbess of the Monastery of San Zaccaria.

It is possible that Orso I Participazio may have also been the father of Vittore II, Patriarch of Grado (877/8 - ?).

== Legacy ==
Orso I Participazio is depicted in the posthumous series of official portraits of the doges of Venice in the Doge's Palace. The original gallery was established in the 1360s under doge Marco Cornaro as a chronological sequence of Venetian rulers, each shown holding a scroll inscribed with a summary of his achievements. After the original paintings were destroyed in the fire of 1577, the series was recreated, with Domenico Tintoretto executing most of the surviving portraits. The scroll held by Orso I Participazio contains the following inscription in latin:

FURENTES DALMATAS COMPESCUI SARACENOSQVE ITALIAM VASTANTES APUD TARENTUM FELICITER PROFLIGAVI

[I subdued the warlike Dalmatians and, near Taranto, successfully defeated the Saracens who were ravaging Italy.]

== Sources ==
- Norwich, John Julius. A History of Venice. Alfred A. Knopf: New York, 1982.

Political offices
Preceded by Pietro Tradonico	Doge of Venice; 864–881	Succeeded by Giovanni II Participazio
