= Giovanni II Participazio =

Doge of Venice from 881 to 887

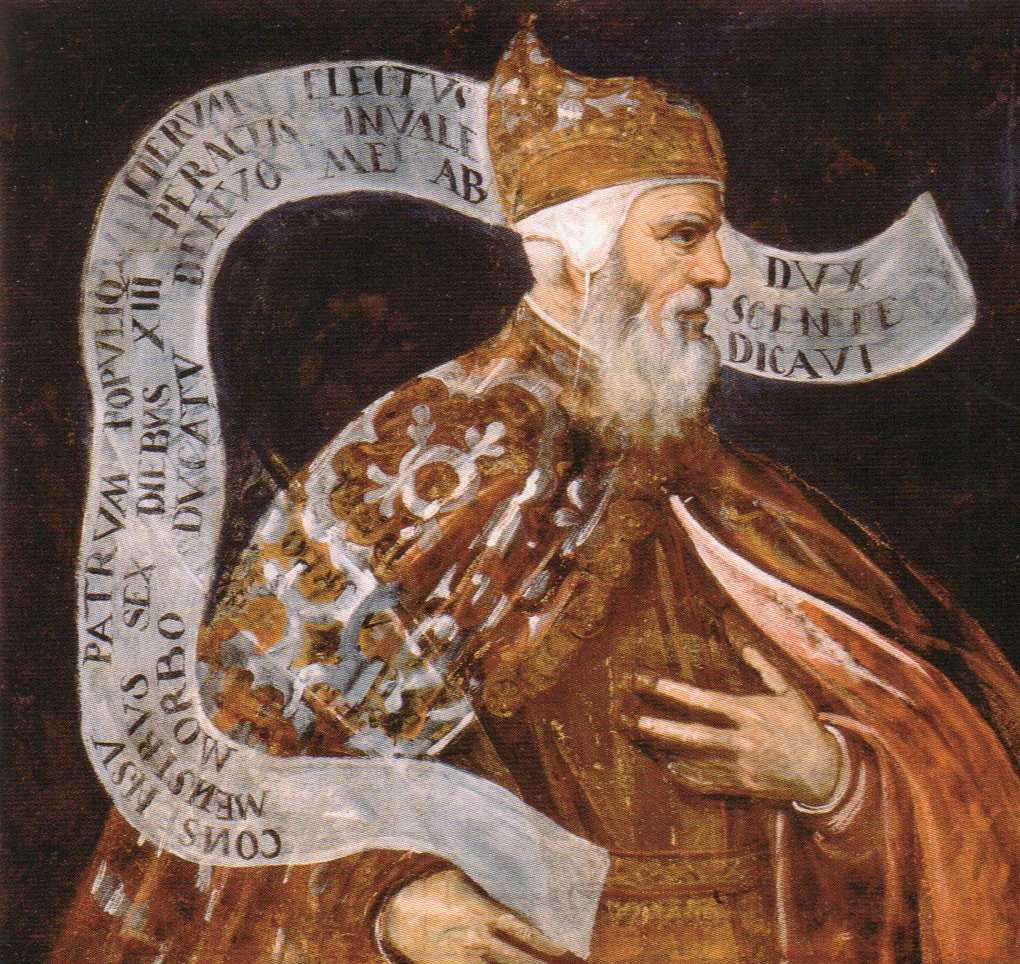
- Portrait in the Doge’s Palace (2nd reign)

Doge of Venice (1st reign)
- Reign: 881 – 17 April 887
- Predecessor: Orso I Participazio
- Successor: Pietro I Candiano
- Co-doges: Pietro Participazio (?–?); Orso Participazio (?–17 April 887)

Doge of Venice (2nd reign)
- Reign: 887–887/8
- Predecessor: Pietro I Candiano
- Successor: Pietro Tribuno

Co-doge of Venice
- Reign: Before 880–881
- Senior doge: Orso I Participazio
- Born: Unknown; Venice
- Died: After 887/8; Venice
- Burial: Unknown
- House: Participazio
- Father: Orso I Participazio

Giovanni II Participazio (died after 887/8) was the Doge of Venice, ruling from 881 to 17 April 887, with a brief return to office in late 887. The surname Participazio (Particiaco) is a later historiographical attribution, retrospectively applied to several groups of early Venetian rulers.

The eldest son of doge Orso I Participazio, he had served as co-doge alongside his father before succeeding him. During his reign, Giovanni continued Venice's military and commercial policies in the Adriatic, renewed Venetian privileges with the Carolingian Empire, and attempted to strengthen his family's political influence within the Venetian government. His efforts to expand Venetian authority over Comacchio ended unsuccessfully, and his final years were marked by illness and political instability.

== Biography ==
=== Early life ===
Giovanni II Participazio was the eldest son of doge Orso I Participazio. The surname Participazio is a later historiographical attribution. It first appears in John the Deacon's chronicle, written around 1008, where it is applied only to doge Orso II. Since then, however, historians have conventionally extended the name to three successive groups of Venetian rulers: the first comprising Agnello I, Giustiniano, and Giovanni I (810–836); the second consisting of Orso I and Giovanni II (864–887); and the third including Orso II and his son Pietro (911–942). Although these rulers are traditionally treated as a single dynasty, modern historians generally regard them as three distinct dynastic groups, as the evidence for close kinship between them is inconclusive.

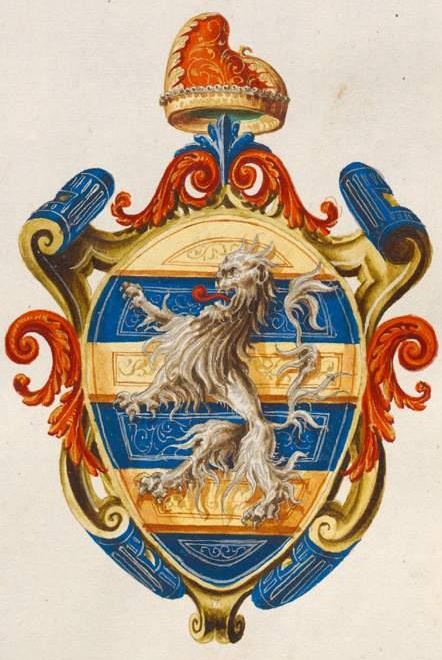
Coat of Arms of the House of Participazio

During his father's reign, Giovanni played an active role in Venice's military campaigns against Saracen raiders. Between 867 and 871, Venetian ships successfully attacked the Saracen stronghold at Taranto, likely in coordination with the campaigns of Emperor Louis II in southern Italy. In 875, when Saracen pirates launched a raid against the Venetian city of Grado, Giovanni commanded the Venetian fleet that successfully diverted the attackers toward Comacchio, causing the rival city to be sacked instead of Grado.

Together with his father, Giovanni issued a decree in 880 prohibiting the Venetian slave trade. During this period, the republic also experienced favorable economic and demographic conditions, which, together with ducal initiatives, encouraged urban expansion through the reclamation and development of the eastern part of Rialto and Dorsoduro. Sometime before 880, while his father was still alive, he was appointed co-doge by Orso.

=== Dogeship ===
Upon Orso's death in 881, Giovanni automatically succeeded him as sole doge.

Giovanni continued the domestic and foreign policies of his father. In 883, he secured from Emperor Charles the Fat the renewal of the commercial treaty previously granted to Venice, confirming earlier privileges dating back to the Pactum Lotharii. His reign also coincided with an important transformation of the Venetian political system, as the traditional tribunes gradually disappeared from public life and were replaced by judges as the leading officials of the ducal administration.

Seeking to strengthen dynastic rule, Giovanni associated several members of his family with the government. He appointed his brother Pietro as co-doge, while he also attempted to secure political offices for his family elsewhere. In particular, he sought to obtain control of Comacchio for his youngest brother Badoer (Also spelled Badoario). Badoer was sent to negotiate with the pope, but was captured by Marinus, Count of Comacchio, and returned to Venice, where he died soon afterwards. In retaliation, Giovanni captured and devastated Comacchio, but was unable to retain it because the town remained under papal authority. Subsequent attempts to obtain papal recognition of the conquest proved unsuccessful, and Venice eventually abandoned the occupation.

In the final years of his reign, Giovanni's health deteriorated significantly. Following the death of his brother and co-doge Pietro, Giovanni nominated his surviving brother Orso as co-doge. When Orso refused the prospect of succeeding as sole doge after Giovanni's abdication, the Venetian assembly elected Pietro I Candiano as the new doge. Giovanni approved the election by associating Candiano as senior doge and designated successor, while formally retaining his own title. When Candiano was killed only a few months later in battle, Giovanni was recalled to office, but, still weakened by illness, he quickly resigned again, either in late 887 or early 888, thus allowing the Venetians to elect a new doge, Pietro Tribuno. He then retired from public life and probably died shortly afterwards. His burial place is unknown.

== Legacy ==
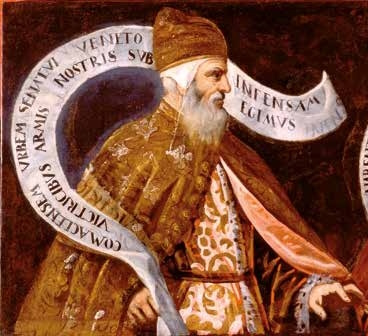
Portrait in the Doge's Palace (1st reign)

Giovanni II Participazio is depicted twice in the posthumous series of official portraits of the doges of Venice in the Doge's Palace, reflecting his two separate periods of rule: his first dogeship from 881 to 887 and his brief restoration in 887–888. The original gallery was established in the 1360s under doge Marco Cornaro as a chronological sequence of Venetian rulers, each represented holding a scroll inscribed with a summary of his achievements. After the original paintings were destroyed in the fire of 1577, the series was recreated, with Domenico Tintoretto executing most of the surviving portraits.

The scroll held in the first portrait of Giovanni II Participazio contains the following inscription in latin:

COMACLENSEM URBEM SENATUI VENETO INFENSAM VICTRICIBUS ARMIS / NOSTRIS SUBEGIMUS

[We subdued the city of Comacchio, hostile to the Venetian Senate, with our victorious arms.]

While the scroll held in the second portrait of Giovanni II Participazio contains the following inscription in latin:

CONSENSU PATRUM POPULIQUE ITERUM ELECTUS DUX MENSIBUS SEX DIEBUS TRESDECIM PERACTIS, INVALESCENTE MORBO, DUCATU DENUO ME ABDICAVI

[With the consent of the senators and the people, I was elected doge again; after six months and thirteen days had passed, as my illness worsened, I once again renounced the dogate.]

== See also ==
- List of doges of Venice
- Orso I Participazio

== Notes ==
1. Samuele Romanin, Storia documentata di Venezia, Pietro Naratovich tipografo editore, Venezia, 1853
2. PARTICIACO, Orso I - Dizionario Biografico degli Italiani - Volume 81 (2014)
3. Conoscere Venezia - Giovanni II Partecipazio. Doge XV. Anni 881-887
4. Da Mosto, Andrea. I dogi di Venezia con particolare riguardo alle loro tombe. Ferdinando Ongania.
5. Pedrocco, Sebastiano; Pedrocco, Paolo. i DOGI nei ritratti parlanti di Palazzo Ducale a Venezia.
6. "TRIBUNO, Pietro - Dizionario Biografico degli Italiani - Volume 96 (2019)".
7. Conoscere Venezia - Giovanni II Partecipazio. Doge XVI bis. Anni 887-888

== Sources ==
- Norwich, John Julius. A History of Venice. Alfred A. Knopf: New York, 1982.

Political offices
Preceded by Orso I Participazio	Doge of Venice; 881–887	Succeeded by Pietro I Candiano
Preceded by Pietro I Candiano	Doge of Venice; 887–887	Succeeded by Pietro Tribuno
