= Treaty of Zadar =

1358 treaty between Venice and Hungary

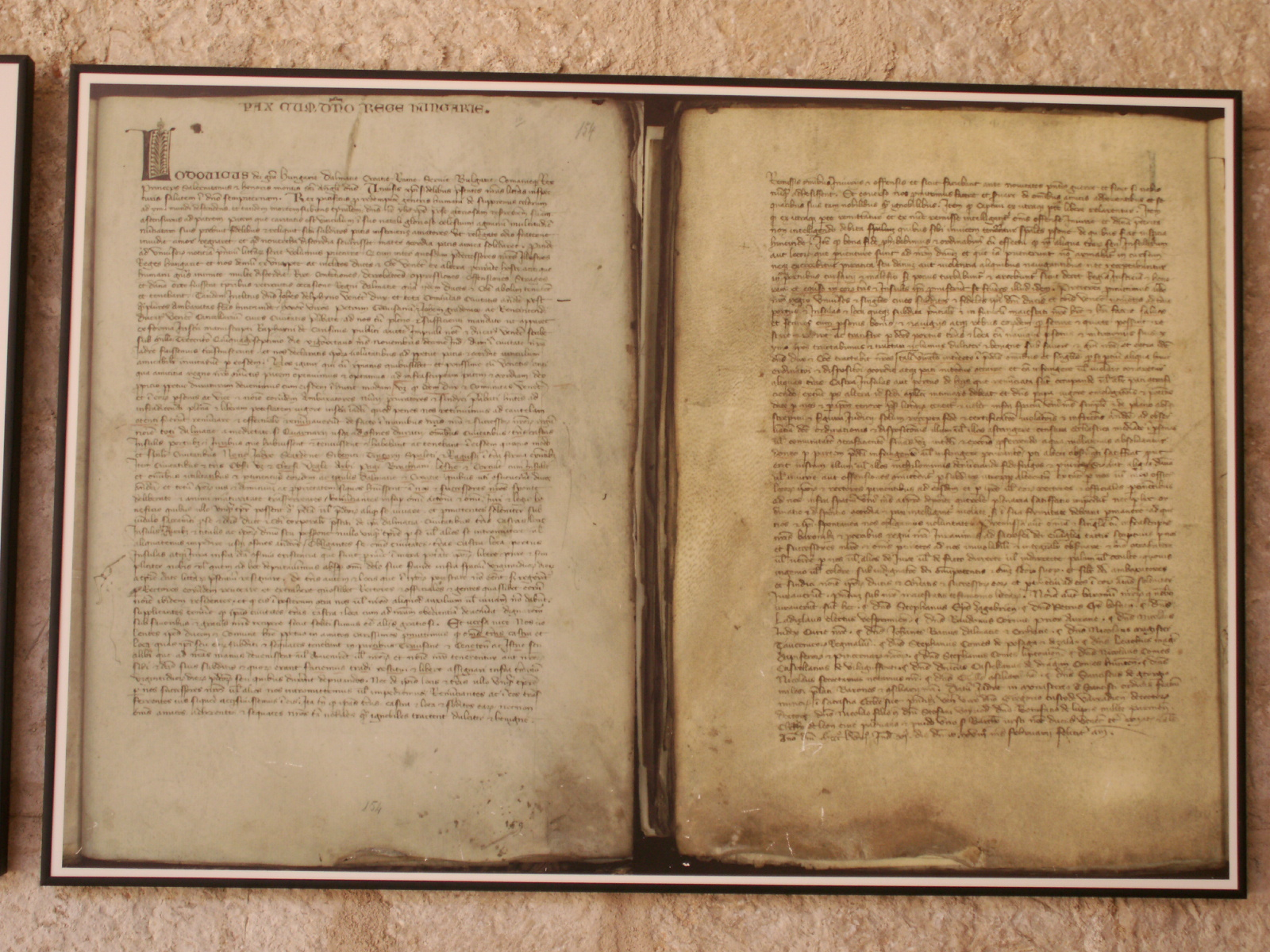
Copy of the Treaty of Zadar on the wall of St. Francis Church.

The Treaty of Zadar, also known as the Treaty of Zara, was a peace treaty signed in Zadar, Dalmatia on February 18, 1358. Under the treaty, the Venetian Republic lost influence over its Dalmatian holdings in exchange for ending hostilities with Louis I of Hungary. Both had been contesting control of a series of territories along the eastern Adriatic coastline in what is now Croatia.

== Background ==
In 1301, the Árpád dynasty was dissolved. After a brief interlude, it was replaced by the Angevin dynasty as the rulers of Hungary and Croatia. The first Angevin king was Charles Robert, who ruled from 1312 to 1342. He was supported by the most powerful Croatian nobleman, Pavao Šubić, Prince of Bribir and Ban (viceroy) of Croatia, ruler of the coastal cities of Split, Trogir, and Šibenik. Pavao became the Ban of Croatia, conferring on him many of the powers of a monarch including minting coinage, conferring charters on cities and levying annual taxes on them.

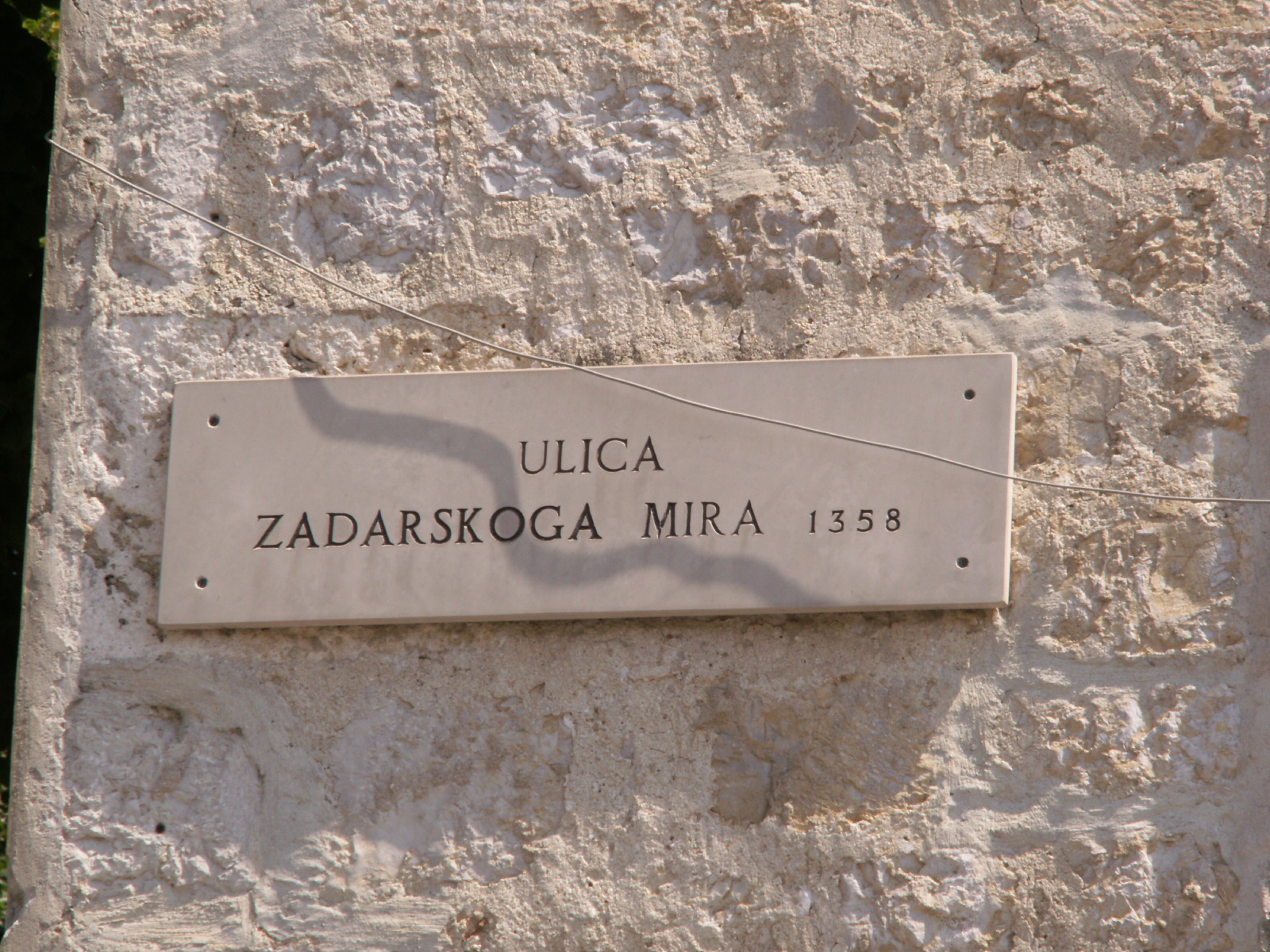
Peace of Zadar 1358 Street.

Pavao's actions led to a revolt among the Croatian nobility, who successfully reached out to King Charles to help them remove him. In exchange for his aide, however, the Croatian nobility was forced to declare their direct allegiance to the Hungarian monarchy, which set the stage for Hungarian attempts to expel the Venetian Republic from the Dalmatian coastline. The other cities in the Dalmatian region were suffering from tug of war between the Venetians and the Hungarians and Croatians, but Ragusa, which was held by Venice, was growing into an economic power house by exploiting its position between the west and the mineral-rich Kingdoms of Serbia and Bosnia and its broader location between Europe and the Levant.

== War ==
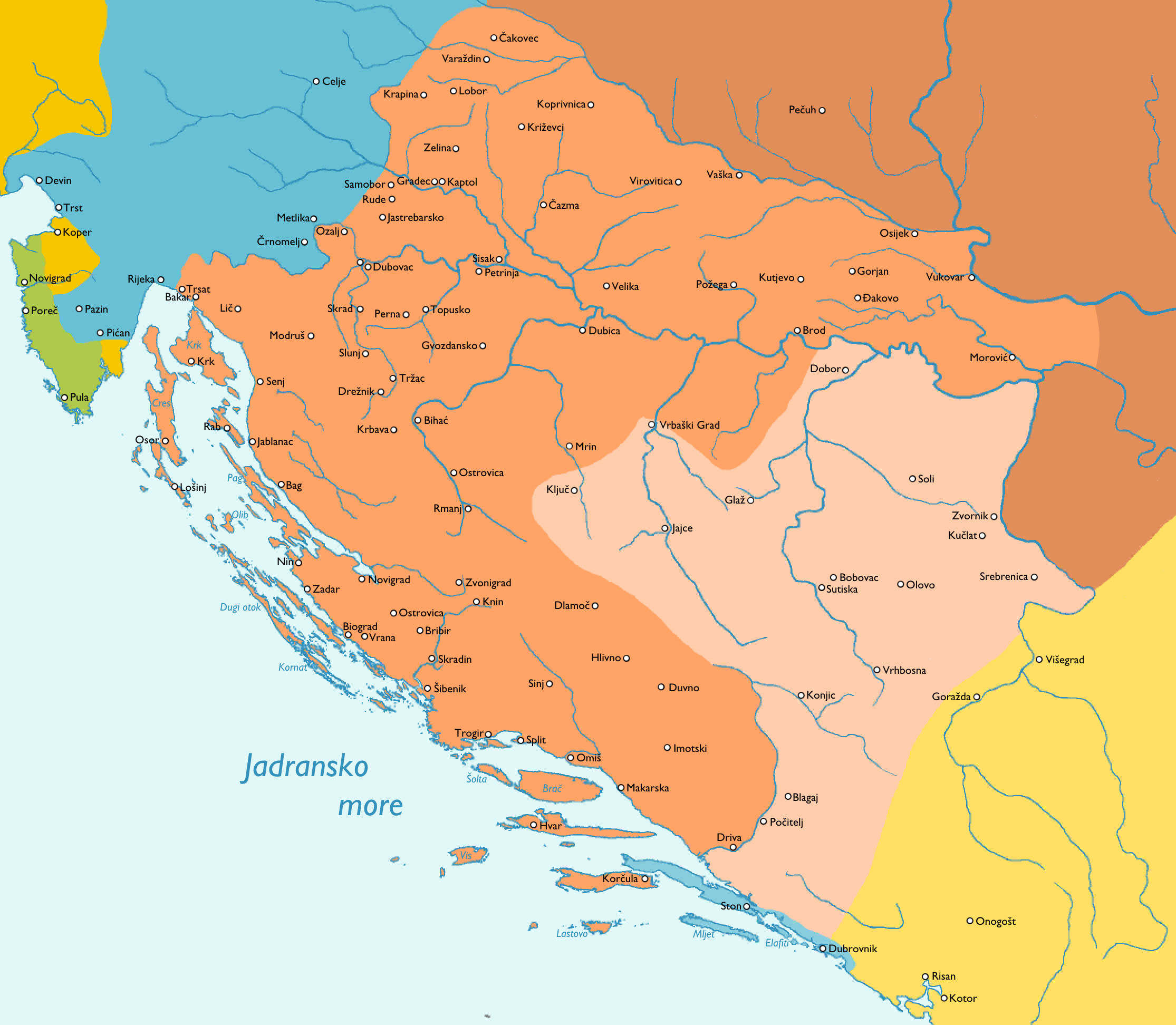
Zadar Treaty Kingdom of Hungary Kingdom of Croatia Banate of Bosnia Habsburg lands Patriarchate of Aquileia Venetian Republic Republic of Ragusa Serbian Empire

In the 1350s, Louis I was able to assemble a force of 50,000 men by joining his forces with reinforcements sent by the Duke of Austria, the Counts of Gorizia, the Lord of Padua, Francesco I da Carrara and the Patriarchate of Aquileia (a state of the Holy Roman Empire). In 1356, the coalition besieged the Venetians at Asolo, Conegliano, Ceneda and the stronghold of Treviso. At the same time, along the Dalmatian coast, the army had attacked the cities of Zadar (Zara), Trogir (Traù), Split (Spalato) Ragusa and other smaller towns that surrendered fairly quickly.

Broken by a series of military reversals suffered in the territory under their control, the Venetians resigned themselves to the unfavourable conditions stipulated in the Treaty of Zadar (Zara), which was signed in the eponymous city on February 18, 1358.

== Consequences ==
The treaty was signed in the Closter of Monastery of St. Francis. Based on the terms of the agreement, the Dubrovnik region and Zadar came under the rule of the King of Hungary and Croatia. It marked the rise of the Republic of Ragusa as an independent and successful state. The same cannot be said for Zadar since it was later sold back to Venice by Ladislaus of Naples.

As a result of the treaty, Venice had to give all its possessions in Dalmatia to the King, from the Kvarner to the Bay of Kotor, but could keep the Istrian coast and the Treviso region. It was also forced to cancel, in the title of its doge, any reference to Dalmatia. However, the treaty preserved Venice's naval predominance in the Adriatic Sea, as Louis accepted not to build a fleet of his own.

Louis and his army triumphantly entered Zadar in 1358 by granting extensive privileges to the nobility of Zadar and erecting the capital city of Dalmatia.

== See also ==
- List of treaties
