= Monastery of St. Francis Assisi (Zadar) =

Church in Zadar, Croatia

Monastery of St Francis of Assisi in Zadar
- Samostan sv. Franje Asiškog
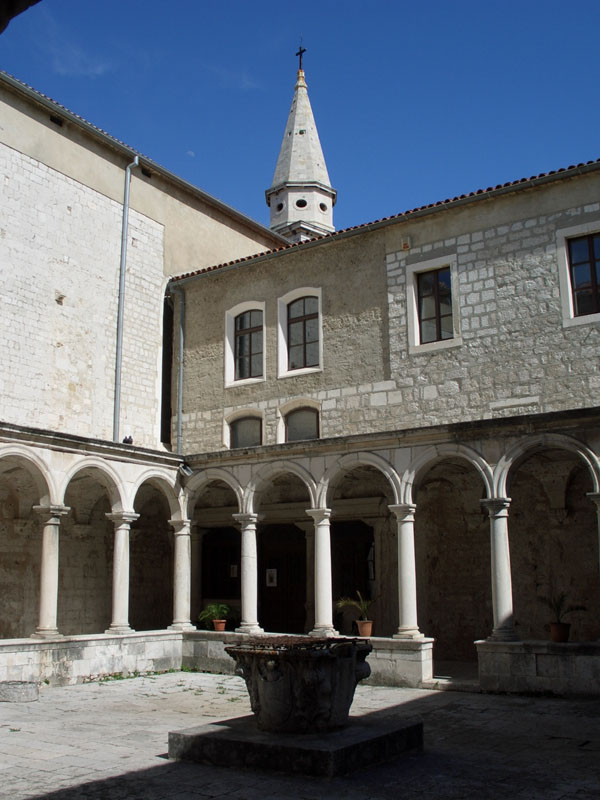

Monastery information
- Order: Franciscan
- Established: c.1221
- Dedication: Francis of Assisi
- Consecrated: c.1282

Architecture
- Status: Active
- Heritage designation: Register of Cultural Goods of Croatia
- Style: Gothic, Renaissance, and Gothic Revival
- Groundbreaking: c.1221

Site
- Location: Zadar
- Country: Croatia

The Monastery of St. Francis Assisi (Croatian: Samostan sv. Franje Asiškog) in Zadar is a Roman Catholic Franciscan monastery dating back to the 13th century. The monastery is held by the Franciscan Province of Saint Jerome.

The monastery, along with a church of the same name, was built around 1221. It was consecrated on October 12, 1282 by bishop Lovro Periandar. Throughout the centuries of its history the monastery was the focal point of religious life in the city of Zadar. It was also home to the Franciscan school, precursor to today's University of Zadar. It had rich picture gallery as well as a collection of codices and parchments. In this monastery Saint Jakov Varingez (Giacomo of Bitetto) was first ordained.

The church and monastery lie in the western part of the city. The church is the oldest Gothic church in Dalmatia. Behind the main altar dating from 1672 lies what was once a chapel and inside choir seats richly decorated with fretwork in Gothic style from 1394 by Giacomo da Borgo Sansepolcro.

The sacristy, which follows from the choir area, is important in Croatian history, because in 1358 the Venetian Republic and the Hungarian-Croatian king Louis I signed the Treaty of Zadar in which the Venetians gave up their Dalmatian holdings.
