= Battle of Makarska =

- Part of the Croatian–Venetian wars
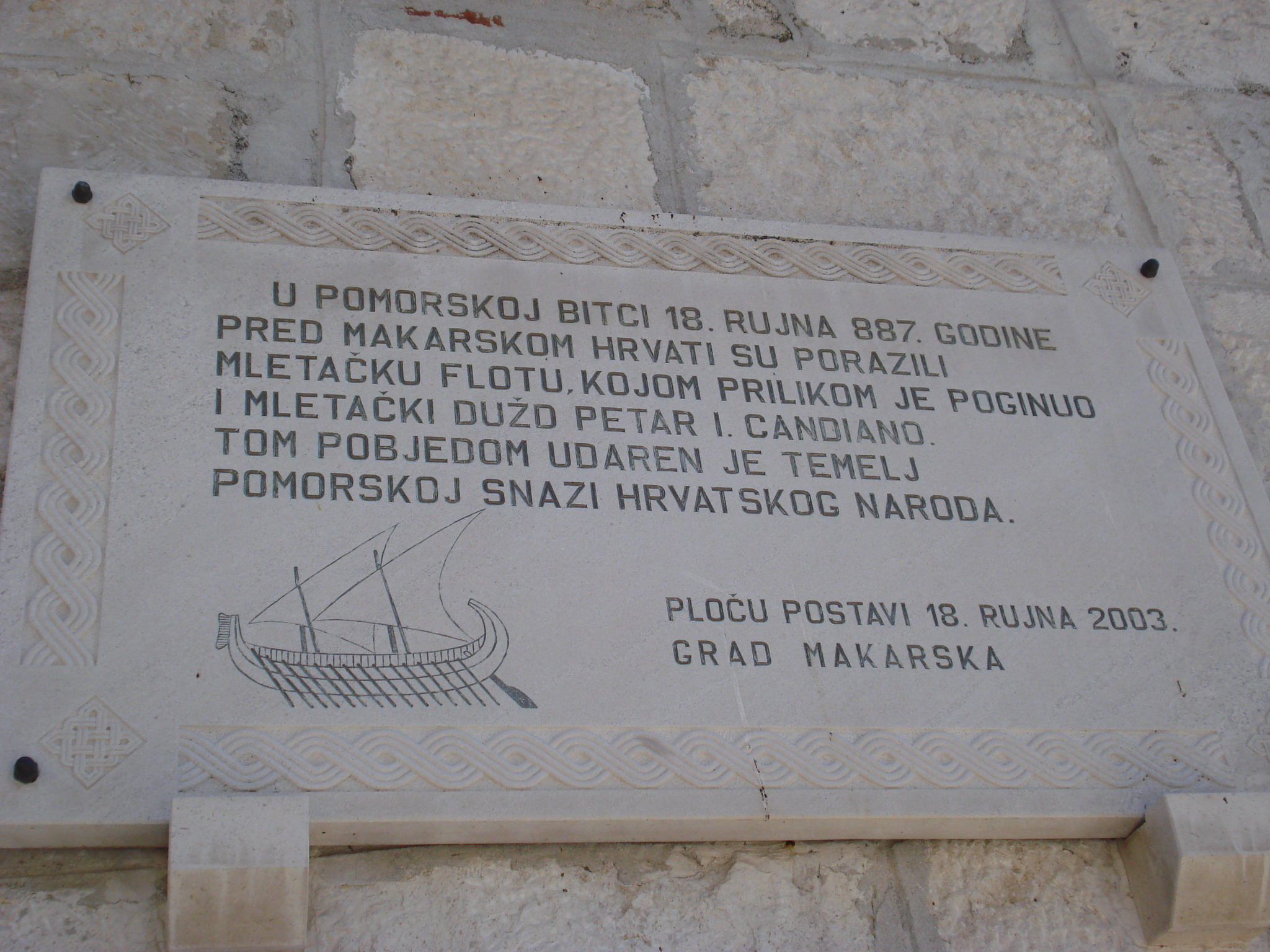
- Memorial plaque to the naval battle of Makarska
Date	18 September 887
Location	Makarska (modern-day Croatia)
Result	Narentine victory
Territorial changes	Slavic Narentine pirates establish dominance over Adriatic Sea

Belligerents
Narentines; Duchy of Croatia	Republic of Venice

Commanders and leaders
Branimir	Pietro I Candiano †

Strength
Unknown	12 large ships

The Battle of Makarska was a major confrontation on the sea between Slavic Narentine pirates and Republic of Venice, which occurred on 18 September 887.

== Prelude ==
In 887, Pietro I Candiano was elected as a Doge of Venice. The Slavic Narentine pirates dominated Adriatic Sea for a long time, which was something Candiano wanted to put an end to. Candiano sent fleet to deal with the Slavic pirates, but these brought no result. However, Candiano wasn't deterred and decided to lead the expedition himself. On August 887, Venetian fleet reached Makra country town and achieved initial success, where they destroyed 5 Narentine ships.

== Battle ==
On 18 September, the Narentines organised for a battle and were led by Duke Branimir. Doge Candiano had 12 well-equipped large ships at his command and was confident about his expedition. Branimir likely had a similar fleet equipment under his command, as he wouldn't have been able to stand a chance otherwise. Branimir intended to ambush the Venetian fleet and attack them when they least expected it, to avoid enormous damage from Venetian heavy artillery. The size of Branimir likely had more ships under his command.

With all factors taken into account, the Narentines were likely aware of the movement of the Venetian fleet, which they used to their advantage. The Narentines at first sent out a few ships towards the Venetian fleet, as part of an ambush. The course of the battle was going in the Venetians' favour, until the rest of the Nerentine fleet appeared and surrounded the Venetian fleet, forcing them to move in the direction of Makarska. The Venetians were in an unfavourable position and were ultimately defeated.

== Aftermath ==
The Venetian fleet was forced into disorganised retreat, including leaving behind Doge Candiano's body who died in battle. Doge's body was later recovered in secret by Andrea Tribuno (Andrew the Tribune). As a result of the defeat at Makarska, the Venetians were forced to pay tribute to Narentine Slavs, including for safe passage, and recognise Narentine superiority on the Adriatic Sea for 100 years. Venetian chronicles don't mention any conflicts with Nerentines onwards until 948.

== Legacy ==
In Croatia, the victory over the Venetian fleet by Branimir is celebrated annually on 18 September, as part of Croatian Navy Day.

== Bibliography ==
- Poparić, Bare (1937). Borbe Hrvata za Jadran od VII. do kraja XI. stoljeća u povodu 1050. godišnjice velike pobjede na moru (in Croatian). Matica hrvatska.
