= Pietro I Candiano =

Doge of the Republic of Venice in 887

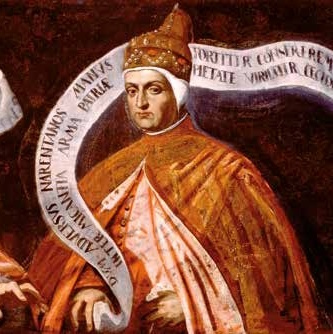
- Portrait in the Doge’s Palace

Doge of Venice
- Reign: 17 April 887 – 18 September 887
- Predecessor: Giovanni II Participazio
- Successor: Giovanni II Participazio
- Born: c. 842; Venice
- Died: 18 September 887 (aged c. 45); Makarska, Republic of Venice (now Croatia)
- Burial: Basilica of Sant'Eufemia, Grado
- Issue: Pietro II Candiano
- House: Participazio

Pietro I Candiano (c. 842 – 18 September 887) was the Doge of Venice from 17 April 887 until his death on 18 September 887.

A member of the House of Candiano, he was the first of five members of the family to hold the dogeship during the 9th and 10th centuries. His brief reign was marked by military expeditions against the Slavic Narentines, in one of which he was killed, becoming the first Venetian doge to die in battle. In some historical works, he is also referred to as "the Pious doge".

== Biography ==
=== Early life ===
Pietro Candiano was a member of the recently established House of Candiano, which emerged as a prominent political force in Venice during the social and economic transformations of the second half of the 9th century. The family's rise reflected the growing influence of new aristocratic lineages alongside the older Venetian nobility. Over the following century, the Candiano family would dominate the dogeship, largely basing its political success on popular support.

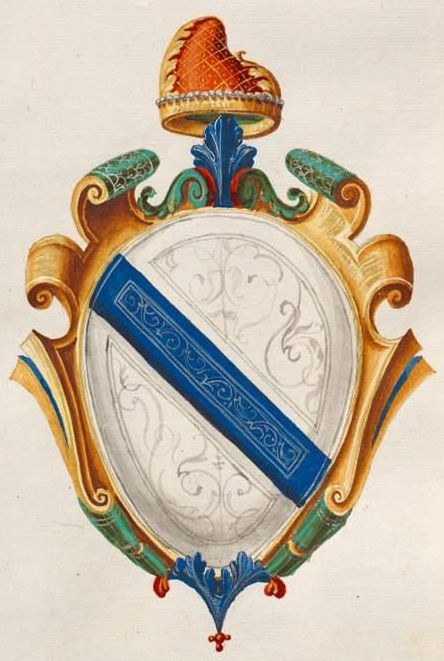
Coat of Arms of the House of Candiano

Little is known about Pietro's early life before his election as doge. He had a son, with his otherwise unattested wife, named Pietro, who later became Doge of Venice in 932.

=== Dogeship ===
On 17 April 887, Pietro Candiano was acclaimed Doge by the Venetian people while his predecessor, Giovanni II Participazio, was still formally in office. Giovanni subsequently legitimized this unprecedented transfer of power by formally investing Candiano with the ducal insignia before retiring. Candiano's reign lasted only five months and was dominated by military affairs. Although his early death prevented him from developing a domestic policy, he sought to protect Venetian commercial interests by confronting the Slavic pirates, particularly the Narentines, who threatened navigation of Venetian ships along the Dalmatian coast.

Two military expeditions were launched against the Narentines. The first ended unsuccessfully. During the second, Candiano personally commanded a fleet of twelve ships that sailed to Makarska (Italian: Macarsca), where he sank five Narentine ships. He then landed near Makarska and advanced inland, where the Venetians were defeated in a brief engagement on 18 September 887, during which Candiano was killed in battle, becoming the first Venetian doge to die in combat. His body was recovered by a soldier named Andrea Tribuno and buried in the Basilica of Sant'Eufemia in Grado.

Candiano's defeat marked a turning point in Venetian policy toward the Slavs. Following his death, the Venetians began to pay prince Branimir of Croatia (879–892) an annual tribute for the right to travel and trade in the Croatian part of the Adriatic; between Pietro's death in 887 and 948, no new war was recorded with the Croats, which is thought to show the Venetian government paid tribute to maintain the peace.

Following Candiano's death, Giovanni II Participazio was re-elected doge but was forced to abdicate permanently after only a few months because of his failing health. He was in turn succeeded by Pietro Tribuno.

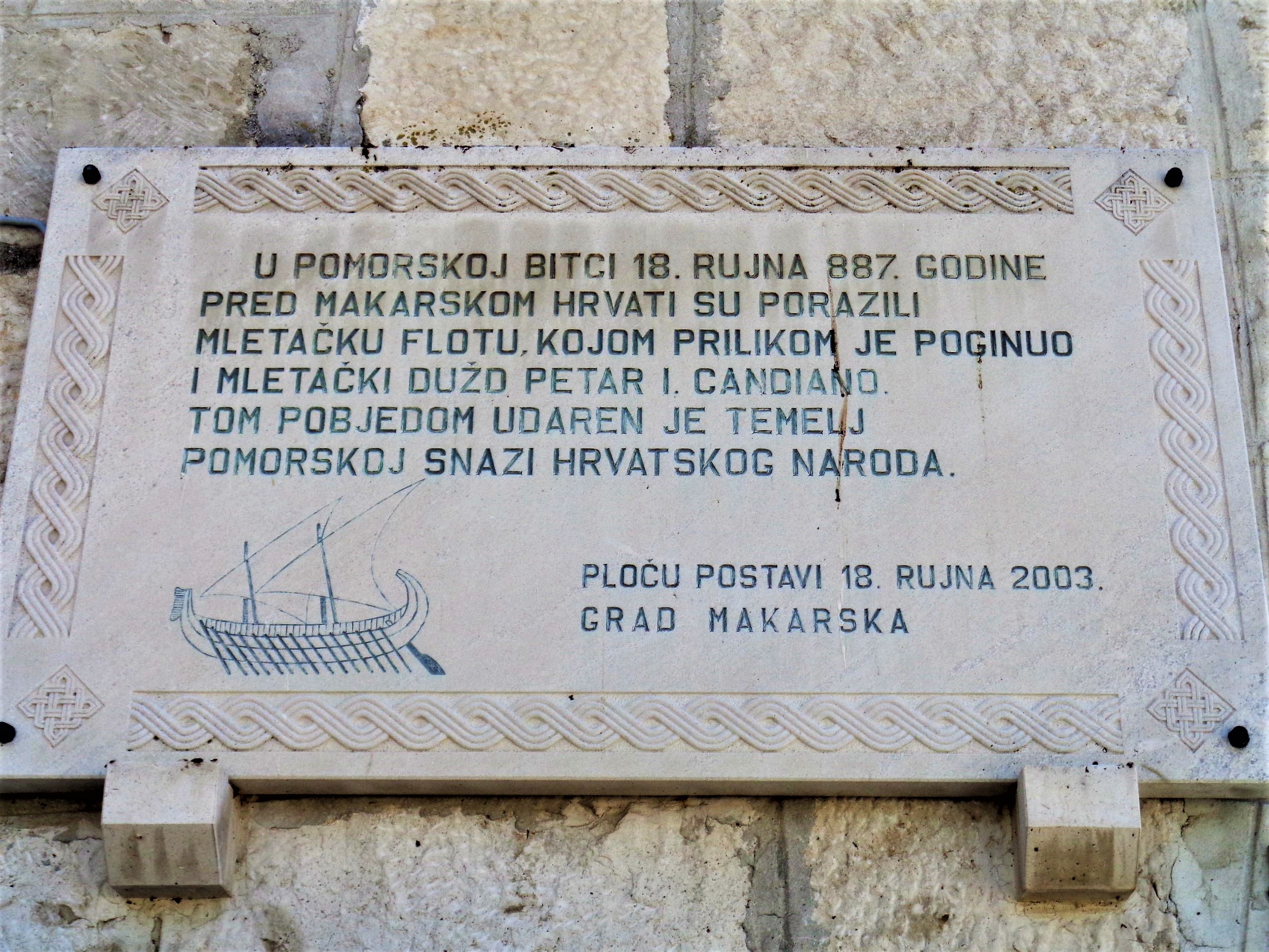
Memorial stone plaque to Croatian victory over Venetian forces led by Candiano in the battle of Makarska on 18 September 887

== Legacy ==
Pietro I Candiano is depicted in the posthumous series of official portraits of the doges of Venice in the Doge's Palace. The original gallery was established in the 1360s under doge Marco Cornaro as a chronological sequence of Venetian rulers, each shown holding a scroll inscribed with a summary of his achievements. After the original paintings were destroyed in the fire of 1577, the series was recreated, with Domenico Tintoretto executing most of the surviving portraits. The scroll held by Pietro I Candiano contains the following inscription in latin:

DUM ADVERSUS NARENTANOS MANUS FORTITER CONSEREREM INTER MICANTIA ARMA PATRIÆ PIETATE VIRILITER CECIDI

[While I fought bravely against the Narentines, amid the glitter of arms, I fell heroically for the love of my homeland.]

== See also ==
- List of doges of Venice
- Battle of Makarska

== Sources ==
- Norwich, John Julius. A History of Venice. Alfred A. Knopf: New York, 1982.

Political offices
Preceded by Giovanni II Participazio	Doge of Venice; 887	Succeeded by Giovanni II Participazio
