= Narentines =

South Slavic tribe

Coordinates: 43.1505969°N 17.3879242°E

Pagania of the Narentines
- 9th century–11th century
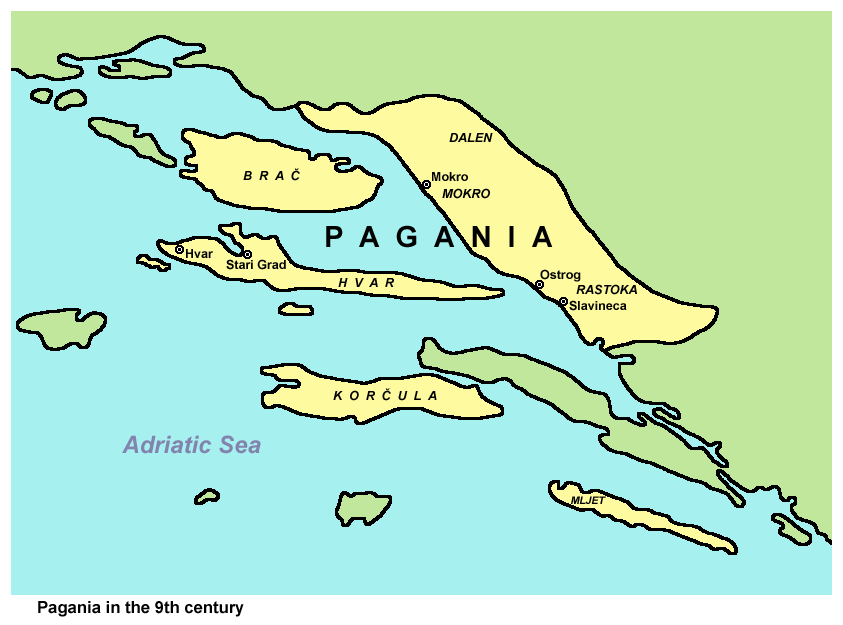
- Narentine State or Pagania in the 9th century, according to De Administrando Imperio.
- Common languages: Slavic
- Religion: Slavic paganism
- Government: Chiefdom
- Prince
- History
  - Formed: 9th century
  - Conquered by Venetians: 11th century
Succeeded by
Republic of Venice
- Today part of: Croatia

The Narentines were a South Slavic tribe noted as pirates on the Adriatic Sea in the 9th and 10th centuries. They occupied an area of southern Dalmatia centered at the river Neretva (Narenta). Named Narentani in Venetian sources, they were called Paganoi, "pagans", by the Greeks, as they were still pagan after the Christianization of the neighbouring tribes. They were fierce enemies of the Republic of Venice, attacking Venetian merchants and clergy traveling through the Adriatic, and even raiding close to Venice itself and defeating the doge several times. Venetian–Narentine peace treaties did not last long, as the Narentines quickly returned to piracy. They were finally defeated in a Venetian crackdown at the turn of the 10th century and disappeared from sources by the 11th century.

== Terminology ==
The word Narentine is a demonym derived from the local Neretva River (Latin: Narenta). The terms "Narentines", "Pagania" or "Pagans" are found in two contemporary sources: De Administrando Imperio (DAI), a mid-10th century Greek work, and Chronicon Venetum et Gradense, a Venetian chronicle by John the Deacon from the early 11th century. In De Administrando Imperio of Byzantine Emperor Constantine VII Porphyrogenitus (r. 913–959), the tribe is called Paganoi (Greek: Παγανοὶ, Παγανοἰ), and their polity Pagania (Παγανὶα, Παγανἰα), in Greek, while also noting that in Latin they are called Arentanoi (Αρεντανοἰ) and their polity Arenta (Αρεντα). Chronicler John the Deacon used the geographical term Narentani (as in princeps Narentanorum, Narrentanos Sclavos). In Serbo-Croatian, the tribal name is rendered as Neretljani (Неретљани), Neretvani and Pagani (Пагани), while the polity mostly as Paganija (Паганија).

== Geography and economy ==
In DAI's chapters Story of the province of Dalmatia and Of the Pagani, also called Arentani, and of the country they now dwell in, the geography of Pagania is described. Pagania had the counties (župa (zoupanias)) of Rhastotza, Mokros and Dalen. Rhastotza and Mokros lay by the coast, and had galleys, while Dalen was distant from the sea and was based on agriculture. Pagania had the inhabited cities of Mokron (Makarska), Beroullia (presumably Brela), Ostrok (Zaostrog) and Slavinetza (near Gradac), and the large islands of Kourkra/Kiker with a city (Korčula), Meleta/Malozeatai (Mljet), Phara (Hvar) and Bratzis (Brač). The Pagani raised flocks on the islands. Islands in the vicinity but not part of Pagania were Chora (presumably Sušac), Iës (Vis) and Lastobon (Lastovo). Croatia was situated to the northwest, and Zachumlia to the east; Serbia was situated inland to the northeast, behind Pagania, Zachumlia, Travunia and Dioklea, and bordered to Croatia on the Tzentina (Cetina) River.

== History ==
The Sclaveni (South Slavs) overwhelmed the Balkans in the 6th century. In 639 AD, Narona, until then a flourishing Roman city, was destroyed by a horde of Avars and Slavs. A few years later, Slavic tribes took control of the lower Neretva. The Slavs built a new town on the ruins of Narona, and erected a monument to their Slavic god Svetovid, on the ruins of Roman temples. According to Evans, Narentia became a stronghold for pagans in the Balkans, similarly to Balto-Slavs in Rügen (at Jaromarsburg). In 642, Slavs invaded southern Italy and attacked Siponto, by ship from the Dalmatian coast. Slavic naval raids on the Adriatic increased and it became unsafe for travel.

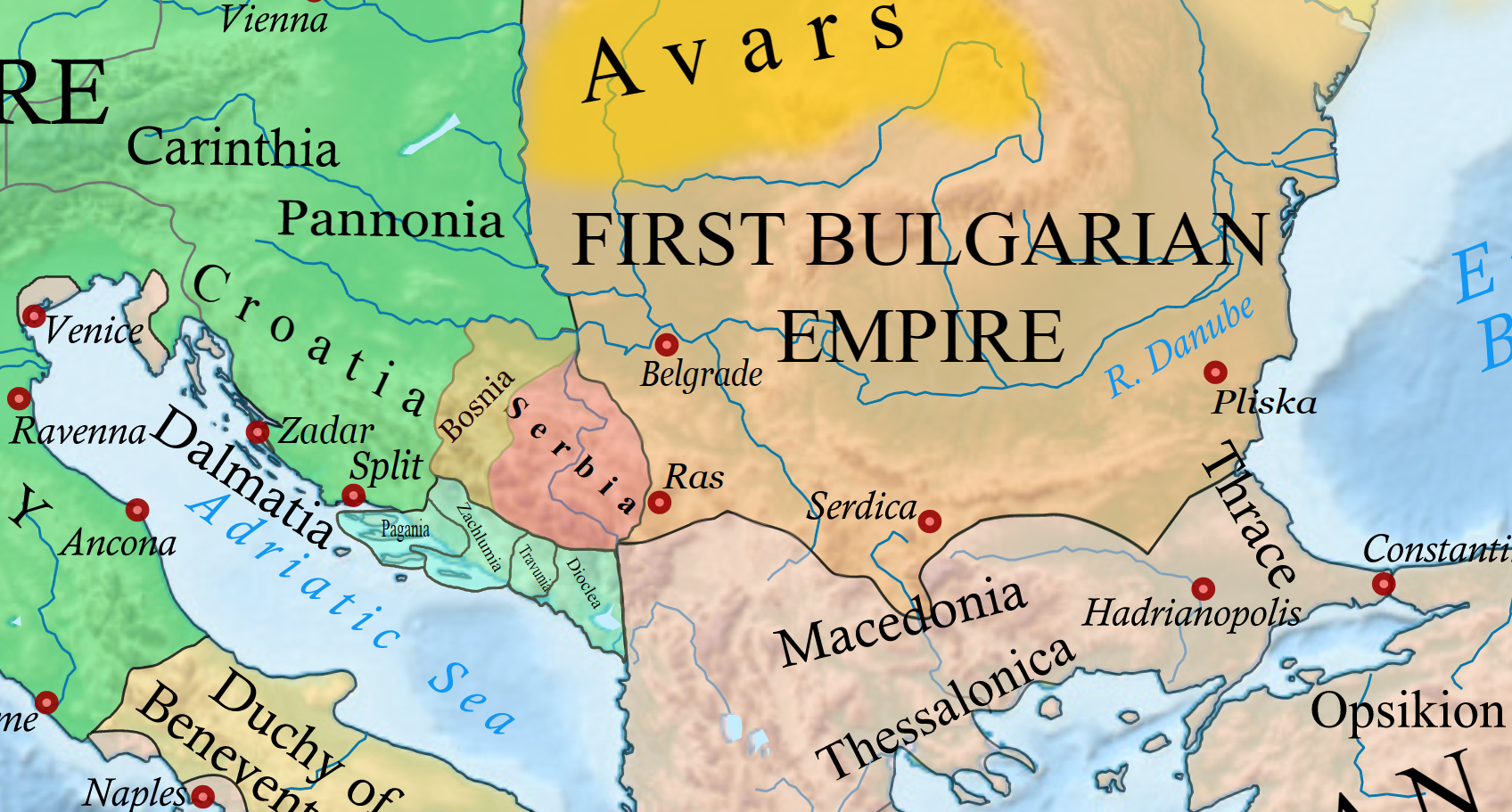
Slavic principalities in the early 9th century.

The first conflicts between the Venetians and Narentines came immediately before 830, around which time the first peace agreement was signed between the two (the Venetian Doge and Sclavorum de insula Narrentis). Narentine Slavs sent envoys to Doge Giovanni I Participazio (r. 829–836). P. Skok believes this period also being the first contact between Venice and the middle Dalmatian islands. According to Šafárik (1795–1861), by the beginning of the 9th century their power had increased so much that Doge Giovanni I attacked them and then offered them peace. The Republic of Venice was de facto subordinate the Byzantine Empire, a period in which Venice expanded its trade relations towards the East. In the first half of the 9th century Byzantium was struck by internal unrest, while the Bulgars and Arabs strengthened themselves thanks to this. Arabs took Crete in 825, Palermo in 831, Taranto in 839, then after destroying the Venetian navy by 840, they roamed freely in the Adriatic. In 841 Arabic ships attacked Adriatic cities and reached a confluence of the Padua river, while smaller contingents attacked Budva, Roza and Lower Kotor. In 842 the Arabs conquered Bari, and in 846 reached Rome itself. The Venetian navy, obliged to defend the Byzantine Adriatic, were occupied almost fully with battles with the Arabs. The Byzantine navy rarely appeared, and with small numbers of ships. This, and Arab harassment, gave the Slavic pirates around the Neretva upswing to develop their ship capabilities. When the Venetian navy was in Sicilian waters as guards in 827–828, the Narentines received momentum; when the Venetian navy returned, they calmed down. Venetian chronicles speak of a Narentine leader having been baptized in Venice, for greater security for the latter; however, the Narentines are unsteady and deceptive as their sea; as soon as events in Venice or the Adriatic worsen, the Narentines continued their piracy. One of their attacks in 834–835, when they robbed and killed some Venetian merchants returning from Benevento, caused great resentment against them in Venice.

In order to stop these assaults, the Venetians undertook a large expedition against the Dalmatian Slavic pirates in 839. Doge Pietro Tradonico sent warships against the Slavic lands (Sclavenia). According to F. Šišić Doge Pietro ordered an attack on the Narentines in the spring of 839. According to V. Klaić, Tradonico had first defeated and made peace with the Croats under Mislav, then proceeded to attack the Narentine islands and make peace with Narentine leader Drosaico. There are no information on the fights that year, but it is known that peace was concluded with Croats and a part of the Narentines. Venetian chronicler John the Deacon (1008) records a renewal of the peace treaty signed by Drosaico (ad Narrentanas insulas cum Drosaico, Marianorum iudice, similiter fedus instituit). The peace with the Narentines did not last long, perhaps as the Narentines signed it to avoid danger, or more likely because it was not concluded with all, but a tribe or clan of the Narentines. In 840 the Venetians attacked Narentine leader Ljudislav, ending in failure; Ljudislav (Liuditus sclavus), possibly a successor or co-ruler of Drosaico, defeated the Venetian Doge and killed hundreds of his men. According to Klaić it was the Narentines who broke the peace. It seems that Narentine piracy even reached Istria by February 840. The 840 Venetian–Frankish treaty included common fight against Slavic tribes (generationes Sclavorum inimicas). After two defeats to the Venetian navy by the Arabs immediately after, the Venetians were unable to enter new fights with the Dalmatian Slavs. In 846 the Narentines reached close to Venice itself, and raided nearby Caorle.

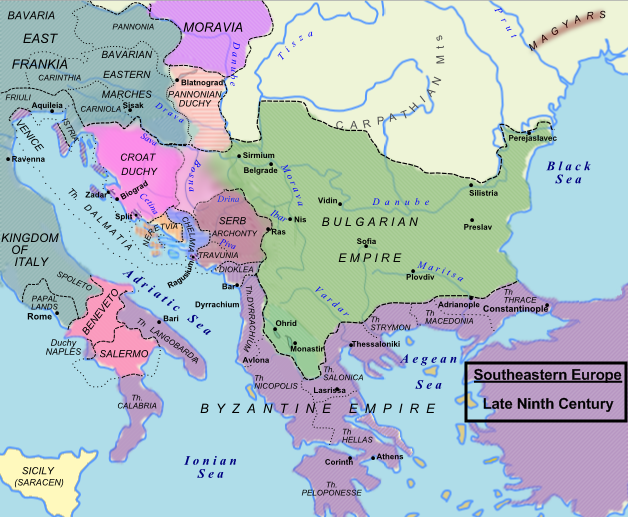
Western Balkan polities in the late 9th century.

The arrival of Basil I (r. 867–886) to the Byzantine throne led to important changes in Byzantium; energetic, he managed to enter closer ties with the Bulgarians, and even the distant Croats, and protected the Empire well. When Ragusa (Dubrovnik) asked for the emperor's help against the threat of the Saracens, he dispatched a strong navy into the Adriatic. Byzantine admiral Niketas Ooryphas took up closer contacts with the Slavic tribes around Ragusa, the Zachumlians, Travunians and Kanalites, and invited them to jointly combat the Saracens, both on land and sea, in 869. Only Slavic tribes of southern Dalmatia were called to cooperate; to the north, the Croats and Dalmatians entered relations with Italian king Louis at the dismay of the Byzantines. When some "Slavs" (Narentines according to Narayan) in March 870 kidnapped the Bishop of Rome's emissaries returning home from the Fourth Council in Constantinople, the Byzantines used this as a good pretext to attack and force them into submission (871). The DAI mentions that the Narentines were called "pagans, because they did not accept baptism in the time when all Serbs were baptized", which is placed during Basil's rule. The Narentines are not mentioned in relation to the Byzantine military expedition on Bari dispatched by Basil I (r. 867–886), in which other Dalmatian Slavs participated. The Croats, Serbs, Zachlumians, Travunians, Konavlians, Ragusans, "with all the men of the towns of Dalmatia", crossed over the sea to Langobardia and took Bari. Basil returned Dalmatia under Byzantine rule by 878, and a large part of Dalmatia was put under the Patriarchate of Constantinople. The DAI claims that the Dalmatian Slavs asked Basil I to baptize them; the Christianization of the Narentines seems to have failed. According to Evans, the Narentines remained pagan until 873, when Byzantine admiral Ooryphas persuaded them to accept baptism. While Doge Orso I Participazio and his son Giovanni II Participazio made peace and an alliance with the Croats after 876, the Venetians were still at war with the Narentines.

In 880 the Venetian–Frankish treaty was renewed. In 887 Doge Pietro I Candiano sent troops against the Narentine Slavs, landing at the "Slavic Hill" (mons Sclavorum), putting the Slavs to flight. The Narentines were defeated in a battle in August 887 at Makarska, and their five ships were destroyed with axes. With help from neighbours, the Narentines decisively defeated the Venetian navy on 18 September 887, with the Doge killed in action and his body left laying (Andrea Tribun later secretly took the body to Venice). From this time until 948 the Venetian chronicles do not mention conflicts with the Croats, which would mean that the Venetians offered peace and paid tribute to the Croats.

Pagania became under control of Serbian ruler Petar Gojniković (r. 892–917). Petar and the Byzantine commander of Dyrrhachion Leo Rhabdouchos met in Narentine lands regarding an alliance against the Bulgars. Michael of Zahumlje, who had been pushed out from Zahumlje to the neighbouring islands by Petar, informed the Bulgars about these negotiations. In 917 Petar was tricked by the Bulgars, who then annexed Serbia in 924–927, until Časlav returned to Serbia and rebuilt the state, in Byzantine alliance. Some scholars consider that Časlav's state expanded into Pagania, but it is improbable due to lack of evidence. In the 940s, the islands of Brač and Hvar, which had earlier become part of the Croatian kingdom, seceded during Ban Pribina's rebellion and rejoined the Narentine province. The Narentines took advantage of the internal unrest in Croatia after the death of Krešimir I of Croatia (945) and took the islands of Sušac, Vis and Lastovo. In 948 the Narentines were at war with Venetian Doge Pietro III Candiano, who sent 33 war galleys under Urso Badovario and Pietro Rozollo; the Narentines managed to defend themselves. The Venetians were forced to pay tribute to the Narentines for safe sea passage. Serbia collapsed after Časlav's death in ca. 960, into smaller units.

In 997, the Narentines increased raids against Latin and Venetian towns, and they had close ties with Croat ruler Svetoslav Suronja, who at the time fought his two brothers over the throne; this relation caused the Latin Dalmatian towns and Venice to turn against Svetoslav. In 998, the Republic of Venice, under the Byzantine Emperor, exerted control over the Byzantine Dalmatian towns; Dalmatian Croatia was in civil war; the Narentines were semi-independent, raiding the Adriatic, particularly against Venice. As Venice gained authority in Dalmatia, some Dalmatian towns that felt threatened allied with the Narentines. The Venetians then interved and defeated the Narentines and their Croatian allies decisively on sea, resulting in Narentine power decline. The Neretljani principality in the 11th century was part of the Croatian Kingdom.

On 9 May 1000, Venetian Doge Pietro II Orseolo decided to conquer the allied Croats and Narentines, protecting the interests of their trading colonies and the Latin Dalmatian citizenry. Without difficulty, he struck the entire eastern Adriatic coastline - with only the Narentines offering him some resistance. As a counterattack, the Narentines kidnapped 40 of the foremost citizens of Zara (Zadar) and stole a transport of goods from Apulia. On their way home, Pietro II dispatched 10 ships that surprised them between Lastovo and Sušac and took them as prisoners to Trogir. Narentine emissaries came to the Doge's temporary residence at Split (Spalato) to beg for the release of the prisoners. They guaranteed that the Narentine prince himself would show up with his men and renounce the old rights to tax the Venetians for free passage. All prisoners were allowed to return to their homes, except for six that were kept as hostages. Lastovo and Korčula continued to oppose the Venetians. Korčula was conquered by Pietro II and Lastovo fell too after long bloody fights. As Lastovo was very infamous in the Venetian world for being a pirate haven, the Doge ordered it to be evacuated in order to be razed. After the denizens of Lastovo refused to concur, the Venetians attacked and razed it to the ground.

== Dux Marianorum ==
In the historical sources there exist a title of iudex and rex of Marianorum and Morsticus. There is no consensus in historiography whether they represent nobles of Narentines or nobles of Croatian Kingdom. Croatian historian Miho Barada was influential for the emergence of the idea of Mariani as the third name for the Narentines and identifying people with these titles to the Narentines. However, the identification is very problematic, and modern historiography argues that they were also one of the local titles of dukes who served the king of Croatia. If they were titles of an independent ruler, for example in the case of rex Berigoj, then Narentines only from 1050 became part of the Kingdom of Croatia.

The recorded personalities are iudex Marianorum Drosaico (Družak) in 839 by Venetian chronicler John the Deacon (1008) records a renewal of Venetian–Narentine peace treaty signed by Drosaico (Ad Narrantanas insulas cum Drosaico, Marianorum iudice, similiter fedus instituit); iudex Marianorum and rex Marioanourm Berigoj from a 1050 charter by priest Ivan from Split giving himself and church of St. Sylvester on island Biševo to the Benedictine monastery of St Mary of Tremiti; dux Marianorum and morsticus Jacobum (Jakov) from Split in the escort of Croatian king Demetrius Zvonimir and Stephen II of Croatia per three sources and Supetar Cartulary; dux Marianorum and Morsticus Rusin during the reign of Demetrius Zvonimir and early 1090s per Supetar Cartulary; rex of Croatia Slavac, brother of Rusin with ban Petar in 1090 per Supetar Cartulary.

== Legacy ==
There is a historical festival called matrimonio in Venice commemorating the victory over the Narentines, held on Candlemas.

== Historiography ==
The question of the ethnic designation of the tribe, whether it, apart from being Slavic, was to be described as Serb or Croat, is often found in historiography. The earliest information about the Narentines is from the early 9th century, compiled in the Chronicon Venetum et Gradense. The Venetian chronicle used the Slavic ethnonym (Latin: Narrentanos Sclavos) to refer to the Narentines. De Administrando Imperio also gives information about the Narentines and there, the Narentines are described as descendants from the "unbaptized Serbs" that settled Dalmatia from an area near Thessaloniki while earlier coming there from White Serbia under the protection of Byzantine Emperor Heraclius (r. 610–641), and that are called as Pagans because they did not accept baptism at the time when all the Serbs were baptized.

In the 19th century, historian Pavel Jozef Šafárik (1795–1861) said that the first information on Serbs in history was from events regarding the Narentines. Konstantin Josef Jireček (1854–1918) treated them as a distinct South Slavic tribe. Croatian historians Miho Barada (1889–1957) and Nada Klaić also defined them as "neither Croats nor Serbs". Croatian historian Ferdo Šišić (1869–1940) said that the Neretva population was "ever and always fully identical to the Croat [population], including also its Chakavian dialect" (1952). Serbian historiography in the 19th and 20th century often considered the Narentines to be Serbs. Vladimir Ćorović (1885–1941) treated the Narentines as the first of the Serb tribes to take the initiative of fighting, not for defence and tribal organization, but for the liberty of selfish desires and security raids. Serbian historian Mihailo Dinić (1899–1970) considered that it cannot be established the accuracy of the information, and possibly only represents political development and spreading of Serbian name through a larger tribal alliance until the 9th century. Czech historian Francis Dvornik in his analysis of DAI chapters concluded that they were more likely of Croatian than Serbian origin and the account is rather a political "ante-dating by three centuries the state of affairs in his own day". Croatian historian Vladimir Košćak believed that the Narentines were under Croat rule from Trpimir until Domagoj (d. 876), and that after the latter's death, they sent emissaries to Basil I and recognized his rule, which was however short-lived as spanning only to the fall of Byzantine protégé Zdeslav (879) when the Narentines again fell away from Byzantium; Košćak wanted to reduce Byzantine rule also to the south of Pagania, claiming that the provinces of Pagania, Zachumlia, Travunia and Duklja again came under Croat rule during Branimir (r. 879–892). This theory was criticized by Božidar Ferjančić.

In modern historiography, Romanian-American historian Florin Curta agreed with those historians who "rightly interpreted as an indication that in the mid-tenth century the coastal zhupanias were under the control of the Serbian zhupan Časlav, who ruled over the regions in the interior and extended his power westwards across the mountains to the coast". Serbian historian Tibor Živković also considered it a reflection of the political situation in the 10th century, that there's no certainty the Narentines and others were Serbs or Croats or separate tribes which arrived with Serbs or Croats to the Balkans, and that these ethnic identities are the result of political rather than ethnic development related to respective principalities. He also noted that "it was stated in the DAI that the Serbs had been baptized much earlier, and therefore, the Pagans could not have belonged to the Serb tribe. There is information in chapter 32, that the Serbs controlled Pagania in ca. 895, during the rule of the Archon Peter, and from this political situation Constantine would have been able to write that the Pagans belonged to the Serbian tribe." Croatian historian Neven Budak also holds that remarks regarding the Narentines were related to the political situation at the time and that the dispute between Croatian and Serbian historiographies regarding Narentines ethnicity is pointless. Budak wrote that the Narentines were "undoubtedly a distinct ethnic group", who "disappeared as a separate ethnicity when their principality was joined into Croatia". According to Croatian historian Hrvoje Gračanin both the account about the settlement of Croats in Pannonia and Serbs in Pagania and near principalities in DAI do not reflect Croatian or Serbian ethnic origin but rather a political rule during the 9th and 10th century. In a similar fashion Croatian historian Ivo Goldstein asserted that the Narentines "could not be regarded neither Serbs nor Croats", but should be considered as part of Croatian history. In Serbian (e.g. Sima Ćirković), and partly Croatian historiography, they are often considered as Serbs or Croats and their polity as part of medieval Serbian or Croatian state, but such a consideration is not taking into account the "complexity of multi-layered identities" by which "the Slavic population differentiated into more than two ethnogenetic nuclei". Croatian historian Mladen Ančić recently argued in his critical analysis of historical sources that Narentines/Paganians and Narentia/Pagania did not exist as a separate people and polity with such a name, they were called Humljani and Hum was located West of river Neretva, while East of it was Zachlumia ("behind Hum").

In the Chronicle of the Priest of Duklja, a work written by a Catholic bishop likely for a Croatian ruler in ca. 1300–10, the southern Dalmatian principalities are referred to as part of "Red Croatia". While later parts of the Chronicle of the Priest of Duklja are considered of high value, events described in the early Middle Ages are largely discredited in historiography.

== See also ==
- Dalmatia (theme)
- History of Dalmatia

== Sources ==
- Ančić, Mladen (2011a). "Miho Barada i mit o Neretvanima" [Miho Barada and the myth of Neretva]. Povijesni prilozi (in Croatian). 30 (41): 17–43.
- Ančić, Mladen (2011b). "Ranosrednjovjekovni Neretvani ili Humljani: Tragom zabune koju je prouzročilo djelo De administrando imperio" [The Early Medieval Narentines or Chulmians: Tracing the confusion caused by De administrando Imperio]. In Lučić, Ivica (ed.). Hum i Hercegovina kroz povijest: Zbornik radova. Hrvatski Institut za povijest. ISBN 9789536324965.
- Brković, Milko (October 2001). "The Papal Letters of the second half of the IXth Century to addressees in Croatia". Radovi (in Croatian) (43). Institute for Historical Sciences of the Croatian Academy of Sciences and Arts in Zadar: 29–44.
- Budak, Neven (1994). Prva stoljeća Hrvatske. Hrvatska sveučilišna naklada. ISBN 9789531690324.
- Budak, Neven (2018), Hrvatska povijest od 550. do 1100. [Croatian history from 550 until 1100], Leykam international, ISBN 978-953-340-061-7, archived from the original on 3 October 2022
- Ćirković, Sima (2004). The Serbs. Malden: Blackwell Publishing. ISBN 9781405142915.
- Ćorović, Vladimir (2001) [1997]. Istorija srpskog naroda (in Serbo-Croatian) (Internet ed.). Belgrade: Ars Libri.
- Dzino, Danijel (2023). Early Medieval Hum and Bosnia, ca. 450-1200: Beyond Myths. Taylor & Francis. ISBN 9781000893434.
- Curta, Florin (2006). Southeastern Europe in the Middle Ages, 500–1250. Cambridge: Cambridge University Press. ISBN 978-0-521-81539-0.
- Dvornik, F.; Jenkins, R. J. H.; Lewis, B.; Moravcsik, Gy.; Obolensky, D.; Runciman, S. (1962). P. J. H. Jenkins (ed.). De Administrando Imperio: Volume II. Commentary. University of London: The Athlone Press.
- Dvornik, F. (1970). Byzantine missions among the Slavs. Rutgers University Press. ISBN 9780813506135.
- Evans, Arthur (2007). Through Bosnia and the Herzegovina on Foot During the Insurrection, August and September 1875. Cosimo, Inc. pp. 363–. ISBN 978-1-60206-270-2.
- Ferjančić, Božidar (1997). Basile Ier et la restauration du pouvoir byzantin au IXème siècle (in Serbian). Vol. 36. Naučno delo. pp. 9–29.
- Filozofski fakultet (1964). Zbornik Filozofskog fakulteta. Vol. 8. Univerzitet u Beogradu; Naučno delo.
- Fine, John V. A. Jr. (1991) [1983]. The Early Medieval Balkans: A Critical Survey from the Sixth to the Late Twelfth Century. Ann Arbor: University of Michigan Press. ISBN 0-472-08149-7.
- Fine, John Van Antwerp Jr. (2006). When Ethnicity Did Not Matter in the Balkans: A Study of Identity in Pre-Nationalist Croatia, Dalmatia, and Slavonia in the Medieval and Early-Modern Periods. Ann Arbor, Michigan: University of Michigan Press. ISBN 0472025600.
- Goldstein, Ivo (1995). Hrvatski rani srednji vijek [Croatian Early Medieval]. Zavod za hrvatsku povijest Filozofskog fakulteta Sveučilišta u Zagrebu. ISBN 9789531750431.
- Gračanin, Hrvoje (2008). "Od Hrvata pak koji su stigli u Dalmaciju odvojio se jedan dio i zavladao Ilirikom i Panonijom: Razmatranja uz DAI c. 30, 75-78". Povijest U Nastavi (in Croatian). VI (11): 67–76.
- Institut za hrvatsku povijest (1974). "n/a". Radovi (in Serbo-Croatian) (6–7). Sveučilište u Zagrebu.
- Janković, Đorđe (2007). Српско поморје од 7. до 10. столећа (PDF) (in Serbian). Srpsko arheološko društvo. ISBN 978-86-904455-5-4.
- Klaić, Vjekoslav (1972). Povijest Hrvata od najstarijih vremena do svršetka XIX stoljeća (in Croatian). Nakladni zavod Matice hrvatske.
- Klaić, Nada (1971). Povijest Hrvata u ranom srednjem vijeku (in Croatian). Školska knjiga.
- Kostić, Lazo M. (1963). Srpska istorija i srpsko more (in Serbian). Srpska misao.
- Moravcsik, Gyula, ed. (1967) [1949]. Constantine Porphyrogenitus: De Administrando Imperio (2nd revised ed.). Washington D.C.: Dumbarton Oaks Center for Byzantine Studies. ISBN 9780884020219.
- Narayan, S. S. (2009). Sea pirates. Sumit Enterprises. ISBN 978-81-8420-167-3.
- Šišić, Ferdo (1990). Povijest Hrvata u vrijeme narodnih vladara (in Croatian). Nakladni zavod Matice hrvatske. ISBN 978-86-401-0080-9.
- Vedriš, Trpimir (2015). "Balkanske sklavinije i Bugarska – Hrvatska u međunarodnom kontekstu" [Balkan 'sklavinias' and Bulgaria – Croatia in the international context]. In Zrinka Nikolić Jakus (ed.). Nova zraka u europskom svjetlu: Hrvatske zemlje u ranome srednjem vijeku (oko 550 − oko 1150) [Croatian lands in the Early Middle Ages (o. 550. – o. 1150.)] (in Croatian). Zagreb: Matica hrvatska. pp. 581–608. ISBN 978-953-150-942-8.
- Živković, Tibor (2006). Portreti srpskih vladara (IX—XII vek) [Portraits of Serbian rulers (IX-XII centuries)] (in Serbian). Belgrade: Завод за уџбенике и наставна средства. ISBN 86-17-13754-1.
- Živković, Tibor (2008). Forging unity: The South Slavs between East and West 550-1150. Belgrade: The Institute of History, Čigoja štampa. ISBN 9788675585732.
- Živković, Tibor (2012a). De conversione Croatorum et Serborum: A Lost Source. Belgrade: The Institute of History.
- Živković, Tibor (2012b). "Неретљани – пример разматрања идентитета у раном средњем веку" [Arentani - an Example of Identity Examination in the Early Middle Ages]. Istorijski časopis. 61: 11–25.
- Кунчер, Драгана (2009). Gesta Regum Sclavorum. Vol. 1. Београд-Никшић: Историјски институт, Манастир Острог.
- Живковић, Тибор (2009). Gesta Regum Sclavorum. Vol. 2. Београд-Никшић: Историјски институт, Манастир Острог.
