= Pietro Tradonico =

Doge of Venice from 836 to 864

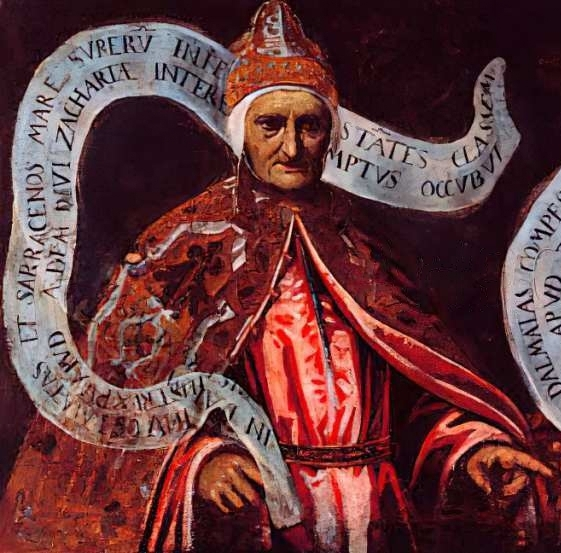

13th Doge of Venice
- In office 836–864
- Preceded by: Giovanni I Participazio
- Succeeded by: Orso I Participazio

Personal details
- Born: c. 800 Istria, Carolingian Empire
- Died: 13 September 864 Venice, Republic of Venice

Pietro Tradonico (Latin: Petrus Tradonicus; c. 800 – 13 September 864) was Doge of Venice from 836 to 864. He was, according to tradition, the thirteenth doge, though historically he is only the eleventh. His election broke the power of the Participazio family.

== History ==
An Istrian native, he was perhaps born in the late eighth or early ninth century. His family, originally from Pula, had come to Rialto from Jesolo. He was illiterate and thus signed many state documents with a signum manus. He was a warrior, not an administrator.

At his election in 836, he nominated his son Giovanni as co-regent, continuing the process begun a century earlier of establishing a hereditary dukedom with dynastic succession. All previous attempts had failed, and this would turn out no differently.

He fought the Saracens at Taranto and Sansego but was defeated. He had to deal not only with Saracen pirates but with Slavs as well. He led a large fleet against them in 839 to punish the Narentines (also called Neretvians) for raiding and slaughtering several Venetian traders returning from Benevento in 834–835. He made peace with Duke Mislav of the Croats of Dalmatia and a Narentine prince by the name of Družak (Drosaico, Marianorum judice). His military assault on the Neretvians in 840 failed, and he lost more than 100 men and had to return to Venetia. The Neretvians continued to push against him and, in 846, breached Venice itself and raided the neighboring lagoon city of Caorle.

In 840, the Carolingian Emperor Lothair I recognized the independence of Venice and its authority over the lagoon as far as the "aquas salas", i.e., the sea ("salt waters"), already recognized by Byzantium. From the latter he received the titles of spatharius and hypatus.

In spring 856, Pietro and his son and co-regent, Giovanni, hosted Emperor Louis II and his wife, Engelberga, in a three-day visit to Venice. During this visit the emperor stood godfather to Giovanni's daughter, whose name is not known.

Giovanni died in 863. Pietro himself died a year later on 13 September 864, having been ambushed and attacked by a group of malcontents while returning from vespers at the Church of San Zaccaria. His body was recovered a while later by monks of San Zaccaria, who buried him in the church. Those responsible for his murder were punished accordingly: some were executed, others condemned to exile in France and Constantinople. He was succeeded by Orso Participazio, whose rise to power was perhaps facilitated by the absence of a Tradonico heir.

== Sources ==
- Norwich, John Julius. A History of Venice. Alfred A. Knopf: New York, 1982.

Political offices
Preceded by Giovanni I Participazio	Doge of Venice; 836–864	Succeeded by Orso I Participazio
