= Pactum Lotharii =

840 treaty between Venice and the Carolingian Empire

The Pactum Lotharii is a document that was originally written and produced in 840 AD and signed by the Republic of Venice and the Carolingian Empire. Historians over time have not written much about the Pactum Lotharii. However, historians do talk about the Republic of Venice and Carolingian Italy during this time. Historians have agreed that Venice was a powerful city with many strengths in political and commercial aspects and therefore, the treaty worked to clear up several aspects of trade, borders, and military discrepancies between the two powers. The document outlines specific areas of Italy that were given to the Venetians and drew clearer borders of the Republics domain, it also outlined what circumstances the Carolingians could call upon Venetian help in military matters and specific border control issues between people. Because of the power Venice held during the ninth century, it was in poor judgement for a Carolingian conquest to occur, especially as the Carolingian Empire became increasingly characterized as a decaying empire in the time leading up to the Pactum Lotharii and stemming further into history.

== Content ==
Written in Latin, the pact reflects the administrative practices of the Carolingian court and indicates the new Venetian Republic's geographic boundaries from Cavarzere to Grado. It establishes trade agreements, legal requirements, and military cooperation. Additionally, the pact granted Carolingians considerable power over Venice by allowing them to directly interfere with Venetian Politics. Most of the involvement between the Carolingians and Venetians stemmed from Pactum Lotharii, which was updated with each change in ruler.

From a draft translation by Jenny Benham, the Pactum relays information about how the signatories handle refugees, slaves, livestock, trade, naval presence, justice, and more. The pactum describes how people running from the law in Venetia and hiding in Carolingian territory shall be returned to Venetia within sixty days if they are found, and if not, they will give the Venetians five-hundred pieces of gold for every person not returned. If slaves flee, the person who returns them will also receive a piece of gold. Additionally, the Carolingians will not knowingly buy or sell Venetian Christians and if any captives are found, the person responsible will be given to the Venetians along with their property. In terms of assistance, both sides are required to aid in naval duties as requested by Emperor Lothar I. Trade between powers is allowed as long as it maintains a balanced relationship. As for justice, the missi should be prepared to provide justice to both sides so that all can receive his complete justice. If any person were to harm another, on either side, they must pay a certain amount of gold, depending on the weight of the infraction, to make right. In relation to harm, if a person makes another person a eunuch, they themselves must also suffer the same punishment.

== Carolingian background ==
To further understand the background of the Carolingian empire, one might look at a paper by Stefan Esders titled, Roman Law in the regnum Italiae under the Emperor Lothar I (817-855): Epitomes, Manuscripts, and Carolingian Legislation. Esders comments on how Roman law had influence on Carolingian Italy. He argues that Roman law encompasses too much for it to become marginal. Esders explains how Emperor Lothar I of Italy used Roman law, as well as Lombard law, as inspiration while he was in power. Lothar I also praised Roman heritage in his laws regarding the guardianship of women. In this example, the negotiation between traditions of the Lombard and Roman groups seemed to break away from Lombard family law. Lombard Italy became upset with Lothar I and Carolingian rule because Lothar I's regulations were supporting non-Lombard women. Carolingian Italy had a plurality of laws and made it so people would be judged by their law of origin, not from a common set of laws, creating potential legal disagreements. The mix of laws in Carolingian Italy enforced by Emperor Lothar I created confusion and division in the empire, making it partly disheveled. This correlates with the idea that Carolingian Italy was not as socially and politically organized as the Republic of Venice.

The continued dishevel of Carolingian rule following the Pactum Lotharii demonstrates that the Carolingian Empire was still weakening despite the provisions of the treaty. Charles West describes the collapse in his book, The fall of a Carolingian kingdom: Lotharingia, 855-869. West claims that Charlemagne's descendants were not able to maintain the political entity he created. Lothar I died a few years after the Pactum Lotharii was signed. Following his death, Lothar I's son, Lothar II, took most of his father's lands. Lothar II's kingdom was short-lived, and the Carolingian Kingdom did not outlive its ruler. The kingdom failed swiftly, demonstrating that the Carolingian kingdom was not as strong as it seemed in its power hold of Venice in the ninth century. Lothar I's first-born son, Louis II, was in control of Italy. He required naval assistance from Byzantium, which had a large influence over Venice. Louis II was captured by the Lombards since his recent successes were threatening. Once he was released, Louis II's authority was questioned which caused the loss of Bari to the Byzantines. The collapse continued ferociously and makes historians wonder how far back the weaknesses of the Carolingian Empire extended and if it affected the Pactum Lotharii.

== Venetian background ==
West-Harling discusses how the powerful city of Venice remained under the control of the Byzantines, unlike Rome and Ravenna, which had abandoned Byzantine rule. During this time, there was some interest displayed by the Franks to take hold of Venice. Patriarch John of Grado was killed, not due to his pro-Frankish stance but due to their view of Charlemagne's coronation as a risky alliance opportunity between Venice and the Carolingian Empire. The conflict between the Malamocco tribunes and Venice's growing power might have influenced this conflict. Venice sought a defensible internal lagoon and expanded island, while Malamocco tribunes utilized Carolingian alliance against rising families, who were seeking a better geographical base. The conflict played out at the imperial level and was influenced by conflicts of interests. Venice ended up escaping the interest in Frankish rule and remained under Byzantine support.

West-Harling suggests that the Carolingian attempt at conquering Venice was driven by a need for a specific political organization and support from the Byzantines. Venice, with its significant power and balance between Lothar I and Byzantine support, was an ideal city for Carolingian conquest. West-Harling highlights that this fight was specifically over control of the city, not for Venetian independence or expansion. Recent historians have argued that the Republic of Venice had significant influence on politics and commerce, making it crucial to maintain its separate power from Italy. They also contend that Carolingian Italy's lack of advanced ruling methods led to their failure in conquering Venice. These arguments highlight the significance of the treaty's creation.

Venice was governed in a way that was common to the Byzantines because they demonstrated a form of democracy in that they chose their rulers, or “Doges”. Doges were created by a mixing of the Byzantian military leaders, the Magistri Militum, and the Lombard leaders, the duces. The two became quickly allied with each other because of their proximity, and the close relationships between them caused them to meld together, making them almost indistinct from one another. The Doges being leaders in Venice demonstrates the ties that Venetians had to the Byzantine empire and in turn shows a lack of relationship to the Carolingian Empire. Venice held much power in the trading market and is one of the reasons why it was so important to renew the Pactum Lotharii in the following years after its creation. The Pact also came at a time when the Byzantine Empire and the Carolingians had a standing treaty that had been renewed for three decades before the Pactum Lotharii was signed. This was because there was a constant Byzantine military presence in Venitia because of continued attacks from the Carolingians in an attempt to take the lagoon. The Treaty of Aachen, as it was called, officially handed over control of the Venetian lagoon to Byzantium and was signed in 812. While the Treaty of Aachen handed over complete control to the Byzantine Empire, it is not clear if the Pactum Lotharii did the same or if it made Venice its own republic.

== Bloodlines ==
During this period for the Carolingian empire, we begin to see it split due to the death of King Louis, king of the Franks. During the splitting of the empire, a civil war began to rage between the three brothers, Charles, Louis, and Lothar. According to the article written by Sam Soulsby called “After the Pact: The Precept of Emperor Lothar 1 for the Venetians”, during the civil war between him and his brothers, this could be used to Lothar's advantage because it would allow him more troops to use if needed.

== Effects ==
The historical significance of the Pactum illustrates an age of immense transformation in the Carolingian Empire, which sought to assert its authority over local and external aggressors. Lothar I required Venetian Naval support to counteract threats from the North, underlying the importance of maritime alliances in the Middle Ages. Moreover, the document can be interpreted as a reflection of the Carolingian Empire's broader interests in the Mediterranean Sea. As Lothar sought to consolidate the power of his empire over external entities, strong alliances with key partners such as Venice became necessary for their survival and well-being. This example of the interconnectedness of two different regions illustrates how local dynamics could influence broader imperial policies.

During the rule of the Carolingian Empire in the 8th and 9th century, Venice remained a loyal member of the Byzantine Empire, even though it was a part of modern-day Italy, which was under control of the Carolingians. There were militaristic attempts by the Carolingians to acquire Venice from the Byzantine Empire, to increase their foothold in the region and abolish the final holdouts of Byzantium in Italy. The Carolingian emperor, Charlemagne, attempted to conquer the city and make it a part of the larger “Italian Empire,” which was unsuccessful. Because of its status as a trade center, the state had immense amounts of power, making it possible for them to negotiate their continued alliance with Byzantium. It was also possible for the Venetians to keep their status as a part of the Byzantine Empire by still observing the governmental rules of Byzantium. They followed the same government structure as the main empire, electing dukes and a ruling clergy. There was also a standing treaty between the Carolingian and Byzantine Empires, in which the Carolingians would have to recognize the Byzantine rule of Venice in 814, which set the precedent for the eventual Pactum Lotharii. The Venetians' extremely powerful navy was often requested by both empires to help fight adversaries of both empires and of Venice itself, in the Adriatic Sea. This military power is another contributing factor to the Venetians' ability to keep their status as a part of Byzantium. Although this is one school of thought as to why the Pactum Lotharii came into existence there are other possibilities as to why.

Recognizing the historical significance of the Pactum Lotharii can provide valuable insights for modern historians and inform current discussions on medieval Mediterranean policy outcomes. As well as how documents like the Pactum Lotharii developed regional powers such as the Carolingian Empire and the Republic of Venice. Furthermore, examining the interconnections of political relations in northern Italy helps researchers to better appreciate the style of governance in the Middle Ages and the lasting impacts it had on Italian and Mediterranean culture.

The Pactum was renewed by most Carolingian emperors in the following decades with little changes. In 967, it sustained a significant rendition. Each of these renewals and versions could be used to compare against the original Pactum Lotharii to understand the specific changes made to the document. The Carolingian Empire began to decline, and it is difficult to understand the significance of the treaty for them since that is when their decline began. While the renewals may or may not be like the original, each renewal has the potential to give historians insight into how the empires changed over the years and any new impactful events that occurred. The first refusal of renewal came from Otto II in 976. However, he did end up renewing it when he required Venetian help for a South Italian campaign. Otto later began a military campaign against Venice by promoting an edict against Venetian trade and forbidding communication with the Venetians by any subjects in the Carolingian Empire. He then died before any of his plans had any real influence, which allowed the treaty to be renewed in 983 by Empresses Adelheid and Theophano. Although the Pactum Lotharii was penned and originally signed in 840, it held immense influence over the relationship between the Carolingian Empire and the Republic of Venice for centuries to follow.

== See also ==
- Economic history of Venice
