= History of the Republic of Venice =

Overview of Venice from the 8th century to 1797

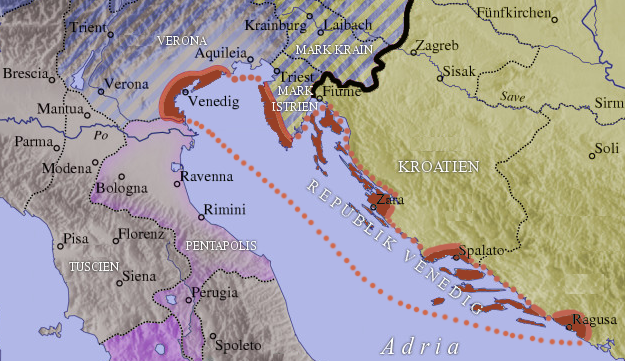
The Republic of Venice in AD 1000. The republican territory is dark red, the borders in light red.

The Republic of Venice (Venetian: Repùblega Vèneta; Italian: Repubblica di Venezia) was a sovereign state and maritime republic in Northeast Italy, which existed for a millennium between the 8th century and 1797.

It was based in the lagoon communities of the historically prosperous city of Venice, and was a leading European economic and trading power during the Middle Ages and the Renaissance, the most successful of Italy's maritime republics. By the late Middle Ages, it held significant territories in the mainland of northern Italy, known as the Domini di Terraferma, along with most of the Dalmatian coast on the other side of the Adriatic Sea, and Crete and numerous small colonies around the Mediterranean Sea, together known as the Stato da Màr.

A slow political and economic decline had begun by around 1500, and by the 18th century the city of Venice largely depended on the tourist trade, as it still does, and the Stato da Màr was largely lost.

== Origins ==
Although no surviving historical records deal directly with the founding of Venice, the history of the Republic of Venice traditionally begins with the foundation of the city at Noon on Friday, 25 March, AD 421, by authorities from Padua, to establish a trading-post in that region of northern Italy. The founding of the Venetian republic is also said to have been marked at that same event with the founding of the church of St. James. However, the church (believed to be Saint Giacomo di Rialto) dates back no further than the 11th century, at the earliest, or the mid-12th century, at the latest. The 11th century Chronicon Altinate also dates the first settlement in that region, Rivo Alto ("High Shore", later Rialto), to the dedication of that same church (i.e., San Giacometo on the bank of the current Grand Canal).

According to tradition, the original population of the region consisted of refugees from nearby Roman cities such as Padua, Aquileia, Treviso, Altino, and Concordia (modern Concordia Sagittaria), as well as from the undefended countryside, who were fleeing Hun and Germanic invasions from the mid-2nd to mid-5th centuries. This is further supported by documentation on the so-called "apostolic families", the 12 founding families of Venice who elected the first doge, who in most cases traced their lineage back to Roman families.

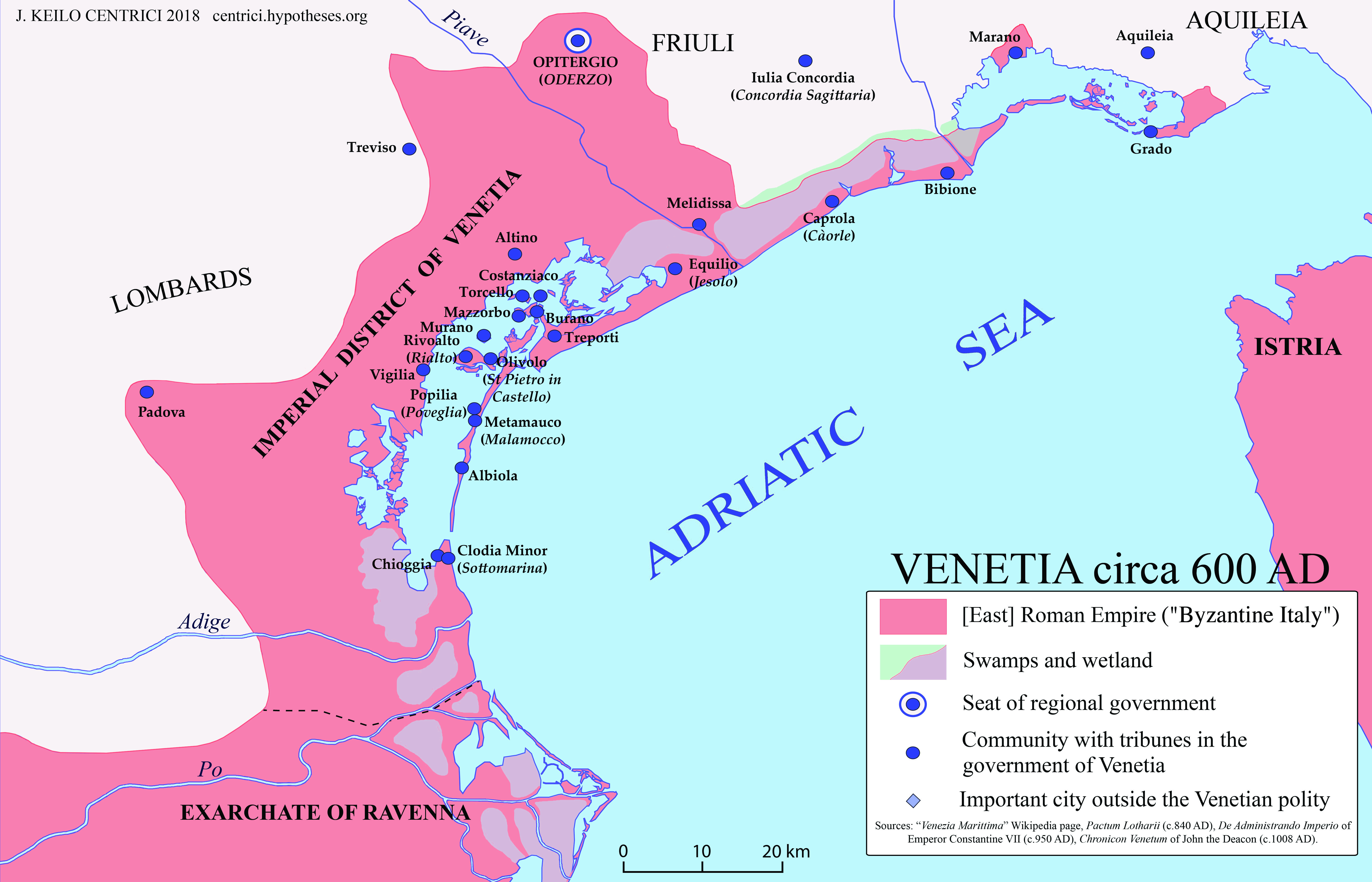
The Venetia c AD 600

The Quadi and Marcomanni destroyed the main Roman town in the area, Opitergium (modern Oderzo) in AD 166–168. This part of Roman Italy was again overrun in the early 5th century by the Visigoths and by Attila the Hun who sacked Altinum (a town on the mainland coast of the lagoon of Venice) in 452. The last and most enduring immigration into the north of the Italian peninsula, that of the Lombards in 568, was the most devastating for the north-eastern region, Venetia (modern Veneto and Friuli). It also confined the Italian territories of the Eastern Roman Empire to part of central Italy and the coastal lagoons of Venetia, known as the Exarchate of Ravenna. Around this time, Cassiodorus mentions the incolae lacunae ("lagoon dwellers"), their fishing and their saltworks and how they strengthened the islands with embankments. The former Opitergium region had finally begun to recover from the invasions when it was destroyed again, this time for good, by the Lombards led by Grimoald in 667.

As the power of the Byzantine Empire dwindled in northern Italy in the late 7th century, the lagoon communities came together for mutual defence against the Lombards, as the Duchy of Venetia. The Duchy included the patriarchates of Aquileia and Grado, in modern Friuli, by the Lagoon of Grado and Carole, east of that of Venice. Ravenna and the duchy were connected only by sea routes, and with the duchy's isolated position came increasing autonomy. The tribuni maiores formed the earliest central standing governing committee of the islands in the lagoon - traditionally dated to c. 568.

Early in the 8th century, the people of the lagoon elected their first leader Orso Ipato (Ursus), who was confirmed by Byzantium with the titles of hypatus and dux. Historically, Ursus was the first Doge of Venice. However, tradition since the early 11th century, dictates that the Venetians first proclaimed one Paolo Lucio Anafesto (Anafestus Paulicius) duke in AD 697, although the tradition dates only from the chronicle of John, deacon of Venice (John the Deacon);nonetheless, the power base of the first doges was in Eraclea.

Initially, the main settlement was elsewhere in the lagoon and not on the islands of the Rialto group which would later be the heart of Venice. One of the few early settlements attested in the Rialto group was the island of Olivolo (now called S. Pietro in Castello), at the western end of the archipelago, closer to the sandbars of the lagoon. Archaeological excavation shows that this island was already inhabited in the 5th century. 6th and 7th century Byzantine imperial seals indicate that, at this time, it was politically important. There was also a castle, perhaps from the 6th century. John the Deacon's early 11th century Chronicon Venetum reports that the diocese of Olivolo was founded in 774-76 by the doge Maurizio Galbaio (764-87), that a bishop Olberio was established in Olivolo by 775 and attributes the foundation of the cathedral of S. Pietro to bishop Orso Partecipazio and its completion to 841. Another attestation of an early settlement in the Rivo Alto group is in what was to become the sestriere (district) of Cannaregio. Whatever early settlements there were in the Rivo Alto group of islands, which was to form the city of Venice, the area did not begin to become properly urbanised until the 9th century.

== Rise ==
Orso Ipato's successor, Teodato Ipato, moved his seat from Eraclea to Malamocco (on the Lido) in the 740s. He was the son of Orso and represented the attempt of his father to establish a dynasty. Such attempts were more than commonplace among the doges of the first few centuries of Venetian history, but all were ultimately unsuccessful.

The changing politics of the Frankish Empire began to change the factional division of Venice. One faction was decidedly pro-Byzantine. They desired to remain well-connected to the Empire. Another faction, republican in nature, believed in continuing along a course towards practical independence. Another faction was pro-Frankish. Supported mostly by clergy (in line with papal sympathies of the time), they looked towards the new Carolingian king of the Franks, Pepin the Short, as the best provider of defence against the Lombards. A minor, pro-Lombard, faction , opposed close ties with these further-off powers and interested in maintaining peace with the neighbouring Lombard kingdom, which surrounded Venice except on the seaward side.

Teodato Ipato was assassinated and his throne usurped, but the usurper, Galla Gaulo, suffered a like fate within a year. During the reign of his successor, Domenico Monegario, Venice changed from a fisherman's town to a port of trade and centre of merchants. Shipbuilding was also greatly advanced. These factors led to Venetian dominance of the Adriatic.. Also during Domenico Monegario's tenure, the first dual tribunal was instituted. Each year, two new tribunes were elected to oversee the doge and prevent abuse of power.

In that period because, Venice had established itself a thriving slave trade, buying in Italy, among other places, and selling to the Moors in Northern Africa (Pope Zachary himself reportedly forbade such traffic out of Rome).

The pro-Lombard Monegario was succeeded in 764, by a pro-Byzantine Eraclean, Maurizio Galbaio. Galbaio's long reign (764-787) vaulted Venice forward to a place of prominence not just regionally but internationally and saw the most concerted effort yet to establish a dynasty. Maurizio oversaw the expansion of Venetia to the Rialto islands. He was succeeded by his equally long-reigning son, Giovanni. Giovanni clashed with Charlemagne over the slave trade and entered into a conflict with the Venetian church.

Dynastic ambitions were shattered when the pro-Frankish faction was able to seize power under Obelerio degli Antoneri in 804. Obelerio brought Venice into the orbit of the Carolingian Empire. However, by calling in Charlemagne's son Pepin, rex Langobardorum, to his defence, Obelerio raised the ire of the populace against himself and his family and they were forced to flee during Pepin's siege of Venice. The siege proved a costly Carolingian failure. It lasted six months, with Pepin's army ravaged by the diseases of the local swamps and eventually forced to withdraw. A few months later Pepin himself died, apparently as a result of a disease contracted there.

Venice thus achieved lasting independence by repelling the besiegers. This was confirmed in an agreement between Charlemagne and Nicephorus which recognized Venice as Byzantine territory and also recognized the city's trading rights along the Adriatic coast, where Charlemagne previously ordered the Pope to expel the Venetians from the Pentapolis.

== Early Middle Ages ==
The successors of Obelerio inherited a united Venice. By the Pax Nicephori (803), the two emperors had recognised Venetian de facto independence, while it remained nominally Byzantine in subservience. During the reigns of Agnello Participazio (c. 810–827) and his two sons, Venice grew into its modern form. Around 810, Agnello moved the ducal seat from Malamocco to an island of the Rivo Alto group close to the family's property near the Church of Santi Apostoli, near the eastern bank of the Grand Canal, after Pepin, the Frankish king of Italy, attacked Malamocco but failed to invade the lagoon. This marked the beginning of the urbanisation of the islands of the Rivo Alto group, heart of the modern city of Venice. Agnello's dogeship was marked by the expansion of Venice into the sea through the construction of bridges, canals, bulwarks, fortifications, and stone buildings. The modern Venice, at one with the sea, was being born. Agnello was succeeded by his son Giustiniano, who brought the body of Saint Mark the Evangelist to Venice from Alexandria and made him the patron saint of Venice.

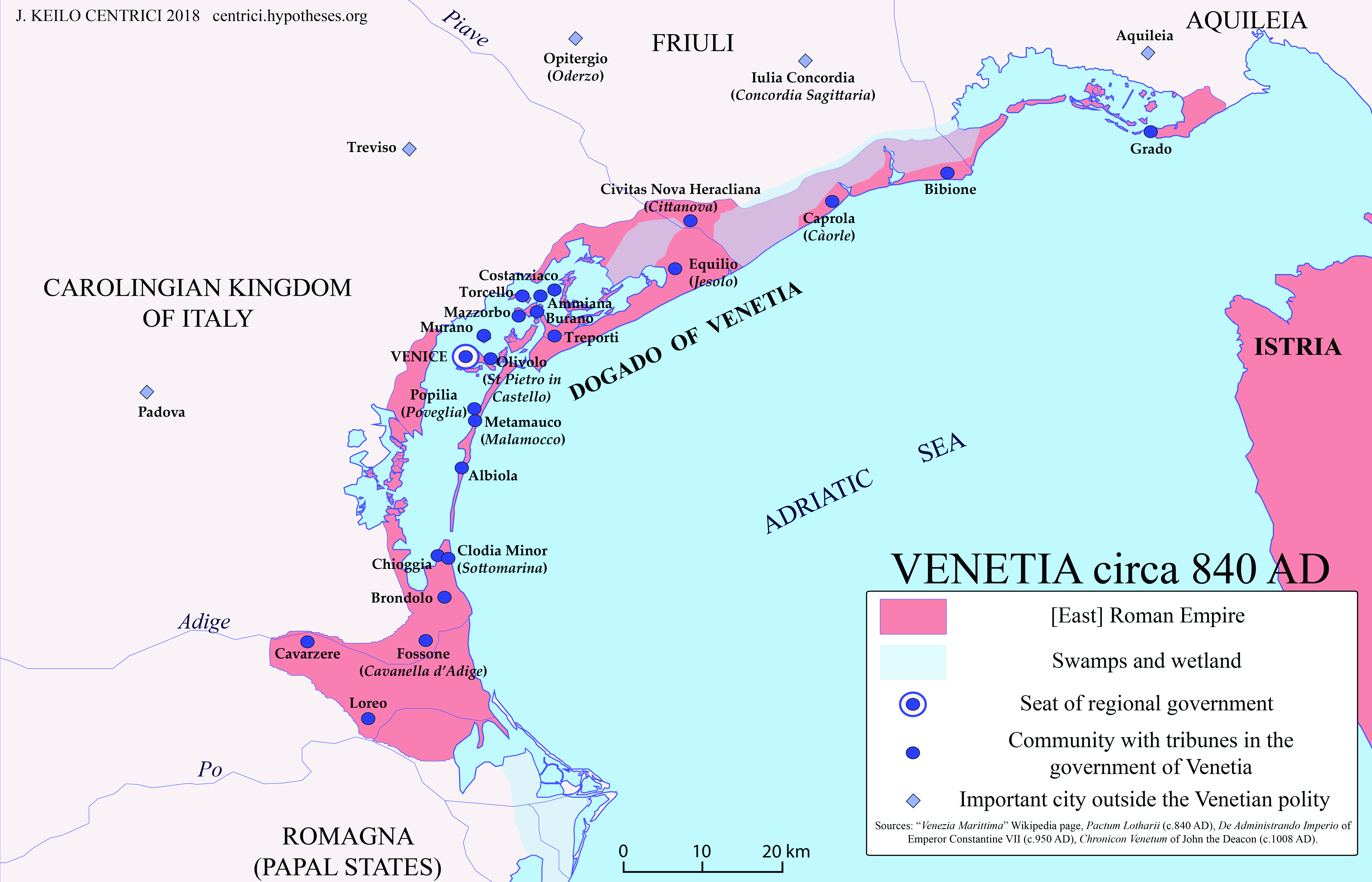
The Venetia c 840 AD

During the reign of the successor of the Participazio, Pietro Tradonico, Venice began to establish its military might which would influence many a later crusade and dominate the Adriatic for centuries, and signed a trade agreement with the Holy Roman Emperor Lothair I, whose privileges were later expanded by Otto I. Tradonico secured the sea by fighting Narentine and Saracen pirates. Tradonico's reign was long and successful (837 – 864), but he was succeeded by the Participazio and it appeared that a dynasty might finally be established.

In the pactum Lotharii of 840 between Venice and the Carolingian Empire, Venice promised not to buy Christian slaves in the Empire, and not to sell Christian slaves to Muslims. The Venetians subsequently began to sell Slavs and other Eastern European non-Christian slaves in greater numbers. The Venetian slave trade was divided in to several routes, such as the Balkan slave trade and the Black Sea slave trade. Caravans of slaves traveled from Eastern Europe, through Alpine passes in Austria, to reach Venice. Surviving records valued female slaves at a tremissa (about 1.5 grams of gold or roughly 1/3 of a dinar) and male slaves, who were more numerous, at a saiga (which is much less). Eunuchs were especially valuable, and "castration houses" arose in Venice, as well as other prominent slave markets, to meet this demand.

Around 841, the Republic of Venice sent a fleet of 60 galleys (each carrying 200 men) to assist the Byzantines in driving the Arabs from Crotone, but failed.

Under Pietro II Candiano, Istrian cities signed an act of devotion to the Venetian rule. His father (Pietro Candiano I) attempted to attack and destroy Marania or Pagania or Narentines and secure safe passage to Venetian fleets and treaders near Croatian Dalmatia . On 887 September 18, Candiano was captured by the Admiral of the Maranium Navy and killed. He was the first and only Duke of Venice to lose his life in an attempt to secure the Dalmatian Coast to Venice. The autocratic, philo-Imperial Candiano dynasty was overthrown by a revolt in 972, and the populace elected doge Pietro I Orseolo; however, his conciliating policy was ineffective, and he resigned in favor of Vitale Candiano.

Starting from Pietro II Orseolo, who reigned from 991, attention towards the mainland was definitely overshadowed by a strong push towards control of Adriatic Sea. Inner strife was pacified, and trade with the Byzantine Empire boosted by the favorable treaty (Grisobolus or Golden Bull) with Emperor Basil II. The imperial edict granted Venetian traders freedom from taxation paid by other foreigners and the Byzantines themselves.

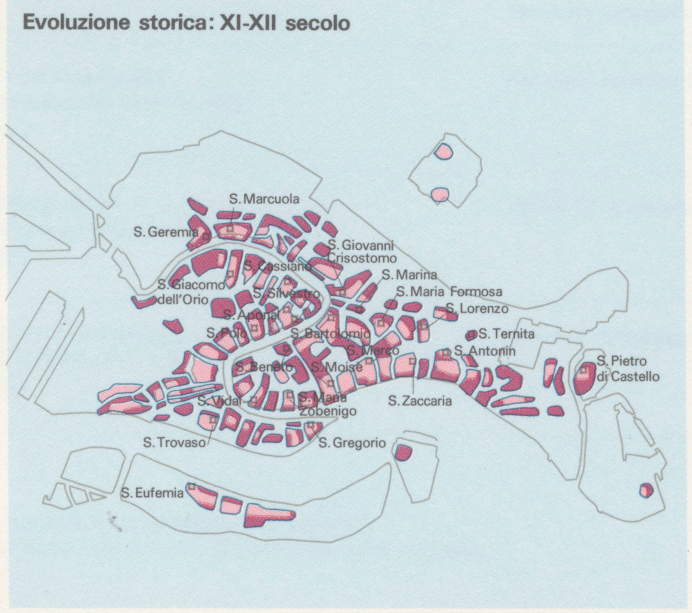
The city of Venice in XI-XII centuries

On Ascension Day in 1000 a powerful fleet sailed from Venice to resolve the problem of the Narentine pirates. The fleet visited all the main Istrian and Dalmatian cities, whose citizens, exhausted by the wars between the Croatian king Svetislav and his brother Cresimir, swore an oath of fidelity to Venice. the Main Narentine harbours (Lagosta, Lissa and Curzola) tried to resist, but they were conquered and destroyed (see: battle of Lastovo). The Narentine pirates were suppressed permanently and disappeared. Dalmatia formally remained under Byzantine rule, but Orseolo became "Dux Dalmatie" (Duke of Dalmatia"), establishing the prominence of Venice over the Adriatic Sea. The "Marriage of the Sea" ceremony was established in this period. Orseolo died in 1008.

Venice's control over the Adriatic was strengthened by an expedition by Pietro's son Ottone in 1017, by which time Venice had assumed a key role in balancing power between the Byzantine and Holy Roman Empires.

During the long Investiture Controversy, an 11th-century dispute between Henry IV, Holy Roman Emperor and Pope Gregory VII over who would control appointments of church officials, Venice remained neutral, and this caused some attrition of support from the Popes. Doge Domenico Selvo intervened in the war between the Normans of Apulia and the Byzantine Emperor Alexios I Komnenos in favor of the latter, obtaining in exchange a bull declaring the Venetian supremacy in the Adriatic coast up to Durazzo, as well as the exemption from taxes for his merchants in the whole Byzantine Empire, a considerable factor in the city-state's later accumulation of wealth and power serving as middlemen for the lucrative spice and silk trade that funnelled through the Levant and Egypt along the ancient Kingdom of Axum and Roman-Indian routes via the Red Sea.

The war was not a military success, but with that act the city gained total independence. In 1084, Domenico Selvo led a fleet against the Normans, but he was defeated and lost 9 great galleys, the largest and most heavily armed ships in the Venetian navy.

== High Middle Ages ==
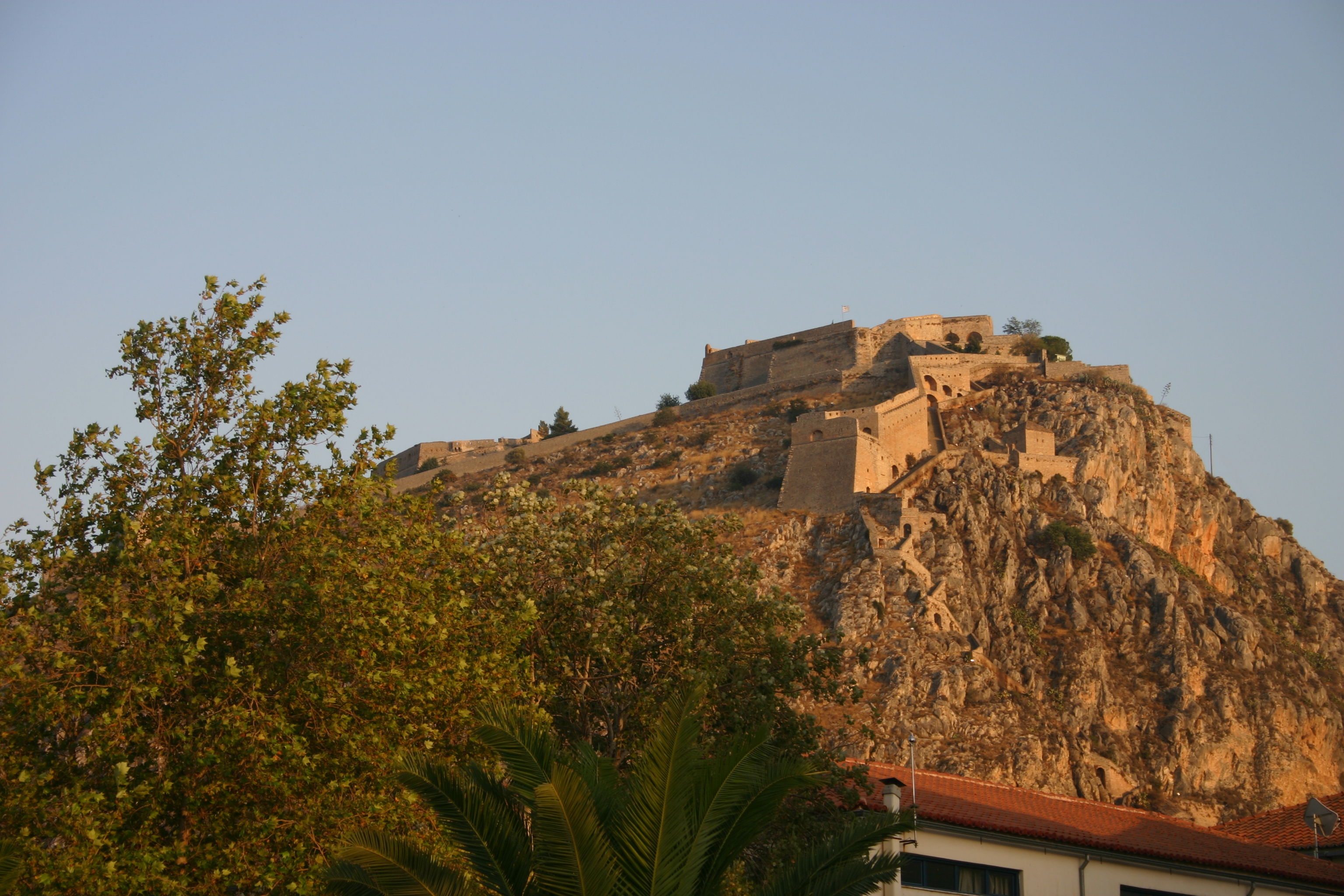
The Venetian fort in Nafplion, Greece. This is one of the many forts that secured the Venetian trade routes in the Eastern Mediterranean.

In the High Middle Ages, Venice became wealthy through its control of trade between Europe and the Levant, and began to expand into the Adriatic Sea and beyond. Venice was involved in the Crusades almost from the very beginning; 200 Venetian ships assisted in capturing the coastal cities of Syria after the First Crusade, and in 1123 they were granted virtual autonomy in the Kingdom of Jerusalem through the Pactum Warmundi. In 1110, Ordelafo Faliero personally commanded a Venetian fleet of 100 ships to assist Baldwin I of Jerusalem in capturing the city of Sidon.

In the 12th century, the republic built a large national shipyard that is now known as the Venetian Arsenal. Building new and powerful fleets, the republic took control over the eastern Mediterranean. The first exchange business in the world was started in Venezia, to support merchants from all over Europe. The Venetians also gained extensive trading privileges in the Byzantine Empire, and their ships often provided the Empire with a navy. In 1182 there was an anti-Catholic massacre by the Orthodox Christian population of Constantinople, with the Venetians as the main targets.

=== The rise of Venetian power ===
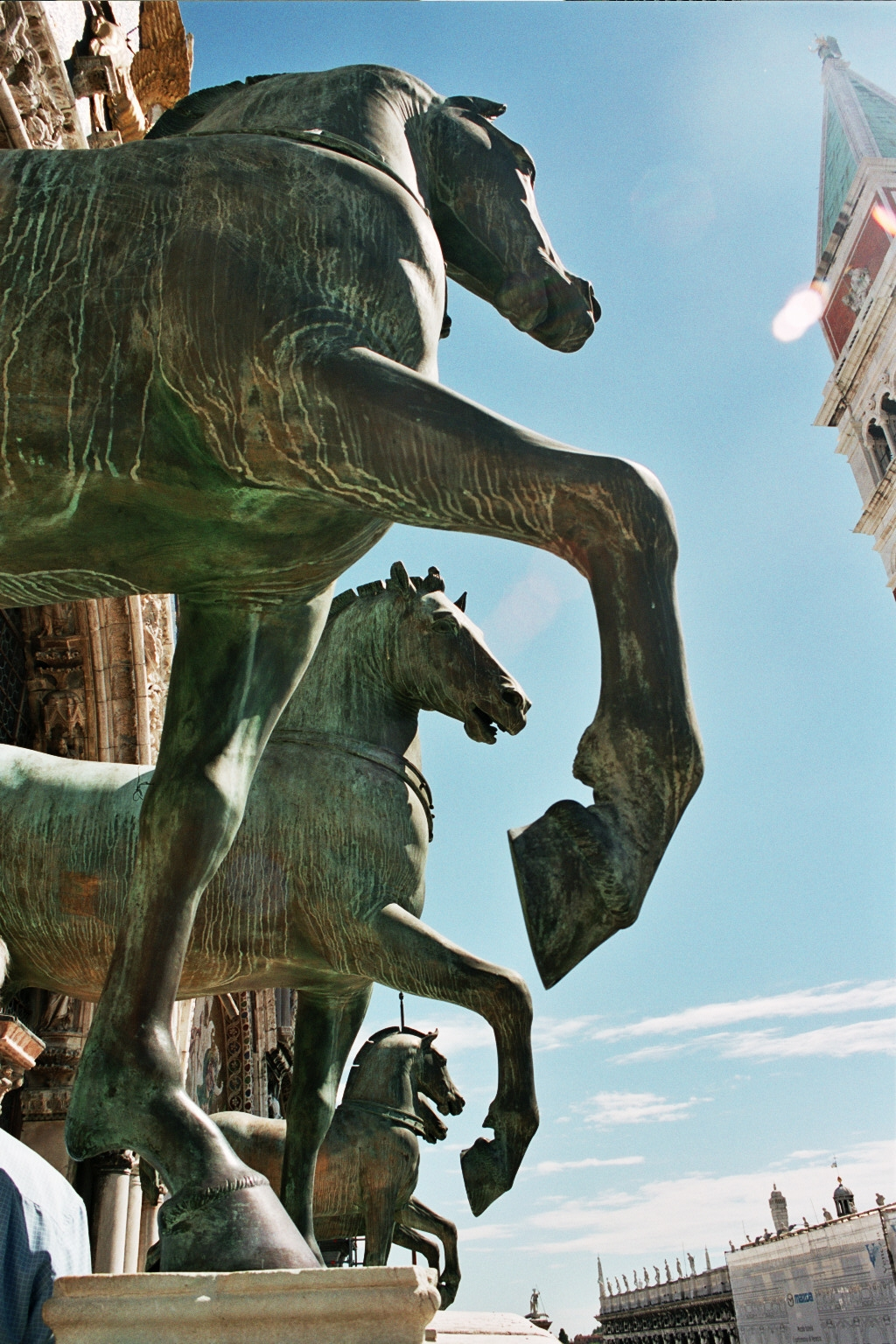
Horses of Saint Mark, brought as loot from Constantinople in 1204.

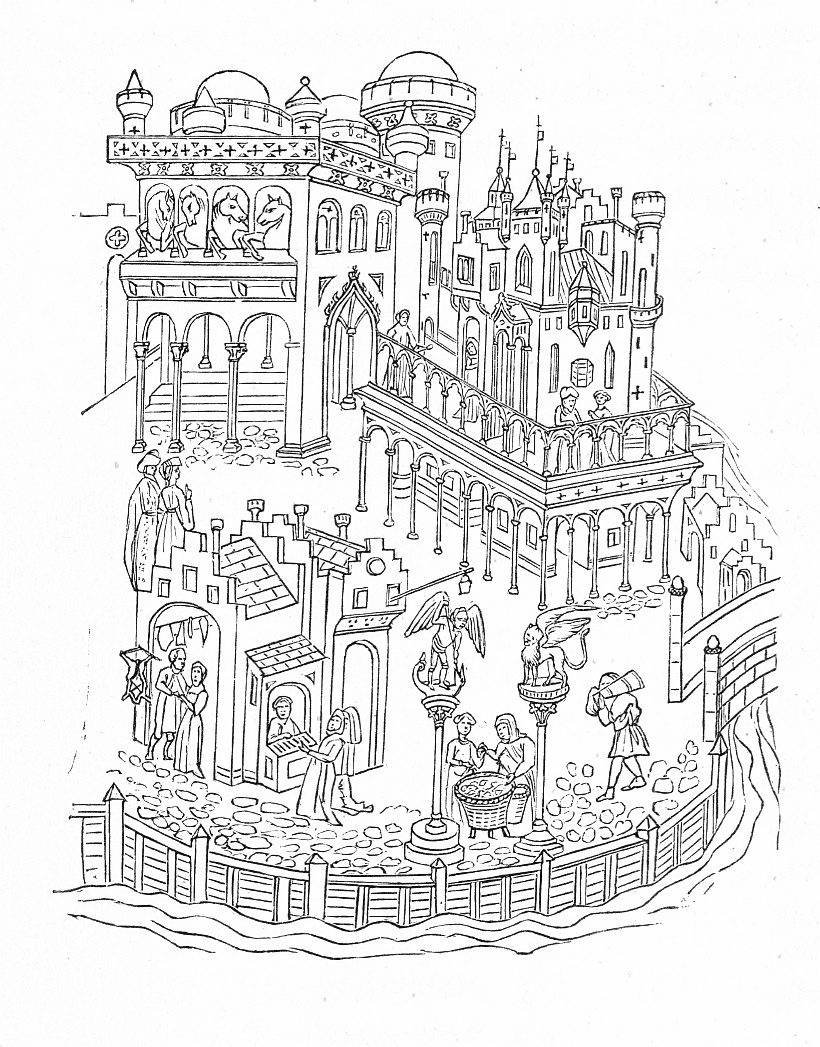
Drawing of the Doge's Palace, late 14th century

Venice was asked to provide transportation for the Fourth Crusade, but when the crusaders could not pay for chartering their shipping, the doge Enrico Dandolo offered to delay the payment in exchange for their aid in recapturing Zara (today Zadar), which had rebelled against Venetian rule in 1183, placing itself under the dual protection of the Papacy and King Emeric of Hungary, and had proved too well fortified for Venice to retake alone.

Upon accomplishing this in 1202, the crusade was again diverted to Constantinople, the capital of the Byzantine Empire. After being deposed from power, Alexios IV Angelos offered to the Crusaders 10,000 Byzantine soldiers to help fight in the Crusade, maintain 500 knights in the Holy Land, the service of the Byzantine navy (20 ships) in transporting their army to Egypt, and 200,000 silver marks to help pay off the Crusaders' debt to Venice if the Crusaders helped re-install him as emperor.

The Crusaders agreed and restored Alexios to power in 1203; however, he refused to hold up his end of the bargain. The Venetians and French crusaders responded by commencing a siege of Constantinople and in 1204, they captured and sacked the city. Venetians saved from the sack several artistic works, such as the famous four bronze horses and brought them back to Venice.

Byzantine hegemony was destroyed, and in the partition of the Empire that followed, Venice gained strategic territories in the Aegean Sea (three-eighths of the Byzantine Empire), including the islands of Crete and Euboea. Moreover, some present day cities, such as Chania on Crete, have core architecture that is substantially Venetian in origin. The Aegean islands formed the Venetian Duchy of the Archipelago.

The Republic of Venice signed a trade treaty with the Mongol Empire in 1241.

In 1295, Pietro Gradenigo sent a fleet of 68 ships to attack a Genoese fleet at Alexandretta, then another fleet of 100 ships were sent to attack the Genoese in 1299. In 1304, Venice fought a brief Salt War with Padua.

In the 14th century, Venice faced difficulties to the east, especially during the reign of Louis I of Hungary. In 1346 he made a first attempt to free Zara from Venetian suzerainty, but was defeated. In 1356 an alliance was formed by the counts of Gorizia, Francesco I da Carrara, lord of Padua, Nicolaus, patriarch of Aquileia and his half brother emperor Charles IV, Louis I, and the dukes of Austria. The league's troops occupied Grado and Muggia (1356), while Louis stripped Venice of Dalmatia.

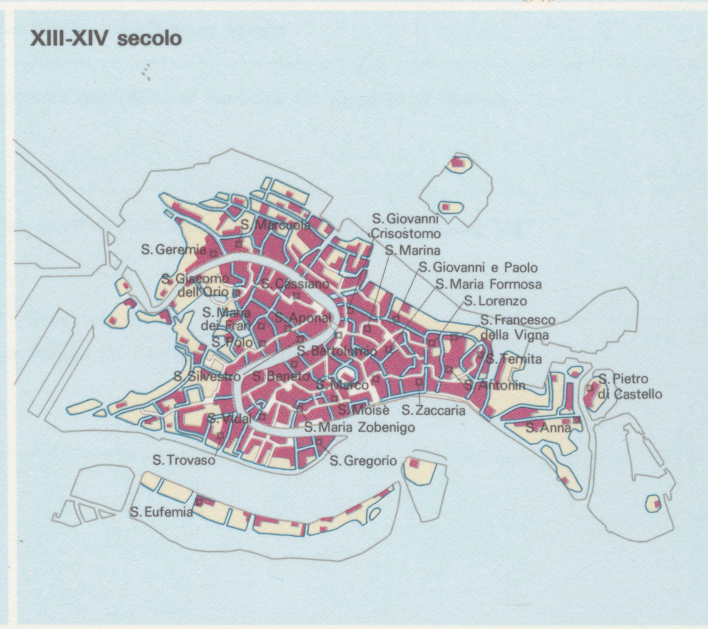
The city of Venice in XIII and XIV centuries

Along the Dalmatian coast, his army had attacked the Dalmatian cities of Zara, Traù, Spalato and Ragusa. The siege of Treviso (July–September 1356) was a failure. Venice suffered a severe defeat at Nervesa (13 January 1358), being forced to withdraw from Dalmatia and give it again to the Kingdom of Hungary. Venetians resigned themselves to the unfavorable conditions stipulated in the Treaty of Zara, which was signed on February 18, 1358.

From 1350 to 1381, Venice also fought an intermittent war with the Genoese. Initially defeated, the Venetians destroyed the Genoese fleet at the Battle of Chioggia in 1380 and retained their prominent position in eastern Mediterranean affairs at the expense of Genoa. However, the peace caused Venice to lose several territories to other participants to the war: Conegliano was occupied by the Austrians; Treviso was taken over by Carraresi; Tenedos fell to the Byzantine Empire; Trieste fell to the Patriarchate of Aquileia; and the Serenissima lost control of Dalmatia to Hungary.

In 1363, a colonial revolt broke out in Crete that needed considerable military force and five years to suppress.

== 15th century ==
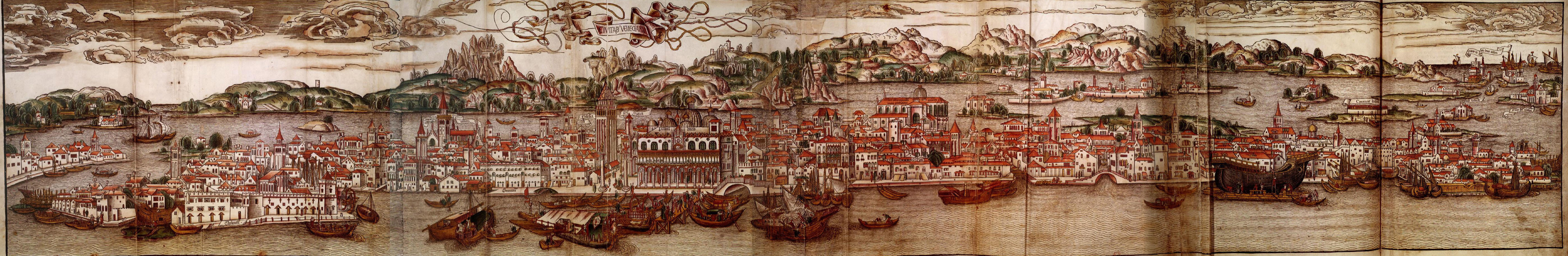
Map of Venice, 15th century; Page from the travelling guide of Bernhard of Breidenbach:Sanctae peregrinationes, illustrated and printed in Mainz by Erhard Reuwich, 11 February 1486

In the early 15th century, the Venetians further expanded their possessions in Northern Italy, and assumed the definitive control of the Dalmatian coast, which was acquired from Ladislaus of Naples. Venice installed its own noblemen to govern the area, for example, Count Filippo Stipanov in Zara. This move by the Venetians was in response to the threatened expansion of Giangaleazzo Visconti, Duke of Milan. Control over the north-east cross-country routes was also needed to ensure the safety of travelling merchants. By 1410, Venice had a navy of some 3,300 ships (manned by 36,000 men) and had taken over most of Venetia, including such important cities as Verona and Padua.

The situation in Dalmatia was settled in 1408 by a truce with Sigismund of Hungary. When this expired, Venice immediately invaded the Patriarchate of Aquileia, and subjugated Traù, Spalato, Durazzo, and other Dalmatian cities. The difficulties of Hungary allowed the Republic to consolidate its Adriatic dominions.

Under doge Francesco Foscari (1423–57) the city reached the height of its power and territorial extent. In 1425 a new war broke out, this time against Filippo Maria Visconti of Milan. The victory at the Battle of Maclodio of Count of Carmagnola, commander of the Venetian army, resulted in the shift of the western border from the Adige to the Adda. However, such territorial expansion was not welcome everywhere in Venice; tension with Milan remained high, and in 1446 the Republic had to fight another alliance, formed by Milan, Florence, Bologna, and Cremona. After an initial Venetian victory under Micheletto Attendolo at Casalmaggiore, however, Visconti died and a republic was declared in Milan. The Serenissima had then a free hand to occupy Lodi and Piacenza, but was halted by Francesco Sforza; later, Sforza and the Doge allied to allow Sforza the rule of Milan, in exchange for the cession of Brescia and Vicenza. Venice, however, again changed side when the power of Sforza seemed to become excessive: the intricate situation was settled with the Peace of Lodi (1454), which confirmed the area of Bergamo and Brescia to the Republic. At this time, the territories under the Serenissima included much of the modern Veneto, Friuli, the provinces of Bergamo, Cremona and Trento, as well as Ravenna, Istria, and Dalmatia. Eastern borders were with the county of Gorizia and the ducal lands of Austria, while in the south was the Duchy of Ferrara. Oversea dominions included Euboea and Egina.

Venetian possessions in the Eastern Mediterranean, 1450

On May 29, 1453 Constantinople fell to the Ottomans, but Venice managed to maintain a colony in the city and some of the former trade privileges it had had under the Byzantines. Indeed, in 1454, the Ottomans granted the Venetians their ports and trading rights. Despite the recent Ottoman defeats by John Hunyadi of Hungary and by Skanderbeg in Albania, war was unavoidable. In 1463 the Venetian fortress of Argos was ravaged. Venice set up an alliance with Matthias Corvinus of Hungary and attacked the Greek islands by sea and Bulgaria by land. The allies were forced to retreat on both fronts, however, after several minor victories. Operations were reduced mostly to isolated ravages and guerrilla attacks, until the Ottomans moved on a massive counteroffensive in 1470: this resulted in Venice losing its main stronghold in the Aegean Sea, Negroponte. The Venetians sought an alliance with the Shah of Persia and other European powers, but, receiving only limited support, could make only small-scale attacks at Antalya, Halicarnassus and Smirne.

The Ottomans conquered the Peloponnesus and launched an offensive in the Venetian mainland, closing in on the important centre of Udine. The Persians, together with the Caramanian amir, were severely defeated at Terdguin, and the Republic was left alone. Further, much of Albania was lost after Skanderbeg's death. However, the heroic resistance of Scutari under Antonio Loredan forced the Ottomans to retire from Albania, while a revolt in Cyprus gave back the island to the Cornaro family and, subsequently, to the Serenissima (1473). (Note: Cyprus became officially a territory of the Republic of Venice in 1489, after the abdication of the Cornaro and a treaty with the Egyptian sultan.) Its prestige seemed reassured, but Scutari fell anyway two years later, and Friuli was again invaded and ravaged. On January 24, 1479, a treaty of peace was finally signed with the Ottomans. Venice had to cede Argo, Negroponte, Lemnos and Scutari, and pay an annual tribute of 10,000 golden ducati. Five years later the agreement was confirmed by Mehmed II's successor, Bayezid II, with the peaceful exchange of the islands of Zakynthos and Kefalonia between the two sides.

In 1482 Venice allied with Pope Sixtus IV in his attempt to conquer Ferrara, opposed to Florence, Naples, Milan, and Ercole d'Este. When Papal-Venetian milices were smashed at the Battle of Campomorto, Sixtus changed side. Again alone, the Venetians were defeated in the Veronese by Alfonso of Calabria, but conquered Gallipoli, in Apulia, by sea. The balance was changed by Ludovico Sforza of Milan, who ultimately sided with Venice: this led to a quick peace, which was signed near Brescia on 7 August 1484. In spite of the numerous setbacks suffered in the campaign, Venice obtained the Polesine and Rovigo, and increased its prestige in the Italian peninsula at the expense of Florence especially. In the late 1480s, Venice fought two brief campaigns against the new Pope Innocent VIII and Sigismund of Austria. Venetian troops were also present at the Battle of Fornovo, in which the Italian League fought against Charles VIII of France. Alliance with Spain/Aragon in the following reconquest of the Kingdom of Naples granted it the control of the Apulian ports, important strategic bases commanding the lower Adriatic, and the Ionian islands.

Despite the setbacks in the struggle against the Turks, at the end of the 15th century, with 180,000 inhabitants, Venice was the second largest city in Europe after Paris and probably the richest in the world. The territory of the Republic of Venice extended over approximately 70,000 km^{2} (27,000 sq mi) with 2.1 million inhabitants (for comparison, at about the same time England had three million inhabitants, the whole of Italy 11 million, France 13 million, Portugal 1.7 million, Spain six million, and the Holy Roman Empire ten million).

Administratively the territory was divided into three parts:

1. the Dogado (the territory under the Doge), comprising the islets of the city and the original lands around the lagoon;
2. the Stato da Mar (the State of the Sea), comprising Istria, Dalmatia, the Albanian coasts, the Apulian ports, the Venetian Ionian Islands, Crete, the Aegean Archipelago, Cyprus and fortresses and trading posts around southeastern Europe and the Middle East;
3. the Stato di Terraferma (the State of the Mainland), comprising Veneto, Friuli, Venetia Iulia, East Lombardy and Romagna.

In 1485, the French ambassador, Philippe de Commines, wrote of Venice,

It is the most splendid city I have ever seen, and the one which governs itself the most wisely.

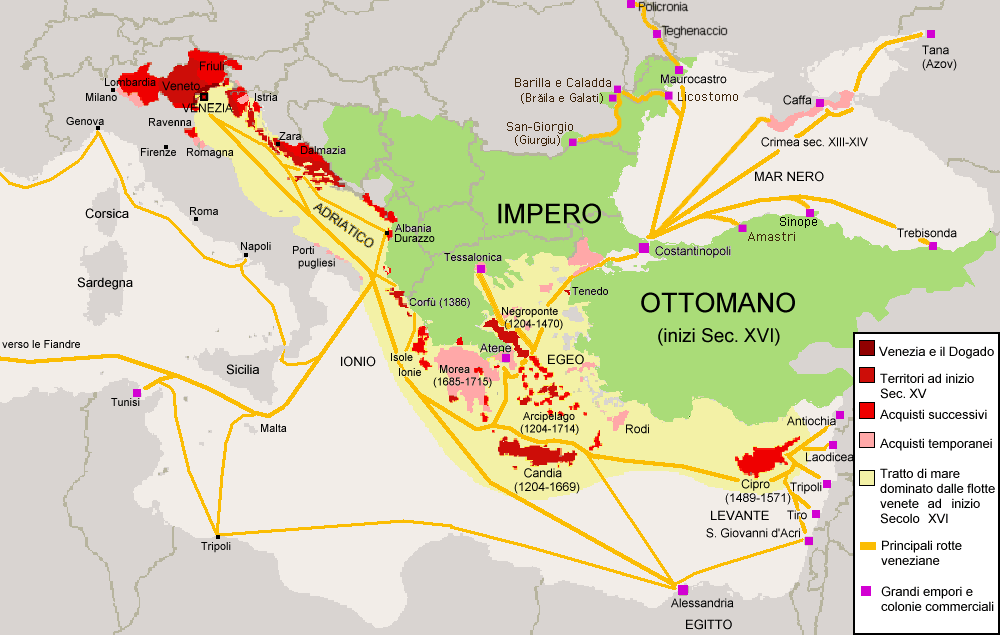
The territories of the Republic of Venice, superimposed over modern borders: in dark red, the territories conquered at the start of the 15th century; in red, the territories conquered at the start of the 16th century; in pink, the territories conquered temporarily; in yellow, the sea dominated by the Venetian fleet during the 15th century; the orange lines indicate the main routes and the purple squares are the main emporiums and commercial colonies.

== League of Cambrai, Lepanto and the loss of Cyprus ==
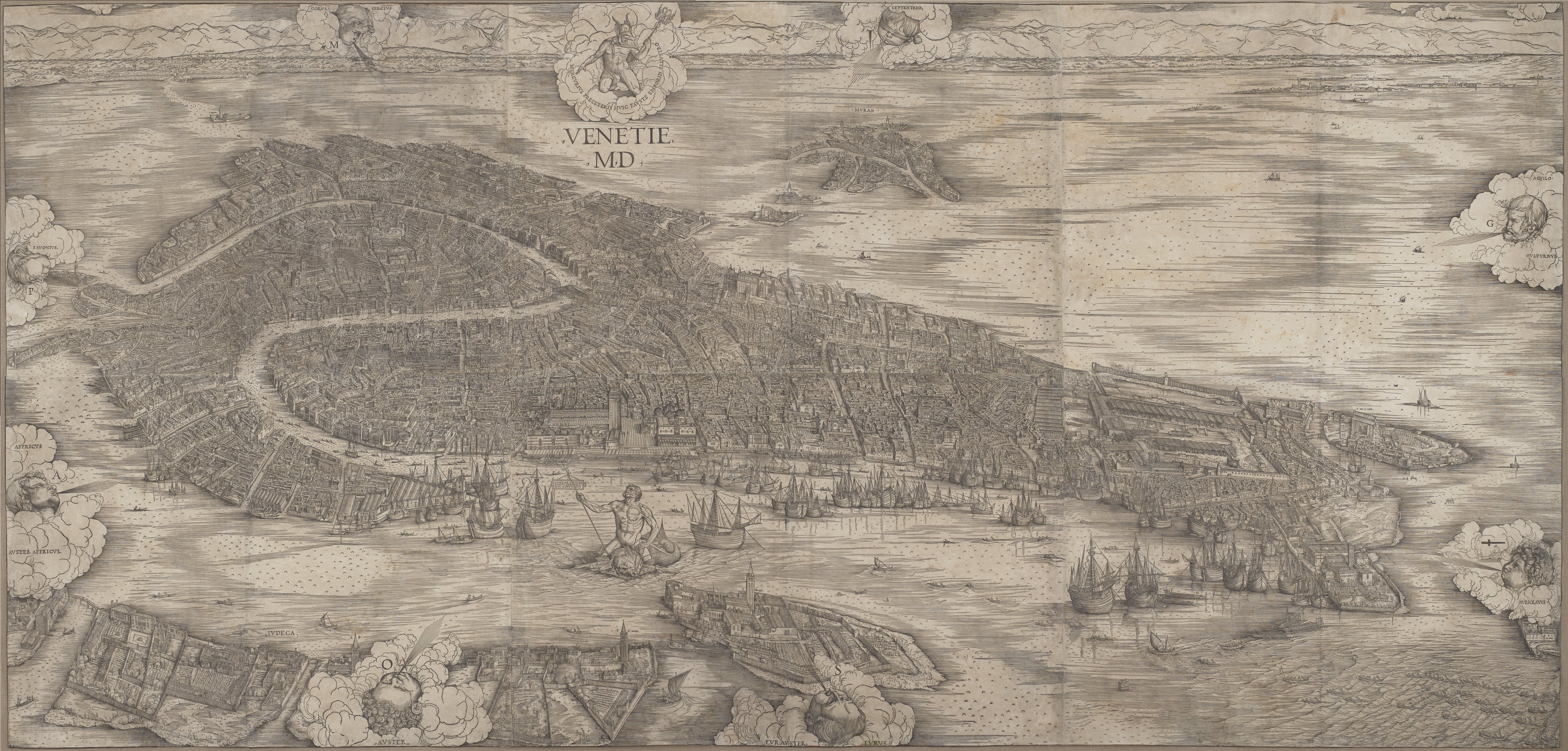
Jacopo de' Barbari's woodcut View of Venice, 1500

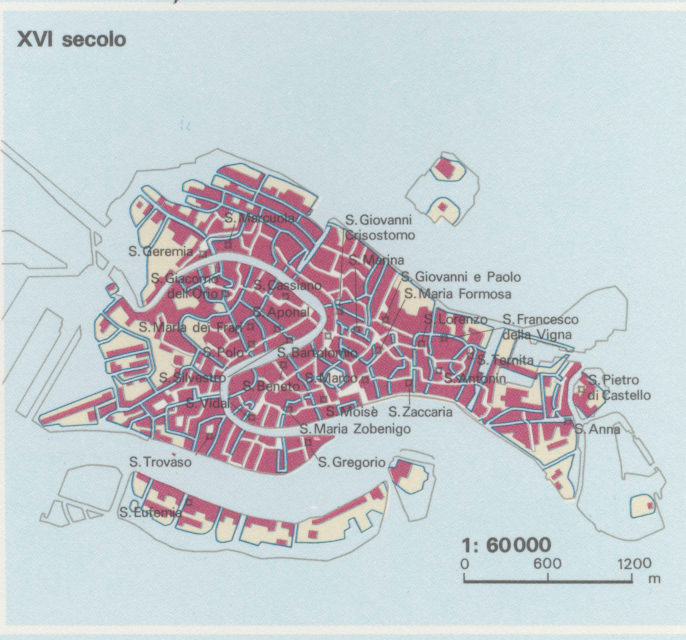
City of Venice in XVI century

In 1499 Venice allied with Louis XII of France against Milan, gaining Cremona. In the same year the Ottoman sultan moved to attack Lepanto by land and sent a large fleet to support the offensive by sea. Antonio Grimani, more a businessman and diplomat than a sailor, was defeated in the sea Battle of Zonchio in 1499. The Turks once again sacked Friuli. Preferring peace to total war against the Turks, Venice surrendered the bases of Lepanto, Modon and Coron.

Venice became rich on trade, but the guilds in Venice also produced superior silks, brocades, goldsmith jewelry and articles, armour and glass in the form of beads and eyeglasses. However, Venice's attention was diverted from its usual trade and maritime position by the delicate situation in Romagna, then one of the richest lands in Italy. Romagna was nominally part of the Papal States but effectively divided into a series of small lordships that were difficult for Rome's troops to control. Eager to take some of Venice's lands, all neighbouring powers joined in the League of Cambrai in 1508, under the leadership of Pope Julius II. The pope wanted Romagna, emperor Maximilian I Friuli and Veneto, Spain the Apulian ports, the king of France Cremona, the king of Hungary Dalmatia, and each of the others some part. The offensive against the huge army enlisted by Venice was launched from France. On 14 May 1509 Venice was crushingly defeated at the Battle of Agnadello, in the Ghiara d'Adda, marking one of the most delicate points of Venetian history. French and Imperial troops were occupying Veneto, but Venice managed to extricate itself through diplomatic efforts. The Apulian ports were ceded in order to come to terms with Spain, and Pope Julius II soon recognized the danger brought by the eventual destruction of Venice (then the only Italian power able to face large states like France or Ottoman Turkey). The citizens of the mainland rose to the cry of "Marco, Marco", and Andrea Gritti recaptured Padua in July 1509, successfully defending it against the besieging Imperial troops. Spain and the pope broke off their alliance with France, and Venice also regained Brescia and Verona from France. After seven years of ruinous war, the Serenissima regained her mainland dominions up to the Adda. Although the defeat had turned into a victory, the events of 1509 marked the end of the Venetian expansion.

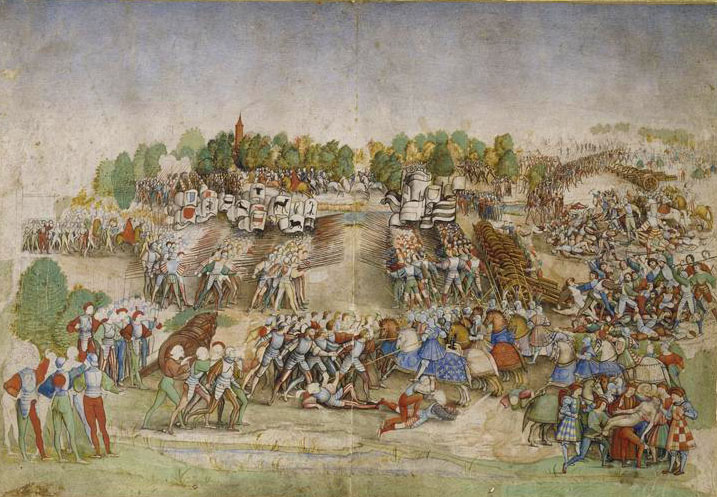
In 1515, the Franco-Venetian alliance decisively defeated the Holy League at the Battle of Marignano.

The Gasparo Contarini book De Magistratibus et Republica Venetorum (1544) illustrates the unique system of government in Venice and extols its various institutions. It also shows the astonishment of foreigners at the independence of Venice and its resistance to Italy's loss of freedom – and at it having emerged unscathed from the war against the League of Cambrai. Contarini suggested that the secret of Venice's greatness lay in the co-existence of the three types of government identified by Aristotle: monarchy, oligarchy, and democracy. In the opinion of Contarini, the Maggior Consiglio was the democratic part, the Senate and the Council of Ten were the oligarchy, while the doge represented monarchy. The combination of these three principles in the Venetian government came as close as possible to perfection in the mechanism of government. At the same time the patrician Marino Sanudo, a politician who had a remarkable career, and a celebrated diarist, was bemoaning the corruption resulting from the great number of poor or impoverished patricians.

The struggle for supremacy in Italy between France and Spain was resolved in favor of the latter. Caught between the Imperial-Spanish and Turkish superpowers, the Republic adopted a skilful political strategy of quasi-neutrality in Europe, which turned into a defensive stance against the Ottomans. Venice's maritime aid was potentially useful to Spain, but not to the point of allowing it to reinforce its position in the Levant, which would increase its strength in Italy as well, where it was practically the only Italian state not subject to Spain. In the Turkish war of 1537-40, Venice was allied with the Holy Roman Emperor and King of Spain, Charles V. Andrea Doria, commander of the allied fleets, was defeated at Preveza in 1538, and two years later Venice signed a treaty of peace by which the Turks took the Aegean duchy of Naxos from the Sanudo family. After Preveza the supremacy of the sea passed to the Ottomans.

The Battle of Lepanto in 1571

Difficulties in the rule of the sea brought further changes. Until 1545 the oarsmen in the galleys were free sailors enrolled on a wage. They were originally Venetians, but later Dalmatians, Cretans and Greeks joined in large numbers. Because of the difficulty in hiring sufficient crews, Venice had recourse to conscription, chaining the oarsmen to the benches as other navies had already done. Cristoforo da Canal was the first Venetian to command such a galley. By 1563, the population of Venice had dropped to about 168,000 people.

With the outbreak of another war with the Ottomans in 1570, Venice, Spain and the Pope formed the Holy League, which was able to assemble a grand fleet of 208 galleys, 110 of which were Venetian, under the command of John of Austria, half-brother of Philip II of Spain. The Venetians were commanded by Sebastiano Venier. The Turkish fleet, equal in number to the allied one, had sailed up the Adriatic as far as Lesina, and then returned to Lepanto in the Gulf of Patras for provisions. The Christian fleet had assembled at Messina and encountered the Turkish fleet off Lepanto on 7 October 1571. The Christians were victorious, and divided up 117 galleys captured from the Turks. But the Venetians gained no strategic advantage. Philip II was concerned with the balance of power in the eastern Mediterranean and Africa, and was unwilling for the fleet to become involved in the Levant. Famagusta, the last stronghold on the island of Cyprus, had been attacked by the Turks in 1570 and had surrendered before Lepanto. The Turkish commander, Lala Kara Mustafa Pasha, had had the Venetian provveditore Marcantonio Bragadin flayed alive. The loss of Cyprus was ratified in the peace of 1573. In 1575, the population of Venice was about 175,000 people, but dropped to 124,000 people by 1581.

== 17th century ==
In 1605 a conflict between Venice and the Holy See began with the arrest of two members of the clergy who were guilty of petty crimes, and with a law restricting the Church's right to enjoy and acquire landed property. Pope Paul V held that these provisions were contrary to canon law and demanded they be repealed. When this was refused, he placed Venice under an interdict. The Republic, under Doge Leonardo Donà, decided to ignore the interdict and excommunication, ordering local clergy to continue carrying out their ministries as before as if nothing had changed. It was supported by the Servite friar Paolo Sarpi, a sharp polemical writer who was nominated to be the Signoria's adviser on theology and canon law in 1606. The interdict was lifted after a year, when France intervened and proposed a formula of compromise. Venice was satisfied with reaffirming the principle that no citizen was superior to the normal processes of law.

A new war occurred in the years 1613–1617. The government of Venice wrote:

The whole house of Austria is displeased and disgusted at the just rule of the Most Serene Republic over the Gulf, and it appears to [us] that they are disturbing Venice's peaceful jurisdiction and possession with the frequent raids of the Uzkoks.

The Uzkoks (Italian: Uscocchi) were Christian refugees from Bosnia and Turkish Dalmatia who had been enlisted by the Austrian Habsburg to defend their borders after the peace between Venice and the Ottomans following the Battle of Lepanto. They settled in Segna and many lived as pirates in the Adriatic, causing concern in Venice that they would complicate relations with the Sublime Porte. When Venice acted against these Uscocchi in 1613, she found herself at odds on land with their protector, the archduke of Austria. An army was sent against Gradisca, an archducal possession, with financial support given to the duke of Savoy, who was pinning down the Spanish army in Lombardy. The military operations on the eastern frontier were not decisive, but the terms of peace in 1617 required the Habsburgs to solve the problem of the Uzkoks, who were moved inland.

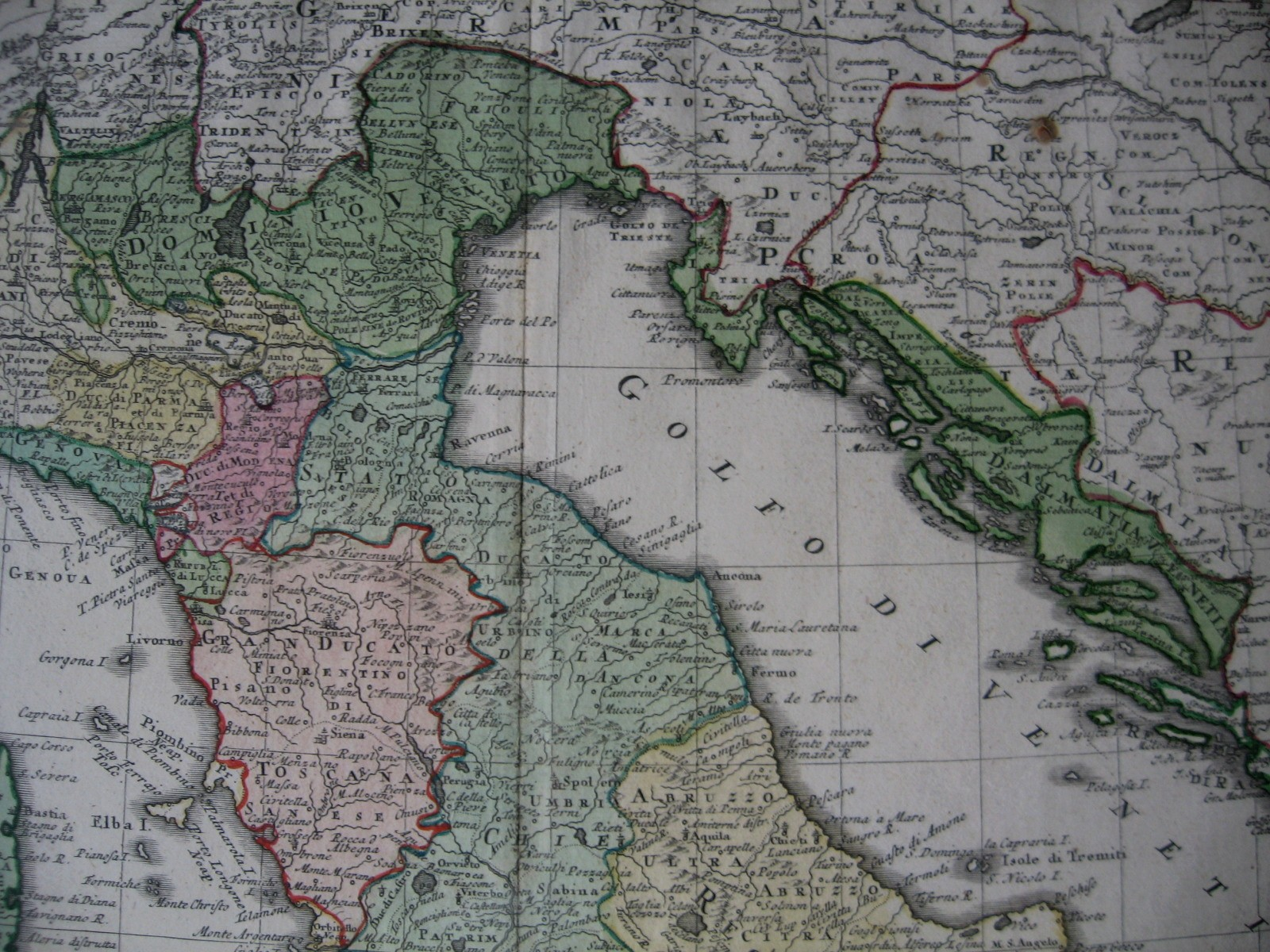
Republic of Venice in the early 18th century

In 1617, whether on his own initiative, or supported by his king, the Spanish viceroy of Naples, the Duke of Osuna attempted to break Venetian dominance. He sent a naval squadron to the Adriatic, leading to the Battle of Ragusa. Rumours of sedition and conspiracy were meanwhile circulating in Venice, and there were disturbances between mercenaries of different nationalities enrolled for the Uskok War. The allegations of the supposed Bedmar Conspiracy were against the Spanish ambassador, who left Venice, and others.

Tension with Spain increased in 1622, when Antonio Foscarini, a senator and ambassador to England, was accused of acting for foreign powers during his time as ambassador and of spying for Spain after his return. He was tried, acquitted of the first charge, found guilty of the second and hanged from a gallows between the columns of the Piazzetta in 1622. A few months later the Ten discovered that he had been the innocent victim of a plot. He was rehabilitated, and the news circulated around all the chancelleries of Europe.

In 1628 Venice was involved in Italian politics for the first time in more than a century. On the death of Ferdinando I Gonzaga, duke of Mantua and Montferrat, the succession devolved upon a French prince, Charles of Gonzaga-Nevers. This changed the balance of power in northern Italy, which had until now been controlled by the Spanish through Milan. In the ensuing war, Venice was allied with France against the Habsburgs and Savoy. The Venetian army was defeated in an attempt to come to the aid of Mantua, which was under siege by German troops, and Mantua itself was savagely sacked. The peace which recognized Charles of Gonzaga-Nevers as duke of Mantua and Monferrato was made practically without Venice's participation. War brought plague in 1630. In 16 months 50,000 people died in Venice, one third of the population. The first stone of the church of Santa Maria della Salute in the city was laid as a thanks offering for the end of the plague.

In 1638, while the Venetian fleet was cruising off Crete, a corsair fleet from Barbary consisting of 16 galleys from Algiers and Tunis entered the Adriatic. When the fleet returned, the corsairs repaired to the Turkish stronghold of Valona. The Venetian commander Marino Cappello attacked the corsairs, bombarded the forts and captured their galleys, freeing 3,600 prisoners. The sultan reacted to the bombardment of his fortress by arresting the Venetian bailo (ambassador) in Constantinople, Alvise Contarini. War was momentarily averted and the matter settled by diplomacy; however, six years later the Ottoman attack against Candia, the main Cretan port, left no easy terms to resort to. The Cretan War lasted for some 25 years and was the dominant question of the whole Republic's history in the 17th century.

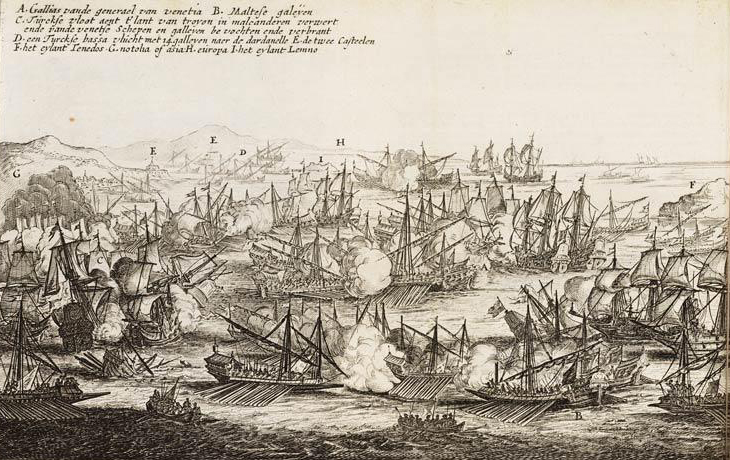
Battle of the Venetian fleet against the Turks at Dardanelles in 1656

War also moved to the mainland in the middle of 1645, when the Turks attacked the frontiers of Dalmatia. In the latter the Venetians were able to save their coastal positions because of their command of the sea, but on 22 August, the Cretan stronghold of Khania was forced to capitulate.

The greatest Turkish effort was directed against Sebenico, in today's Croatia, which was besieged in August–September 1647. The siege failed, and in the succeeding year the Venetians recovered several fortresses inland, such as Clissa. In Crete, however, the situation was more serious. Throughout all the war the Venetian strategy was to blockade the Dardanelles in order to surprise the Turkish fleet on its way to supply the troops on Crete. There were some signal successes, including two victories in the Dardanelles in 1655 and 1656, but they failed to alter the strategic situation. The next year there was a three-day-long sea-battle (17–19 July 1657), in which the captain Lazzaro Mocenigo was killed by a falling mast, and turning into a crushing defeat. With the end of the war between France and Spain in 1659, Venice received more aid from the Christian states than the small contingents which she had received in the first years. In 1666 an expedition to retake Khania failed, and in 1669 another attempt to lift the siege of Candia with joint action on land with the French contingent and by sea under Mocenigo also turned out to be a failure. The French returned home, and only 3,600 fit men were left in the fortress of Candia. Captain Francesco Morosini negotiated its surrender on 6 September 1669. The island of Crete was ceded, except for some small Venetian bases, while Venice retained the islands of Tinos and Cerigo, and its conquests in Dalmatia.

In 1684, soon after the Turkish defeat in the siege of Vienna, Venice entered an alliance, the Holy League, with Austria against the Ottomans; Russia was later included. At the beginning of the Morean War (1684–99) Francesco Morosini occupied the island of Levkas and set out to recapture the Greek ports. Between June 1685, when he landed at Corone, and August, when he occupied Patras, Lepanto and Corinth, he secured the Peloponnese for Venice. In September, during the attack on Athens, a Venetian cannon blew up the Parthenon. Venetian possessions were greatly increased in Dalmatia too, although the attempt to regain Negropont in 1688 was a failure. Morosini's successors failed to obtain lasting results in the next years, although large fleets were sent out, and in spite of some brilliant victories — at Mitylene in 1695, Andros in 1697 and the Dardanelles in 1698. The Treaty of Karlowitz (1699) favoured Austria and Russia more than Venice, which failed to regain its bases in the Mediterranean taken by the Turks in the previous two centuries, in spite of its conquests.

New conflict was brewing over the question of the Spanish Succession. Both France and the Habsburg empire, attempted now to gain an active ally in Venice, despatching envoys with authority there in 1700. The Venetian government preferred to remain neutral rather than accept hypothetical advantages offered by interested parties. The Republic remained faithful to this policy of neutrality to the end, caught in unavoidable decline but living out its life in a luxury famous throughout Europe.

== Decline ==
Giovan Battista Tiepolo, Neptune offers the wealth of the sea to Venice, 1748–1750. This painting is an allegory of the power of the Republic of Venice, as the wealth and power of the Serenissima was based on the control of the sea.

In December 1714 the Turks declared war on the Republic, at a time when Venice's major overseas possession, the "Kingdom of the Morea" (Peloponnese), was "without any of those supplies which are so desirable even in countries where aid is near at hand which are not liable to attack from the sea".

The Turks took the islands of Tinos and Aegina, crossed the isthmus and took Corinth. Daniele Dolfin, commander of the Venetian fleet, thought it better to save the fleet than risk it for the Morea. When he eventually arrived on the scene, Nauplia, Modon, Corone and Malvasia had fallen. Lefkas in the Ionian islands, and the bases of Spinalonga and Suda on Crete which still remained in Venetian hands, were abandoned. The Turks finally landed on Corfù, but its defenders managed to throw them back. In the meantime, the Turks had suffered a grave defeat by the Austrians at Petrovaradin on 3 August 1716. New Venetian naval efforts in the Aegean and the Dardanelles in 1717 and 1718, however, met with little success. With the Treaty of Passarowitz (21 July 1718), Austria made large territorial gains, but Venice lost the Morea, for which her small gains in Albania and Venetian Dalmatia ("Linea Mocenigo") were little compensation. This was the last war of the Republic with Turkey.

The decline of Venice in the 18th century was also due not only to Genoa, Venice's old rival, but also to Livorno, a new port on the Tyrrhenian Sea created by the grand dukes of Tuscany and chosen as staging-post for British trade in the Mediterranean. Still more injurious were the Papal town of Ancona and Habsburg Trieste, a free port since 1719, in the Adriatic Sea, which no longer constituted a "Venetian Gulf". An eminent Venetian politician of the time declared, "Apart from the residue which is left to us, Ancona robs us of the trade from both the Levant and the West, from Albania and the other Turkish provinces. Trieste takes nearly all the rest of the trade which comes from Germany."

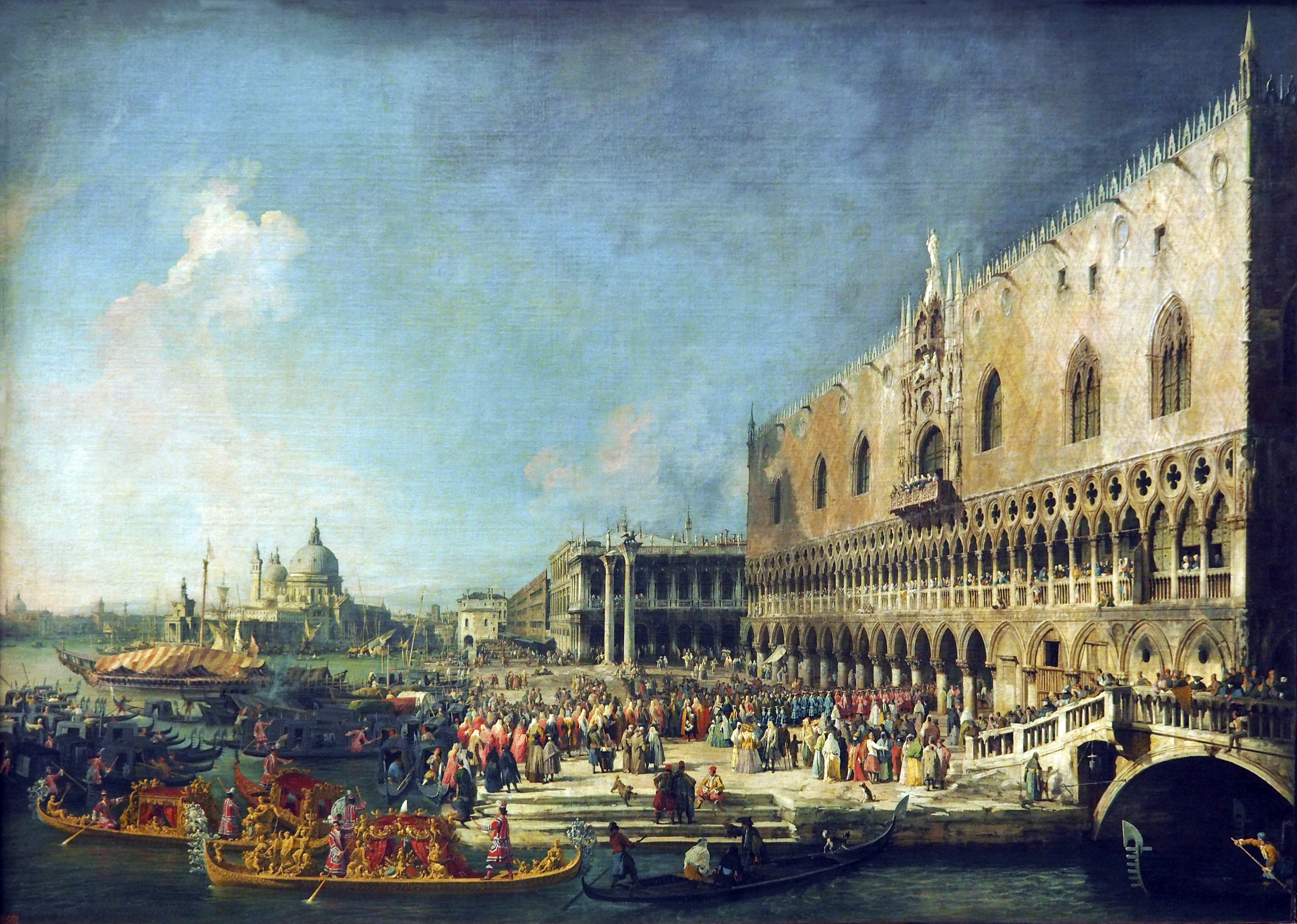
The Reception of the French Ambassador in Venice

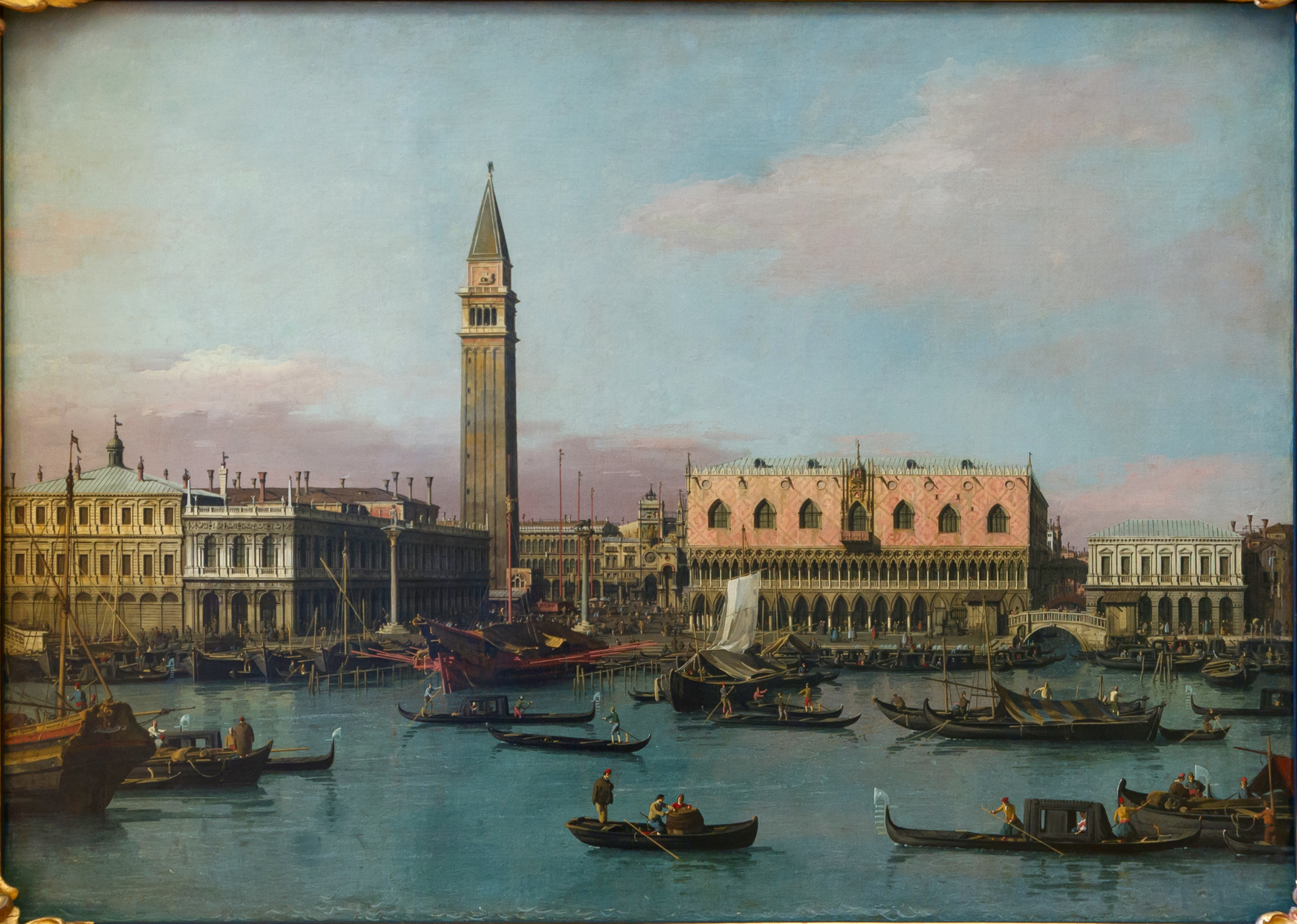
Venice in the 18th century

Even the cities of the eastern mainland up to Verona got their supplies from Genoa and Leghorn. The presence of pirates from the coast of Maghreb worsened the situation.

"All is in disorder, everything is out of control" exclaimed Carlo Contarini in the Maggior Consiglio on 5 December 1779. He was talking of a "commotion" in demand of a plan of reform also supported by Giorgio Pisani. The idea was to remove the monopoly of power enjoyed by the small number of rich patricians to the advantage of the very large number of poor ones. This gave rise to fears of "overturning the system" and the doge, Paolo Renier, opposed the plan. "Prudence" suggested that the agitations in favour of reform were a conspiracy. The Inquisitors took the arbitrary step of confining Pisani in the castle of San Felice in Verona, and Contarini in the fortress of Cattaro.

On 29 May 1784 Andrea Tron, known as el paron ("the patron") because of his political influence, said that trade:

is falling into final collapse. The ancient and long-held maxims and laws which created and could still create a state's greatness have been forgotten. [We are] supplanted by foreigners who penetrate right into the bowels of our city. We are despoiled of our substance, and not a shadow of our ancient merchants is to be found among our citizens or our subjects. Capital is lacking, not in the nation, but in commerce. It is used to support effeminacy, excessive extravagance, idle spectacles, pretentious amusements and vice, instead of supporting and increasing industry which is the mother of good morals, virtue, and of essential national trade.

The last Venetian naval venture occurred in 1784–86. The bey of Tunis' pirates renewed their acts of piracy following claims of compensation for losses suffered by Tunisian subjects in Malta, due to no fault of the Venetians. When diplomatic efforts to reach an agreement failed, the government was forced to take military action. A fleet under Angelo Emo blockaded Tunis and bombarded Sousse (November 1784 and May 1785), Sfax (August 1785 and March 1786), La Goletta (September 1785), and Biserta (July 1786). These brilliant military successes brought no comparable political results in their train, and the Senate recalled Emo and his fleet to Corfù. After Emo's death, peace was made with Tunis by increasing the bey's dues. By the year 1792, the once great Venetian merchant fleet had declined to a mere 309 merchantmen.

In January 1789 Ludovico Manin, from a recently ennobled mainland family, was elected doge. The expenses of the election had grown throughout the 18th century, and now reached their highest ever. The patrician Pietro Gradenigo remarked, "I have made a Friulian doge; the Republic is dead."

C. P. Snow suggests that in the last half century of the republic, the Venetians knew "that the current of history had begun to flow against them," and that to keep going would require "breaking the pattern into which they had crystallised." Yet they were "fond of the pattern" and "never found the will to break it."

== The fall of the Republic ==
The Republic of Venice in 1796, a year before its fall to the French

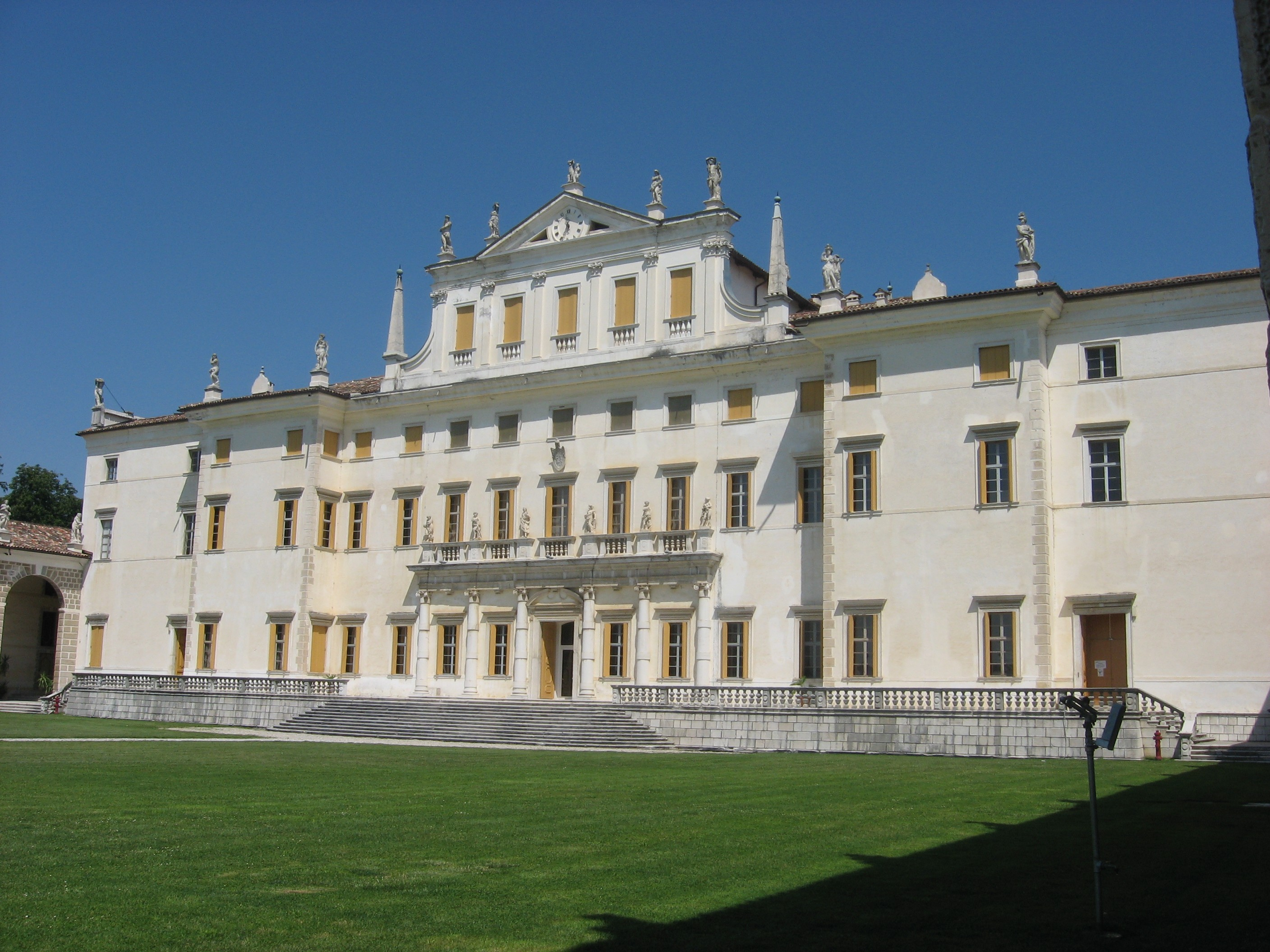
Villa Manin, in Passariano, where the Treaty of Campoformio was signed

By 1796, the Republic of Venice could no longer defend itself. Though the Republic still possessed a fleet of 13 ships of the line, only a handful were ready for sea, and the army consisted of only a few brigades of mainly Dalmatian soldiers. In spring 1796 Piedmont fell and the Austrians were beaten from Montenotte to Lodi. The army under Napoleon crossed the frontiers of neutral Venice in pursuit of the enemy. By the end of the year the French troops were occupying the Venetian state up to the Adige; Vicenza, Cadore and Friuli were held by the Austrians. With the campaigns of the next year, Napoleon aimed for Austrian possessions across the Alps. In the preliminaries to the Peace of Leoben, the terms of which remained secret, the Austrians were to take the Venetian possessions as the price of peace (18 April 1797).

Nevertheless, the peace envisaged the continued survival of the Venetian state, although confined to the city and the lagoon, perhaps with compensation at the expense of the Papal States. In the meanwhile Brescia and Bergamo revolted against Venice, and anti-French movements were rising elsewhere. Napoleon threatened Venice with war on 9 April. On 25 April he announced to the Venetian delegates at Graz, "I want no more Inquisition, no more Senate; I shall be an Attila to the state of Venice."

Domenico Pizzamano fired on a French ship trying to force an entry from the Lido forts. On 1 May, Napoleon declared war. The French were at the edge of the lagoon. Even the cities of the Veneto had been "revolutionized" by the French, who had established provisional municipalities. On 12 May, the Maggior Consiglio approved a motion to hand over power "to the system of the proposed provisional representative government", although there was not a quorum of votes: 512 voted for, ten against, and five abstained. On 16 May the provisional municipal government met in the Hall of the Maggior Consiglio. The preliminaries of the peace of Leoben were made even harsher in the treaty of Campoformio, and Venice and all her possessions became Austrian. The accord was signed at Passariano, in the last doge's villa, on 18 October 1797.

== See also ==
- History of the city of Venice
- Domini di Terraferma
- Timeline of the Venetian Republic
- Venetian Renaissance
- Republic of Pisa
- History of Italy
- Italian people
- Historical states of Italy
- History of Byzantine Empire
- Wars in Lombardy
- Ottoman wars in Europe
- Ottoman Navy
- Patriarchate of Aquileia
- Italian Wars
- Maritime Republics
- Marco Polo
- Napoleonic Wars
- The Tragedy of Othello, the Moor of Venice
- Treaty of Campoformio
- Veneto
- History of Friuli
- Istria
- Venetian Dalmatia
- Venetian Slovenia
- Venetian Albania
- Venetian Cyprus
- Medieval demography
- Naval history

== Sources ==
- Norwich, John Julius (1982). A History of Venice'. New York: Alfred B. Knopf. ISBN 9780394524108.
- Benvenuti, Gino (1989). Le repubbliche marinare. Rome: Newton Compton.
- Rendina, Claudio (1984). I dogi. Storia e segreti. Rome: Newton Compton.

== Bibliography ==
- Brown, Patricia Fortini. Private Lives in Renaissance Venice: Art, Architecture, and the Family (2004)
- Chambers, D.S. (1970). The Imperial Age of Venice, 1380-1580. London: Thames & Hudson. The best brief introduction in English, still completely reliable.
- Contarini, Gasparo (1599). The Commonwealth and Gouernment of Venice. Lewes Lewkenor, trans. London: "Imprinted by I. Windet for E. Mattes." The most important contemporary account of Venice's governance during the time of its flourishing; numerous reprint editions.
- Crowley, Roger (2011). City of Fortune: How Venice Won and Lost a Naval Empire. Faber & Faber.
- Ferraro, Joanne M. Venice: History of the Floating City (Cambridge University Press; 2012) 268 pages. By a prominent historian of Venice. The "best book written to date on the Venetian Republic." Library Journal (2012).
- Garrett, Martin. Venice: A Cultural History (2006). Revised edition of Venice: A Cultural and Literary Companion (2001).
- Grubb, James S. (1986). "When Myths Lose Power: Four Decades of Venetian Historiography." Journal of Modern History 58, pp. 43–94. The classic "muckraking" essay on the myths of Venice.
- Howard, Deborah, and Sarah Quill. The Architectural History of Venice (2004)
- Hale, John Rigby. Renaissance Venice (1974) (ISBN 0571104290)
- Lane, Frederic Chapin. Venice: Maritime Republic (1973) (ISBN 0801814456) standard scholarly history; emphasis on economic, political and diplomatic history
- Laven, Mary. Virgins of Venice: Enclosed Lives and Broken Vows in the Renaissance Convent (2002). The most important study of the life of Renaissance nuns, with much on aristocratic family networks and the life of women more generally.
- Madden, Thomas, Enrico Dandolo and the Rise of Venice. Baltimore: Johns Hopkins University Press, 2002. ISBN 978-0-80187-317-1 (hardcover) ISBN 978-0-80188-539-6 (paperback).
- Madden, Thomas, Venice: A New History. New York: Viking, 2012. ISBN 978-0-67002-542-8. An approachable history by a distinguished historian.
- Mallett, M. E., and Hale, J. R. The Military Organisation of a Renaissance State, Venice c. 1400 to 1617 (1984) (ISBN 0521032474)
- Martin, John Jeffries, and Dennis Romano (eds). Venice Reconsidered. The History and Civilization of an Italian City-State, 1297-1797. (2002) Johns Hopkins UP. The most recent collection on essays, many by prominent scholars, on Venice.
  - Drechsler, Wolfgang (2002). "Venice Misappropriated." Trames 6(2):192–201. A scathing review of Martin & Romano 2000; also a good summary on the most recent economic and political thought on Venice. For more balanced, less tendentious, and scholarly reviews of the Martin-Romano anthology, see The Historical Journal (2003) Rivista Storica Italiana (2003).
- Muir, Edward (1981). Civic Ritual in Renaissance Venice. Princeton UP. The classic of Venetian cultural studies; highly sophisticated.
- Rosand, David. (2001) Myths of Venice: The Figuration of a State. University of North Carolina Press; how writers (especially English) have understood Venice and its art
- Strathern, Paul. (2012) The Spirit of Venice: From Marco Polo to Casanova. Jonathan Cape.
- Tafuri, Manfredo. (1995) Venice and the Renaissance. MIT Press; architecture
- Wills. Garry. (2001) Venice: Lion City: The Religion of Empire. Simon & Schuster.
