= Baku Academy of Philosophy =

Baku Academy of Philosophy- “Bakı Fəlsəfə Akademiyası” (Aze.) is a platform that includes writings, video materials, articles, translations, publications and blogs in philosophy, art, humanities and many other fields in Azerbaijan, Baku.

== History ==
Baku Academy of Philosophy was established on April 16, 2020 by a group of young Azerbaijani researchers. The founders of the academy stated that the main goal of the platform is to reduce the lack of literature on philosophy in the Azerbaijani language. Since 2020, the platform has included various article translations, blogs and author posts. Baku Academy of Philosophy has translated 6 books into Azerbaijani and published them free of charge.

Baku Academy of Philosophy translated Paul Strathern's "Philosophy in 90 Minutes series" into Azerbaijani for the first time.

Baku Academy of Philosophy displayed about a series of 40 animated educational videos on YouTube channel of the academy.

The platform organizes special live broadcast programs, webinars and trainings on social networks every week, where experts in this field, including foreign philosophers, are invited to these projects. The motto of the academy is "philosophy for everyone".

== Publications in Azerbaijani ==
- 2020- "Nietzsche and Music" (Pierre Lasserre)
- 2021- "Socrates in 90 Minutes" (Paul Strathern)
- 2021- Plato in 90 Minutes (Paul Strathern)
- 2021- Aristotle in 90 Minutes (Paul Strathern)
- 2021- Confucius in 90 Minutes (Paul Strathern)
- 2021- Nietzsche in 90 Minutes (Paul Strathern)
- 2021- Schopenhauer in 90 Minutes (Paul Strathern)

== See also ==
- Azerbaijani philosophy
- Philosophy of Friedrich Nietzsche
