= Dogaressa Elena =

9th-century Italian noble

Elena

Dogaressa of Venice
- Reign: 811 - 827
- Predecessor: Carola
- Successor: Felicita
- Born: Byzantine Empire (?)
- Spouse: Agnello Participazio
- Issue: Giustiniano Participazio; Giovanni I Participazio

Elena was the Dogaressa of Venice by marriage to the Doge Agnello Participazio (r. 811-827 CE). She is believed to have been Byzantine. Her death date is unknown.

== Life ==
Elena commissioned the erection of Santa Giustina, Venice, situated in the Calle de Te Deum. Along with her husband Agnello and son Giustiniano Participazio, she founded the monasteries of Sant'Ilario and San Zaccaria, and she is believed to have been buried in the latter.

She was reputed to have an interest in cultivating flowers.

== Children ==
With Agnello, Elena had two sons:

- Giustiniano Participazio
- Giovanni I Participazio

Political offices
Preceded by Carola	Dogaressa of Venice	Succeeded by Felicita
