= Malamocco =

Human settlement in Italy

Coordinates: 45.3717°N 12.3383°E

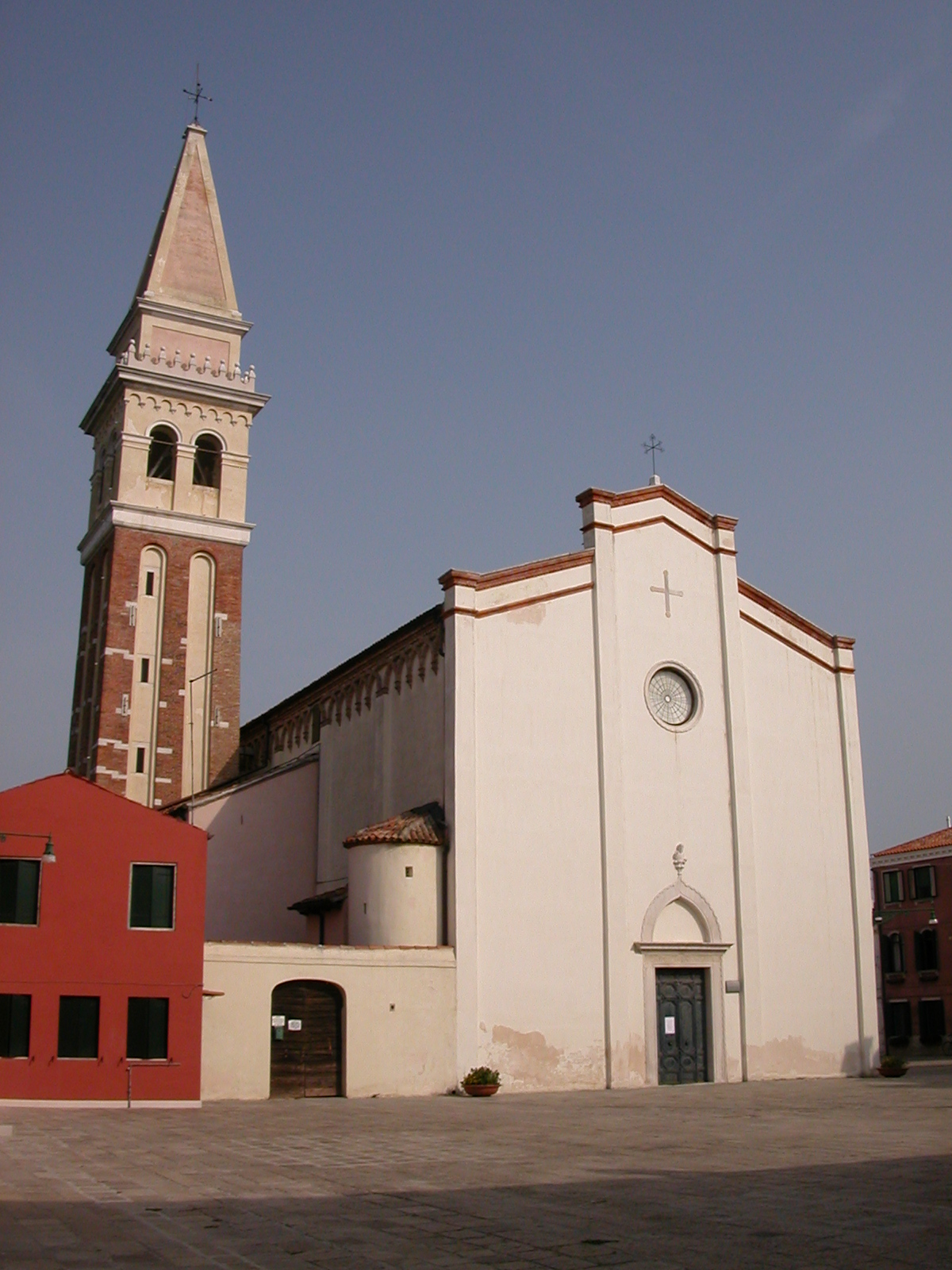
Santa Maria Assunta

Malamocco (Venetian: Małamoco) was the first, and for a long time, the only, settlement on Lido, a barrier island of the Venetian Lagoon. It is located just south of the island's center and it is part of the Lido-Pellestrina borough of the municipality of Venice.

== Metamaucum ==
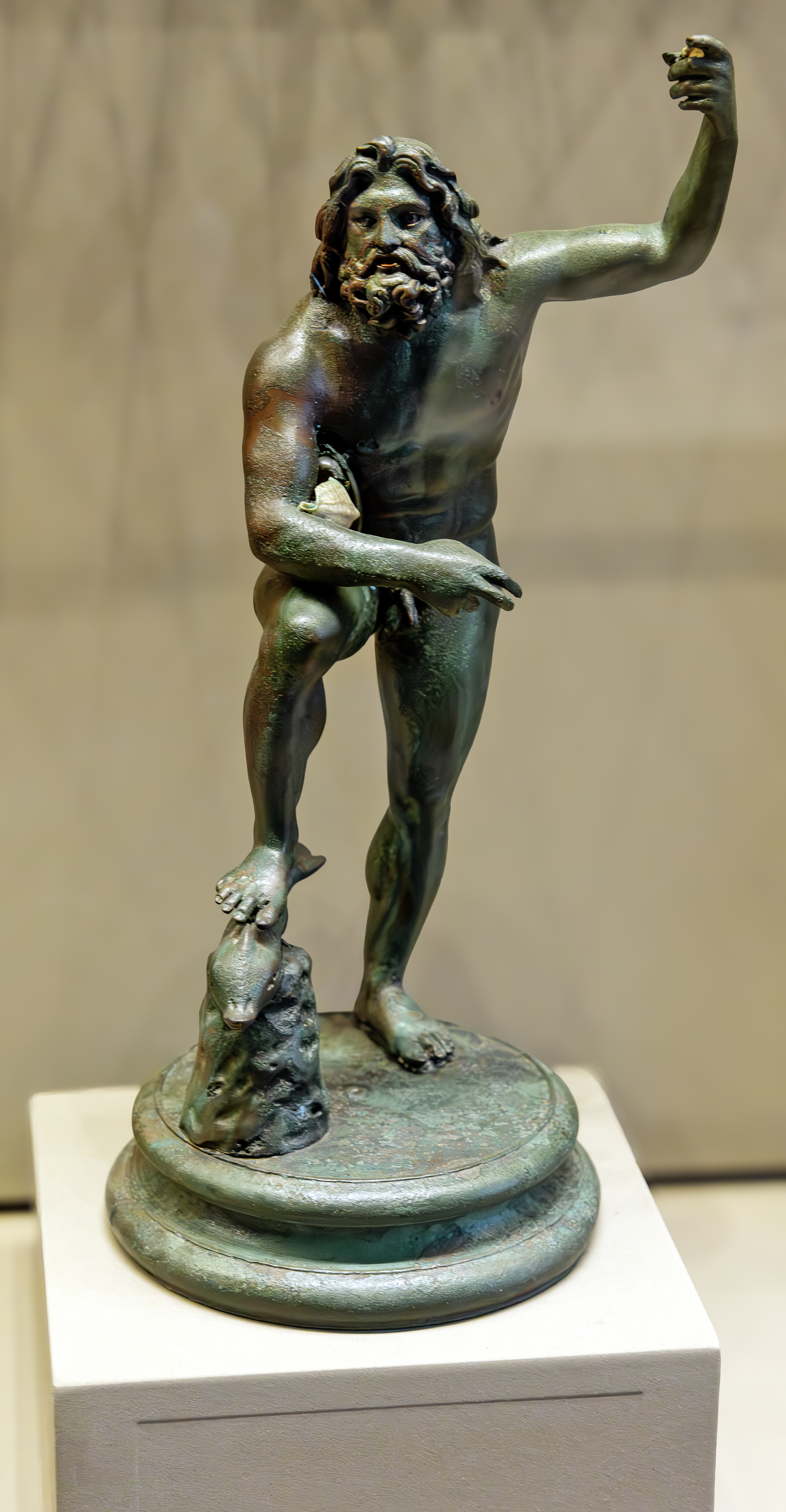
Poseidon Bronze - Correr Museum

Malamocco is sometimes misidentified as Metamaucum. This was one of the earliest settlements in the Lagoon of Venice. Its origins dated back to the Roman days. It was said to have acted as the port of Padua, to which it was connected by the River Medoacus Maior (today's Brenta). The name Metamaucus was derived from the Medoacus Maior. It is likely that its port received ships from Ravenna and that the via Popilia facilitated links with mainland towns.

Metamaucum became the second ducal seat of the duchy of Venice when Teodato Ipato (742–755), the second doge, transferred it from Heraclea, and remained the capital for the young republican D chy until811, when the doge Agnello Participazio (811–827) moved it to Rivoalto after the exile of the doge Obelerio. It was temporarily occupied by Pepin when he tried to invade the duchy in 810. It was destroyed by the doge Giovanni I Participazio (829–836) when he suppressed a rebellion by Obelerio, who returned from exile and had the support of Metamaucum. The settlement continued to be inhabited, but it was a shadow of its former self. This decline reached its peak when the priory was moved to the island of Murano in 1108, the S.S. Leone e Basso nuns moved to the island of San Servolo in 1109 and the seat of its diocese was moved to Chioggia between 1107 and 1110. In 1116 it was submerged as a result of an exceptional storm surge.

According to the tradition, Metamauco was on the seashore of the Lido island, rather than on its lagoon shore. Lanfranchi doubts that it faced the sea because at that time it was difficult to obtain the stones necessary to build effective sea defences such as dams and banks. He also notes that John the Deacon wrote that Metamaucus was "surrounded by a beautiful Lido", which implies that the town itself was not on the coast. There are still local rumours according to which it is possible to spot the ruins of the town when the sea is calm. The location of the town had not been found.

== Malamocco ==
A new settlement was built on the lagoon shore of Lido, close to where Metamaucum had been. The existence of a Metamaucum Nova, which corresponds to today's Malamocco, was first attested in 1107. It retained numerous privileges due to its connection with the former ducal town, but it became more and more peripheral. It was administered, together with the nearby island of Poveglia, by a podestà who represented the doge locally and was elected for a sixteen-month term. He was the head of a council of selected families which had the right to nominate local officials from 1339 to the fall of the Republic of Venice. It was one of nine districts of the Republic.

Between 1379 and 1381, Malamocco was involved in Venice's defensive works during the War of Chioggia.

From 1816 Malamocco was a municipality which covered the whole of the Lido island and it was its most populated centre. In 1933 the town was incorporated into the municipality of Venice. In the second half of the 19th century, the northern part of the island was developed for tourism and became the island's largest and most important centre.

With the creation of the Metropolitan Municipality of Venice in 2015, the Lido island became one of its seven boroughs. It is the borough of Lido-Pellestrina, also called Venezia Litorale.

Today Malamocco is a village with 1554 inhabitants. It has a parish church now devoted to Santa Maria Assunta, but was originally dedicated to Madonna della Marina, "Our Lady of the Sea". The church dates from the 12th century and is built in Veneto-Byzantine style. It underwent modifications in 1339 and 1557. It has one nave. There is a painting of the Assumption by Giulia Lama on the right wall. The sanctuary has the large 17th century Miracle in the Sea by Gerolamo Foscari and the sacristy has a rare 15th century altar front with the Dormition of the Virgin and 18th century statuettes of the Marys, St John and Mary Magdalen. There is a crucifix that might be a 12th or 13th century work form northern Europe. The bell tower is modelled on that of St. Mark's. It has a peal of four bells in the chord of F major, cast in 1803.

In the square outside the church, Campo della chiesa, there are two Venetian wells with high reliefs of the lions of St. Mark's and a 15th-century building, which was the Residenza della Deputazione Comunale, also has a high relief of the lion. There is a monument in hexagonal form with the Pisani family's coat of arms. The Pisani governed Malamocco around the middle of 1537.

The main street, rio Terà, is a filled in canal as the name indicates (rio = canal, terà = filled in). Further along there is Pazza delle Erbe, at the end of which there is an arch which precedes a brick bridge across a canal. Along the next road and across a wooden bridge there are the remains of a moated fortress. This might be the fortress in the story of the Madonna of Marina.

The story of the Madonna of Marina or of the del Soco (log) is about a Malamocco man who went to the foreshore to look for the low tide to release wood to burn. He found a soco, took it home and put it on the fire. It mysteriously disappeared. He went back to the foreshore and found it again twice. Both times it disappeared again. The third time the Virgin appeared and then disappeared. The villagers built a chapel, made a wooden statue of the Virgin and celebrated her on every second Sunday of July. In 1814 the Austrians built a fortress on its site. The villagers moved the statue to the church and continued the celebration. It is still there.

The disastrous flood of 1996 in the Lagoon of Venice also affected Malamocco. Between 1988 and 1993 works for defences against high tides were undertaken. Three underwater floodgates have been placed at the entrance of the three main canals of the village. They are raised when the tide reaches +80 cm above the average, blocking the lagunar waters. This provides protection from tides up to +163 cm. Between 2003 and 2009 the shores and banks were reinforced and a system for renewing the waters of the canals was put into place.

== Malamocco inlet ==
The name Malamocco also refers to one of the three inlets which connect the Venetian Lagoon to the Adriatic Sea. The inlets are called porto or bocca di porto. The porto di Malamocco is between Lido and Pellestrina, another barrier island. The other two are called porto del Lido, or di Lido San Nicolò, and porto di Chioggia. It is 380 m (1,250 ft) wide and it is the second widest inlet. It is 14 m (46 ft) deep and it is the deepest one. It is used by cargo ships which sail to the Marghera commercial/industrial port via the Malamocco-Marghera channel.

Due to silting at the Lido San Nicolò inlet, Venice dug the Santo Spirito channel from the Malamocco inlet to the St. Mark's basin to let bigger ships through. It was 14 m (46 ft) wide and 4 m (13 ft) deep. During Napoleonic rule this channel was widened to 28 m and deepened to 6.5 m (21 ft) to let warships through. Later in the 19th century, it was widened to 30–60 m (98–197 ft) and deepened to 9.5 m (31 ft). Between 1920 and 1925 the Vittorio Emanuele III channel (28 m (92 ft) wide and 9–10 m (30–33 ft) deep) was dug to connect the inlet to a new industrial area on the Giudecca island. It was widened to 50 m (160 ft) during World War I. It was deepened to 11 m (36 ft) in the 1950s. Between 1964 and 1968 a new channel was dug to the port of Marghera to divert naval traffic away from Venice and to develop a port for oil tankers in Marghera. It is called Malamocco-Marghera channel and has been nicknamed canale dei petroli (petroleum channel).

== The MOSE barrier at the Malamocco inlet ==
The MOSE project is a flood barrier system consisting of rows of mobile gates installed at the lagoon inlets which are raised during acqua alta high tides to temporarily isolate the lagoon from the Adriatic Sea.

The MOSE barrier at the Malamocco inlet has 19 gates 29.5 m (97 ft) long, 20 m (66 ft) wide and 4.5 m (15 ft) thick lodged in seven housing structures 60 m (200 ft) long, 48 m (157 ft) wide and 12.5 m (41 ft) high. Five of them have three gates and two smaller ones have two. A lock allows ships to pass through when the gates are raised. It is 380 m (1,250 ft) long and 50 m (160 ft) wide. It can accommodate ships up to 280 m (920 ft) long and 39 m (128 ft) wide. On the outside of the inlet there is a 1.28 km (0.80 mi) curved breakwater to slow down the sea currents and create a basin with calm waters to make it easier for ships to manoeuvre to access the lock.

The housing structures, 14 for the gates and 4 for the abutments, for the barriers of both the Lido San Nicolò and Malamocco inlets were built in a construction yard on a nearly 450 m long (1,480 ft) artificial island on the southern shore of the inlet. The structures were built on top of hundreds of concrete pillars in two perfectly aligned rows which kept them at a height of 2 m (6 ft 7 in). This allowed their transport. A system of 6 rows of rails and 84 carriages was put into place to carry their weight, which ranged between 16,000 and 22,500 tons. The rails were below each structure, in the space between the pillars. The structures were lowered into the sea at a speed of 10 centimetres per second (3.9 in/s). They then were floated, tied to an installation pontoon, dragged to their intended places and stabilised and ballasted so that they could be sunk with a system of cables and hoists.

== Bibliography ==
- Castagnetti, Andrea, Insediamenti e "populi" in Storia di Venezia | volume= Vol. 1 - Origini, Età ducale, Treccani, 1992
- D'Alpaos, Luigi, "Lo scavo dei grandi canali navigabili". Fatti e misfatti di idraulica lagunare. La laguna di Venezia dalla diversione dei fiumi alle nuove opere delle bocche di porto. Venezia: Istituto Veneto di Scienze, Lettere ed Arti, 2010; ISBN 978-88-95996-21-9.
- Distefano, Giovanni, Atlante storico di Venezia, Venezia, Supernova, 2008.
- Lanfranchi, Luigi Zille, Gian Giacomo, Il territorio del Ducato Veneziano dall'VIII al XII secolo, in Storia di Venezia, Vol. 2, Venezia, International Centre of Arts and Costume, 1958.

== See also ==
- History of the Republic of Venice
- MOSE Project
