= Carola, wife of Obelerio degli Antenori =

Dogaressa of Venice married to Doge Obelerio degli Antenori

Carola

1st Dogaressa of Venice
- Reign: 804 - 811
- Predecessor: Title Established
- Successor: Dogaressa Elena
- Died: after 811
- Spouse: Obelerio degli Antenori

Carola (fl. 811) is the name used by Edgecumbe Staley in his book The dogaressas of Venice to refer to the Dogaressa of Venice married to Doge Obelerio degli Antenori (r. 804-811).

Among many claims, she is sometimes purported to be the first consort of a Venetian doge with the title and position of dogaressa of Venice, although this is a claim that only appears for the first time in 1858, over 1,000 years after her supposed reign. The first mention of a consort of Obelerio in the surviving historical record is in the Chronicon Altinate, said to be an unnamed daughter of Charlemagne, and several other early accounts fail to mention any wife or consort of Obelerio. Despite the lack of contemporary evidence, the consort figure in the Chronicon Altinate became part of the canon of Venetian history, and thus is found in many accounts of Obelerio's reign.

== Life ==
According to Staley's book, regarded by modern scholars as a "fictional and fanciful" account of the dogaressas, Carola was originally a Frankish countess and a lady-in-waiting to the empress of Charles the Great. In Staley's narrative, she met Obelerio when he and his brother Beato visited the court of Charles in Aix-La-Chapelle. Charles gave his blessing to the union and declared it to be a political alliance and gave his protection to Venice. Staley describes Carola as strong-willed, energetic and with an ability to create respect and obedience, and says that she was somewhat disliked for the perceived Frankish influence she represented. None of these details are found in previous historical records.

Staley also claims Carola participated in a legendary intrigue constructed by her brother-in-law Beato. According to 'legend', once again a story found in no other sources, Staley relates that Beato married the Byzantine Princess Cassandra in order to replace Doge Obelerio and Dogaressa Carola with himself and Cassandra by support of the Byzantines. Upon the arrival of Cassandra to Venice, Carola destroyed the alliance between Beato and Cassandra by convincing Cassandra to engage in adultery with her youngest brother-in-law, Valentino. In Staley's tale, Carola did succeed, but fell in love with Valentino herself in the process. Staley then claims a Byzantine fleet was sighted in the Adriatic Sea and the Doge felt threatened enough to send for Frankish assistance. His appeal to the Franks supposedly insulted the Byzantines, which lead to the capture of Obelerio and Carola as well as Beato and Cassandra, which were all imprisoned in Constantinople. Other than Obelerio's imprisonment in Constantinople, Staley's account matches very little with the earliest records of this event, suggesting that these details follow the standard archetypes of tragic stories and female temptresses rather than any historical basis.

Preceded by None	Dogaressa of Venice; 804–811	Dogaressa Elena
