= Obelerio degli Antenori =

Doge of Venice from 804 to 811

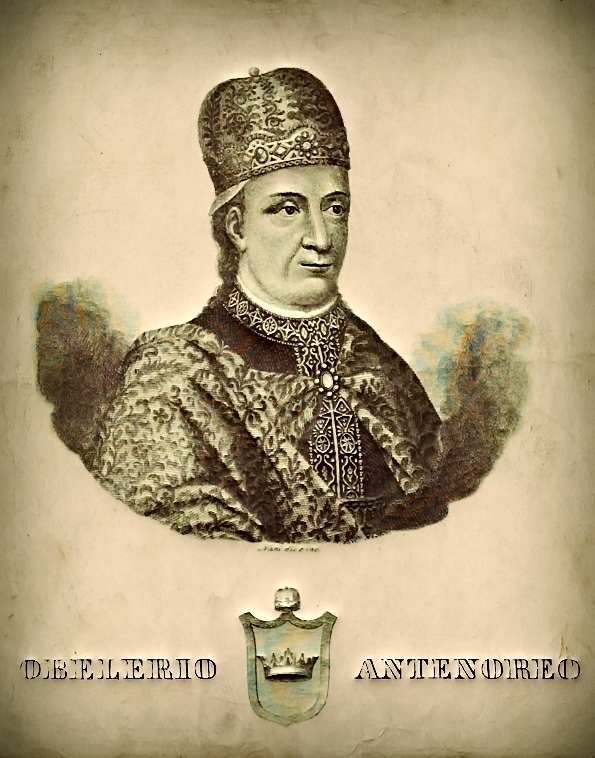

9th Doge of Venice
- In office 804–811
- Preceded by: Giovanni Galbaio
- Succeeded by: Agnello Participazio

Personal details
- Born: Unknown
- Died: 832
- Spouse(s): Carola (m 804–811)

Obelerio degli Antenori (also Antenoreo) was the ninth traditional (seventh historical) Doge of Venice from 804 to 811.

== History ==
He was the son of Encagilio.

Already a tribune during the dogeship of Giovanni Galbaio, he and other Venetian pro-Frankish leaders fled to Treviso. There they elected Obelerio their leader and he led them back to Venice, whence the Galbaii fled, and was elected doge at Malamocco.

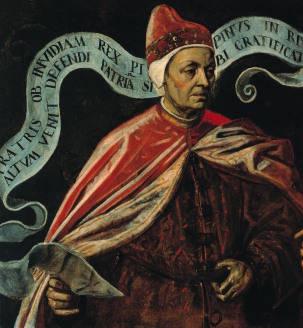
Portrait of Beato in the Doge's Palace. Some sources mistakenly identify the man depicted here as Obelerio.

Obelerio immediately copied his predecessors and appointed as associate doge one of his relatives, his brother Beato. Soon the Antenori were out of favour and the feud between the various factions, the pro-Byzantine at Heraclea and the republican at Malamocco, had fired up. The exiled patriarch of Grado, Fortunatus, returned to Venice from the court of Charlemagne at Aachen and offered to put Venetia under the protection of the Franks if he was reinstated. Obelerio obliged him and happily recognised Frankish sovereignty in return for Frankish protection and legitimation. Obelerio and Beato did homage to Charlemagne in Aachen on Christmas Day 805. Obelerio even chose a Frankish bride: Carola, the first dogaressa.

This act precipitated a war with Byzantium. In 809, a fleet landed in the Venetian lagoon and attacked a Frankish flotilla at Comacchio but was defeated. Obelerio and Beato then raised their other brother Valentino to the dogeship alongside them. This was the last straw and the people rose against them; they called in King Pepin of Italy. He besieged Venice, but only at the last minute did the Antenori try to save face by taking up arms against him. They were booted and Agnello Participazio, who had defended Venice from the beginning, was elected doge.

Obelerio spent the next two decades in exile in Constantinople. He returned on the death of Giustiniano Participazio in 832 with a band of faithful men to reclaim the dogeship. He landed at Vigilia, near Malamocco, but the legitimate doge, Giovanni Participazio, razed the two cities and killed Obelerio, displaying his head in the market.

== Sources ==
- Norwich, John Julius. A History of Venice. Alfred A. Knopf: New York, 1982.

Political offices
Preceded by Giovanni Galbaio	Doge of Venice; 804–811	Succeeded by Agnello Participazio
