= Azerbaijani philosophy =

Philosophy of the Azerbaijani

Azerbaijani philosophy (Azerbaijani: Azərbaycan fəlsəfəsi) is the socio-political thinking of the Azerbaijani people and the collection of the philosophical heritage of Azerbaijani thinkers.

== History ==
An ideology of enlightenment appeared in Azerbaijan in the late 19th - early 20th centuries. It was aimed at westernizing the country. The enlighteners (Mirza Fatali Akhundov, Jalil Mammadguluzade, Shahvalad Jafarov) criticized the country's underdevelopment and religious obscurantism. At this time, the ideas of pan-Turkism (Musavat) also began to spread.

Departments of dialectical and historical materialism were founded in Azerbaijan in 1920. Philosophy was institutionalized under the aegis of Academy of Sciences of the Soviet Union. The philosophical views of Karl Marx, Descartes, Spinoza, Hobbes, John Locke, Hegel and French materialists were studied. A special place in the Azerbaijani philosophy in the 1920s is occupied by Huseyn Javid, Jafar Jabbarli, Nariman Narimanov, Mammad Amin Rasulzadeh, Heydar Huseynov and others.

== Contemporary period ==
The Institute of Philosophy has been operating in the National Academy of Sciences of Azerbaijan since 1945.

Zakir Mammadov (1936-2003) made a huge contribution to the systematization and study of Azerbaijani philosophy. Since 2002, the journal "Philosophy and Socio-Political Sciences" has been published in Azerbaijan. There is the Association of Philosophy and Socio-Political Sciences operating in the country.

Academicians F.Kocharli, F. Kasumzade, A. Aslanov, A. Dashdamirov enriched the Azerbaijani philosophical science of the 20th century with their research on the problems of social philosophy, aesthetics, issues of national relations and the philosophy of history.

== See also ==
List of Azerbaijani scientists and philosophers

Baku Academy of Philosophy

== Bibliography ==
1. Mamedzade I. R. On some issues of the relationship of philosophy and ideology (in the context of Azerbaijan history and culture). Newsletters of the Azerbaijan National Academy of Sciences. 2016;4(3):22–27.
2. Mamedzade I.R. About philosophy. Baku: Teknur; 2011.
3. Mamedzade I.R., Goyushova Z. Modern — Educational ideas of Hasan bey Zardabi and the philosophy of enlightenment. Baku: Teknur; 2015
4. Kocharli F.K., ed. History of the Azerbaijan philosophy. Baku: ELM; 2002.
