= Giovanni I Participazio =

Doge of Venice from 829 to 836

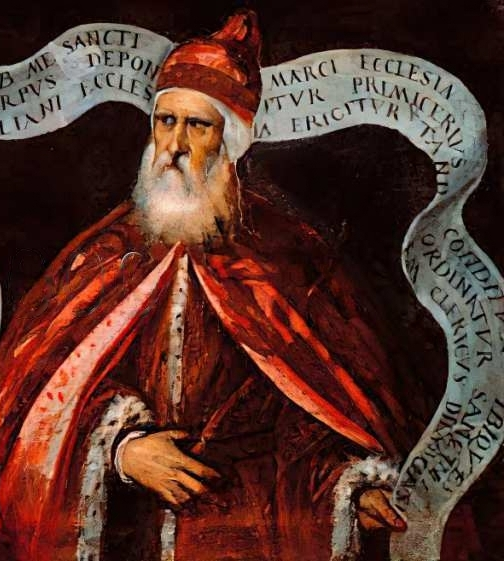
- Portrait in the Doge’s Palace

12th Doge of Venice
- In office 829–836
- Preceded by: Giustiniano Participazio
- Succeeded by: Pietro Tradonico

Personal details
- Born: Unknown
- Died: 837
- Spouse(s): Felicita (m 827–830)

Giovanni I Participazio (or Particiaco) (died 837) was the tenth (historical) or twelfth (traditional) Doge of Venice from the death of his brother in 829 to his arrest and deposition in 836.

== History ==
His father, Agnello, had appointed him co-doge while his brother Giustiniano was away in Constantinople. When Giustiniano returned, Agnello was deposed and Giovanni, who was part of the pro-Frankish faction, was exiled to Zara (in today's Croatia). Giovanni was recalled by his brother from Constantinople in 829 and appointed to succeed him. He was duly elected by the assembly and continued the work of Giustiniano in the construction of a new basilica for the body of Saint Mark. The rest of his reign was occupied by quarrels and problems, internal and external.

The first problem was the return of Obelerio degli Antenori, Doge of Venice from 804 to 811, from Constantinople after twenty years of exile. He disembarked at Vigilia, near Malamocco, with a band of followers and laid claim to the dogeship. Malamocco and Vigilia declared for him and both were burned by Giovanni. Obelerio was killed and his head was displayed to the people.

A revolt in Venice itself placed one of the tribunes, Caroso, on the throne for less than six months, during which Giovanni, surprised by the participation of trusted family members in the rebellion, resided in refuge at the court of Lothair, King of the Lombards. Soon, the Participazio had removed Caroso and blinded him, recalling Giovanni to Venice. His dictatorial rule provoked an aristocratic reaction, led by the Mastalici, and one night in 836, an ambush was laid at the exit of the church of S. Pietro in Olivolo. They arrested him, tonsured him, and put him in the church at Grado.

== Sources ==
- Norwich, John Julius. A History of Venice. Alfred A. Knopf: New York, 1982.

Political offices
Preceded by Giustiniano Participazio	Doge of Venice; 829–836	Succeeded by Pietro Tradonico
