= Agnello Participazio =

Doge of Venice from 811 to 827

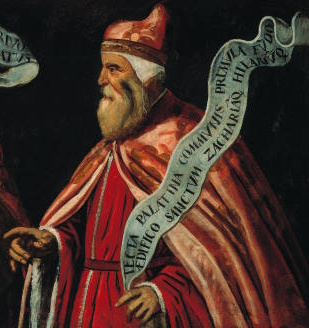
- Portrait in the Doge's Palace

10th Doge of Venice
- In office 811–827
- Preceded by: Obelerio degli Antenori
- Succeeded by: Giustiniano Participazio

Personal details
- Born: Unknown Rivoalto
- Died: 827 Rivoalto
- Spouse(s): Elena (m 811–827)

Agnello Participazio (Latin: Agnellus Particiacus) was the tenth traditional and eighth (historical) doge of the Duchy of Venetia from 811 to 827. He was born to a rich merchant family from Heraclea and was one of the earliest settlers in the Rivoalto group of islands. His family had provided a number of tribuni militum of Rivoalto. He owned property near the Church of Santi Apostoli. A building in the nearby Campiello del Cason was the residence of the tribunes. Agnello was married to the dogaressa Elena.

The name Agnello appeared in the earliest documents (819 and 820) and in John the Deacon's chronicle Historia Veneticorum. It appeared as Angelo in a document datable to 1023. The surname is attested only later, in John the Deacon's chronicle, who attributed it only to Orso II Participazio (911–932). Its attribution to the whole household and to the prior Participazio doges (Agnello Giustiniano (827–829), Giovanni I (829–836), Orso I (864–881) and Giovanni II (881–887) was established by 19th century scholars.

According to some historians Agnello was elected, while others say that he was appointed by Arsaphios, a Byzantine envoy.

== Dogeship ==
With the attempt of Pepin, the king of Italy and son of the emperor Charlemagne, to invade the Lagoon of Venice, the co-doges Obelerio, Beato, and Valentino degli Antenori fled the duchy of Venetia. After Pepin withdrew, Agnello was elected to the dogeship. He moved the ducal seat from Malamocco to Rivoalto. He built the first doge's palace near the old church of San Teodoro. The location was (and still is) where St. Marks Square is now. It was like a castle to defend him more from possible internal enemies than external ones. It burned down when it was set alight during a rebellion against the doge Pietro IV Candiano (959–76).

Pepin's attempt to invade the duchy of Venetia led the Carolingian and the Byzantine empires to agree the Peace of Aachen in 812, which was ratified in 814. In this the duchy of Venetia remained under the Byzantines. Its protection against enemies from the mainland was guaranteed. Its boundaries with the Kingdom of Italy were defined. Its rights to sail freely in the Adriatic Sea were recognised.

Agnello sent his elder son, Giustiniano, on a mission to Constantinople. While Giustiniano was away, he appointed his other son Giovanni as co-doge. Giustiniano was enraged. He refused to go to the palace and went to live at the nearby church of San Severo. He managed to change his father's mind. Giustiniano and his young son Agnello were raised to the co-dogeship. Giovanni was demoted and exiled to Zara (Zadar). He escaped and went to Dalmatia. He then went to Bergamo and put himself under the protection of the emperor Louis II of Italy. Agnello and Giustiniano sent envoys to the emperor to ask for Giovanni to be handed over. The emperor agreed and extradited Giovanni. He was sent to Constantinople with his wife. Later, in 820, the young Agnello was sent to Constantinople for the occasion of the coronation of Michael II, the new Byzantine emperor. He died while he was there.

The dogeships of Giovanni Galbaio (787–804) and Obelerio degli Antenori (804–811) had been marred by a bitter conflict between a pro-Byzantine faction and a pro-Frankish one, which caused great instability and contributed to Pepin's attempted invasion. Fortunato, the patriarch of Grado, was pro-Frankish and a key player in this conflict. Agnello deposed him to avoid further troubles. Fortunato fled to France. Agnello replaced him with Giovanni, the abbot of San Servolo.

One of Agnello's first priorities was to repopulate the places Pepin had ravaged: Chioggia and Albiola. As he was originally from Heraclea, which had been destroyed by his predecessor and by Pepin, he had it rebuilt and renamed Cittanova (New City). He had the church of San Pellegrino, which had been demolished by the inhabitants of Grado during Pepin's attack, rebuilt.

Agnello took measures to coordinate the development of Rivoalto. He put Nicolò Ardisonio in charge of fortifying the lidi (Lido and Pelletrina, the outlying islands of the lagoon) against the sea, also placing Lorenzo Alimpato in charge of land reclamation and Pietro Tradonico of the construction of new buildings. This was the beginning of the Rivolato group of islands developing into the city of Venice.

Agnello founded monasteries on the islands of Barnaba and San Giuliano and provided priests with good supplies for the maintenance and decoration of churches wherever this was needed. He and his son Giovanni donated land on their properties in San Ilario to the monks on the island of San Servolo.

The Byzantine emperor Leo V the Armenian sent the relics of St. Zachary, paid for the construction of a monastery and church of San Zaccaria dedicated to this saint and sent architects to build it. He needed the friendship of Venice to obtain its support against the Saracens who were invading Sicily.

== Sources ==
- Norwich, John Julius, A History of Venice, Penguin, 2012; ISBN 0241953049
- Pozza, Marco, Patriciaco Agnello, Dizionario Biografico degli Italiani, Vol. 81, 2014
- Romanin Samuele, Storia Documentata Di Venezia, Volume 3. Ulan Press, 2012. ASIN B009MHJXEG

Political offices
Preceded by Obelerio degli Antenori	Doge of Venice; 811–827	Succeeded by Giustiniano Participazio
