= Philosophy in 90 Minutes series =

- Author: Paul Strathern
- Series: Philosophy in 90 Minutes; or Philosophers in 90 Minutes
- Subject: Philosophy and related history
- Publisher: Ivan R. Dee, Rowman & Littlefield
- Publication place: USA
- Media type: Book, Audio-book

The Philosophy in 90 Minutes series, written by Paul Strathern, is a series of short introductory biographical overviews on well-known philosophers, set in brief historical context, along with brief impressions of their philosophies. The books are also produced in audio format; read by narrator Robert Whitfield. The series’ intent is to "write about the philosophers' lives, [while] adding in a few of their ideas"

== Contents ==
The books and audio presentations are considered to be outlines of the given philosopher. Interesting anecdotes about the subject are pervasive, and lines are quoted from published works in "an epigraphic style". Each volume contains relevant chronologies, including a chronology of philosophy that is repeated in at least some books. Finally several suggested further reading titles are also included.

== Titles in the series ==
Volume title	Philosopher	Publication date
Aristotle in 90 Minutes	Aristotle	September 1, 1996
Berkeley in 90 Minutes	George Berkeley	April 10, 2000
Bertrand Russell in 90 Minutes	Bertrand Russell	April 17, 2001
Confucius in 90 Minutes	Confucius	May 4, 1999
Derrida in 90 Minutes	Jacques Derrida	November 10, 2000
Descartes in 90 Minutes	René Descartes	September 1, 1996
Dewey in 90 Minutes	John Dewey	September 24, 2002
Foucault in 90 Minutes	Michel Foucault	April 10, 2000
Hegel in 90 Minutes	Georg Wilhelm Friedrich Hegel	April 1, 1997
Heidegger in 90 Minutes	Martin Heidegger	April 9, 2002
Hume in 90 Minutes	David Hume	May 4, 1999
J. S. Mill in 90 Minutes	John Stuart Mill	September 24, 2002
Kant in 90 Minutes	Immanuel Kant	September 1, 1996
Kierkegaard in 90 Minutes	Søren Kierkegaard	April 1, 1997
Leinbiz in 90 Minutes	Gottfried Wilhelm Leibniz	November 10, 2000
Locke in 90 Minutes	John Locke	November 16, 1999
Machiavelli in 90 Minutes	Niccolò Machiavelli	November 1, 1998
Marx in 90 Minutes	Karl Marx	April 17, 2001
Nietzsche in 90 Minutes	Friedrich Nietzsche	September 1, 1996
Plato in 90 Minutes	Plato	September 1, 1996
Rousseau in 90 Minutes	Jean-Jacques Rousseau	April 9, 2002
Sartre in 90 Minutes	Jean-Paul Sartre	June 1, 1998
Schopenhauer in 90 Minutes	Arthur Schopenhauer	November 8, 1999
Socrates in 90 Minutes	Socrates	April 1, 1997
Spinoza in 90 Minutes	Baruch Spinoza	November 1, 1998
St. Augustine in 90 Minutes	Augustine of Hippo	April 1, 1997
Thomas Aquinas in 90 Minutes	Thomas Aquinas	June 1, 1998
Wittgenstein in 90 Minutes	Ludwig Wittgenstein	January 1, 1996
