= Paul Strathern =

Scottish writer and academic

Paul Strathern (born 1940) is a Scots-Irish writer and academic.

== Early life and education ==
Strathern was born in London, and studied philosophy at Trinity College, Dublin, after which he served in the Merchant Navy over a period of two years. He then lived on a Greek island. In 1966, he travelled overland to India and the Himalayas. His novel A Season in Abyssinia won a Somerset Maugham Award in 1972.

== Career ==
Besides five novels, he has also written books on science, philosophy, history, literature, medicine and economics. He is the author of two series of short introductory books: Philosophers in 90 Minutes and The Big Idea: Scientists Who Changed the World.

His book on the history of chemistry entitled Mendeleyev's Dream (2000) was short-listed for the Aventis Prize, and his works have been translated into over two dozen languages.

His work on economic history Dr Strangelove's Game (2001) was chosen as a Google business book of the year. His book Ten Cities that Changed The World (2022) was chosen as a Waterstones History Book of the Year.

Strathern was a lecturer at Kingston University, where he taught philosophy and mathematics.

== Personal life ==
Strathern has one daughter.

== List of books ==
=== Novels ===
- Pass by the Sea: A Novel (London: Weidenfeld and Nicolson, 1968)
- A Season in Abyssinia: An Impersonation of Arthur Rimbaud (London: Macmillan, 1972; reissued London: Faber and Faber, 2014)
- One Man's War (London: Quartet Books, 1973; reprinted 1974)
- Vaslav: An Impersonation of Nijinsky (London: Quartet Books, 1975)
- The Adventures of Spiro (Brighton: Harvester Press, 1979)

=== Popular history ===
- Exploration by Land (Silk and Spices Routes Series; London: Belitha Press for UNESCO, 1993); published in Irish as Bóthar an tSíoda: taiscéalaíocht thar tír (Baile Átha Cliath [i.e. Dublin]: An Gúm, 2000)
- Mendeleyev's Dream: The Quest for the Elements (London: Hamish Hamilton, 2000; US edn. New York: St. Martin's Press, 2001; reissued London: Penguin, 2001). Selected as one of Bill Gates' '5 of my all-time favorite books'.
- Dr Strangelove's Game: A Brief History of Economic Genius (London: Hamish Hamilton, 2001; reissued London: Penguin, 2002); also published as A Brief History of Economic Genius (New York; London: Texere, 2002)
- The Medici: Godfathers of the Renaissance (London: Jonathan Cape, 2003; reissued London: Vintage Books, 2007); also published as The Medici: Power, Money, and Ambition in the Italian Renaissance (New York: Pegasus Books, 2016); published in Italian as I Medici: potere, denaro e ambizione (I volti della storia, no. 427; Pisa: Newton Compton, 2017) and Russian
- A Brief History of Medicine from Hippocrates to Gene Therapy (London: Robinson, 2005)
- Napoleon in Egypt: The Greatest Glory (London: Jonathan Cape, 2007; reissued London: Vintage, 2008)
- The Artist, the Philosopher and the Warrior: Leonardo, Machiavelli and Borgia. A Fateful Collusion (London: Jonathan Cape, 2009; reissued London: Vintage, 2010)
- Death in Florence: the Medici, Savonarola and the Battle for the Soul of the Renaissance City (London: Jonathan Cape, 2011; reissued London: Vintage, 2012)
- The Spirit of Venice: from Marco Polo to Casanova (London: Jonathan Cape, 2012; reissued London: Pimlico, 2013; digital edn. London: Vintage Digital, 2012)
- The Periodic Table (The Knowledge Series, no. 3; London: Quadrille, 2015)
- Quacks, Rogues and Charlatans of the R[oyal] C[ollege of] P[hysicians]: 50 Books from the College Collection (500 Reflections on the R[oyal] C[ollege of] P[hysicians], 1518–2018; London: Little, Brown, 2016)
- The Borgias: Power and Fortune (Atlantic 2019)
- Rise and Fall: A History of the World in Ten Empires (Hodder 2019)
- The Florentines: from Dante to Galileo (Atlantic 2021)
- Ten Cities That Changed The World (Hodder 2022)
- The Other Renaissance: From Copernicus to Shakespeare (Atlantic 2022)
- Dark Brilliance: The Age of Reason from Descartes to Peter the Great (Atlantic 2024). A Waterstones History Book of the Year 2024.

Philosophers in 90 Minutes/Virgin Philosophers

- Wittgenstein (1889–1951) in 90 Minutes (Philosophers in 90 Minutes Series; London: Constable, 1996); reissued as The Essential Wittgenstein (Virgin Philosophers Series; London: Virgin, 2002)
- Hume (1711–76) in 90 Minutes (Philosophers in 90 Minutes Series; London: Constable, 1996); reissued as The Essential Hume (Virgin Philosophers Series; London: Virgin, 2002); published in French as Hume, je connais! (Air de savoir. Série Les philosophes, je connais; Paris: Mallard Editions, 1998)
- Kant (1724–1804) in 90 Minutes (Philosophers in 90 Minutes Series; London: Constable, 1996); reissued as The Essential Kant (Virgin Philosophers Series; London: Virgin, 2002)
- Locke (1632–1704) in 90 Minutes (Philosophers in 90 Minutes Series; London: Constable, 1996)
- Descartes in 90 Minutes (Philosophers in 90 Minutes Series; Chicago: I.R. Dee, 1996); reissued as The Essential Descartes (Virgin Philosophers Series; London: Virgin, 2002)
- Plato (428–348 BC) in 90 Minutes (Philosophers in 90 Minutes Series; London: Constable, 1996); reissued as The Essential Plato (Virgin Philosophers Series; London: Virgin, 2002)
- Aristotle (384–322 BC) in 90 Minutes (Philosophers in 90 Minutes Series; London: Constable, 1996); reissued as The Essential Aristotle (Virgin Philosophers Series; London: Virgin, 2002)
- Nietzsche (1844–1900) in 90 Minutes (Philosophers in 90 Minutes Series; London: Constable, 1996); reissued as The Essential Nietzsche (Virgin Philosophers Series; London: Virgin, 2002)
- St. Augustine in 90 Minutes (Philosophers in 90 Minutes Series; London: Constable, 1997)
- Sartre in 90 Minutes (Philosophers in 90 Minutes Series; Chicago: Ivan R. Dee, 1998); reissued as The Essential Sartre (Virgin Philosophers Series; London: Virgin, 2002)
- Machiavelli in 90 Minutes (Philosophers in 90 Minutes Series; Chicago: Ivan R. Dee, 1998); reissued as The Essential Machiavelli (Virgin Philosophers Series; London: Virgin, 2002)
- Confucius in 90 Minutes (Philosophers in 90 Minutes Series; Chicago: Ivan R. Dee, 1999); reissued as The Essential Confucius (Virgin Philosophers Series; London: Virgin, 2002)
- Foucault in 90 Minutes (Philosophers in 90 Minutes Series; Chicago: Ivan R. Dee, 2000); reissued as The Essential Foucault (Virgin Philosophers Series; London: Virgin, 2002)
- Marx in 90 Minutes Philosophers in 90 Minutes Series; Chicago: Ivan R. Dee, 2001); reissued as The Essential Marx (Virgin Philosophers Series; London: Virgin, 2002)
- The Essential Derrida (Virgin Philosophers Series; London: Virgin, 2003)
- The Essential Hegel (Virgin Philosophers Series; London: Virgin, 2003)
- The Essential Rousseau (Virgin Philosophers Series; London: Virgin, 2002)
- The Essential Socrates (Virgin Philosophers Series; London: Virgin, 2003)
- The Essential Spinoza (Virgin Philosophers Series; London: Virgin, 2003)

Great Writers in 90 Minutes

- Beckett in 90 minutes (London:Ivan R.Dee, 2004)
- Dostoievsky in 90 minutes (London: Ivan R.Dee, 2004)
- Garcia Marquez in 90 minutes (London: Ivan R.Dee, 2004)
- Kafka in 90 minutes (London: Ivan R.Dee, 2004)
- Nabokov in 90 minutes (London: Ivan R.Dee, 2004)
- James Joyce in 90 minutes (London: Ivan R.Dee, 2005)
- D. H. Lawrence in 90 minutes (London: Ivan R.Dee, 2005)
- Hemingway in 90 minutes (London:Ivan R.Dee, 2005)
- Virginia Woolf in 90 minutes (London: Ivan R.Dee, 2005)
- Borges in 90 minutes (London: Ivan R.Dee, 2006)
- Tolstoy in 90 minutes (London: Ivan R.Dee, 2006)

The Big Idea: Scientists Who Changed the World

- Pythagoras & His Theorem (Big Idea Series; London: Arrow, 1997)
- Turing & the Computer (Big Idea Series; London: Arrow, 1997)
- Hawking & Black Holes (Big Idea Series; London: Arrow, 1997)
- Newton & Gravity (Big Idea Series; London: Arrow, 1997)
- Crick, Watson & DNA (Big Idea Series; London: Arrow, 1997)
- Einstein & Relativity (Big Idea Series; London: Arrow, 1997)
- Galileo & the Solar System (Big Idea Series; London: Arrow, 1998)
- Bohr & Quantum Theory (Big Idea Series; London: Arrow, 1998)
- Oppenheimer & the Bomb (Big Idea Series; London: Arrow, 1998)
- Curie & Radioactivity (Big Idea Series; London: Arrow, 1998)
- Archimedes & the Fulcrum (Big Idea Series; London: Arrow, 1998)
- Darwin & Evolution (Big Idea Series; London: Arrow, 1998)

=== Travel ===
- Greece and the Greek Islands: The Versatile Guide (London: Duncan Petersen, 1994; 2nd edn. 1996)
- Florida: Travel Planner & Guide (London: Duncan Petersen, 1996)
- Australia: Travel Planner & Guide (London: Duncan Peterson, 1997)
