= Giovanni Galbaio =

Doge of Venice from 787 to 804

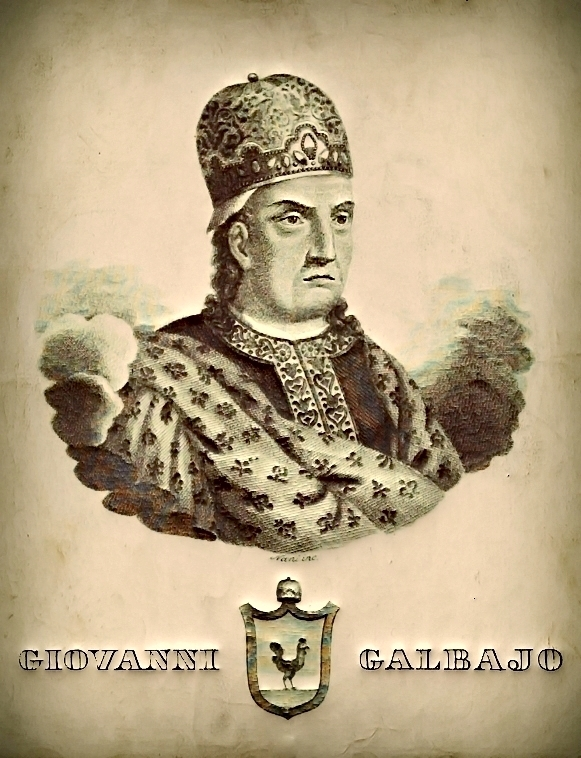

8th Doge of Venice
- In office 787–804
- Preceded by: Maurizio Galbaio
- Succeeded by: Obelerio degli Antenori

Personal details
- Born: Unknown
- Died: 804

Giovanni Galbaio was the eighth Doge of Venice (787–804) according to tradition, but only the sixth historically verifiable one.

== Life ==
He succeeded his father Maurizio Galbaio, who had associated him as doge in 778. The Byzantine emperor Leo IV the Khazar recognised his title in that year, though the attempt to set up a hereditary monarchy endangered Maurizio's own dogeship.

Giovanni had been briefly held captive by the Lombard king Desiderius after a campaign in Istria, but his father, through the pope, sent ambassadors to Charlemagne, the king of the Franks, to petition for Giovanni's release.

== Career ==
Upon his inheriting, without election, the full office of his father, he immediately began a vendetta against the patriarch of Grado, who represented the church and its opposition to the slave trade. Charlemagne, a dutiful son of the church and now king of Lombardy, supported the abolition of slavery in his domains and thus came to resent the Venetian commerce in the Adriatic. The patriarch, in the reign of Maurizio, had even instigated the expulsion and confiscation of goods of the Venetian merchants in the Pentapolis. Giovanni had the Empress Irene name his son Maurizio co-doge.

Trying to counter influence the patriarch, Giovanni appointed his sixteen-year-old nephew Christopher bishop of Olivolo. The patriarch refused to consecrate him, officially due to his age, but actually because of his anti-Frankish stances. Maurizio II was sent to attack Grado with a flotilla of ships. There the elderly patriarch was thrown to his death from the tower. The opposition to the Galbaii family fled to Treviso while the nephew of the patriarch, Fortunatus, was elected in his stead and immediately fled to the Frankish court. The opposition crystallised under the leadership of one Obelerio degli Antenori and returned to Venice. Giovanni, with Maurizio and Christopher, fled to Mantua in 803, where they all probably died. Obelerio succeeded them.

The Galbaio family later returned to Venice and assumed the name of Querini.

== Sources ==
- Norwich, John Julius. A History of Venice. Alfred A. Knopf: New York, 1982.

Political offices
Preceded by Maurizio Galbaio	Doge of Venice; 787–804	Succeeded by Obelerio degli Antenori
