= Giustiniano Participazio =

Doge of Venice from 827 to 829

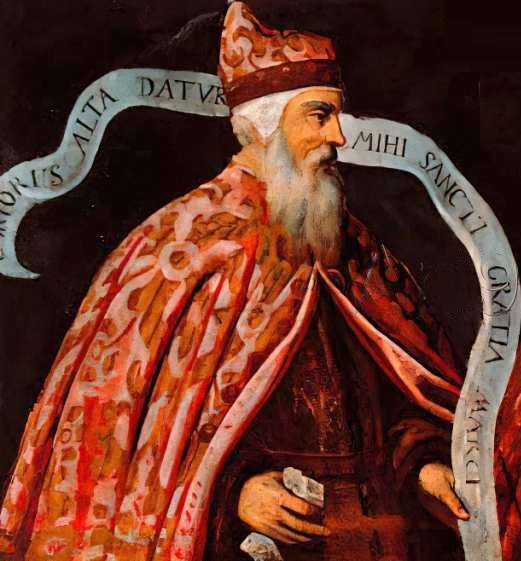
- Portrait in the Doge’s Palace

11th Doge of Venice
- In office 827–829
- Preceded by: Agnello Participazio
- Succeeded by: Giovanni I Participazio

Personal details
- Born: Unknown
- Died: 829

Giustiniano Participazio (Latin: Agnellus Iustinianus Particiacus; died 829) was the eleventh (traditional) or ninth (historical) Doge of Venice from 825 to his death. His four years on the ducal throne were very eventful. He was made hypatus by the Byzantine emperor Leo V the Armenian.

== History ==
Giustiniano was away in Constantinople when his father, the then-reigning Doge Agnello, appointed his younger brother Giovanni co-doge. When Giustiniano returned, he flew into a fury. Agnello appointed his third son, also Agnello, co-doge and began to oppose Giustiniano, even besieging him in the church of San Severo. Giustiniano gained the upper hand, however, and exiled his younger brother and succeeded his father as doge in 827. He was married to a woman named Felicita.

The Byzantine Emperor, Michael II, offered military support to Venice in return for a contingent of Venetians in his expedition against the Aghlabid expeditionary force at Sicily. The success of the expedition increased the prestige of the city.

While the contest (fomented by Charlemagne and by Lothair I) between the patriarchs of Grado and Aquileia over the Istrian bishoprics continued, Giustiniano worked to increase the prestige of the Venetian church itself. Traditionally, Venice was first evangelised by Saint Mark himself and many Venetians made the pilgrimage to Mark's grave in Alexandria, Egypt. According to tradition, Giustiniano ordered merchants, Buono di Malamocco and Rustico di Torcello, to corrupt the Alexandrine monks which guarded the body of the evangelist and steal it away secretly to Venice. Hiding the body amongst some pork, the Venetian ship slipped through customs and sailed into Venice on 31 January 828 with the body of Saint Mark. Giustiniano decided to build a ducal chapel dedicated to Saint Mark to house his remains: the first Basilica di San Marco in Venice.

Giustiniano recalled his brother Giovanni from Constantinople, because he had no sons by his wife, and appointed him to continue the construction of the new church for Venice's new patron saint. Giovanni succeeded the aged Giustiniano on the latter's death the next year.

== Sources ==
- Norwich, John Julius. A History of Venice. Alfred A. Knopf: New York, 1982.
- Şerban Marin. Giustiniano Partecipazio and the Representation of the First Venetian Embassy to Constantinople in the Chronicles of the Serenissima, "Historical Yearbook", 2 (2005), p. 75-92.

Political offices
| Preceded by Agnello Participazio | Doge of Venice; 827–829 | Succeeded by Giovanni I Participazio |
