= Timeline of the Republic of Venice =

This article presents a detailed timeline of the history of the Republic of Venice from its legendary foundation to its collapse under the efforts of Napoleon.

== 4th century ==
- 395 - The Roman Empire is divided. The Western Roman Empire is encompassing the Praetorian prefecture of Italy, that includes the province of Venetia et Histria, centered in Aquileia.

== 5th century ==
- 421 - According to much later traditions, the city of Venice is founded on Friday, 25 March, by three consuls from Padua, with the establishment of a trading-post on the islands of the Rialto and the church of San Giacomo di Rialto. The account is found in some medieval chronicles, but not accepted by scholars, since settlements on Rialto were fully urbanized much later and transformed into Venice proper only since the first half of the 9th century.
- 452 – Attila the Hun, from central Asia, invades Italy and sacks Aquileia
- 466 – Representatives of the island communities meet in Grado to work out a rudimentary system of self-government through 12 tribunes elected annually.
- 476 – Fall of the Western Roman Empire, after the deposition of Romulus Augustulus by Odoacer, a military leader in Italy of east German descent.
- 493 – Odoacer is overthrown by Theodoric the Great, an Arian Christian who had received his education in Constantinople.

== 6th century ==
- 535 – Byzantine Emperor Justinian I launches the campaign which will become the Gothic War for the re-conquest of Italy
- 554 – The Gothic War ends with Byzantine victory: entire Italy is again under imperial rule, and governed as the Praetorian prefecture of Italy, that includes the province of Venetia et Histria, centered in Aquileia.
- 568 – Lombards, a Germanic tribe, invades Italy under King Alboin, and conquered Aquileia. Byzantine province of Venetia is reduced to coastal regions, and its administrative center is moved to Oderzo, while ecclesiastical center is moved from Aquileia to Grado.
  - Bishop Paul of Altino hears “a voice from heaven” commanding him to climb to the top of a nearby tower and look to the stars for the path to where he must take his flock. They lead him to an island in the centre of the lagoon, later named Torcello “little tower” in memory of the one the bishop had climbed.
  - The people of Concordia Sagittaria flee to Caorle
  - The people of Padua choose Malamocco
- 584 – The remaining Byzantine territories of the Praetorian prefecture of Italy are reorganized into the Exarchate of Ravenna, that also includes the remanents of Byzantine Venetia.

== 7th century ==
- 639 – Byzantine Venetia is governed by magister militum Mauricius. Lombards capture Oderzo whose inhabitants flee to Cittanova which is renamed Heraclea in honor of the Byzantine Emperor.
- 697
  - According to later chronicles, a general assembly of all the peoples of the lagoons is called to Heraclea by the Patriarch of Grado and elects a single ruler in place of the twelve tribunes – Paolo Lucio Anafesto, but those accounts are not accepted by modern scholars.
  - The newly erected Basilica of Santa Maria Assunta on the island of Torcello is consecrated.

== 8th century ==
- 712 – Lombard king Liutprand (712-744) ascends the throne. During his reign, Ravenna is briefly occupied by the Lombards for the first time, but soon recaptured to the Byzantines. The Terminatio Liutprandina regulates borders between Lombard and Byzantine possessions at Cittanova. Byzantine Venetia is governed by magister militum Marcellus.
- 726 – Byzantine emperor Leo III orders the destruction of icons. The lagoon communities rise up in rebellion.
- 726 or 727 – Paul, imperial Exarch of Ravenna, is assassinated; according to later chronicles, so is the second traditional doge Marcello Tegalliano. Orso from Eraclea is elected chief of the 12 tribunes. He is given the title of “dux” (which becomes "doge" in the local dialect). Orso is the first historically attested Doge of Venice (the third according to the legendary list which began in 697), having received the title “Ipato” or Consul by the Byzantine Emperor
- 737 – Assassination of Doge Orso Ipato and beginning of the five year “Interregnum”
- 742 – Teodato Ipato, Doge Orso Ipato’s son, is elected to be the next Doge. He transfers his seat of government from Heraclea to Malamocco on the Lido which is thought to be more easily defended. He rules as a sovereign.
- 751
  - Fall of Ravenna by the Lombards under King Aistulf ends the Exarchate of Ravenna The Exarch himself is killed.
  - The last Frankish Merovingian monarch, Childeric III, is deposed and the Carolingian Pepin the Short is elected King
- 753 – Pepin the Short, son of Charles Martel (and the father of Charlemagne) invades Italy at the invitation of Pope Stephen II
- 755 – Doge Teodato Ipato is deposed and blinded by his successor, Doge Galla Gaulo
- 756
  - Doge Galla Gaulo is deposed and blinded by Doge Domenico Monegario
  - The Francs, having driven out the Lombards, donate the territory of Ravenna to the Pope who claims the Exarch for himself.
- 764
  - In order to maintain necessary good relations with both the Byzantine Empire and the Franks, two tribunes are elected annually to limit ducal power. Doge Domenico Monegario, who becomes resentful of the two tribunes, is deposed, blinded, and exiled
  - Doge Maurizio Galbaio, a well-born Heraclean who claims to descend from the Emperor Galba, is elected Doge
- 778 – Doge Maurizio Galbaio associates his son Giovanni with him in the Dogeship, thus allowing him to succeed his father without popular sanction or approval of his subjects
- c.780 – The Rialto Islands gradually become permanently settled, and on the island of Olivolo (modern-day Isola di San Pietro di Castello) the chapel of Saints Bacchus and Sergius is rebuilt and reconsecrated as the cathedral of St. Peter. It remained the cathedral of Venice for a thousand years, until the City was occupied by Napoleon at the end of the eighteenth century.
- c.788-790 – Byzantine Istria is annexed by the Franks
  - Doge Maurizio Galbaio appoints his sixteen-year-old nephew Christopher bishop of Olivolo, but when the Patriarch of Grado refuses to consecrate him a flotilla of ships is sent to attack Grado, and there the elderly Patriarch of Grado is thrown to his death from a tower. The new Patriarch of Grado, Fortunatus, flees in exile to the court of Charlemagne at Aachen

== 9th century ==
- 803 – Opposition to the Galbaii family forces Doge Giovanni Galbaio, with his son Christopher to flee to Mantua
- 804
  - Obelerio degli Antenori is elected Doge and immediately associates his brother Beato to the Dogeship
  - The exiled Patriarch of Grado, Fortunatus, returns to Venice from the court of Charlemagne at Aachen and proposes that, in return for his being re-instated at Grado, and the Doge's acceptance of the authority of Charlemagne (who was crowned Emperor of the West by the Pope on Christmas Day AD 800) the Venetians could count on the protection of the Franks when needed. Doge Obelerio degli Antenori accepts.
- 805
  - 25 December (Christmas Day) – Doge Obelerio degli Antenori and his brother Beato do homage to Charlemagne in Aachen
  - Doge Obelerio degli Antenori chooses a Frankish bride; Carola, the first Dogaressa
- 809
  - Venetian recognition of Charlemagne as Emperor of the West is seen as treachery by the Eastern Emperor in Constantinople and a Byzantine fleet sails up the Adriatic and attacks a Frankish flotilla at the port of Comacchio situated to the south of the Venetian Lagoon. It is defeated.
  - Doge Obelerio and his brother Beato raise yet another brother, Valentino, to the Dogeship alongside them. It is one step too much for the Venetian people who rise up in opposition against them. Obelerio calls upon Charlemagne's son King Pepin of Italy installed at Ravenna to intervene on their behalf, as had been promised by the agreement of 804.
- 810
  - King Pepin of Italy with his army and cavalry sets out from his capital Ravenna to invade the Venetian capital Malamocco, situated on the Lido. But the inhabitants of the lagoon put up fierce resistance under the leadership of Agnello Participazio from Rialto. The siege lasts six months and Pepin's army is ravaged by the diseases of the local swamps and forced to withdraw. A few months later Pepin dies
  - Doge Obelerio is deposed, and Agnello Participazio, who has defended Venice from the beginning, is chosen to replace him.
  - Former Doge Obelerio degli Antenori spends the next two decades in exile in Constantinople
- 811 – Agnello Participazio is the eighth Venetian to hold the title of Doge. His Rialtine house on the present Campiello del Cason becomes the first Doge's Palace within the Venice we know today, soon to be rebuilt in stone next to the chapel of Saint Theodore which stood on the site now occupied by the Basilica of Saint Mark.
- 827 – Giustiniano Participazio is elected Doge
- 828 – Relics of Saint Mark the Evangelist arrive in Venice having been stolen from Alexandria in Egypt by the merchants Bono da Malamocco and Rustico da Torcello
- 829 – Giovanni I Participazio arrested, and tonsured (head shaved like monk)
- 832 – Former Doge Obelerio degli Antenori returns from two decades of exile in Constantinople with a band of faithful men to reclaim the Dogeship. He lands at Vigilia, near Malamocco, but the legitimate Doge, Giovanni Participazio, razes the two cities and kills Obelerio degli Antenori displaying his head in the market
- 837 – Pietro Gradonico assassinated, although in this case his successor arrests and executes the assassins
- 839 – The Venetian Navy conducts military operations against Croats, led by Mislav of Croatia, who sign a peace treaty with doge Pietro Tradonico
- 840 –
  - Pietro's military assault on the Narentines fails
  - Pactum Lotharii demonstrates Venice's independence from the Byzantine Empire by signing its own treaties
  - Title of the Doge drops mention as province of the Byzantine Empire (Dux Venetiarum Provinciae becomes Dux Veneticorum
- 841 – The Republic of Venice sends a fleet of 60 galleys (each carrying 200 men) to assist the Byzantines in driving the Arabs from Crotone, but fail
- 846 – The Narentines breach Venice itself, and raid the neighbouring lagoon city of Caorle
- 864 – Orso I Participazio is elected Doge
- 881 – Giovanni II Participazio resigns due to poor health
- 887 – Narentines defeated Venetians near the town of Makarska, killing the Venetian doge Pietro I Candiano in open battle. Venetians start paying Croatian prince Branimir (879–892), an annual tribute for the right to travel and trade in the Adriatic Sea
- 888 – Pietro Tribuno is elected Doge

== 10th century ==
- 912 – Orso II Participazio is elected Doge
- 932 – Pietro II Candiano is elected Doge
- 939 – Pietro Participazio is elected Doge
- 942 – Pietro III Candiano is elected Doge
- 948 – With the weakening of Byzantium, Venice began to see Ragusa as a rival who needed to be brought under her control, but the attempt to conquer the city failed
- 959 – Pietro IV Candiano is locked in his palace with his son while it burned.
- 976 – Pietro I Orseolo resigned to become a Camaldolese hermit in Abbey of Sant Miguel de Cuxa in the Pyrenees
- 978 – Vitale Candiano is elected Doge
- 979 – Tribuno Memmo is elected Doge
- 991 – Pietro II Orseolo gave the majority of his wealth to the poor and the Church, and retired to a monastery
- 996 – Venetian Doge Pietro II Orseolo stop to pay tribute to the Narentine Pirates, after several incursion in the Venetian cities.

== 11th century ==
- 1000 – A powerful fleet move to Istria and Dalmatia commanded by Doge Pietro II Orseolo to secure the Venetian fight Narentine pirates, who were suppressed permanently. The bloodiest armed conflict during the expedition was the battle of Lastovo
- 1009 – Otto Orseolo arrested, beard shaved, and banished to Constantinople for nepotism. He was the father of King Peter Urseolo of Hungary.
- 1026 – Pietro Barbolano abdicated under heavy pressure to reinstate Otto Orseolo
- 1032 – Domenico Flabanico is elected Doge
- 1043 – Domenico Contarini is elected Doge
- 1071 – Domenico Selvo is elected Doge
- 1082 – Needing Venetian naval assistance, the Byzantine emperor Alexios I Komnenos grants them major trading concessions within his Empire in a chrysobull
- 1084
  - Domenico Selvo personally leads a fleet against the Normans, but is defeated and loses 9 great galleys, the largest and most heavily armed ships in the Venetian war fleet. He is deposed the same year by popular revolt to a monastery where he dies three years later
  - Vitale Faliero is elected Doge
- 1099 – St Mark's Basilica is consecrated in the presence of the Holy Roman Emperor Henry IV
- 1096
  - First Crusade begins
  - Vitale I Michiel is elected Doge

== 12th century ==
- 1102 – Ordelafo Faliero is elected Doge
- 1104 – Traditional date for commencement of construction of the permanent Arsenale
- 1105 – Great fire of Venice
- 1110 – Ordelafo Faliero personally commands a Venetian fleet of 100 ships to assist Baldwin I of Jerusalem in capturing the city of Sidon
- 1116: July 15 – Doge Ordelafo Faliero conquers the troops of Stephen II of Hungary who have arrived to relieve Zara and the remaining towns of Dalmatia surrender to Venice
- 1117 – Stephen II of Hungary regains Dalmatia while the Venetians are on a naval expedition, Doge Ordelafo Faliero dying in battle near Zara; Domenico Michele is elected Doge to succeed him, reconquers the territory and agrees a 5-year truce
- 1122 – Byzantine emperor John II Komnenos refuses to renew the trading rights granted by Alexios I in 1082. The Venetian fleet raids the Greek coasts in retaliation, until the rights are re-confirmed in 1125
- 1130 – Pietro Polani is elected Doge
- 1143 – The Commune Veneciarum is founded
- 1148 – Domenico Morosini is elected Doge
- 1156 – Vital II Michele is elected Doge
- 1171 – The Byzantine emperor Manuel I Komnenos expels all Venetians from Constantinople. Outbreak of a war that continues inconclusively until relations normalize ca. 1180
- 1172
  - The Maggior Consiglio – the Great Council of Venice – is founded
  - Sebastiano Ziani is elected Doge
- 1177 – Pope Alexander III is reconciled with Emperor Frederick Barbarossa in the Basilica of St. Mark thanks to the intercession of Doge Sebastiano Ziani
- 1178 – Orio Mastropiero is elected Doge
- 1182 – Massacre of the Latins in Constantinople
- 1183 – The Dalmatian city of Zara (Zadar) rebels against Venetian rule
- 1192 – Enrico Dandolo is elected Doge and is the first Doge to make the promissione ducale

== 13th century ==
- 1202: 23 November – During the Fourth Crusade, crusader and Venetians reconquered Zara. Unable to raise enough funds to pay to their Venetian contractors, the crusaders agree to reconquer the city
- 1203 – The Fourth Crusade is diverted towards the Byzantine capital, Constantinople, under the request of the Byzantine Emperor
- 1204: April – Sack of Constantinople by the crusaders and Venetians conquered Constantinople, the Byzantine Empire is succeeded by the Latin Empire (Partitio terrarum imperii Romaniae), Venice emerges has great benefits. Doge Enrico Dandolo obtains the title of Lord of a Quarter and Half a Quarter of the Roman Empire. Venice seizes the Horses of Saint Mark
- 1205
  - Pietro Ziani is elected Doge
- 1211 – The island of Candia (Crete) is annexed to Venice
- 1229
  - Jacopo Tiepolo is elected Doge
  - The founding of the Consiglio dei Pregadi (Senate)
- 1249 – Marino Morosini is elected Doge
- 1252 – Reniero Zeno is elected Doge
- 1256 – Outbreak of the first war against Genoa, the "War of Saint Sabas", which lasts until 1270
- 1261 – Reconquest of Constantinople by the Byzantine Greek Empire of Nicaea and re-establishment of the Byzantine Empire
- 1263 – Venetian victory against the Genoese and Byzantines at the Battle of Settepozzi
- 1264 – The Genoese capture a Venetian trade convoy at the Battle of Saseno.
- 1266 – Venetian victory against the Genoese at the Battle of Trapani
- 1268
  - Lorenzo Tiepolo is elected Doge
  - A ten-year peace treaty with Byzantium grants Venice trading privileges.
- 1271 – Marco Polo leaves for Cathay
- 1275 – Jacopo Contarini is elected Doge
- 1277 – A two-year peace treaty with Byzantium grants Venice trading quarters in Constantinople and Thessalonica.
- 1280 – Giovanni Dandolo is elected Doge
- 1284 – First gold ducat is minted, which is to be known as the zecchino beginning in 1554
- 1289 – Pietro Gradenigo is elected Doge
- 1294 – Renewal of hostilities with Genoa, which last until 1299
- 1295
  - Return of Marco Polo from Cathay
  - Pietro Gradenigo sent a fleet of 68 ships to attack a Genoese fleet at Alexandretta
- 1297 – Admission to the Maggior Consiglio – the Great Council of Venice – is restricted for the first time on 28 February
- 1298 – Marco Polo is taken prisoner during the Battle of Curzola by Genoa
- 1299 – Pietro Gradenigo sends a fleet of 100 ships to attack the Genoese

== 14th century ==
- 1304 – Salt War with Padua
- 1310 – 15 June – Plot by Baiamonte Tiepolo and Marco Querini is quelled. The Consiglio dei Dieci – the Council of Ten – is set up to try the culprits
- 1311 – Marino Zorzi is elected Doge
- 1312 – Giovanni Soranzo is elected Doge
- 1328 – Francesco Dandolo is elected Doge
- 1337 – Serrvalle is acquired
- 1339
  - Bartolomeo Gradenigo is elected Doge
  - Scaliger War: Treviso is taken from the Scaligeri
  - Bassano del Grappa is acquired
- 1342 – Andrea Dandolo is elected Doge
- 1345 – Siege of Zadar begins and lasts until 1346. It was successful.
- 1348 – The Black Plague begins to spread in Venice killing half of the population
- 1350 – Third war with Genoa breaks out and lasts until 1355. Venice allies with the Byzantines and the Pisans
- 1354 – Marino Faliero is elected Doge and convicted of treason after a failed attempt to overthrow Republican Rule on 17 April. He is executed and condemned to damnatio memoriae
- 1355 – Giovanni Gradenigo is elected Doge
- 1356 – Giovanni Dolfin is elected Doge
- 1361 – Lorenzo Celsi is elected Doge
- 1363 – The Revolt of Saint Titus breaks out in Crete that needed considerable military force and five years to suppress
- 1365 – Marco Cornaro is elected Doge
- 1367 – Andrea Contarini is elected Doge
- 1368 – The War of Trieste begins in order to secure Adriatic trade routes. The war ends in 1370
- 1378 – Outbreak of the fourth and final Venetian–Genoese War, the "War of Chioggia", which lasts until 1381
- 1380
  - The Venetians destroy the Genoese fleet at the Battle of Chioggia
  - Oderzo is acquired
- 1381 – End of the War of Chioggia with the Peace of Turin on 8 August
- 1382 – Michele Morosini is elected Doge
- 1382 – Antonio Venier is elected Doge
- 1388 – Treviso passes into permanent Venetian control
- 1389 – December 19 – Episcopal County of Ceneda which includes Conegliano peacefully submits to Venetian overlordship

== 15th century ==
- 1400 – Michele Steno is elected Doge
- 1404 – Venice extends its rule over Vicenza, Belluno, and Feltre
- 1405 – Venice acquires Vicenza, Verona, Padua, and Este
- 1409 – Ladislaus of Naples sells his "rights" on Dalmatia to the Republic of Venice for 100,000 ducats. Dalmatia will with some interruptions remain under Venetian rule for nearly four centuries, until 1797.
- 1410 – Venice has a navy of 3,300 ships (manned by 36,000 men) and has taken over most of Venetia, including such important cities as Verona and Padua
- 1413 – Tommaso Mocenigo is elected Doge
- 1420
  - Venice conquers the Patriarchate of Aquileia
  - Traù, Spalato, Durazzo and other Dalmatian cities are acquired
- 1423
  - Francesco Foscari is elected Doge
  - August – The Treaty of Sveti Srdj ends the Second Scutari War with the Serbian Despotate
- 1425 – War breaks out against Filippo Maria Visconti of Milan
- 1426
  - Treaty of Vučitrn confirms arrangements ending the Second Scutari War
  - Brescia becomes a Venetian possession
- 1428 – Bergamo becomes a Venetian possession
- 1446 – The Republic fights another league, formed by Milan, Florence, Bologna and Cremona
- 1453: May 29 – Constantinople falls to the Ottoman Turks, but Venice manages to maintain a colony in the city and some of the former trade privileges it had under the Byzantines
- 1454
  - The Ottoman Turks grant the Venetians access to their ports and trading rights
  - The Peace of Lodi confirms Venetian rule as far as the Adda (river)
- 1457 – Pasquale Malipiero is elected Doge after Doge Francesco Foscari is forced to abdicate by the Council of Ten
- 1462 – Cristoforo Moro is elected Doge
- 1463 – Outbreak of the First Ottoman–Venetian War (1463–79)
- 1471 – Nicolo Tron is elected Doge
- 1473 – Nicolo Marcello is elected Doge
- 1474 – Pietro Mocenigo is elected Doge
- 1476 – Andrea Vendramin is elected Doge
- 1478 – Giovanni Mocenigo is elected Doge
- 1479 – January 24: Treaty of Constantinople is signed, finally making peace with the Ottoman Turks. Venice has to cede Argos, Negroponte, Lemnos and Scutari, and pay an annual tribute of 10,000 gold ducats. In September, painter Gentile Bellini is sent by the Senate to the new Ottoman capital, Constantinople, as a cultural ambassador
- 1481 Venice retakes Rovigo which it had held previously from 1395 to 1438
- 1482 – Venice allied with Pope Sixtus IV in his attempt to conquer Ferrara, opposed to Florence, Naples, Milan and Ercole d'Este
- 1484 – The treaty of peace between Venice and the Ottoman Turks is confirmed by Mehmed II's successor, Bayezid II, with the pacific exchange of the islands of Zakynthos and Kefalonia between the two states
- 1485 – Marco Barbarigo is elected Doge
- 1486 – Agostino Barbarigo is elected Doge
- 1488 – Portuguese explorer Bartolomeu Dias rounds the Cape of Good Hope, providing Europeans with a direct all-sea route to the Indian Ocean
- 1489 – February -Catherine Cornaro, widow of the last king, James II, willingly cedes Cyprus to Venice
- 1492 – Christopher Columbus discovers the Americas; the major European trade centers begin to shift away from the Mediterranean
- 1495 – In exchange of the financial support provided by the Republic to the Kingdom of Naples against France, Venice receives from Ferdinand II of Naples some ports on the coast of Apulia: Trani, Mola di Bari (where the castle remains unconquered), Monopoli, Brindisi, Otranto, Gallipoli.
- 1498 – arrival of Vasco da Gama of Portugal in India, destroying Venice's land route monopoly over the Eastern trade
- 1499 – Venice allies itself with Louis XII of France against Milan, gaining Cremona. **Outbreak of the Second Ottoman–Venetian War, when the Ottoman sultan moves to attack Lepanto. The Venetian fleet under Antonio Grimani, more a businessman and diplomat than a sailor, is defeated by the Ottoman navy in the Battle of Zonchio

== 16th century ==
- 1501 – Leonardo Loredan is elected Doge
- 1508 – Eager to take some of Venice's lands, all neighbouring powers join in the League of Cambrai under the leadership of Pope Julius II
- 1509 – Venice is engaged in various military endeavors
  - 14 May: Venice is crushingly defeated at the Battle of Agnadello, in the Ghiara d'Adda, marking one of the most delicate points of Venetian history. French and imperial troops were occupying the Veneto, but Venice manages to extricate herself through diplomatic efforts
  - July: Andrea Gritti recaptures Padua, successfully defending it against the besieging imperial troops. Spain and the Pope break off their alliance with France, and Venice regains Brescia and Verona from France
- 1515 – Venice forms an alliance with France and defeats the imperial and Swiss soldiers in the battle of Marignano
- 1514: 10 January – Great fire in the Rialto
- 1516 – Venetian Ghetto instituted
- 1521 – Antonio Grimani is elected Doge
- 1523 – Andrea Gritti is elected Doge
- 1530 – End of the Venetian domination in Apulian ports in Mola di Bari, Monopoli, Trani, Brindisi, Otranto e Gallipoli, Apulia.
- 1537 – Outbreak of the Third Ottoman–Venetian War, which lasts until 1540. The Ottomans unsuccessfully besiege Corfu
- 1538 – Pietro Lando is elected Doge
- 1545 – Francesco Donato is elected Doge
- 1553 – Marcantonio Trivisan is elected Doge
- 1554 – Francesco Venier is elected Doge
- 1556 – Lorenzo Priuli is elected Doge
- 1559 – Girolamo Priuli is elected Doge
- 1563 – The population of Venice has dropped to about 168,000 people
- 1567 – Pietro Loredan is elected Doge
- 1569
  - Five banks fail
  - 13/14 September – Arsenale fire
- 1570 – Alvise I Mocenigo is elected Doge. Outbreak of the Fourth Ottoman–Venetian War (1570–73), when the Ottomans attack Cyprus. Formation of the Holy League including Venice, Spain and the Papacy
- 1571
  - 1 August – Famagusta is surrendered to the Ottomans. The Venetian defender Marco Antonio Bragadin is subsequently flayed alive
  - 7 October – The Christian fleet defeats the Turks at the Battle of Lepanto but the allies fail to take advantage of their victory
- 1573 – The loss of Cyprus is ratified in the peace of 1573
- 1575 – The population of Venice is about 175,000 people
- 1575–1577 – Bubonic plague strikes Venice, killing around 25% of the population
- 1577 – Sebastiano Venier is elected Doge
- 1578 – Nicolò da Ponte is elected Doge
- 1581 – The population of Venice is down to about 124,000 people
- 1585 – Pasqual Cicogna is elected Doge
- 1588: 9 June – The first stone of the Rialto Bridge is laid
- 1591 – The Rialto Bridge is completed
- 1595 – Marino Grimani is elected Doge

== 17th century ==
- 1605 – Conflict between Venice and the Holy See begins with the arrest of two members of the clergy guilty of petty crimes, and with a law restricting the Church's right to enjoy and acquire landed property
- 1606
  - Anti-clericalist Leonardo Donato is elected Doge
  - Venetian Interdict imposed
- 1607 – Venetian Interdict lifted due to intercession with the Pope by France
- 1609 – Galileo Galilei presents a telescope to Venice
- 1612 – Marcantonio Memmo is elected Doge
- 1615
  - Giovanni Bembo is elected Doge
  - War of Gradisca against Uskok pirates begins, continuing until 1617
- 1617 – The Spanish viceroy of Naples attempts to break Venetian dominance by sending a naval squadron to the Adriatic and fails
- 1618
  - Nicolò Donato is elected Doge
  - Antonio Priuli is elected Doge
- 1623 – Francesco Contarini is elected Doge
- 1624 – Giovanni I Cornaro is elected Doge
- 1630
  - Nicolò Contarini is elected Doge
  - Plague breaks out in Venice
- 1631
  - Francesco Erizzo is elected Doge
  - The plague ends in Venice with 50,000 dead – nearly a third of the population. As a votive offering for the city's deliverance from the pestilence, Venice builds a church to Our Lady of Health (Santa Maria della Salute)
- 1638 – While the Venetian fleet is cruising off Crete, a corsair fleet from Barbary consisting of 16 galleys from Algiers and Tunis enters the Adriatic
- 1645 – Beginning of the Cretan War (1645–69) (Candian War) between Venice and the Ottoman Turks. Although Venice is generally superior at sea, its forces are unable to prevent the Turks from landing in and conquering much of Crete, nor of dislodging them after
- 1646 – Francesco Molin is elected Doge
- 1647: August–September – The Ottomans lay siege to Sebenico (now Šibenik, Croatia), but fail to take it
- 1648 – During the Cretan War, Venetian commander Leonardo Foscolo seizes several forts in Dalmatia, retakes Novigrad, temporarily captures the Knin Fortress, and manages to compel the garrison of Klis Fortress to surrender.
- 1655 – Carlo Contarini is elected Doge
- 1656
  - Francesco Cornaro is elected Doge
  - Bertuccio Valiero is elected Doge
- 1658 – Giovanni Pesaro is elected Doge
- 1659 – Domenico II Contarini is elected Doge
- 1666 – An expedition to retake Chania fails
- 1669 – An attempt to lift the siege of Candia with joint action on land with the French contingent and by sea under Mocenigo fails. End of the Cretan War (1645–69) with Venice losing Crete
- 1674 – Nicolò Sagredo is elected Doge
- 1676 – Alvise Contarini is elected Doge
- 1683 – Marcantonio Giustinian is elected Doge
- 1684 – Venice, taking advance of the recent Turkish defeat in the siege of Vienna, forms an alliance with Austria against the Ottoman Turks. Beginning of the Morean War, a part of the Great Turkish War, which lasts until 1699
- 1688
  - Francesco Morosini is elected Doge
  - Morosini fails to capture Negroponte
- 1694 – Silvestro Valiero is elected Doge
- 1699 – The Great Turkish War ends with the Treaty of Karlowitz. Venice makes extensive territorial gains in southern Greece

== 18th century ==
- 1700 – Alvise II Mocenigo is elected Doge
- 1709 – Giovanni II Cornaro is elected Doge
- 1714 – December: the Ottoman Turks declared war on Venice, the seventh and last conflict between the two powers.
- 1715 – A huge Ottoman army under Grand Vizier Silahdar Damat Ali Pasha overruns the Morea
- 1716 – Successful defense against Ottoman siege of Corfu. Austrian intervention takes off pressure from the Venetians, but they are unable to retake their lost possessions
- 1717 – Performance of Juditha Triumphans an oratorio of Antonio Vivaldi commissioned by the Republic to celebrate allegorically the defense of Corfu
- 1718: 21 July – The Treaty of Passarowitz – Austria makes large territorial gains, but Venice loses the Morea, for which her small gains in Albania and Dalmatia, where the Venetians are able to advance up to the modern-day Bosnian/Croatian border, taking in the whole Sinjsko Polje and Imotski, are little compensation
- 1722 – Sebastiano Mocenigo is elected Doge
- 1732 – Carlo Ruzzini is elected Doge
- 1735 – Alvise Pisani is elected Doge
- 1741 – Pietro Grimani is elected Doge
- 1744 – Work begins at the Lido on construction of the murazzi breakwater to protect the lagoon from sea storms
- 1752 – Francesco Loredan is elected Doge
- 1762 – Marco Foscarini is elected Doge
- 1763 – Alvise Giovanni Mocenigo is elected Doge
- 1779 – Paolo Renier is elected Doge
- 1782 – Pope Pius VI visits Venice along with several princes of Russia
- 1785 – Angelo Emo begins an expedition to northern Africa against the Barbary pirates. His expedition will end in 1786
- 1789 – Ludovico Manin is elected Doge. He will ultimately be the last Doge of the Republic of Venice
- 1796 – Prelude to the Fall of the Republic
  - The Republic of Venice can no longer defend itself since its war fleet numbers only 4 galleys and 7 galliots
  - French troops occupy the Venetian state up to the Adige. Vicenza, Cadore and Friuli are held by the Austrians
- 1797 – The Fall of the Republic
  - April 9 – Napoleon threatens Venice with war
  - May 1 – Domenico Pizzamano fires on a French ship trying to force an entry from the Lido forts. Napoleon declares war
  - May 12 – The Maggior Consiglio – the Great Council of Venice – sits for the last time and approves a motion to hand over power "to the system of the proposed provisional representative government", although there is not a quorum of votes: 512 vote for, ten against, and five abstain
  - May 16 – The provisional municipal government meets in the Hall of the Maggior Consiglio. The preliminaries of the Peace of Leoben are made even harsher in the Treaty of Campoformio, and Venice and all her possessions become Austrian
  - October 18 – The accord is signed at Passariano, forcing Ludovico Manin to abdicate and thus ending the Republic of Venice after more than a thousand years

== See also ==
- History of the Republic of Venice
- Doge of Venice
- Timeline of the city of Venice
- Historical states of Italy
- Wars in Lombardy
- History of Byzantine Empire
- Patriarchate of Aquileia
- Ottoman wars in Europe
- Italian Wars
- Marco Polo
- Napoleonic Wars
- Timeline of Brescia 1426–1797
- Timeline of Padua, 1405–1797
- Timeline of Verona, 1405–1796
- Treaty of Campoformio
- History of Friuli
- Venetian Slovenia
- Venetian Albania

== Sources ==
- Gasparri, Stefano (2015). "The formation of an early medieval community: Venice between provincial and urban identity". Three empires, three cities: Identity, material culture and legitimacy in Venice, Ravenna and Rome, 750-1000. Brepols: Turnhout. pp. 35–50. ISBN 978-2-503-56562-0.
- Gasparri, Stefano (2018). "The First Dukes and the Origins of Venice". Venice and Its Neighbors from the 8th to 11th Century: Through Renovation and Continuity. Leiden-Boston: Brill. pp. 5–26. ISBN 978-90-04-35361-9.
- Gasparri, Stefano (2021). "The Origins of Venice: Between Italy, Byzantium and the Adriatic". Byzantium, Venice and the Medieval Adriatic: Spheres of Maritime Power and Influence, c. 700-1453. Cambridge: Cambridge University Press. pp. 98–110. ISBN 978-1-108-84070-5.
- Gelichi, Sauro (2021a). "The Northern Adriatic Area between the Eighth and the Ninth Century: New Landscapes, New Cities". Byzantium, Venice and the Medieval Adriatic: Spheres of Maritime Power and Influence, c. 700-1453. Cambridge: Cambridge University Press. pp. 111–132. ISBN 978-1-108-84070-5.
- Gelichi, Sauro (2021b). "The Venetiae, the Exarchate and the Pentapolis". A Companion to Byzantine Italy. Boston-Leiden: Brill. pp. 360–386. ISBN 978-90-04-30770-4.
- Nicol, Donald M. (1992) [1988]. Byzantium and Venice: A Study in Diplomatic and Cultural Relations (2. ed.). Cambridge: Cambridge University Press. ISBN 978-0-521-42894-1.
- Norwich, John J. (1982). A History of Venice. New York: Knopf. ISBN 978-0-394-52410-8.
- Pazienza, Annamaria (2018). "Archival Documents as Narrative: The Sources of the Istoria Veneticorum and the Plea of Rižana". Venice and Its Neighbors from the 8th to 11th Century: Through Renovation and Continuity. Leiden-Boston: Brill. pp. 27–50. ISBN 978-90-04-35361-9.
- Peters, Edward; Foulke, William D., eds. (2003) [1907]. Paul the Deacon: History of the Lombards. Philadelphia: University of Pennsylvania Press. ISBN 0-8122-1079-4.
- Wickham, Chris (1981). Early Medieval Italy: Central Power and Local Society, 400-1000. Totowa, NJ: Barnes & Noble. ISBN 978-0-389-20217-2.
- Wozniak, Frank E. (1981). "East Rome, Ravenna and Western Illyricum: 454-536 A.D." Historia: Zeitschrift für Alte Geschichte. 30 (3): 351–382.
