= List of doges of Venice =

Doge of Venice
- Coat of Arms

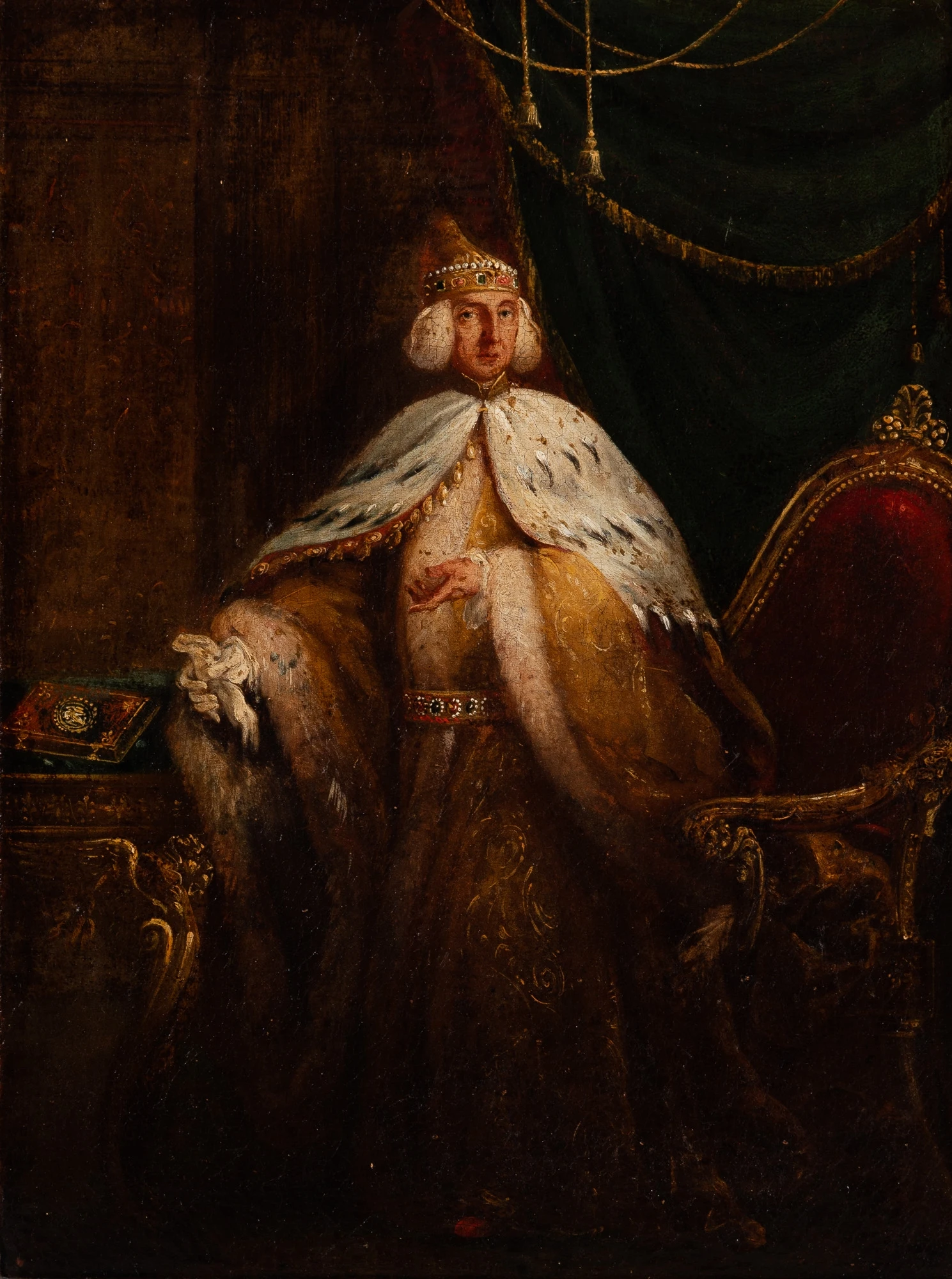
- Last Ruler; Ludovico Manin
- Style: His Serenity
- Residence: Palazzo Ducale
- Appointer: Serenissima Signoria
- Formation: 8th century
- First holder: Orso Ipato
- Final holder: Ludovico Manin
- Abolished: 12 May 1797

The following is a list of doges of Venice, ordered by the dates of their reigns.

For more than 1,000 years, the chief magistrate and leader of the city of Venice and later of the Most Serene Republic of Venice was styled as the doge, a rare but not unique Italian title derived from the Latin dux. The doges of Venice were elected for life by the city-state's aristocracy. The Venetian combination of elaborate monarchic pomp and a republican (though "aristocratic") constitution with intricate checks and balances makes "La serenissima" (Venice) a textbook example of a classical republic.

Despite the great power given to them, the Venetian doges were restricted by law (unlike the doges of the Republic of Genoa) to spend the rest of their lives inside the Doge's Palace complex and St Mark's Basilica, occasionally leaving for diplomatic reasons.

== Magistri militum of Byzantine Venetia ==
| # | Name | Reigned | Note | Sources |
|---|---|---|---|---|
| 1 | Mauricius | 639 | Regional governor (magister militum) of Byzantine Venetia. | |
| 2 | Marcellus | First half of the 8th century | Regional governor (magister militum) of Byzantine Venetia. | |

== Legendary doges ==
| # | Portrait | Name | Reigned | Coat of Arms | Note |
|---|---|---|---|---|---|
| 1 | | Paolo Lucio Anafesto | 697–717 | Coat of Arms | Designated as the first doge by some later medieval chronicles, but not accepted as such by modern scholars. |
| 2 | | Marcello Tegalliano | 717–726 | Coat of Arms | Designated as the second doge by some later medieval chronicles, but not accepted as such by modern scholars. |

== First historical doge ==
| # | Portrait | Name (Birth–Death) | Reigned | Coat of Arms | Note |
|---|---|---|---|---|---|
| 3 | | Orso Ipato (died 737) | 726–737 | Coat of Arms | Ipato is described as the first historical Doge of Venice. Nominated by the popular assembly opposed to the iconoclast policies of the Byzantine Emperor; murdered by rebels during a civil conflict |

== Annual magistri militum ==
| # | Portrait | Name (Birth–Death) | Reigned | Coat of Arms | Note |
|---|---|---|---|---|---|
| 1 | | Domenico Leoni | 738 | | Leoni was the first Byzantine magister militum per Venetiae. |
| 2 | | Felice Cornicola | 739 | | |
| 3 | | Teodato Ipato | 739 | | |
| 4 | | Jovian Ceparius | 741 | | Sometimes called Jovian Ceparius Hypatus (Gioviano Ceparico Ipato). |
| 5 | | John Fabriacus | 742 | | |

== Ducal period ==
| # | Portrait | Name (Birth–Death) | Reigned | Coat of Arms | Note |
|---|---|---|---|---|---|
| 4 | | Teodato Ipato | 742–755 | | The first doge since its restoration. Deposed, blinded, and exiled. |
| 5 | | Galla Gaulo | 755–756 | | Deposed, blinded, and exiled. |
| 6 | | Domenico Monegario (died 764) | 756–764 | | Deposed, blinded, and exiled. |
| 7 | | Maurizio Galbaio (died 787) | 764–787 | | The first historical doge not to be forcefully removed from power. |
| 8 | | Giovanni Galbaio (Unknown) | 787–804 | | Fled to Mantua in 803 with family, where they all probably died. |
| 9 | | Obelerio degli Antenori (Unknown) | 804–811 | | Exiled, attempted to return to power, killed and head displayed in the market. |
| 10 | | Agnello Participazio (died 827) | 811–827 | | |
| 11 | | Giustiniano Participazio (died 829) | 827–829 | | |
| 12 | | Giovanni I Participazio (died 837) | 829–836 | | Arrested and tonsured (head shaved like a monk). |
| 13 | | Pietro Tradonico (c. 800 – 13 September 864) | 836–864 | | Assassinated, although in this case his successor arrested and executed the assassins. |
| 14 | | Orso I Participazio (died 881) | 864–881 | | |
| 15 | | Giovanni II Participazio (died 887/888) | 881–887 | | Resigned due to poor health. |
| 16 | | Pietro I Candiano (died 18 September 887) | 887–887 | | Killed in open battle while invading the Narentines. |
| — | | Giovanni II Participazio (died 887/888) | 887–887 | | Briefly reassumed office before resigning again after a few months. |
| 17 | | Pietro Tribuno (died 912) | 887–912 | | |
| 18 | | Orso II Participazio (died 932) | 912–932 | | |
| 19 | | Pietro II Candiano (c. 872–939) | 932–939 | | |
| 20 | | Pietro Participazio (died 942) | 939–942 | | |
| 21 | | Pietro III Candiano (died 959) | 942–959 | | |
| 22 | | Pietro IV Candiano (928–976) | 959–976 | | Assassinated, along with his son Pietro, while fleeing an arson attack on the Doge's Palace by rebelling citizens. |
| 23 | | Pietro I Orseolo (928–987) | 976–978 | | Resigned to become a Benedictine hermit in the Abbey of Saint-Michel-de-Cuxa in the Pyrenees. |
| 24 | | Vitale Candiano (died 979) | 978–979 | | Abdicated, for health reasons. |
| 25 | | Tribuno Memmo (died 991) | 979–991 | | Deposed peacefully to a monastery. Died shortly afterwards. |
| 26 | | Pietro II Orseolo (961−1009) | 991–1009 | | |
| 27 | | Otto Orseolo (993−1032) | 1009–1026 | | Arrested, beard shaved, and banished to Constantinople for nepotism. |
| 28 | | Pietro Barbolano (died 1032) | 1026–1030 | | Forced to abdicate by the Orseolo. Banished to Constantinople and forced to became a monk. |
| — | | Orso Orseolo (988−1049) | 1030–1032 (As regent for Otto Orseolo) | | Patriarch of Grado and regent on behalf of his brother, Otto Orseolo. Otto never assumed de facto power, having died on his journey back from Constantinople. |
| — | | Domenico Orseolo (died after 1036) | 1032–1032 | | Appointed Doge by his brother Orso Orseolo, but rejected by the popular assembly. He was subsequently exiled to Ravenna, where he died. |
| 29 | | Domenico Flabanico (died 1041) | 1032–1041 | | |
| 30 | | Domenico I Contarini (died 1071) | 1041–1071 | | |
| 31 | | Domenico Selvo (died 1087) | 1071–1084 | | Deposed peacefully to a monastery because of naval defeat, died three years later. |
| 32 | | Vitale Faliero (died 1095) | 1084–1095 | | |
| 33 | | Vitale I Michiel (died 1102) | 1095–1102 | | |
| 34 | | Ordelafo Faliero (died 1117) | 1102–1117 | | |
| 35 | | Domenico Michiel (died 1130) | 1117–1130 | | |
| 36 | | Pietro Polani (died 1148) | 1130–1148 | | |

== Republican period ==
| # | Portrait | Name (Birth–Death) | Reigned | Coat of Arms | Note |
|---|---|---|---|---|---|
| 37 | | Domenico Morosini (died February 1156) | 1148–1156 | | |
| 38 | | Vitale II Michiel (died 1172) | 1156–1172 | | Murdered |
| 39 | | Sebastiano Ziani (1178) | 1172–1178 | | Resigned to a monastery, died three days later |
| 40 | | Orio Mastropiero (died 13 June 1192) | 1178–1192 | | |
| 41 | | Enrico Dandolo (1107 – May/June 1205) | 21 June 1192 – June 1205 | | |
| 42 | | Pietro Ziani (died 13 March 1230) | 1205–1229 | | Resigned in February 1229 |
| 43 | | Jacopo Tiepolo (died 19 July 1249) | 1229–1249 | | |
| 44 | | Marino Morosini (1181– January 1, 1253) | 1249–1253 | | |
| 45 | | Reniero Zeno (died 7 July 1268) | 1 January 1253 – 7 July 1268 | | |
| 46 | | Lorenzo Tiepolo (died 15 August 1275) | 1268–1275 | | |
| 47 | | Jacopo Contarini (1194–1280) | 1275–1280 | | |
| 48 | | Giovanni Dandolo (died 2 November 1289) | 31 March 1280 – 2 November 1289 | | |
| 49 | | Pietro Gradenigo (c. 1251 – 14 August 1311) | 1289–1311 | | |
| 50 | | Marino Zorzi (c. 1231 – 3 July 1312) | 1311–1312 | | |
| 51 | | Giovanni Soranzo (1240 – 31 December 1328) | 1312–1328 | | |
| 52 | | Francesco Dandolo (died 1339) | 1329–1339 | | |
| 53 | | Bartolomeo Gradenigo (1263 – 28 December 1342) | 7 November 1339 – 28 December 1342 | | |
| 54 | | Andrea Dandolo (1306 – 7 September 1354) | 1343 – 7 September 1354 | | |
| 55 | | Marino Faliero (1274 – 17 April 1355) | 11 September 1354 – 15 April 1355 | | Convicted of treason, executed and condemned to damnatio memoriae. Age c.80/81 |
| 56 | | Giovanni Gradenigo (c. 1280 – 8 August 1356) | 21 April 1355 – 8 August 1356 | | Age c.75/76 |
| 57 | | Giovanni Dolfin (c. 1303 – 12 July 1361) | August 13, 1356 – 12 July 1361 | | Age c. 53/58 |
| 58 | | Lorenzo Celsi (c. 1310 – 18 July 1365) | 16 July 1361 – 18 July 1365 | | Age c. 51/55 |
| 59 | | Marco Cornaro (c. 1286 – 13 January 1368) | 21 July 1365 – 13 January 1368 | | Age c. 79/82 |
| 60 | | Andrea Contarini (c. 1300/1302 – 5 June 1382) | 1367 – 5 June 1382 | | Age c. 67/82 |
| 61 | | Michele Morosini (1308 – 16 October 1382) | 10 June 1382 – 16 October 1382 | | Age c. 74/74 |
| 62 | | Antonio Venier (c. 1330 – 23 November 1400) | Late October 1382 – 23 November 1400 | | Age c. 52/70 |
| 63 | | Michele Steno (1331 – 26 December 1413) | 1 December 1400 – 26 December 1413 | | Age c. 69/82 |
| 64 | | Tommaso Mocenigo (1343– 4 April 1423) | Early January 1414 – 4 April 1423 | | Age c. 71/80 |
| 65 | | Francesco Foscari (19 June 1373 – 1 November 1457) | 15 April 1423 – 22 October 1457 | | His reign was the longest of all Doges in Venetian history. Was forced to abdicate by the Council of Ten. Age 49/84 |
| 66 | | Pasquale Malipiero (1392 – 5 May 1462) | 30 October 1457 – 5 May 1462 | | Age c. 65/70 |
| 67 | | Cristoforo Moro (1390 – 10 November 1471) | Mid to Late May 1462 – 10 November 1471 | | Age c. 72/81 |
| 68 | | Nicolò Tron (c. 1399 – 28 July 1473) | Late November 1471 – 28 July 1473 | | Age c. 72/74 |
| 69 | | Nicolò Marcello (c. 1399 – 1 December 1474) | 13 August 1473 – 1 December 1474 | | Age c. 74/75 |
| 70 | | Pietro Mocenigo (3 January 1406– 23 February 1476) | 14 December 1474 – 23 February 1476 | | Age 68/70 |
| 71 | | Andrea Vendramin (1393 – 5 May 1478) | Early to Mid March 1476 – 5 May 1478 | | Age c. 83/85 |
| 72 | | Giovanni Mocenigo (1409 – 4 November 1485) | Mid to Late May 1478 – 4 November 1485 | | Age c. 69/76 |
| 73 | | Marco Barbarigo (c. 1413 – 14 August 1486) | Mid to Late November 1485 – 14 August 1486 | | Age c. 72/73 |
| 74 | | Agostino Barbarigo (3 June 1419 – 20 September 1501) | Late August/Early September 1486 – 20 September 1501 | | Age 67/82 |
| 75 | | Leonardo Loredan (16 November 1436 – 22 June 1521) | 13 October 1501 – 22 June 1521 | | Age 64/84 |
| 76 | | Antonio Grimani (28 December 1434 – 7 May 1523) | Early July 1521 – 7 May 1523 | | Age 86/88 |
| 77 | | Andrea Gritti (17 April 1455 – 28 December 1538) | 20 May 1523 – 28 December 1538 | | Age 68/83 |
| 78 | | Pietro Lando (1462 - 9 November 1545) | Late December 1538/Early January 1539 – 9 November 1545 | | Age c. 76/83 |
| 79 | | Francesco Donato (c. 1468–1553) | Late November 1545 – 23 May 1553 | | Age c. 77/85 |
| 80 | | Marcantonio Trivisan (c. 1475 – 31 May 1554) | Early June 1553 – 31 May 1554 | | Age c. 78/79 |
| 81 | | Francesco Venier (29 May 1489 - 2 June 1556) | 11 June 1554 – 2 June 1556 | | Age 65/67 |
| 82 | | Lorenzo Priuli (1489 – 17 August 1559) | Mid to Late June 1556 – 17 August 1559 | | Age c. 67/70 |
| 83 | | Girolamo Priuli (1486 – 4 November 1567) | 1 September 1559 – 4 November 1567 | | Age c. 73/81 |
| 84 | | Pietro Loredan (1481 – 3 May 1570) | 29 November 1567 – 3 May 1570 | | Age c. 86/89 |
| 85 | | Alvise I Mocenigo (26 October 1507 – 4 June 1577) | Mid to Late May 1570 – 4 June 1577 | | Age 62/69 |
| 86 | | Sebastiano Venier (c. 1496 – 3 March 1578) | 11 June 1577 - 3 March 1578 | | Age c. 81/82 |
| 87 | | Nicolò da Ponte (15 January 1491 – 30 July 1585) | 3 March 1578 – 30 July 1585 | | * There are references to a long, drawn out election process requiring 44 votes, but the appointment date matches the date of death of the previous Doge who held a Life term and served until death. This is unusual as most election appointments are between 1 and 3 weeks following the passing of the previous Doge (averaging around 2 weeks). Age 87/94 |
| 88 | | Pasquale Cicogna (27 May 1509 - 2 April 1595) | Early to Mid August 1585 – 2 April 1595 | | Age 76/85 |
| 89 | | Marino Grimani (1 July 1532 – 25 December 1605) | 26 April 1595 – 25 December 1605 | | Age 62/73 |
| 90 | | Leonardo Donato (12 February 1536 – 16 July 1612) | 10 January 1606 – 16 July 1612 | | Age 69/76 |
| 91 | | Marcantonio Memmo (11 November 1536 – 31 October 1615) | 24 July 1612 – 31 October 1615 | | Age 75/78 |
| 92 | | Giovanni Bembo (21 August 1543 – 16 March 1618) | 2 December 1615 – 16 March 1618 | | Age 72/74 |
| 93 | | Nicolò Donato (28 January 1539 – 8 May 1618) | 5 April 1618 – 8 May 1618 | | Age 79/79 |
| 94 | | Antonio Priuli (10 May 1548 – 12 August 1623) | 17 May 1618 – 12 August 1623 | | Age 70/75 |
| 95 | | Francesco Contarini (28 November 1556 – 6 December 1624) | 8 September 1623 – 6 December 1624 | | Age 66/68 |
| 96 | | Giovanni I Cornaro (11 November 1551 – 23 December 1629) | 24 January 1625 – 23 December 1629 | | Age 73/78 |
| 97 | | Nicolò Contarini (26 September 1553 – 2 April 1631) | 18 January 1630 – 2 April 1631 | | Age 76/77 |
| 98 | | Francesco Erizzo (18 February 1566 – Venice, 3 January 1646) | 10 April 1631 – 3 January 1646 | | Age 65/79 |
| 99 | | Francesco Molin (21 April 1575 – 27 February 1655) | 20 January 1646 – 27 February 1655 | | Age 70/79 |
| 100 | | Carlo Contarini (5 July 1580 – 1 May 1656) | 27 March 1655 – 1 May 1656 | | Age 74/75 |
| 101 | | Francesco Cornaro (6 March 1585 – 5 June 1656) | 17 May 1656 – 5 June 1656 | | Age 71/71 |
| 102 | | Bertuccio Valier (1 July 1596 – 29 March 1658) | 15 June 1656 – 29 March 1658 | | Age 59/61 |
| 103 | | Giovanni Pesaro (1 September 1589 – 30 September 1659) | 8 April 1658 – 30 September 1659 | | Age 68/70 |
| 104 | | Domenico II Contarini (28 January 1585 – 26 January 1675) | 16 October 1659 – 26 January 1675 | | Age 74/89 |
| 105 | | Nicolò Sagredo (8 December 1606 – 14 August 1676) | 6 February 1675 – 14 August 1676 | | Age 68/69 |
| 106 | | Alvise Contarini (24 October 1601 – 15 January 1684) | 26 August 1676 – 15 January 1684 | | Age 74/82 |
| 107 | | Marcantonio Giustinian (2 March 1619 – 23 March 1688) | 26 January 1684 – 23 March 1688 | | Age 64/69 |
| 108 | | Francesco Morosini (26 February 1619 – 16 January 1694) | 3 April 1688 – 16 January 1694 | | Age 69/74 |
| 109 | | Silvestro Valier (28 March 1630 – 7 July 1700) | 25 February 1694 – 7 July 1700 | | Age 63/70 |
| 110 | | Alvise II Mocenigo (3 January 1628 – 6 May 1709) | 17 July 1700 – 6 May 1709 | | Age 72/81 |
| 111 | | Giovanni II Cornaro (4 August 1647 – 12 August 1722) | 22 May 1709 – 12 August 1722 | | Age 61/75 |
| 112 | | Sebastiano Mocenigo (29 August 1662 – 21 May 1732) | 24 August 1722 – 21 May 1732 | | Age 59/69 |
| 113 | | Carlo Ruzzini (11 November 1653 – 5 January 1735) | 6 June 1732 – 5 January 1735 | | Age 78/81 |
| 114 | | Alvise Pisani (1 January 1664 – 17 June 1741) | 17 January 1735 – 17 June 1741 | | Age 71/77 |
| 115 | | Pietro Grimani (5 October 1677 – 7 March 1752) | 30 June 1741 – 7 March 1752 | | Age 63/74 |
| 116 | | Francesco Loredan (9 February 1685 – 19 May 1762) | 18 March 1752 – 19 May 1762 | | Age 67/77 |
| 117 | | Marco Foscarini (4 February 1696 – 31 March 1763) | 31 May 1762 – 31 March 1763 | | Age 66/67 |
| 118 | | Alvise Giovanni Mocenigo (19 May 1701 – 31 December 1778) | 19 April 1763 – 31 December 1778 | | Age 61/77 |
| 119 | | Paolo Renier (21 November 1710 – 13 February 1789) | 14 January 1779 – 13 February 1789 | | Age 68/78 |
| 120 | | Ludovico Manin (14 May 1725 – 24 October 1802) | 10 March 1789 – 12 May 1797 | | Forced to abdicate by Napoleon. Age 63/71 at abdication/77 at death |

== Legacy ==
After the Fall of the Republic of Venice, the position of Doge was abolished. Instead, from 1806 to 1866, a Podestà of Venice was appointed by the rulers of the city: Napoleon and the Habsburgs.

In 1860, the nascent Kingdom of Italy created the office of the Mayor of Venice (Sindaco di Venezia), chosen by the City council.

From 1946 to 1993, the Mayor of Venice was chosen by the City Council. Since 1993, under provisions of new local administration law, the Mayor of Venice has been chosen by popular election, originally every four and, later, every five years.

== Sources ==
- Cosentino, Salvatore, ed. (2021). A Companion to Byzantine Italy. Boston-Leiden: Brill.
- Gasparri, Stefano (2018). "The First Dukes and the Origins of Venice". Venice and Its Neighbors from the 8th to 11th Century: Through Renovation and Continuity. Leiden-Boston: Brill. pp. 5–26.
- Nicol, Donald M. (1992) [1988]. Byzantium and Venice: A Study in Diplomatic and Cultural Relations (2. ed.). Cambridge: Cambridge University Press.
- Norwich, John J. (1982). A History of Venice. New York: Knopf.
- Pazienza, Annamaria (2018). "Archival Documents as Narrative: The Sources of the Istoria Veneticorum and the Plea of Rižana". Venice and Its Neighbors from the 8th to 11th Century: Through Renovation and Continuity. Leiden-Boston: Brill. pp. 27–50.
- Skoblar, Magdalena, ed. (2021). Byzantium, Venice and the Medieval Adriatic: Spheres of Maritime Power and Influence, c. 700-1453. Cambridge: Cambridge University Press.
