= Jovian Ceparius =

Byzantine magister militum per Venetiae

Jovian, surnamed Hypatus or Ceparius (Italian: Gioviano Ceparico Ipato), was Byzantine magister militum per Venetiae in charge of the duchy of Venice in 740. Following the murder of the doge Orso Ipato in 737, the Exarch of Ravenna imposed administration by annual magistri militum on Venice who replaced the doge. Jovian was the fourth of these officials. This period of government by magistri militum lasted until 742, when the fifth and last of such officials was deposed and the dogeship was restored.

Not much is known about Jovian. John the Deacon, who wrote the Chronicon Venetum et Gradense, in the early 11th century, said that he ruled wisely. He called him the ipato named Jovianus. This indicates that he had the title of hypatos. This was a Byzantine honorary title which roughly meant first among the consuls. During his government there was a violent clash between the town of Heraclia and neighbour and rival Equilium.

Political offices
| Preceded by Teodato Ipato | Magister militum per Venetiae; 741 | Succeeded by Giovanni Fabriciaco |
