= 755 =

Calendar year

755 in various calendars
Gregorian calendar	755; DCCLV
Ab urbe condita	1508
Armenian calendar	204; ԹՎ ՄԴ
Assyrian calendar	5505
Balinese saka calendar	676–677
Bengali calendar	161–162
Berber calendar	1705
Buddhist calendar	1299
Burmese calendar	117
Byzantine calendar	6263–6264
Chinese calendar	甲午年 (Wood Horse); 3452 or 3245 — to — 乙未年 (Wood Goat); 3453 or 3246
Coptic calendar	471–472
Discordian calendar	1921
Ethiopian calendar	747–748
Hebrew calendar	4515–4516
- Hindu calendars
Vikram Samvat	811–812
Shaka Samvat	676–677
Kali Yuga	3855–3856
Holocene calendar	10755
Iranian calendar	133–134
Islamic calendar	137–138
Japanese calendar	Tenpyō-shōhō 7 (天平勝宝７年)
Javanese calendar	649–650
Julian calendar	755; DCCLV
Korean calendar	3088
Minguo calendar	1157 before ROC 民前1157年
Nanakshahi calendar	−713
Seleucid era	1066/1067 AG
Thai solar calendar	1297–1298
Tibetan calendar	ཤིང་ཕོ་རྟ་ལོ་ (male Wood-Horse); 881 or 500 or −272 — to — ཤིང་མོ་ལུག་ལོ་ (female Wood-Sheep); 882 or 501 or −271

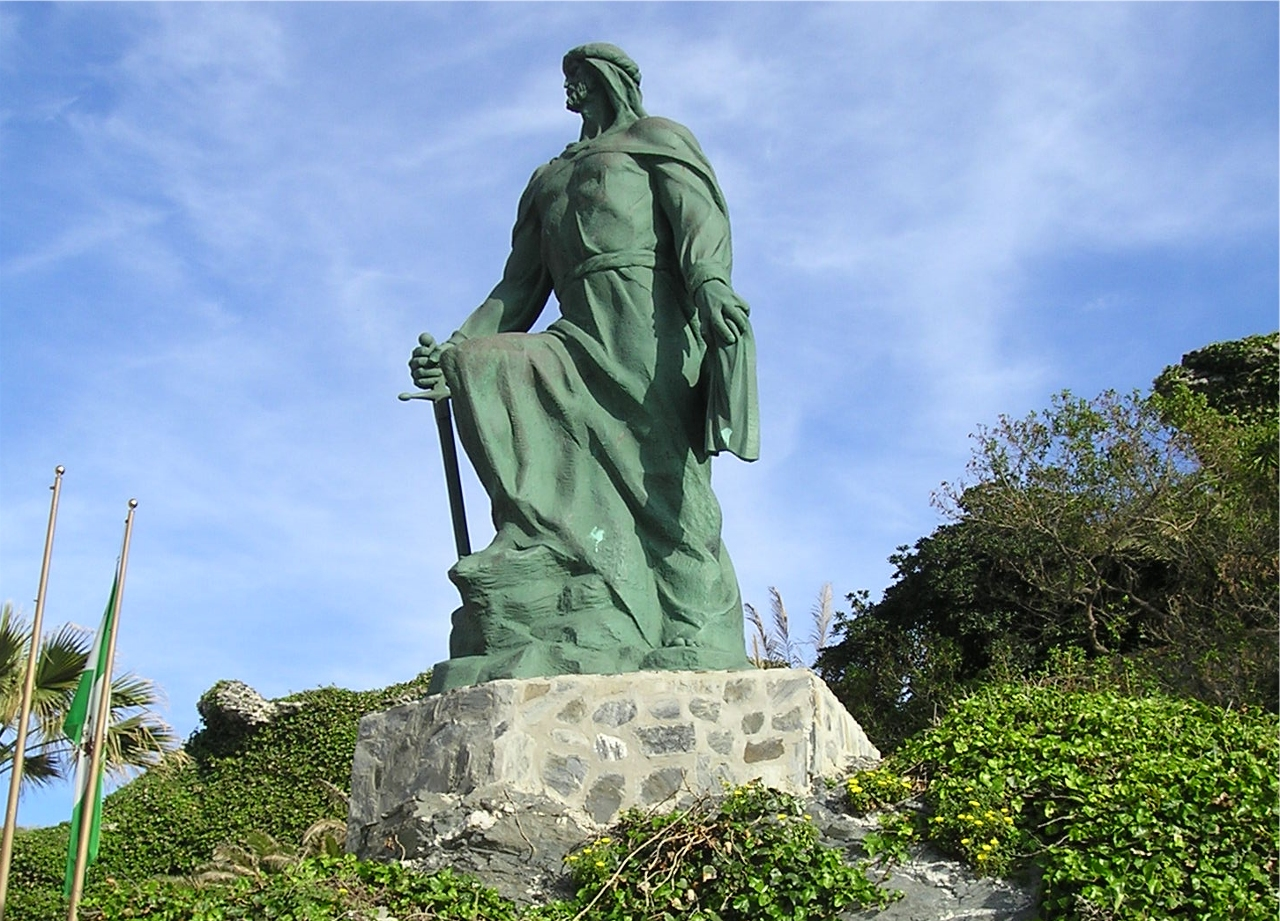
Statue of Abd al-Rahman I (731–788)

Year 755 (DCCLV) was a common year starting on Wednesday of the Julian calendar. The denomination 755 for this year has been used since the early medieval period, when the Anno Domini calendar era became the prevalent method in Europe for naming years.

== Events ==
=== By place ===
==== Europe ====
- September – Abd al-Rahman I, a member of the Umayyad Dynasty, lands at Almuñécar in al-Andalus (modern Spain), where over the next years he will establish the Emirate of Córdoba.
- Teodato Ipato is deposed and blinded, after a 13-year reign. He is succeeded by Galla Gaulo, who usurps the ducal throne of Venice.

==== Britain ====
- The Anglo-Saxon Chronicle's description under this date (now dated 757), of King Sigeberht of Wessex being deposed by Cynewulf, is notably fuller than earlier entries.

==== Asia ====
- December 16 – General An Lushan begins the Anshi Rebellion against Emperor Xuan Zong of the Tang Dynasty (China). His army surges down from Fanyang (near modern Beijing), and moves rapidly along the Grand Canal. Meanwhile, Xuan Zong sends Feng Changqing, governor of Fanyang, to build up defenses at the eastern capital of Luoyang.
- Trisong Detsen becomes emperor of Tibet. During his reign he plays a pivotal role in the introduction of Buddhism, and the establishment of the Nyingma or "Ancient" school of Tibetan Buddhism.
- Empress Kōken introduces the Tanabata festival to Japan.

==== Central America ====
- November 8 – K'ahk' Ukalaw Chan Chaak is installed as the new ruler of the Mayan city state of Naranjo in Guatemala and reigns until his death in 780.
- Alliances and trade between Mayan city-states have begun to break down. Malnutrition is on the rise. A diminishing of the food supply creates social upheaval and war (approximate date).

== Births ==
- Bello of Carcassonne, Frankish noble (approximate date)
- Wala of Corbie, Frankish noble (approximate date)
- William of Gellone, Frankish noble (approximate date)

== Deaths ==
- Abd al-Rahman ibn Habib al-Fihri, Arab noble
- Abu Muslim Khorasani, Persian general
- Elisedd ap Gwylog, king of Powys (Wales)
- Sunpadh, Persian rebel leader
- Zhang Xuan, Chinese painter (b. 713)
