= John Fabriacus =

Byzantine magister militum per Venetiae in charge of Venice

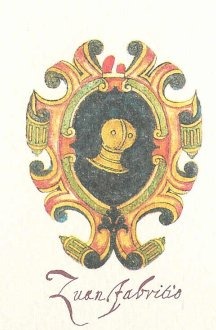
Coat of Arms of John Fabriacus

John Fabriacus (Giovanni Fabriciaco in Italian) was a Byzantine magister militum per Venetiae in charge of the duchy of Venice in 742. Following the murder of the doge Orso Ipato in 737, the Exarch of Ravenna imposed administration by annual magistri militum on Venice who replaced the doge. John was the fifth and last of these officials.

John's rule was particularly harsh. He sided with Heraclea in its conflict with its neighbour and rival Equilium during a violent clash between the two towns. He was deposed, and then, following a Byzantine custom, blinded and, finally, exiled. The Exarch of Ravenna allowed the resumption of the dogeship and the popular assembly elected Teodato Ipato, who was the son of Orso Ipato (the first historical doge) and who had been a magister militum three years earlier.

Because administration by the magistri militum was a relatively short interruption of the dogeship, this period is often referred to as an interregnum.

Political offices
Preceded by Jovian Ceparius	Magister militum per Venetiae; 742	Succeeded by Teodato Ipato as doge
