= Felice Cornicola =

Byzantine magister militum per Venetiae of Venice

Felice Cornicola (Latin: Felix Cornicula), also Felicius, was a Byzantine magister militum per Venetiae of Venice in 739. Following the murder of the doge Orso Ipato in 737, the Exarchate of Ravenna imposed administration by annual magistri militum on Venice, replacing the doge.

Cornicola was the second magister militum. Its first incumbent was Domenico Leoni. Cornicola was succeeded by Teodato Ipato. This period of government by magistri militum lasted until 742, when the fifth and last of such officials was deposed and the dogeship was restored.

Originally a citizen of Malamocco, he was described as being a mild and unassuming man whose tenure as magister militum was marked by justness and moderation. He is said to have become so popular with his subjects that he was able to freely and without challenge rescind the sentence of exile against Teodato Ipato, which had been issued soon after the assassination of his father Orso Ipato. Once his twelve-month term had reached its end, Felicius was succeeded as magister militum by Teodato himself, he having gained the favour of the electors since being recalled from exile.

== Notes ==
Political offices
Preceded by Domenico Leoni	Magister militum per Venetiae; 739	Succeeded by Teodato Ipato
