= Maurizio Galbaio =

Doge of Venice from 764 to 787

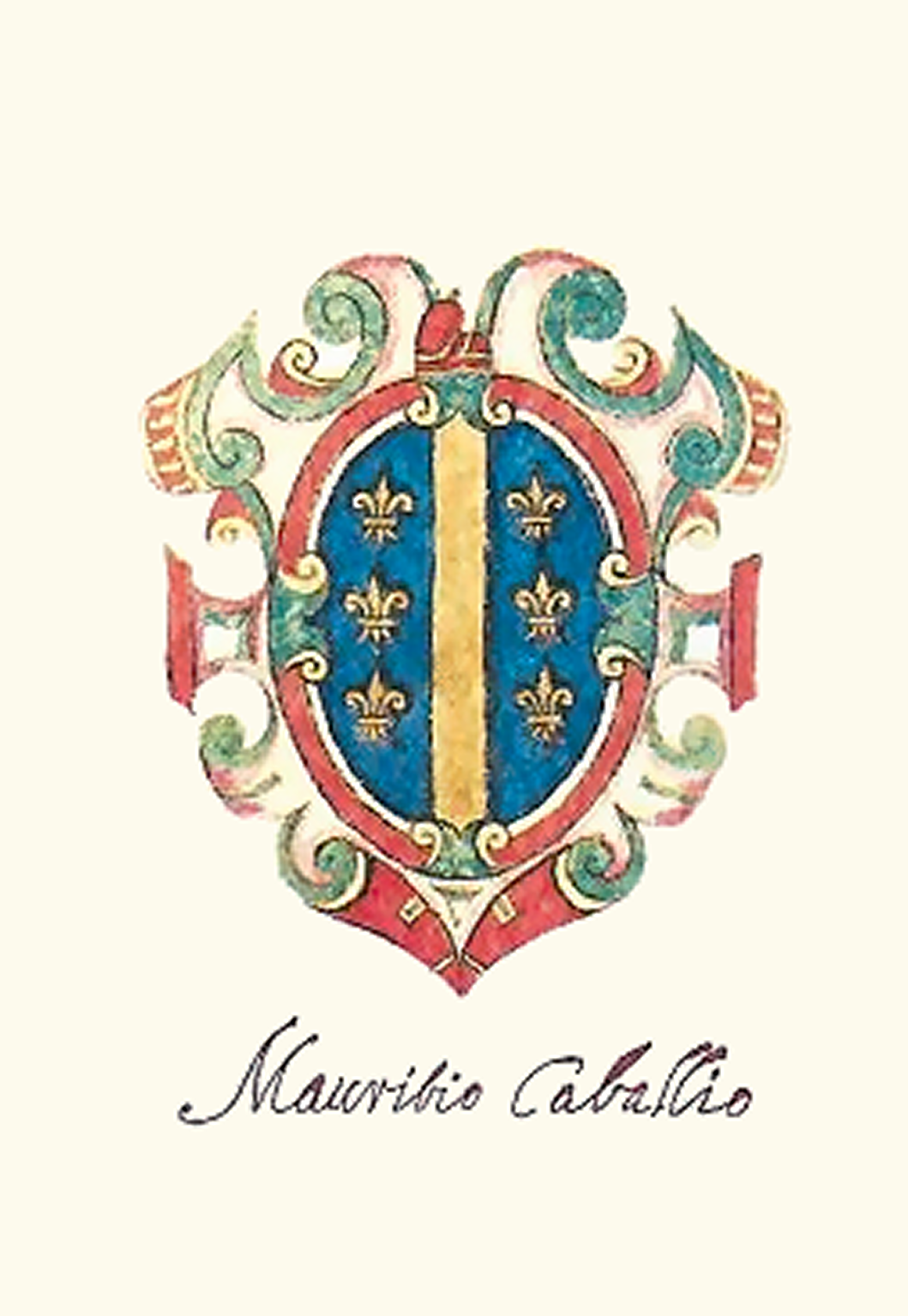
- Coat of arms of Maurizio Galbajo

7th Doge of Venice
- In office 764–787
- Preceded by: Domenico Monegario
- Succeeded by: Giovanni Galbaio

Personal details
- Born: Unknown Civitas Nova Heracliana
- Died: 787

Maurizio Galbaio (Latin: Mauricius Galba) (died 787) was the seventh traditional, but fifth historical, Doge of Venice from 764 to his death. He is considered to be the first great doge, who reigned for 22 years and set Venice on its path to independence and success.

== History ==
Maurizio was originally from Civitas Nova Heracliana and was a member of the possessores class. According to Giovanni Diacono (who was writing in the 10th and 11th centuries), he stood out as an expert in governance. Maurizio's election took place without disputes, and he was raised to the dogeship in Malamocco in 764.

Maurizio was raised to the dogeship at a time when two tribunes were being elected annually to check the power of the doge. His predecessor had been from a pro-Lombard faction, but Maurizio was a wealthy man from pro-Byzantine Heraclea. He opposed both the strong republican faction, which supported moving towards de facto independence, and the pro-Frankish and pro-Lombard factions. He received the titles of magister militum and hypatos from the Emperor Leo IV. During his reign, Maurizio oversaw an expansion of the ducal authority, from a bureaucratic-military function into a more autonomous authority.

The Lombard king Desiderius, in light of the alliance between the papacy and the Frankish king Charlemagne and the strong clerical support for Frankish hegemony in Venice, ravaged the states of the church and Istria, even capturing the doge's son Giovanni. Through the pope, Maurizio sent ambassadors to Charlemagne and his son was released. Maurizio then made the first of many subsequent attempts to create a hereditary dogeship when, in 778, he had his son made a second doge. Maurizio obtained the consent of the emperor of the East for this last act.

During Maurizio's final eleven years, the Venetians expanded permanently to the Rialto islands. On the little island of Olivolo (now Castello), he reconsecrated the church of Saints Sergius and Bacchus as that of St Peter. It was raised to episcopal status and was the cathedral of Venice throughout the republican era. The low point of Maurizio's reign was the expulsion from the Pentapolis of Venetian traders for trading in slaves and eunuchs.

Maurizio was succeeded by his son on his death. His name, Galbaio, came from his reputed descent from the ancient Roman emperor Galba.

== Sources ==
- Norwich, John Julius. A History of Venice. Alfred A. Knopf: New York, 1982.

Political offices
Preceded by Domenico Monegario	Doge of Venice; 764–787	Succeeded by Giovanni Galbaio
