= Alvise Pisani =

Doge of Venice from 1735 to 1741

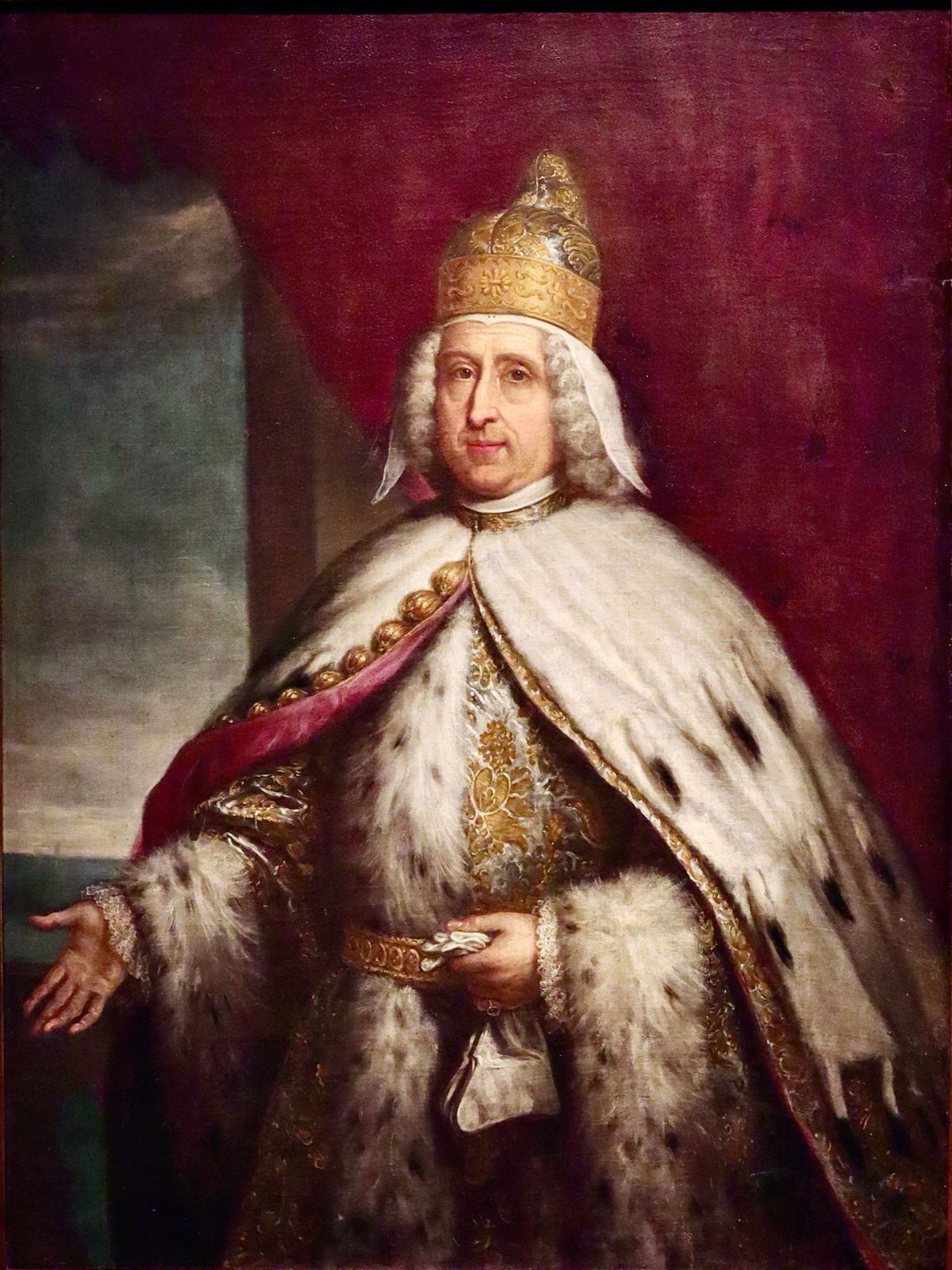

Doge of Venice
- Reign: 17 January 1735 – 17 June 1741
- Predecessor: Carlo Ruzzini
- Successor: Pietro Grimani
- Born: 1 January 1664; Venice, Republic of Venice
- Died: 17 June 1741 (aged 77); Venice, Republic of Venice
- Spouse: Elena Badoero
- Religion: Roman Catholicism
- Occupation: Diplomat

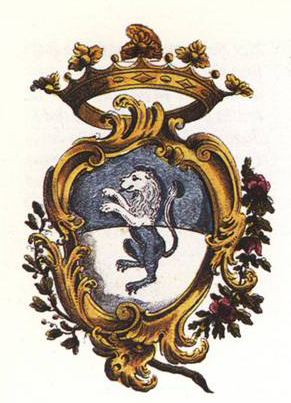
Coat of arms of the House of Pisani

Alvise Pisani (1 January 1664 in Venice – 17 June 1741 in Venice) was the 114th Doge of Venice, serving from 17 January 1735 until his death. Born as a member of the Pisani family, he was a career diplomat prior to his election, serving as Venice's ambassador to France, Austria, and Spain; he also served as a councillor to previous Doges. He was succeeded as Doge by Pietro Grimani. His dogaressa was Elena Badoero.

Political offices
Preceded by Carlo Ruzzini	Doge of Venice; 1735–1741	Succeeded by Pietro Grimani
