= Teodato Ipato =

Doge of Venice from 742 to 755

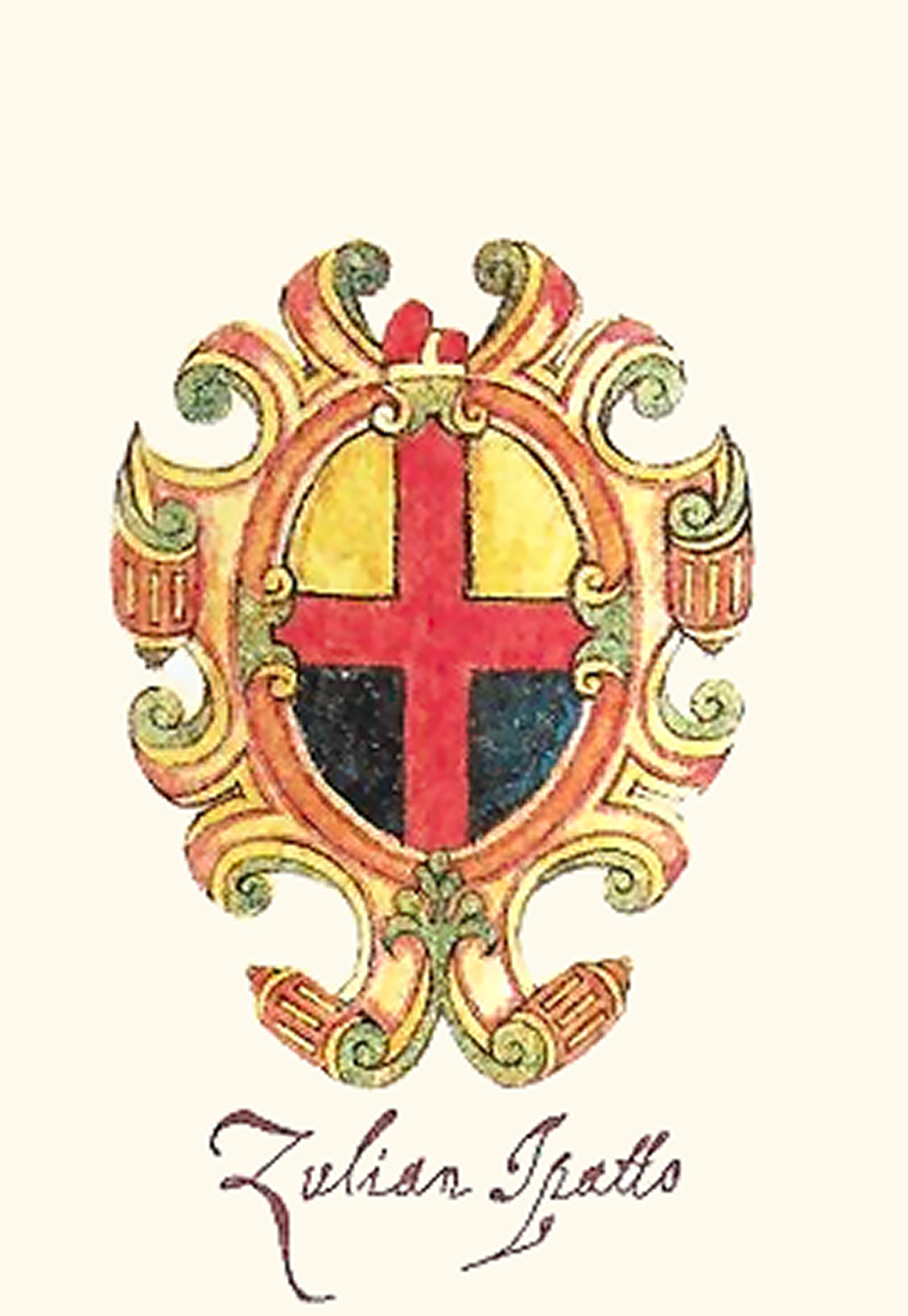
- Coat of arms of Doge Teodato Ipato

4th Doge of Venice
- In office 742–755
- Preceded by: Orso Ipato
- Succeeded by: Galla Gaulo

4th Magister Militum per Venetiae
- In office 739–739

Personal details
- Born: Teodato Ipato; Unknown Heraclea
- Died: 755 Venice
- Parent: Orso Ipato

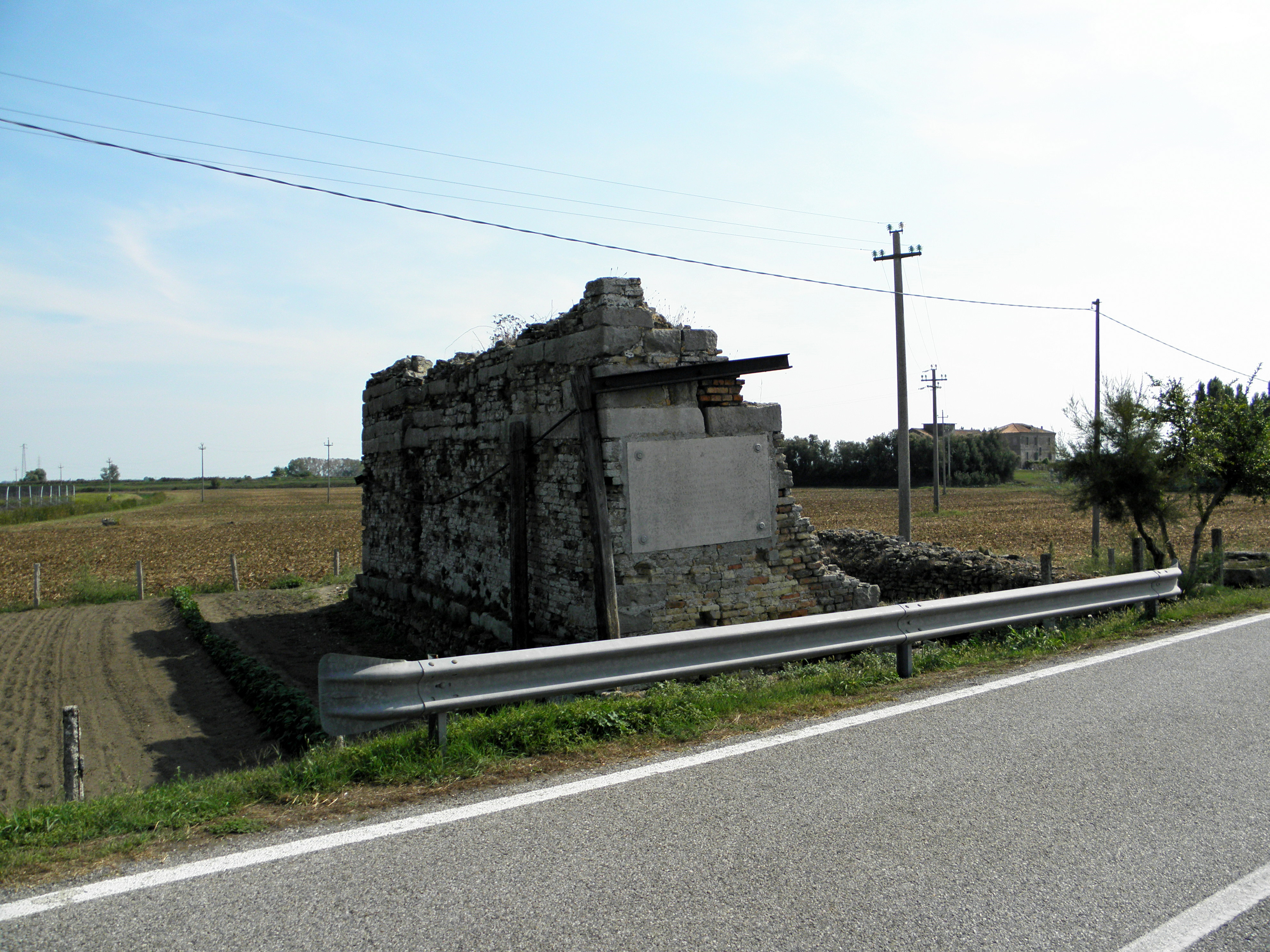
Bebe Tower in Chioggia, built by Teodato Ipato.

Teodato Ipato (also Diodato or Deusdedit; Latin: Theodatus Hypatus) was Doge of Venice from 742 to 755. With his election came the restoration of the dogato, which had been defunct since the assassination of his father, Orso Ipato. Before his election he had served as magister militum in 739.

Teodato was the son of Doge Orso Ipato. He was condemned to exile in 737 in the wake of his father's murder, which came perhaps as a complication of a civil conflict between Eraclea and Equilio. The office of doge was subsequently abolished in favour of a magister militum, denoting in this case a chief magistrate to be replaced yearly.

The first to be installed in this role was Domenico Leoni, who at the end of his twelve-month term was replaced by Felicius Cornicola. It was under Felicius' administration that Teodato was recalled from exile.

After returning home, Teodato is said to have gained the favour of the Venetian electors, and in 739, he was thus selected as Felicius Cornicola's successor. At the end of his term he was himself replaced by Jovian Ceparius, having failed to procure re-election; and Jovian, at his term's end, was succeeded by Giovanni Fabriciaco, who took office in 741.

Fabriciaco's appointment would prove disastrous: some months into his term an uprising took hold, and consequently he was ousted from office, blinded, and driven into exile. Most historians put this at around 742. Teodato, said to have been complicit in Fabriciaco's downfall, was later by popular vote appointed Doge, marking the end of the interregnum which had lasted from 737 to 42.

Under Teodato, Venice's seat of government was moved from Eraclea to Malamocco. Also during his reign came the renewal of an age-old treaty with the Lombards, first composed in the reign of Paolo Lucio Anafesto, and an earthquake which is said to have flooded parts of Venice. His reign came to an end in 755 when he was deposed and blinded at the instigation of Galla Gaulo, who was subsequently elected Doge.

An alternative view of Teodato's fate, as described in Hazlitt's History of the Venetian Republic, is that rather than being blinded and deposed, he was instead murdered by adherents of Galla Gaulo.

== Sources ==
- Norwich, John Julius. A History of Venice. Penguin, 2012.
- Hazlitt, William Carew. History of the Venetian Republic: Her Rise, Her Greatness, and Her Civilization. Elder, Smith and Co.: London, 1860.
- Hodgson, Francis Cotterell. The early history of Venice, from the foundation to the conquest of Constantinople, A.D. 1204. George Allen: London, 1901.

Political offices
Preceded by Felicius Cornicola	Magister militum per Venetiae; 739	Succeeded by Jovian Ceparius
Vacant Interregnum Title last held by Orso Ipato	Doge of Venice; 742–755	Succeeded by Galla Gaulo
