= Domenico Monegario =

Doge of the Republic of Venice from 756 to 764

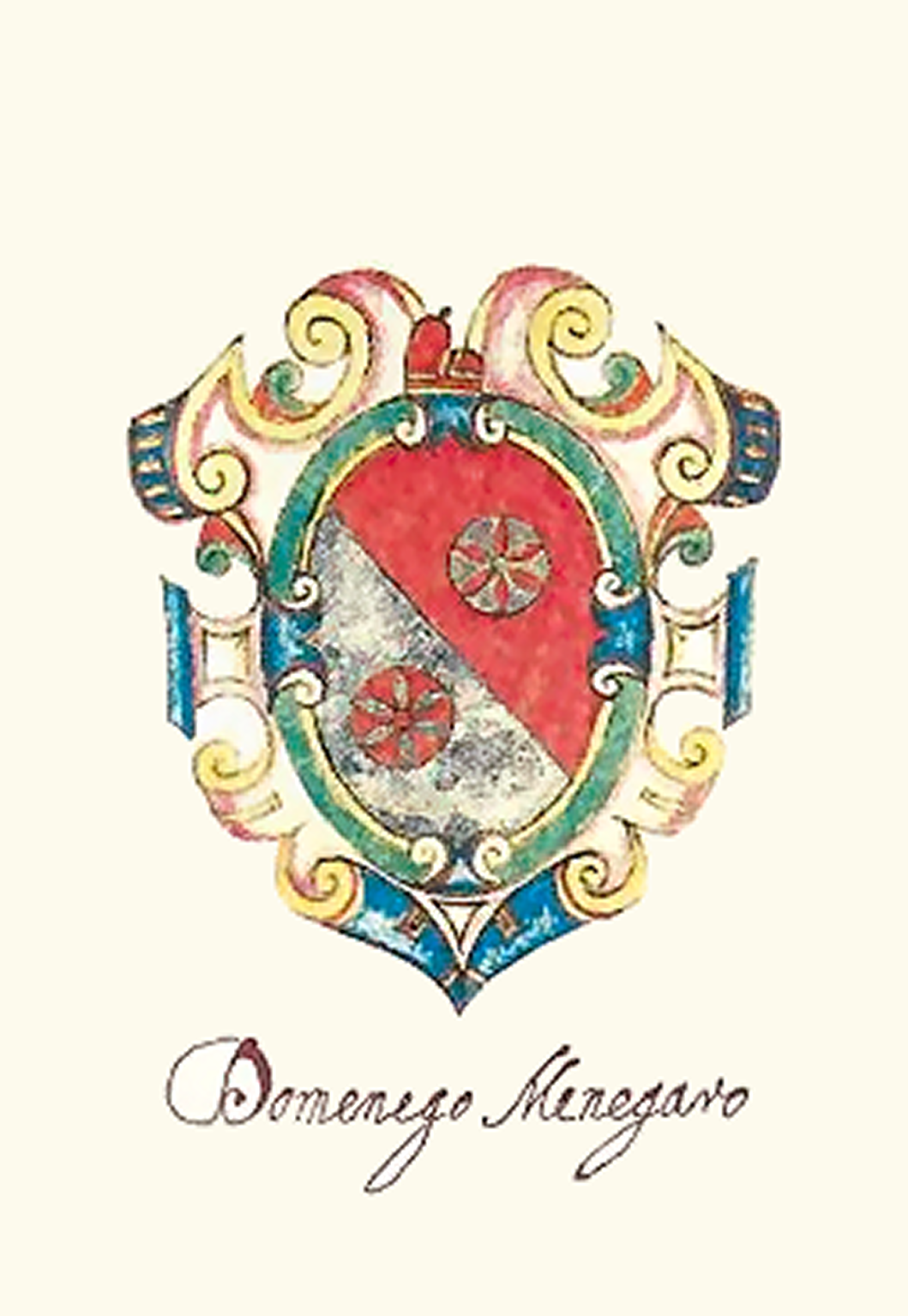
- Coat of arms of Domenico Menegario

6th Doge of Venice
- In office 756–764
- Preceded by: Galla Gaulo
- Succeeded by: Maurizio Galbaio

Personal details
- Born: Unknown
- Died: 764

Domenico Monegario was the traditional sixth Doge of Venice (756–764).

== History ==
He was elected with the support of the Lombard king Desiderius. However, in order to maintain necessary good relations with Byzantium and the Franks, two tribunes were elected annually to limit ducal power. Domenico came to resent these checks and was removed after eight years.

During his reign, the transformation of the Venetians from fishermen to marine traders happened, with audacious travels as far as the Ionian Islands and the Levant. The art of shipbuilding was improved to make sturdier, faster ships. Venetian wealth increased via trade and the city took on the medieval character it held for the next millennium.

When Pope Paul I demanded donations from Venice to the Holy See, the Doge Monegario was deposed, blinded, and exiled as his two predecessors had been.

The surname Monegario may derive from monegarium, that is, a friar or monk, or monetarium, that is, a minter.

== Sources ==
- Norwich, John Julius. A History of Venice. Alfred A. Knopf: New York, 1982.

Political offices
Preceded by Galla Gaulo	Doge of Venice; 756–764	Succeeded by Maurizio Galbaio
