= Domenico Leoni =

Byzantine magister militum per Venetiae in charge of Venice

Domenico Leoni (Latin: Dominicus Leo Abrogatis; life dates unknown) was a Byzantine magister militum per Venetiae in charge of Venice in 738. Following the murder of the doge Orso Ipato in 737, the Exarch of Ravenna imposed administration by annual magistri militum on Venice. Domenico was the first of these officials. He was succeeded by Felice Cornicola. This period of government by magistri militum lasted until 742, when the fifth and last of such officials was deposed and the dogeship was restored.

== Notes ==
Political offices
Preceded by Orso Ipato	Magister militum per Venetiae; 738	Succeeded by Felice Cornicola
