= Pietro Grimani =

Doge of Venice from 1741 to 1752

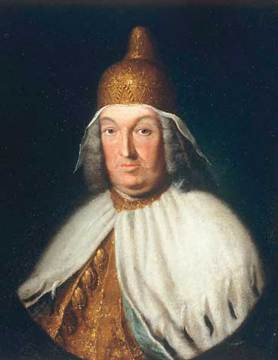
- Portrait by Bartolomeo Nazari

Doge of Venice
- In office 1741–1752
- Preceded by: Alvise Pisani
- Succeeded by: Francesco Loredan

Personal details
- Born: 5 October 1677 Venice, Republic of Venice
- Died: 7 March 1752 (aged 74) Venice

Pietro Grimani (October 5, 1677 in Venice – March 7, 1752 in Venice) was a Venetian statesman and aristocrat who served as the 115th Doge of Venice from June 30, 1741, until his death. Grimani was born a member of the Grimani family. He was a cultured and learned man, who wrote poetry and counted among his acquaintances Isaac Newton, whom he had met while serving as a diplomat in England. He was succeeded as Doge by Francesco Loredan. Pietro Grimani was the castellanus of coron and modon. The Venitian senate gave regions like Monemvasia to Grimani but Grimani family was not able to gain full control.

Political offices
Preceded by Alvise Pisani	Doge of Venice; 1741–1752	Succeeded by Francesco Loredan
