= Laguna del Mort =

Lake in Veneto, Italy

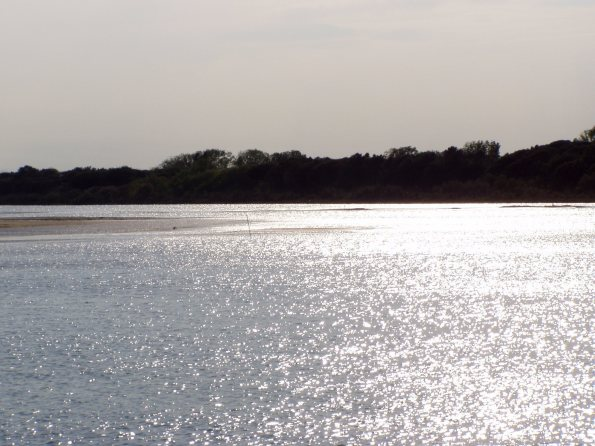
- view of Laguna del Mort Lake

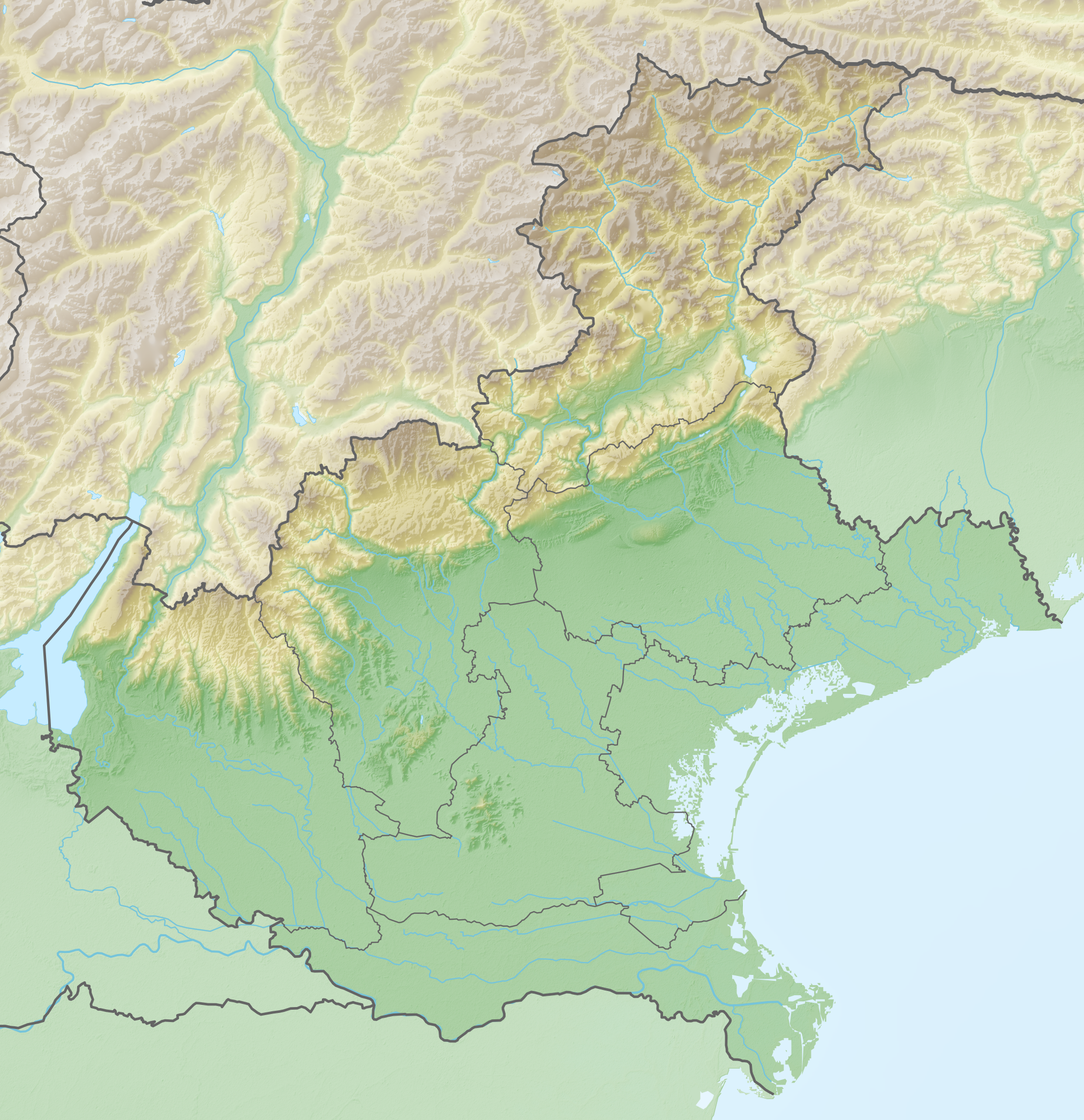
- Location within Veneto
- Location: Province of Venezia, Veneto
- Coordinates: 45.539121°N 12.74693°E
- Primary inflows: ocean
- Primary outflows: ocean
- Basin countries: Italy
- Surface area: 2.1 km^{2} (0.81 sq mi)

Laguna del Mort is a lake in the Province of Venezia, Veneto, Italy. Its surface area is 2.1 km². The pinewood around this lagoon has a lush vegetation: different kinds of flowers and trees live here. Wildlife is also rich: birds, insects, small mammals, reptiles and amphibians.

In Summer a lot of nudists come to the beach which has been a nudist place for over 30 years.
