= Galla Gaulo =

Doge of Venice from 755 to 756

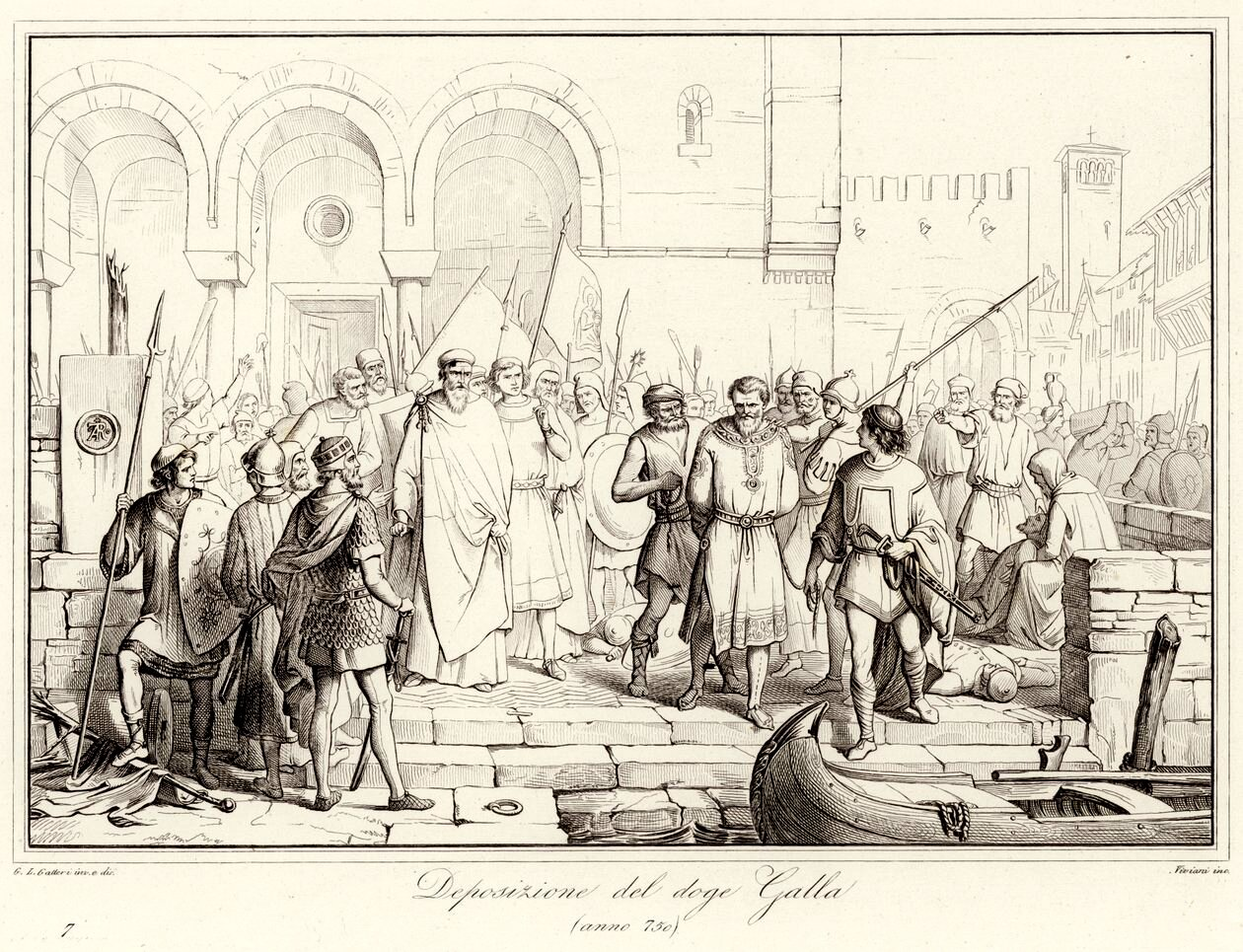
- Fanciful 19th-century depiction of Galla's deposition, by Giuseppe Lorenzo Gatteri

5th Doge of Venice
- In office 755–756
- Preceded by: Teodato Ipato
- Succeeded by: Domenico Monegario

Personal details
- Born: Unknown
- Died: 756

Galla Gaulo or Galla Lupanio was the fifth traditional Doge of Venice (755–756).

== History ==
Gaulo was elected to the throne after deposing and blinding his predecessor, Teodato Ipato. He came to power at a time when there were three clear factions in Venice: the pro-Byzantine faction supported a strong doge and close political relations with the Byzantine Empire; the pro-Frankish party supported moving closer to the new Carolingian dynasty (enemies of Lombards and Greeks); and the republican party wished to assert as much independence as possible and to remain outside any larger power's sphere of influence. Galla was probably pro-Frankish.

He barely survived on the throne for a year before he was deposed, blinded, and exiled as Teodato had been. He is regarded as the traditional founder of the Barozzi family.

== Sources ==
- Norwich, John Julius. A History of Venice. Alfred A. Knopf: New York City, 1982.

Political offices
Preceded by Teodato Ipato	Doge of Venice; 755–756	Succeeded by Domenico Monegario
