= Magister militum =

Imperial Roman military office

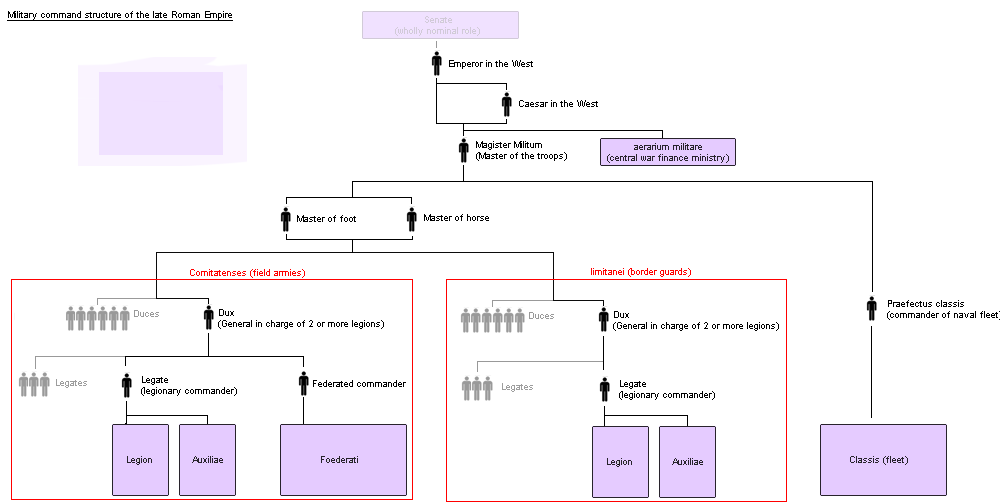
The original command structure of the late Roman army, with a separate magister equitum and a magister peditum in place of the later overall magister militum in the command structure of the army of the Western Roman Empire.

The high command structure of the West Roman army c. 410–425, based on the Notitia Dignitatum

Magister militum (Latin for "master of soldiers"; pl.: magistri militum) was a top-level military command used in the late Roman Empire, dating from the reign of Constantine the Great. The term referred to the senior military officer (equivalent to a war theatre commander, the emperor remaining the supreme commander) of the empire. The office continued to exist and evolve during the early Byzantine Empire. In Greek sources, the term is translated either as strategos or as stratelates (although these terms were also used non-technically to refer to commanders of different ranks).

== Establishment and development of the command ==
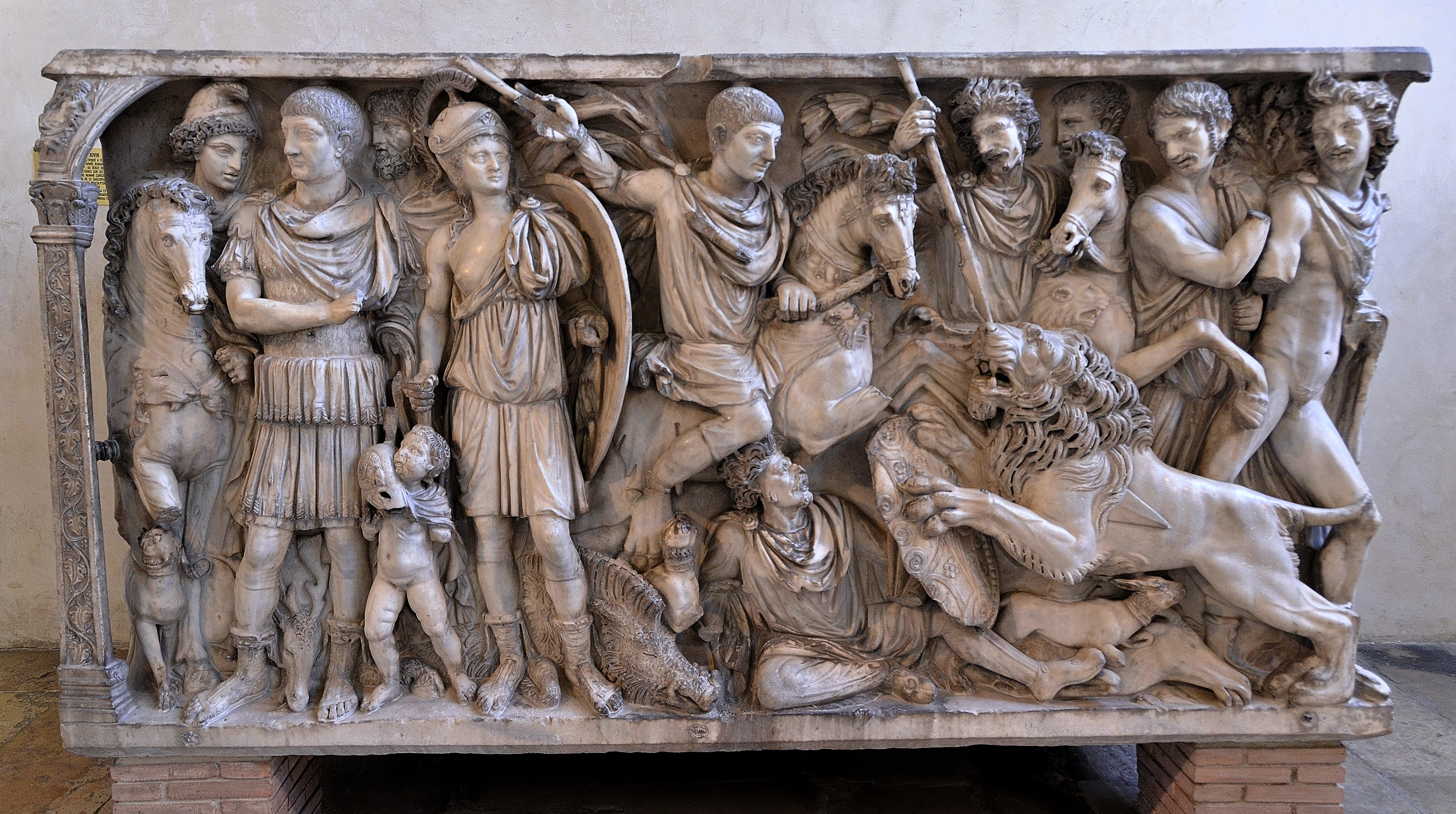
Iovinus was magister equitum from 361 to 369 under several Roman emperors, from Julian to Valentinian I. Accordingly, he had himself depicted on his richly decorated marble sarcophagus as a fighting equestrian general (centre). Musée Saint-Remi, Reims.

The office of magister militum was created in the early 4th century, most likely when the Western Roman emperor Constantine the Great defeated all other contemporary Roman emperors, which gave him control over their respective armies. Because the Praetorian Guards and their leaders, the Praetorian Prefects, had supported Constantine's enemy, Maxentius, he disbanded the Guard and deprived the Prefects of their military functions, reducing them to a purely civil office. To replace them, he created two posts: a commander of the infantry, the magister peditum ("master of foot"), and a more prestigious cavalry commander, the magister equitum ("master of horse"). These offices had precedents in the immediate imperial past, both in function and idea; the latter title had existed since republican times, as the second-in-command to a Roman dictator.

Under Constantine's successors, the titles were also established at a territorial level: magistri peditum and magistri equitum were appointed for every praetorian prefecture (per Gallias, per Italiam, per Illyricum, per Orientem), and, in addition, for Thrace and, sometimes, Africa. On occasion, the offices would be combined in a single person, then styled magister equitum et peditum or magister utriusque militiae ("master of both forces"). Overall, lower-level magistri were assigned according to circumstances, with varying numbers employed in a given area. Some were directly in command of the local mobile field army of the comitatenses, which acted as a rapid reaction force. Other magistri remained at the immediate disposal of the emperors, and by the late fourth century or early fifth century were termed in praesenti ("in the presence" of the emperor).

Over the course of the fourth century in the Western Roman Empire, the system of two imperial magistri remained largely intact, with usually one magister having paramount authority (such as Bauto or Merobaudes, the main power behind the appointment of emperor Valentinian II.) This tendency culminated in Arbogast, who inherited the position of western magister militum and used it to functionally usurp emperor Valentinian II, either killing him or driving him to suicide before appointing his own puppet emperor, Eugenius. In the west, the position (often under the title of magister utriusque militiae or MVM) remained very powerful until the formal end of the empire, and was held by Stilicho, Aetius, Ricimer, and others.

In the east, emperor Theodosius I (379–395) expanded the system of two magistri militum to include an additional three magistri. For a long time these generals were used in an ad hoc manner, being employed wherever they were needed. Eventually in the fifth century their positions became more firmly established, and there were two senior generals, who were each appointed to the office of magister militum praesentalis.

After the final partition of the Roman Empire in 395, the office continued to exist both in the Western and Eastern parts of the divided Empire. One of the most notable examples of prominence and increasing importance of that military office occurred with Marcellinus, who was magister militum in Dalmatia, acting not only as regional military commander, but also as effective governor in the entire region, from 454 to 468.

=== Continuation and evolution in the Byzantine Empire ===
The office of magister militum consequently evolved in nature and scope during the early Byzantine period.

During the reign of Emperor Justinian I (527–565), with increasing military threats and the expansion of the Byzantine Empire, the posts of the eastern generals were overhauled: the magister militum per Armeniam in the Armenian and Caucasian provinces, formerly part of the jurisdiction of the magister militum per Orientem, the magister militum per Africam in the reconquered African provinces (534), with a subordinate magister peditum, and the magister militum Spaniae (c. 562).

In the course of the 6th century, internal and external crises in the provinces often necessitated the temporary union of the supreme regional civil authority with the office of the magister militum. In the establishment of the exarchates of Ravenna and Carthage in 584, this practice found its first permanent expression. In various provinces of the Exarchate of Ravena, from Venetia to Naples, magistri militum were appointed both as local military commanders and provincial governors. For example, such was Mauricius, who was magister militum of Byzantine Venetia in 639.

After the loss of the eastern provinces to the Muslim conquest in the 640s, the surviving field armies and their commanders formed the first themata.

== Later, less formal use of the term ==
In later periods, various military commanders sometimes also took this title in medieval Italy, for example in the Papal States and in the Republic of Venice, whose Doge claimed to be the successor to the Exarch of Ravenna.

The term is referred to by Emperor Constantine VII in his De Administrando Imperio in a digression on 6th century Italian history, where he refers to mastromilis meaning 'captain-general of the army' in the 'Roman tongue'. By the time of writing in the mid-10th century working knowledge of Latin was mostly absent in the Byzantine imperial court.

By the 12th century, the term was being used to describe a man who organized the military force of a political or feudal leader on his behalf. In the Gesta Herwardi, the hero is several times described as magister militum by the man who translated the original Old English account into Medieval Latin. It seems possible that the writer of the original version, now lost, thought of him as the hereward' (Old English: here, lit. 'army' and no: weard, lit. 'guard') – the supervisor of the military force. That this later use of these terms was based on the classical concept seems clear.

== List of magistri militum ==
=== Unspecified commands ===
- 383–385/8: Bauto, magister militum under Valentinian II
- 385/8–394: Arbogast, magister militum under Valentinian II and Eugenius
- 383–388: Andragathius
- ?–480: Ovida

=== Comes et magister utriusque militiae ===
- 392–408: Stilicho
- 409–410: Alaric
- 411–421: Constantius (III)
- 422–425: Castinus
- 425–430: Felix
- 431–432: Bonifacius
- 432–433: Sebastianus
- 433–454: Aetius
- 456: Remistus
- 456: Messianus
- 456–472: Ricimer
- 472–473: Gundobad
- 474–475: Ecdicius
- 475–476: Orestes

=== Per Gallias ===
- 352–355: Claudius Silvanus
- 362–364: Jovinus, magister equitum under Julian and Jovian
- ?–419: Gaudentius
- 425–430: Aetius
- 435–439: Litorius
- 452–458: Agrippinus
- 458–461: Aegidius
- 461/462: Agrippinus
- 462-473: Gundioc
- ?–472: Bilimer

=== Per Hispanias ===
- 441–442: Astyrius
- 443: Merobaudes
- 446: Vitus

=== Per Ilyricum ===
- ?–350: Vetranio, magister peditum under Constans
- 361: Iovinus, magister equitum under Julian
- 365–375: Equitius, magister utriusquae militiae under Valentinian I
- 395–? Alaric I
- 448/9 Agintheus (known from Priscus to have held office as the latter's embassy proceeded towards the court of Attila).
- 468–474: Julius Nepos
- 477–479: Onoulphus
- 479–481: Sabinianus Magnus
- 528: Ascum
- 529–530/1: Mundus (1st time)
- 532–536: Mundus (2nd time)
- c. 538: Justin
- c. 544: Vitalius
- c. 550: John
- 568–569/70: Bonus
- 581–582: Theognis

=== Per Orientem ===
- c. 347: Flavius Eusebius, magister utriusquae militiae
- 349–359: Ursicinus, magister equitum under Constantius
- 359–360: Sabinianus, magister equitum under Constantius II
- 363–367: Lupicinus, magister equitum under Jovian and Valens
- 371–378: Iulius, magister equitum et Peditum under Valens
- 383: Richomeres, magister equitum et peditum
- 383–388: Ellebichus, magister equitum et peditum
- 392: Eutherius, magister equitum et peditum
- 393–396: Addaeus, magister equitum et peditum
- ?~399: Gainas
- 395/400: Fravitta
- 433–446: Anatolius
- 447–451: Zeno
- 460s: Ardabur Aspar
- –469: Iordanes
- 469–471: Zeno
- 483–498: Ioannes Scytha
- c. 503–505: Areobindus Dagalaiphus Areobindus
- 505–506: Pharesmanes
- ?516–?518: Hypatius
- ?518–529: Diogenianus
- 520–525/526: Hypatius
- 527: Libelarius
- 527–529: Hypatius
- 529–531: Belisarius
- 531: Mundus
- 532–533: Belisarius
- 540: Buzes
- 542: Belisarius
- 543–544: Martinus
- 549–551: Belisarius
- 555: Amantius
- 556: Valerianus
- 569: Zemarchus
- 572–573: Marcian
- 573: Theodorus
- 574: Eusebius
- 574/574–577: Justinian
- 577–582: Maurice
- 582–583: John Mystacon
- 584–587/588: Philippicus
- 588: Priscus
- 588–589: Philippicus
- 589–591: Comentiolus
- 591–603: Narses
- 603–604 Germanus
- 604–605 Leontius
- 605–610 Domentziolus
- 610 Comentiolus (brother of Phocas)
- 611-612 Priscus
- 612— Emperor Heraclius (locum tenens)

=== Per Armeniam ===
- Sittas
- Dorotheus (530–532)
- Peter, direct predecessor of John Tzibus
- John Tzibus (?–541)
- Valerian
- Dagisthaeus (?–550)
- Bessas (550–554)
- Martin
- Justin
- John Mystacon
- Heraclius the Elder (c. 595)

=== Per Thracias ===
- 377–378: Saturninus, magister equitum under Valens
- 377–378: Traianus, magister peditum under Valens
- 378: Sebastianus, magister peditum under Valens
- 380–383: Saturninus, magister peditum under Theodosius I
- 392–393: Stilicho, magister equitum et peditum
- 412–414: Constans
- 441: Ioannes the Vandal, magister utriusque militiae
- 464–467/468: Basiliscus
- 468–474: Armatus
- 474: Heraclius of Edessa
- 511: Hypatius
- 512–c. 513: Cyrillus
- c. 513–c. 515: Alathar
- 515: Vitalian
- 525-c. 530: Germanus
- 530–533: Chilbudius
- 550–c. 554: Artabanes
- 588: Priscus (1st time)
- 593: Priscus (2nd time)
- 593–594: Peter (1st time)
- 594–c. 598: Priscus (2nd time)
- 598–601: Comentiolus
- 601–602: Peter (2nd time)

=== Praesentalis ===
- 351–361: Arbitio, magister equitum under Constantius II
- 361–363: Nevitta, magister equitum under Julian
- 363–379: Victor, magister equitum under Valens
- 366–378: Arinthaeus, magister peditum under Valens
- 364–369: Iovinus, magister equitum under Valentinian I
- 364–366: Dagalaifus, magister peditum under Valentinian I
- 367–372: Severus, magister peditum under Valentinian I
- 369–373: Theodosius, magister equitum under Valentinian I
- 375–388: Merobaudes, magister peditum under Valentinian I, Gratian and Magnus Maximus
- 388–395: Timasius
- 394–408: Stilicho, magister equitum et peditum
- 399–400: Gainas
- 400: Fravitta
- 409: Varanes and Arsacius
- 419–: Plinta
- 434–449: Areobindus?
- 443–451: Apollonius
- 450–451: Anatolius
- 475–477/478: Armatus
- 485–: Longinus
- 492–499: John the Hunchback
- 518–520: Vitalian
- 520–?: Justinian
- 528: Leontius
- 528–529: Phocas
- 520–538/9: Sittas
- 536: Germanus
- 536: Maxentianus
- 546–548: Artabanes
- 548/9–552: Suartuas
- 562: Constantinianus
- 582: Germanus (uncertain)
- 585–c. 586: Comentiolus
- 626: Bonus (uncertain)

=== Per Africam ===
==== Western Empire ====
- 373–375: Theodosius, magister equitum
- 386–398: Gildo, magister equitum et peditum

==== Eastern Empire ====
- 534–536: Solomon
- 536–539: Germanus
- 539–544: Solomon
- 544–546: Sergius
- 545–546: Areobindus
- 546: Artabanes
- 546–552: John Troglita
- 578–590: Gennadius

=== In Byzantine Italy ===
==== Venetia ====
- Mauricius (639)
- 8th century: Marcellus
- 737: Domenico Leoni under Leo III
- 738: Felice Cornicola under Leo III
- 739: Theodatus Hypatus under Leo III
- 741: Ioannes Fabriacius under Leo III
- 764–787: Mauricius Galba

== See also ==
- Structural history of the Roman military

== Sources ==
- Bendle, Christopher (2024). The Office of "Magister Militum" in the 4th Century CE: A Study Into the Impact of Political and Military Leadership on the Later Roman Empire (PDF). Stuttgart: Steiner Franz Verlag. Archived from the original on 2025-06-14.
- Cosentino, Salvatore, ed. (2021). A Companion to Byzantine Italy. Boston-Leiden: Brill.
- Gelichi, Sauro; Gasparri, Stefano, eds. (2018). Venice and Its Neighbors from the 8th to 11th Century: Through Renovation and Continuity. Leiden-Boston: Brill.
- Martindale, John R.; Jones, A. H. M.; Morris, John, eds. (1971). The Prosopography of the Later Roman Empire: Volume I, AD 260–395. Cambridge: Cambridge University Press. ISBN 0-521-07233-6.
- Martindale, John R., ed. (1980). The Prosopography of the Later Roman Empire: Volume II, AD 395–527. Cambridge: Cambridge University Press. ISBN 0-521-20159-4.
- Martindale, John R., ed. (1992). The Prosopography of the Later Roman Empire: Volume III, AD 527–641. Cambridge: Cambridge University Press. ISBN 0-521-20160-8.
- Skoblar, Magdalena, ed. (2021). Byzantium, Venice and the Medieval Adriatic: Spheres of Maritime Power and Influence, c. 700-1453. Cambridge: Cambridge University Press.
- Wozniak, Frank E. (1981). "East Rome, Ravenna and Western Illyricum: 454-536 A.D." Historia: Zeitschrift für Alte Geschichte. 30 (3): 351–382.
- Prosopography of the Later Roman Empire (PLRE), Vols. I-III
