= Orso Ipato =

Doge of Venice from 726 to 737

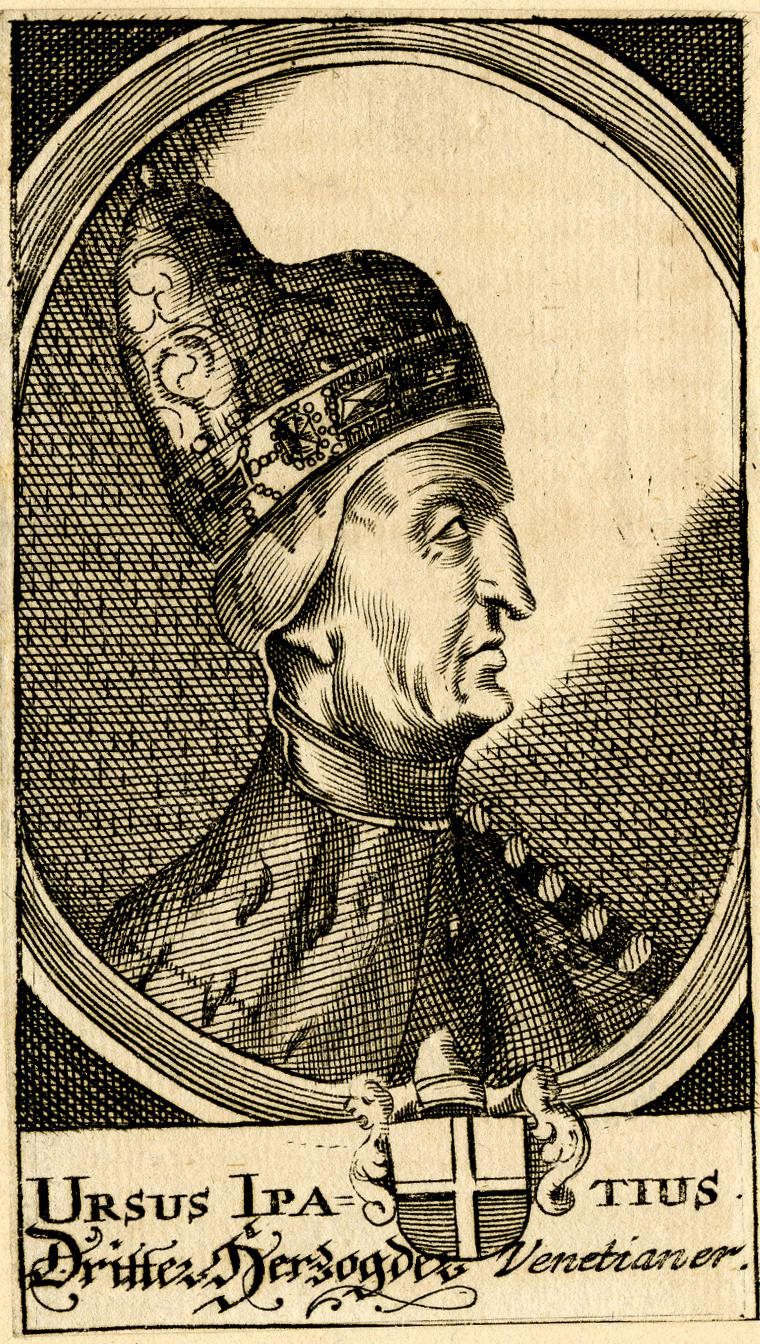
- Engraving of Orso by Johann Jakob Vogel (c. 1670-1690)

3rd Doge of Venice
- In office 726–737
- Preceded by: Marcello Tegalliano
- Succeeded by: Teodato Ipato

Personal details
- Born: Eraclea
- Died: 737 Venice, Republic of Venice

Orso Ipato (Latin: Ursus Hypatus; died 737) was, by tradition, the third Doge of Venice (726–737) and the first historically known. During his eleven-year reign, he brought great change to the Venetian navy, aided in the recapture of Ravenna from Lombard invaders, and cultivated harmonious relations with the Byzantine Empire. He was murdered in 737 during a civil conflict.

== History ==
A native of Eraclea, Orso was elected Doge in 726 following the death of Marcello Tegalliano. The Venetian people had elected him against the will of the Byzantine Empire, a consequence of the Byzantines' unwelcome attempts to institute iconoclasm in the West.

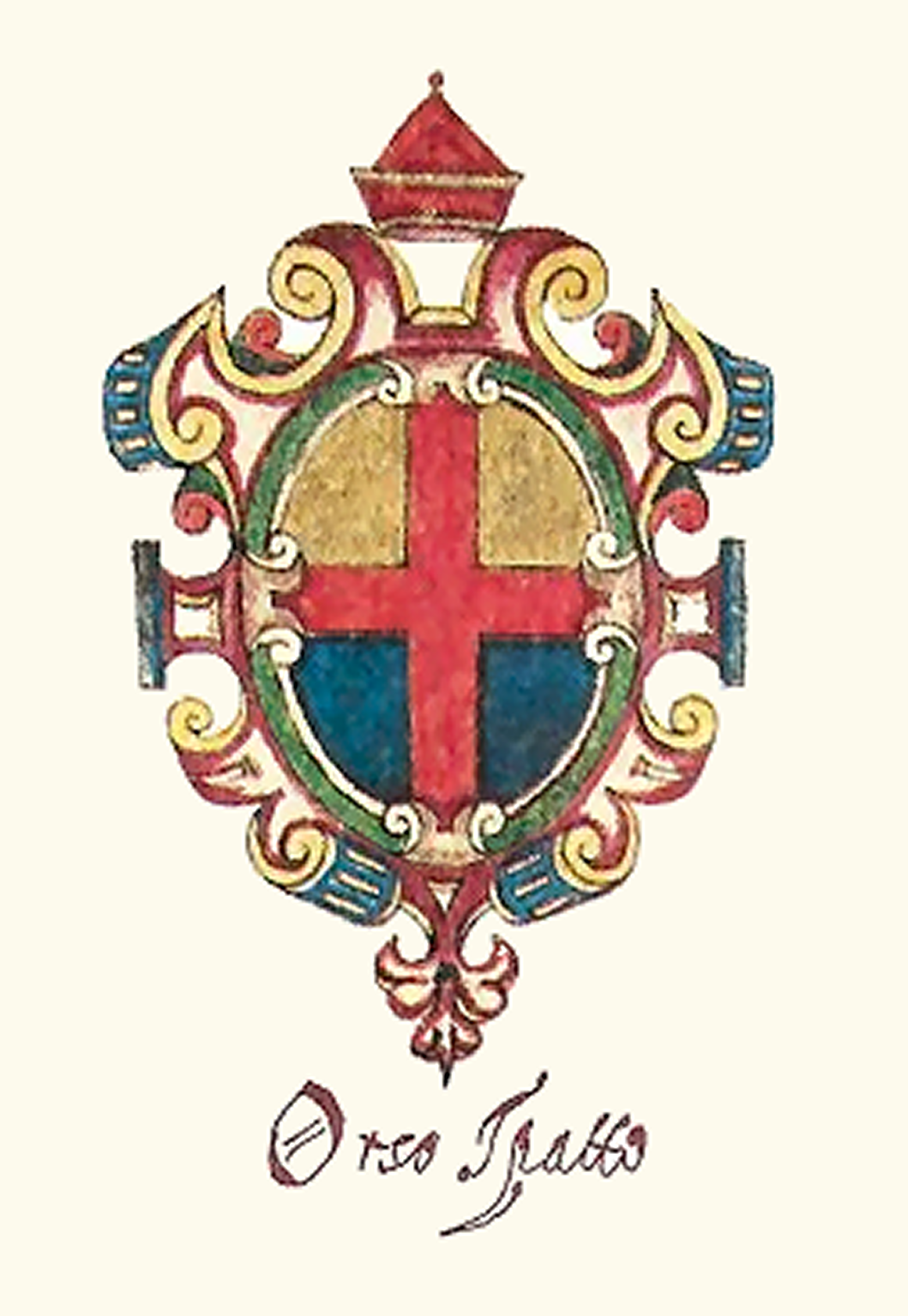
Coat of arms of Orso Ipato

Described by one historian as being a 'warlike man', his reign saw much innovation in the way of martial and naval matters. He focused especially on strengthening the navy against the Lombards and other like-minded invaders active at the time. Additionally he strove to highlight the importance of military exercises, and to this end established schools in Eraclea where the town's youth were coached in bow and crossbow shooting.

Of note was Orso's involvement in the recovery of Ravenna following its capture by the Lombard king Liutprand. It is said that, at the request of Exarch Eutychius, Orso sent a fleet of eighty ships to the fore, successfully relieving the city of Lombard control. This feat served to ease relations with the Byzantine Empire, and while Venice by no means accepted its supremacy, the two co-existed in relative concord.

For his efforts Orso was awarded the prestigious title hypatos by Emperor Leo the Isaurian. The surname Ipato is thought to be derived from this imperial honorific.

His reign came to an end in 737 in the midst of mounting conflict between Eraclea and Equilio, described by some as being a full-blown civil war. It is said that the Doge, rather than attempt to calm the situation, sided with the Eracleans and partook in the war – leading a number of his disgruntled subjects to take matters into their own hands and violently kill him.

In the years following his death there was an interregnum filled by five successive magister militiae (master of the militia), the first of these being Domenico Leoni. The office of doge was later restored with the election of Orso's son, Teodato, in 742.

== Sources ==
- Norwich, John Julius. A History of Venice. Alfred A. Knopf: New York, 1982.
- The Penny Cyclopaedia of the Society for the Diffusion of Useful Knowledge: Volume 26. Charles Knight: London, 1843.
- Wiel, Alethea. The Navy of Venice. E. P. Dutton: New York, 1910.

Political offices
Preceded by Marcello Tegalliano	Doge of Venice; 726–737	Succeeded by Dominicus Leonus as magister militum per Venetiae
