= Eraclea =

- Comune
- Comune di Eraclea
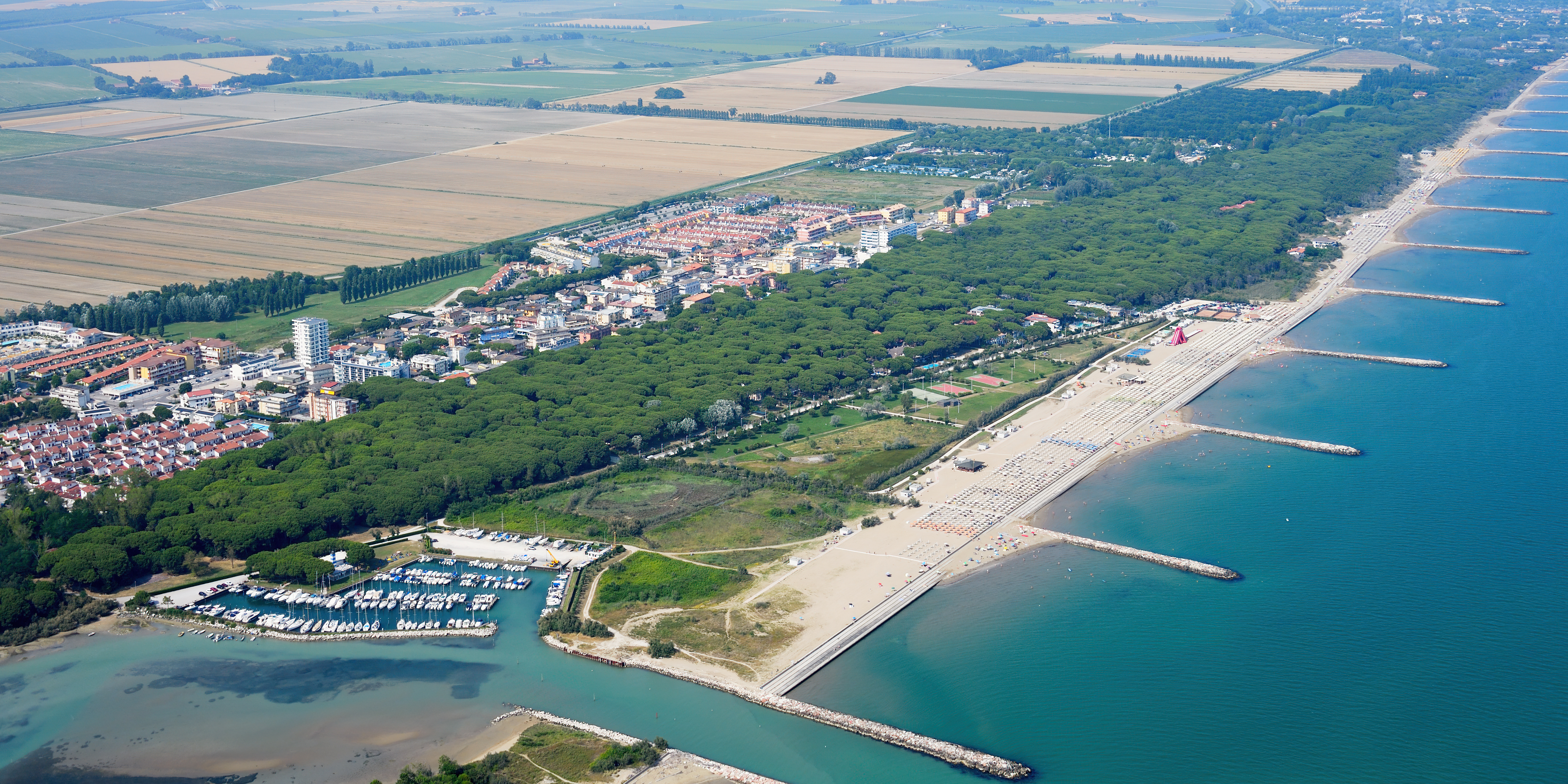

- Coat of arms

- Location within Italy Location within Veneto
- Coordinates: 45°35′N 12°41′E
- Country: Italy
- Region: Veneto
- Metropolitan city: Venice (VE)
- Frazioni: Brian, Ca' Turcata, Eracleamare, Ponte Crepaldo, Stretti, Torre di Fine, Valcasoni

Government
  - Mayor: Nadia Zanchin

Area
  - Total: 99 km^{2} (38 sq mi)
- Elevation: 2 m (6.6 ft)

Population (31 December 2017)
  - Total: 12,276
  - Density: 120/km^{2} (320/sq mi)
- Demonym: Eracleensi
- Time zone: UTC+1 (CET)
  - Summer (DST): UTC+2 (CEST)
- Postal code: 30020
- Dialing code: 0421
- Patron saint: Assumption of Mary
- Saint day: 15 August
- Website: Official website

Panorama of Eraclea's pinewood

Eraclea (Italian pronunciation: [eraˈklɛːa]) is a small city and comune in the Metropolitan City of Venice, Veneto, northern Italy. It is located on the Adriatic coast between the towns of Caorle and Jesolo.

== History ==
The Republic of Venice had its capital based in Eraclea from its founding until 742 AD, when it was replaced by Malamocco. According to Greek mythology, it was founded by the hero and demi-god Heracles.

== Tourism ==
Eraclea Mare is, together with Jesolo and Caorle, one of the main seaside resorts on the Venetian coast facing the Adriatic Sea. A steady growth of foreign tourists, especially from Germany, has been recently recorded.

== Environment ==
In 2009, Eraclea Mare was awarded the "3 Sails" by the environmental NGO Legambiente. The city was awarded the "Blue Flag" by the Foundation for Environmental Education every year from 2007 to 2017 for the cleanliness of its beaches and seawater.

== Main sights ==
Eraclea Mare is known for its pinewood and the Laguna del Mort 'Lagoon of the Dead'. The Lagoon, an unusual natural formation, was caused by the overflowing of the Piave river in 1935, whose bed was modified in its last stretch after a large flood. The Lagoon stretches between the Eraclea's Lido and the mouth of the Piave river and it is a sea-lagoon, being supplied with water only by the flood-tides. Still uncontaminated, the Mort is characterized by shallow and calm waters with a sandy and muddy seabed, rich in phytoplankton.

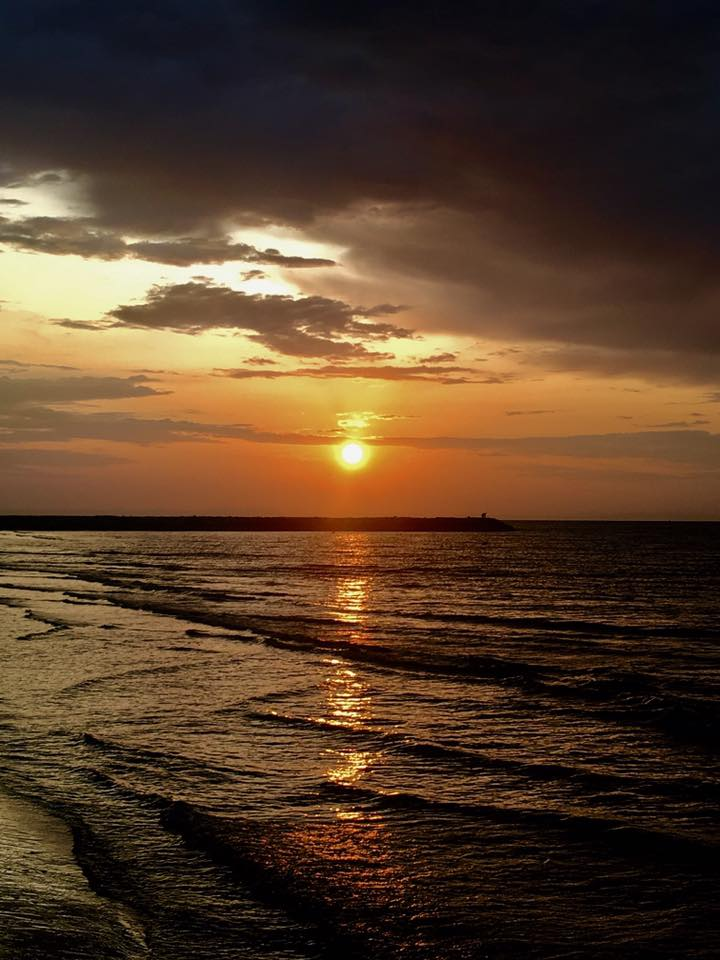
Dawn on the beach at Eracleamare.

== Economy ==
The city's economy is mostly based on agriculture and tourism, because of its 6 km-long beach (Eracleamare).

== Transportation ==
The town is served by Trenitalia services to Venice and Trieste from San Donà di Piave, and by Venice Marco Polo Airport and Treviso Airport to the west and south, respectively.

By road, Eraclea is accessible from Venice via the A4 through San Donà di Piave to the north.

== People ==
- Paolo Lucio Anafesto, first Doge of Venice (697–717)
- Marcello Tegalliano, second Doge of Venice (717–726)
- Orso Ipato, third Doge of Venice (726–737)
- Marco I Sanudo, (1153-1225), Duke of the Achipelago
- Angelo Participazio, (811–827), 10th Doge of Venice
- Saint Floriano bishop of Oderzo with sede in Eraclea (?–620?)
- Saint Tiziano bishop of Oderzo with sede in Eraclea (620?–16 January 632?)
- Saint Magno, first bishop of Eraclea (632?–638?)
- Angelo Correr, bishop of Eraclea (1406–1410) (Pope Gregorio XII)
- Giovanni Contarini, bishop of Eraclea (1427)
- Nello Santin, footballer (1946)
