= 979 =

Calendar year

979 in various calendars
Gregorian calendar	979; CMLXXIX
Ab urbe condita	1732
Armenian calendar	428; ԹՎ ՆԻԸ
Assyrian calendar	5729
Balinese saka calendar	900–901
Bengali calendar	385–386
Berber calendar	1929
Buddhist calendar	1523
Burmese calendar	341
Byzantine calendar	6487–6488
Chinese calendar	戊寅年 (Earth Tiger); 3676 or 3469 — to — 己卯年 (Earth Rabbit); 3677 or 3470
Coptic calendar	695–696
Discordian calendar	2145
Ethiopian calendar	971–972
Hebrew calendar	4739–4740
- Hindu calendars
Vikram Samvat	1035–1036
Shaka Samvat	900–901
Kali Yuga	4079–4080
Holocene calendar	10979
Iranian calendar	357–358
Islamic calendar	368–369
Japanese calendar	Tengen 2 (天元２年)
Javanese calendar	880–881
Julian calendar	979; CMLXXIX
Korean calendar	3312
Minguo calendar	933 before ROC 民前933年
Nanakshahi calendar	−489
Seleucid era	1290/1291 AG
Thai solar calendar	1521–1522
Tibetan calendar	ས་ཕོ་སྟག་ལོ་ (male Earth-Tiger); 1105 or 724 or −48 — to — ས་མོ་ཡོས་ལོ་ (female Earth-Hare); 1106 or 725 or −47

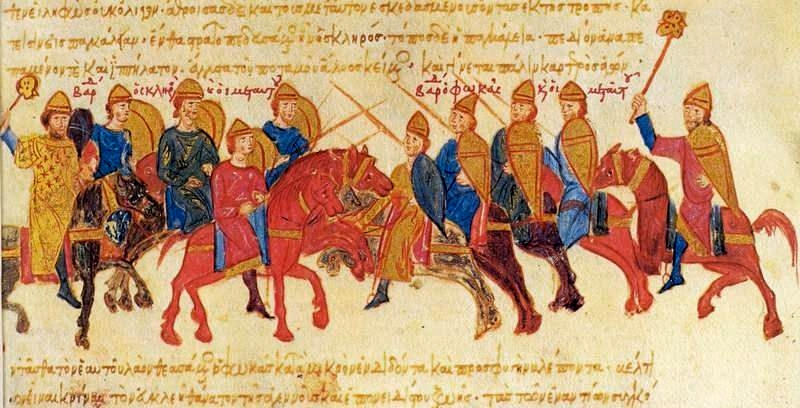
Clash between the armies of Skleros and Phokas. Miniature from the Madrid Skylitzes.

Year 979 (CMLXXIX) was a common year starting on Wednesday of the Julian calendar. It was the 979th year of the Common Era and the Anno Domini designation, the 979th year of the 1st millennium, the 79th year of the 10th century, and the 10th and last year of the 970s decade.

== Events ==
=== By place ===
==== Byzantine Empire ====
- March 24 – Second Battle of Pankaleia: An Ibero-Byzantine expeditionary force, under General Bardas Phokas (the Younger), inflicts a crushing defeat on the rebels of General Bardas Skleros, at Sarvenis (modern Turkey). Skleros manages to escape, and finds shelter with his Muslim allies. The rebellion is subdued without difficulty.

==== Europe ====
- Vitale Candiano, doge of Venice, abdicates for health reasons after a 14-month reign, and retires to a monastery. He is succeeded by Tribuno Memmo, a son-in-law of the murdered Pietro IV Candiano. Tribuno declares a general amnesty for everyone complicit in the plot against Pietro.
- June 8 – Louis V, nicknamed le Fainéant (the Do-Nothing), is crowned as the co-emperor of West Francia at Paris by his father, King Lothair. Upon Lothair's death on March 2, 986, Louis becomes the sole ruler.
- The city of Brussels is founded by Charles, duke of Lower Lorraine. He constructs fortifications (a castrum on an island) on the Senne River (modern Belgium).

==== Britain ====
- Tynwald (or Tynwald Court), the parliament of the Isle of Man, is founded. It remains active as the longest continuous parliament in the world.

==== Africa ====
- Jawhar as-Siqilli is dismissed as vizier of Egypt after an unsuccessful campaign in Syria (near Damascus). He is replaced by Ya'qub ibn Killis.

==== China ====
- Battle of Gaoliang River: Emperor Tai Zong leads an expedition into You Prefecture (or Youzhou). The Liao Dynasty counter-attacks and defeats the Song forces near modern-day Beijing.
- Summer – Tai Zong invades the Northern Han and besieges the capital of Taiyuan. A relief force sent by the Liao Dynasty is defeated. The Kingdom is absorbed into the Song Dynasty.

== Births ==
- August 29 – Otto (or Eudes), French nobleman (d. 1045)
- Al-Muqtana Baha'uddin, Druze religious leader (d. 1043)
- Estrid (or Astrid), queen consort of Sweden (d. 1035)
- Fujiwara no Takaie, Japanese nobleman (d. 1044)
- Ibn al-Samh, Andalusian astronomer (d. 1035)
- Matilda, countess palatine of Lotharingia (d. 1025)

== Deaths ==
- June 29 – Fujiwara no Koshi, Japanese empress (b. 947)
- August 3 – Thietmar, German nobleman
- August 11 – Gero, German nobleman
- August 26 – Zhao Dezhao, prince of the Song Dynasty (b. 951)
- August 29 – Abu Taghlib, Hamdanid emir
- September 19 – Gotofredo I, archbishop of Milan
- unknown dates
  - 'Imran ibn Shahin, Muslim ruler
  - Vitale Candiano, doge of Venice
  - Hasanwayh, Hasanwayhid ruler
- probable – Iago ab Idwal, king of Gwynedd
