= Pietro Candiano =

Pietro Candiano may refer to:

- Pietro I Candiano (c. 842 – 887), the sixteenth Doge of Venice
- Pietro II Candiano (c. 872 – 939), the nineteenth Doge of Venice
- Pietro III Candiano (died c. 960), Doge of Venice
- Pietro IV Candiano (died 976), Doge of Venice
