= 959 =

Calendar year

959 in various calendars
Gregorian calendar	959; CMLIX
Ab urbe condita	1712
Armenian calendar	408; ԹՎ ՆԸ
Assyrian calendar	5709
Balinese saka calendar	880–881
Bengali calendar	365–366
Berber calendar	1909
Buddhist calendar	1503
Burmese calendar	321
Byzantine calendar	6467–6468
Chinese calendar	戊午年 (Earth Horse); 3656 or 3449 — to — 己未年 (Earth Goat); 3657 or 3450
Coptic calendar	675–676
Discordian calendar	2125
Ethiopian calendar	951–952
Hebrew calendar	4719–4720
- Hindu calendars
Vikram Samvat	1015–1016
Shaka Samvat	880–881
Kali Yuga	4059–4060
Holocene calendar	10959
Iranian calendar	337–338
Islamic calendar	347–348
Japanese calendar	Tentoku 3 (天徳３年)
Javanese calendar	859–860
Julian calendar	959; CMLIX
Korean calendar	3292
Minguo calendar	953 before ROC 民前953年
Nanakshahi calendar	−509
Seleucid era	1270/1271 AG
Thai solar calendar	1501–1502
Tibetan calendar	ས་ཕོ་རྟ་ལོ་ (male Earth-Horse); 1085 or 704 or −68 — to — ས་མོ་ལུག་ལོ་ (female Earth-Sheep); 1086 or 705 or −67

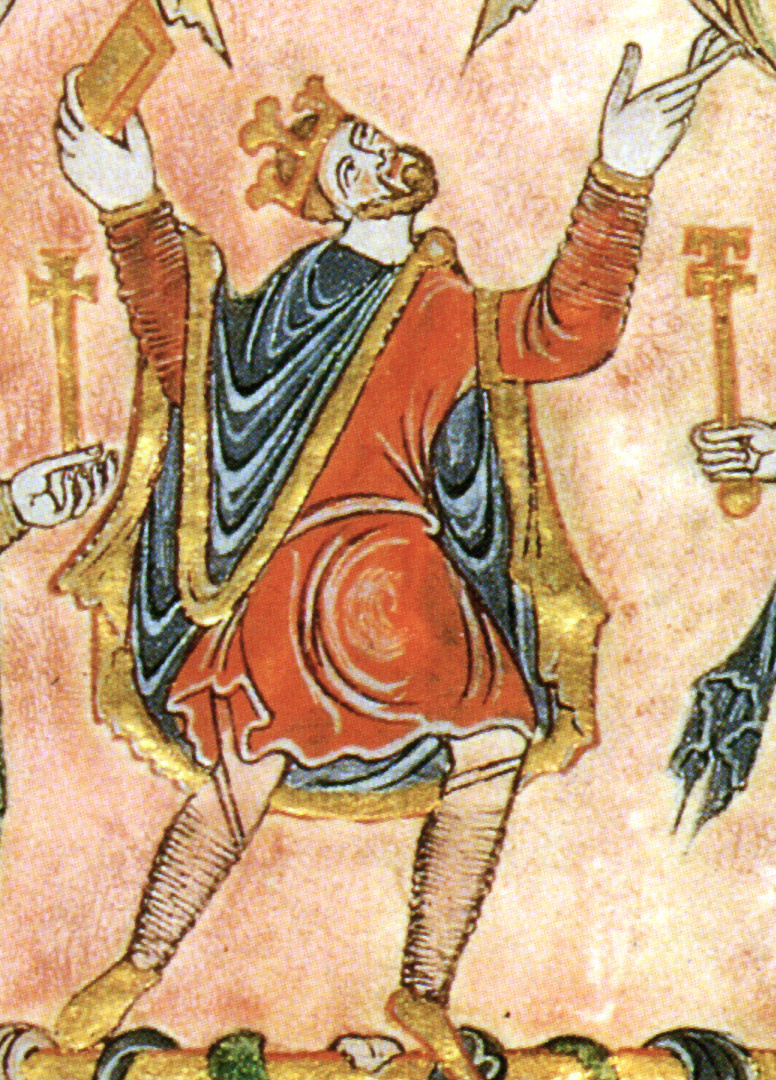
King Edgar the Peaceful (c. 943–975)

Year 959 (CMLIX) was a common year starting on Saturday of the Julian calendar.

== Events ==
=== By place ===
==== Byzantine Empire ====
- April - May – The Byzantines refuse to pay the yearly tribute. A Hungarian army, led by Apor, invades Macedonia and Thrace. He plunders its territories until reaching Constantinople. On his way back, Apor is defeated during a night attack by Byzantine forces.
- November 9 – Emperor Constantine VII Porphyrogennetos ("born in the purple") dies at Constantinople after a 46-year reign. He is succeeded by his 21-year-old son Romanos II as ruler of the Byzantine Empire.
- Winter – Romanos II appoints Leo Phokas (the Younger) to be commander of the Byzantine field army (Domestic of the Schools) in the West. The Phokas clan becomes one of the leading families in Constantinople.

==== Europe ====
- Bruno I, archbishop and duke (archduke) of Lotharingia resigns. His brother, King Otto I divides the duchy in two parts – Upper Lorraine and Lower Lorraine. He appoints Frederick I and Godfrey I as margraves (vice-duke).
- Pietro III Candiano, doge of Venice, dies after a 17-year reign. He is succeeded by his son Pietro IV Candiano, who breaks off his campaign in Spoleto on behalf of King Berengar II of Italy and returns to Venice.
- Pietro IV Candiano divorces his wife Joanna for political reasons and banishes her as a nun to the monastery of San Zaccaria.

==== England ====
- October 1 – King Eadwig dies after a 4-year reign. He is succeeded by his 16-year-old brother Edgar I (the Peaceful), who effectively completes the unification of England, when Northumbria submits to his rule.

=== By topic ===
==== Religion ====
- Dunstan, bishop of Worcester and London, is appointed by Edgar I as archbishop of Canterbury and becomes his chief adviser.

== Births ==
- April 12 – En'yū, emperor of Japan (d. 991)
- Yeshe-Ö, Tibetan lama-king (approximate date)
- Zhao Defang, prince of the Song Dynasty (d. 981)

== Deaths ==
- July 27 – Chai Rong, emperor of Later Zhou (b. 921)
- October 1 – Eadwig (the All Fair), king of England
- October 3 – Gérard of Brogne, Frankish abbot
- November 9 – Constantine VII, Byzantine emperor (b. 905)
- Ælfsige (or Aelfsige), archbishop of Canterbury
- Chen Jue, Chinese official and chief of staff
- Donnchadh mac Urchadh, king of Maigh Seóla (Ireland)
- Han Yanhui, Chinese Khitan chancellor (b. 882)
- Pietro III Candiano, doge of Venice
- Song Qiqiu, Chinese chief strategist (b. 887)
