= 932 =

Calendar year

932 in various calendars
Gregorian calendar	932; CMXXXII
Ab urbe condita	1685
Armenian calendar	381; ԹՎ ՅՁԱ
Assyrian calendar	5682
Balinese saka calendar	853–854
Bengali calendar	338–339
Berber calendar	1882
Buddhist calendar	1476
Burmese calendar	294
Byzantine calendar	6440–6441
Chinese calendar	辛卯年 (Metal Rabbit); 3629 or 3422 — to — 壬辰年 (Water Dragon); 3630 or 3423
Coptic calendar	648–649
Discordian calendar	2098
Ethiopian calendar	924–925
Hebrew calendar	4692–4693
- Hindu calendars
Vikram Samvat	988–989
Shaka Samvat	853–854
Kali Yuga	4032–4033
Holocene calendar	10932
Iranian calendar	310–311
Islamic calendar	319–320
Japanese calendar	Jōhei 2 (承平２年)
Javanese calendar	831–832
Julian calendar	932; CMXXXII
Korean calendar	3265
Minguo calendar	980 before ROC 民前980年
Nanakshahi calendar	−536
Seleucid era	1243/1244 AG
Thai solar calendar	1474–1475
Tibetan calendar	ལྕགས་མོ་ཡོས་ལོ་ (female Iron-Hare); 1058 or 677 or −95 — to — ཆུ་ཕོ་འབྲུག་ལོ་ (male Water-Dragon); 1059 or 678 or −94

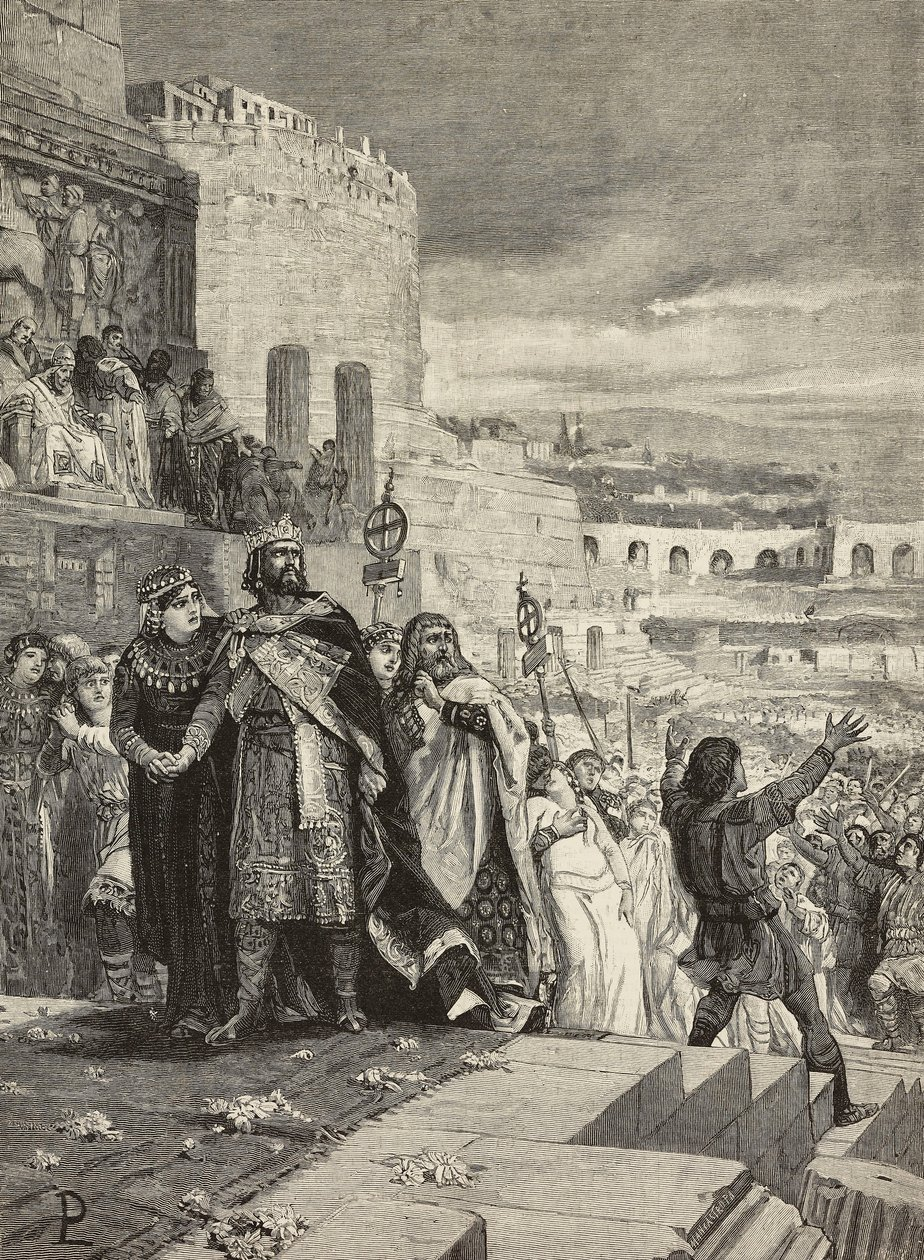
The wedding of Marozia (left) with King Hugh of Provence.

Year 932 (CMXXXII) was a leap year starting on Sunday of the Julian calendar.

== Events ==
=== By place ===
==== Europe ====
- Summer – Alberic II leads an uprising at Rome against his stepfather Hugh of Provence, king of Italy, after he is insulted at the wedding of his mother, Marozia. Alberic seizes the Lateran Palace, and Hugh escapes with an escort out of the city. Marozia is captured and put in prison. Alberic takes control of the city and appoints himself as the ruler (princeps) of Rome.
- Doge Orso II Participazio retires voluntarily to a monastery, marking the end of the Participazio dominance of the Venetian dogeship. He is succeeded by Pietro II Candiano, the son and namesake of the earlier doge Pietro I.
- Pietro II and Capodistria make a trade agreement without imperial authorization, the self-proclaimed "Marquis" Wintkar forbids repaying any debts to Venice. Pietro begins an economic blockade of Istrian cities.

==== Asia ====
- Emir Mardavij ibn Ziyar invades Tabaristan and captures the city of Gorgan. The Daylamite military leader Makan ibn Kaki tries to reclaim his territories, but fails. He seeks refuge among the Samanids and enters the service of their ruler Nasr II. He appoints him as governor of Kirman (modern Iran).

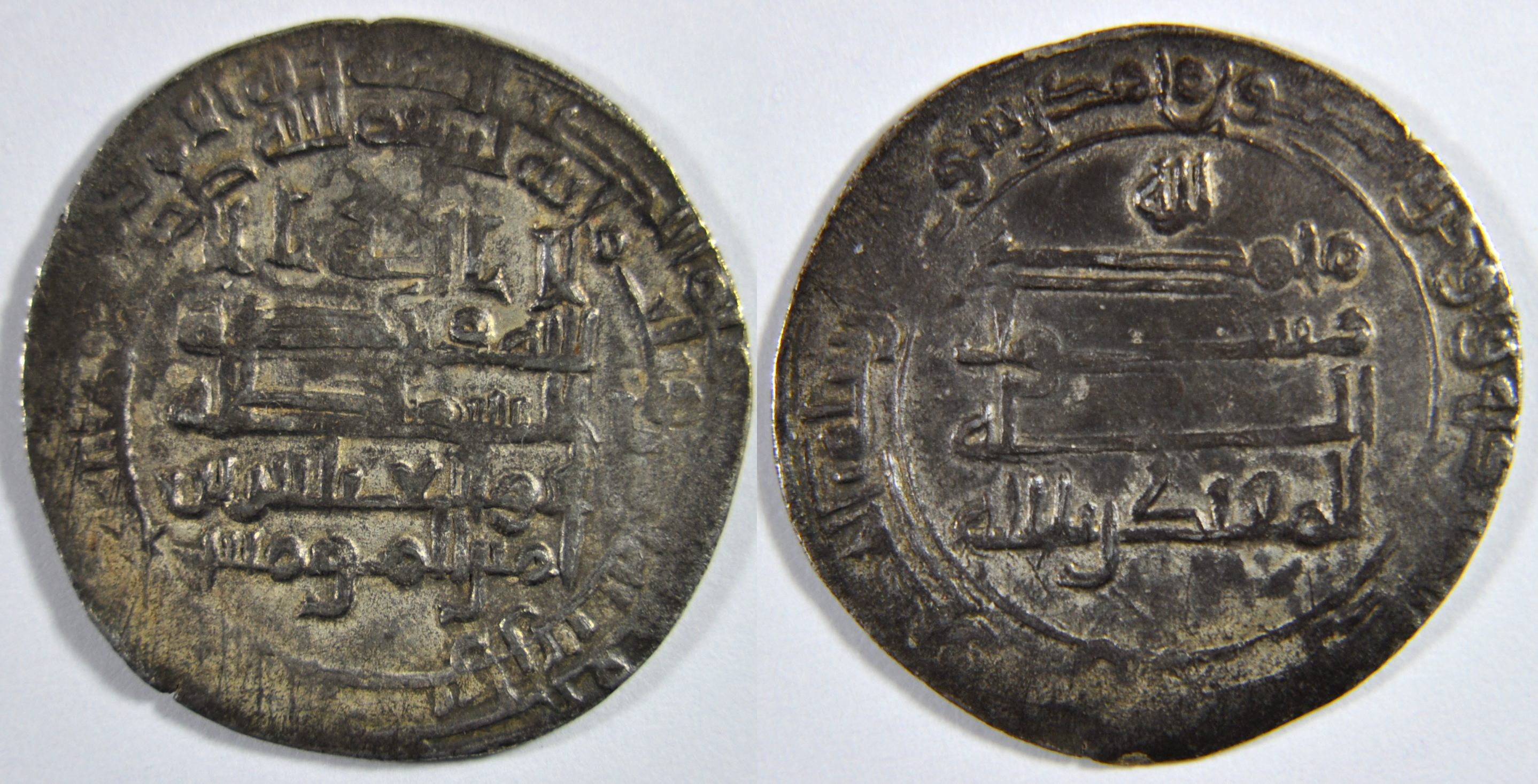
Dirham of Abbasid caliph Al-Muqtadir (r. 908–932)

- October 31 – Abbasid caliph al-Muqtadir is killed while fighting against the forces of general Mu'nis al-Muzaffar. Al-Muqtadir's brother al-Qahir is chosen to succeed him.

=== By topic ===
==== Religion ====
- Summer – Pope John XI is forced to grant power over Rome to his half-brother Alberic II, who is invested as "Prince and Senator of all Romans". John is to resign himself to spiritual leadership of the Catholic Church.

== Births ==
- August 28 – Richard I, duke of Normandy (d. 996)
- September 26 – Al-Mu'izz, Fatimid caliph (d. 975)
- Abu Firas al-Hamdani, Arab prince and poet (or 933)
- Miskawayh, Persian philosopher and historian (d. 1030)
- Sancho I (the Fat), king of León (approximate date)

== Deaths ==
- May 6 – Qian Liu, Chinese warlord and king (b. 852)
- May 18 – Ma Shaohong, general of Later Tang
- June 1 – Thietmar, duke of Saxony
- June 10 – Dong Zhang, Chinese general
- August 15 – Ma Xisheng, king of Chu (b. 899)
- October 31 – Al-Muqtadir, Abbasid caliph (b. 895)

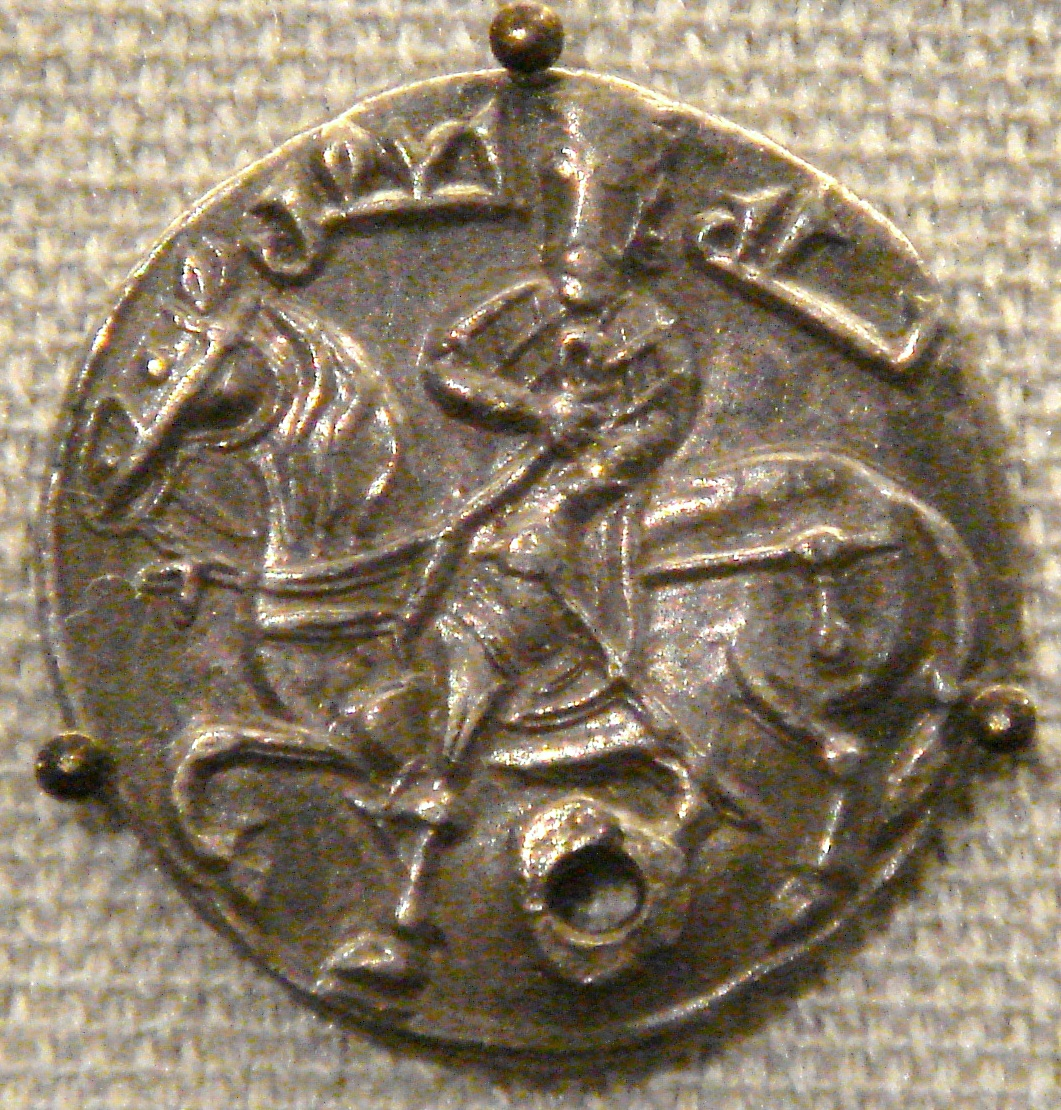
Al-Muqtadir's silver Dirham. (Abbasid caliph Al-Muqtadir was assassinated on 31 October 932)

- Fujiwara no Sadakata, Japanese poet (b. 873)
- Isaac Judaeus, Arab Jewish physician (approximate date)
- Orso II Participazio, doge of Venice
- Reginar II, Frankish nobleman (b. 890)
- Rollo, duke of Normandy (approximate date)

== In fiction ==
- The film Monty Python and the Holy Grail is partially set in this year.
