= Pietro Orseolo =

Pietro Orseolo may refer to:

- Pietro I Orseolo (928–987), Doge of Venice from 976 to 978
- Pietro II Orseolo, Doge of Venice from 991 to 1009
- Peter Orseolo, King of Hungary (11th century)
