= Waldrada of Tuscany =

Dogaressa of Venice

Valdrada (Gualdrada) of Tuscany (died 997) was a Dogaressa of Venice by marriage to the Doge Pietro IV Candiano (r. 959–976).

== Early life ==
She was the daughter of Hubert, Duke of Spoleto, grandfather of Mathilda of Tuscany. She was arranged to be married to Pietro by Emperor Otto III after the divorce of his former dogaressa, Giovanniccia Candiano. She brought a dowry including castles and a retinue of slaves.

== Dogaressa ==
She and the Doge created the custom of the Mundio, in which the doge granted half of his income to his consort. Valdrada became unpopular in Venice because of her arrogance, but she had good relations with Pietro. She supported his ambitions and strengthened his status by behaving as a Queen, and was reportedly the first dogaressa to follow a royal ceremonial protocol. She introduced bull fighting in Venice, which became popular and at which she presided.

Slavery became a controversial issue in Venice because of her retinue of slaves, but when her spouse asked her to free them, she replied that she was a subject of the emperor, but not of the doge. In 976 the Venetians rebelled. They set fire to the residence of the Doge and the family fled he with their small son Pietro in his arms, she with her daughter Marina in hers. Valdrada begged for the life of her son, but both her husband and her son were lynched. She was allowed to leave with her daughter, perhaps because Venice feared the vengeance of the emperor if she was harmed.

== Later life ==
She fled to Empress Adelaide in Verona. She demanded that her dowry be restored from Venice, and that Venice be destroyed by the emperor for the rebellion. After negotiations, a settlement was reached. She refused to become a nun as a widow, which was the Venetian custom, and settled at the court of her brother in Tuscany, where she died. Her daughter Marina became the Dogaressa of the Doge Tribuno Memmo, but he was deposed in 990, after which Marina became a nun.

Preceded by Giovanniccia Candiano	Dogaressa of Venice; 966–976	Felicia Malipiero
