= Pietro Participazio =

Doge of Venice from 939 to 942

- Portrait in the Doge's Palace

Doge of Venice
- Reign: 939 – 942
- Predecessor: Pietro II Candiano
- Successor: Pietro III Candiano
- Born: Unknown; Venice, Republic of Venice
- Died: 942; Venice, Republic of Venice
- Burial: Monastery of Saints Felix and Fortunatus
- House: Participazio
- Father: Orso II Participazio

Pietro Participazio (Latin: Petrus Particiacus, died 942), also known as Pietro Badoer (Latin: Petrus Badovarius), was a Venetian patrician who reigned as the Doge of Venice from 939 until his death. The son of former doge Orso II Participazio, he was the 20th Doge in the traditional numbering.

The oldest surviving source, the Chronicon Venetum et Gradense by John the Deacon, makes no mention of his reign, recording only that he had been captured by Tsar Simeon I of Bulgaria almost three decades earlier. This silence in the sources led early historians to assume that he had ruled peacefully. He may have continued his father's pacifist policies, but his reign was nevertheless a brief interlude in a period dominated by the powerful Candiano family, to whom both his predecessor and successor belonged.

== Family name ==
Pietro is first recorded by Venetian chronicler John the Deacon in his Chronicon Venetum et Gradense, written around 1008, approximately eighty years after his death. John identifies Pietro with the family name Badovarius (Badoer), while claiming his father as the former doge Orso II, who is instead given the last name Particiacus (Participazio). A tenuous indication of a connection between the Participazio and Badoer families is provided by a man named Badoer (Latin: Badovarium), one of the brothers of doge Giovanni II Participazio. According to historian Marco Pozza, if this Badoer was the father of Orso II, Pietro may have adopted his grandfather's baptismal name as a family name. John also mentions a naval commander named Orso Badoer (Latin: Ursus Badovarius), who may have been related to the Pietro. The Chronicon Altinate by contrast, refers to Pietro and Orso II by the family name Paureta.

Until the fall of the Republic of Venice, historical works generally referred to Pietro as Pietro Badoer or by similar forms of the surname. During the 18th and 19th centuries, however, scholars began applying the surname Participazio to all the doges then believed to have been related to Orso II, including Pietro. This practice was intended to distinguish Pietro's family from the later patrician House of Badoer, which emerged only in the 13th century and was traditionally, but without historical evidence, considered to be descended from Pietro's family on the basis of their shared surname. Some historians, including Samuele Romanin and Heinrich Kretschmayr, nevertheless continued to refer to him as Pietro Badoer.

== Biography ==
=== Early life ===
The earliest known event in Pietro's life occurred shortly after Orso II had been elected doge by the popular assembly, when he was sent to Constantinople to pay homage to either Emperor Leo VI or his successor Emperor Alexander. As had become customary, the emperor granted him the court title of protospatharios. On his return journey, Pietro was captured around 912 by Prince Michael of Zahumlje. He handed Pietro over to Tsar Simeon I of Bulgaria, with whom he was allied in a war against the Byzantine Empire. Simeon subsequently released Pietro in exchange for a ransom. The duration of Pietro's captivity is generally given only vaguely, although some accounts extend it to as much as eighteen years. Some chroniclers identify the captive as Orso II's brother rather than his son, while accounts of the reigning Byzantine emperor are equally inconsistent.

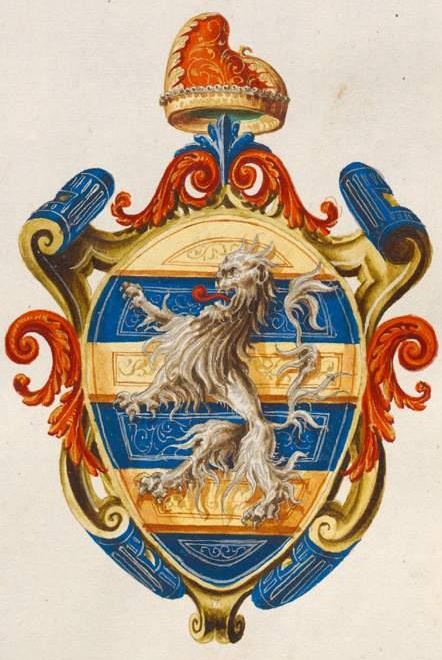
Attributed arms of the House of Participazio

According to John the Deacon, negotiations for Pietro's release were conducted under the leadership of Domenico, the future bishop of Malamocco. While John makes no connection between the doge's son's liberation and Domenico's subsequent appointment, Andrea Dandolo, writing in the 14th century, claims that Domenico was made bishop in recognition of his services.

=== Dogeship ===
Pietro himself was elected doge upon the death of his father's successor, Pietro II Candiano, in 939. As doge, Pietro is sometimes enumerated as Pietro II Participazio in order to distinguish him from Pietro, brother and briefly co-doge of Giovanni II Participazio.

According to the Cronica di Venexia detta di Enrico Dandolo, written in the 14th century, his reign was characterised by free trade, particularly with the Kingdom of Italy. According to the chronicle, freedom of trade may have been possible because of privileges that Pietro had negotiated with King Berengar. It is unclear which Berengar the chronicle refers to, since Berengar I had been king only until 924, while Berengar II did not become king until 950. In fact, the privileges were actually renewed in 951, during the reign of his successor, Pietro III Candiano. Venetian merchants paid only a small fee, giving them a considerable advantage over other traders.

Pietro died in 942, three years after his election, leaving virtually no historical record. He may have resumed his father's pacifist foreign policy. His dogeship was only a brief interlude in a period dominated by the Candiano family, as Pietro was succeeded by his predecesor's son Pietro III Candiano. Pietro was buried in the Monastery of Saints Felix and Fortunatus in Ammiana, where his father was buried before him.

== Legacy ==
Pietro is depicted in the posthumous series of official portraits of the doges of Venice in the Doge's Palace. The original gallery was established in the 1360s under doge Marco Cornaro as a chronological sequence of Venetian rulers, each shown holding a scroll inscribed with a summary of his achievements. After the original paintings were destroyed in the fire of 1577, the series was recreated, with Domenico Tintoretto executing most of the surviving portraits. The scroll held by Pietro contains the following inscription in Latin:

MULTA BERENGARIUS MIHI PRIVILEGIA FECIT. IS QUOQUE MONETAM CUDERE POSSE DEDIT

[Berengar granted me numerous privileges; he also granted me the right to mint coins.]

The privileges were actually renewed in 951, during the reign of his successor, Pietro III Candiano.

== See also ==
- List of doges of Venice
- Orso II Participazio

== Sources ==
- Mastandrea, Pedrocco (2017). i DOGI nei ritratti parlanti di Palazzo Ducale a Venezia. Cierre edizioni. ISBN 978-88-8314-902-3.
- Da Mosto, Andrea (1939). I Dogi di Venezia con particolare riguardo alle loro tombe. Ferdinando Ongania.
- Pozza, Marco (1984a). "Particiaco, Orso II". Dizionario Biografico degli Italiani (in Italian). Vol. 81: Pansini–Pazienza. Rome: Institute of the Italian Encyclopaedia. ISBN 978-88-12-00032-6.
- Pozza, Marco (1984b). "Particiaco, Agnello". Dizionario Biografico degli Italiani (in Italian). Vol. 81: Pansini–Pazienza. Rome: Institute of the Italian Encyclopaedia. ISBN 978-88-12-00032-6.
- Pozza, Marco (1982). I Badoer. Una famiglia veneziana dal X al XIII secolo. Padua: Francisci.
- Cessi, Roberto, ed. (1933). Origo civitatum Italiae seu Venetiarum (Chronicon Altinate et Chronicon Gradense). Rome.
- Monticolo, Giovanni, ed. (1890). La cronaca veneziana del diacono Giovanni (PDF). Fonti per la storia d’Italia (Medio Evo). Vol. IX. Rome.
- Okey, Thomas (1905). The Story of Venice. J.M. Dent & Company.
- Hazlitt, William Carew (1858). The History of the Origin and Rise of the Republic of Venice. J.R. Smith. p. 135.
- Katsikas, Stefanos (2011). Bulgaria and Europe: Shifting Identities. Anthem Press. ISBN 978-0-85728-419-8.
- Uzelac, Aleksandar (2018). Prince Michael of Zahumlje – a Serbian ally of tsar Symeon. София: St Kliment Ohridski University Press.
- Marin, Șerban (2023). "The Adventures of a Doge's Son in the Balkans in the 10th Century. The Case of Pietro Badoaro (revisited)". Plovdivski Istoricheski Forum. 7.
- Pesce, Roberto, ed. (2010). Cronica di Venexia detta di Enrico Dandolo. Origini–1362. Venice: Centro di Studi Medievali e Rinascimentali "Emmanuele Antonio Cicogna".
- Pastorello, Ester (1938). Chronica per extensum descripta aa. 46–1280 dC. Rerum Italicarum Scriptores. Vol. XII, 1. Bologna: Nicola Zanichelli.
- Zanotto, Francesco (1861). Il Palazzo ducale di Venezia. Vol. 4. Venice.
- Romanin, Samuele (1853). Storia documentata di Venezia. Vol. 1. Venice: Pietro Naratovich.
- Kretschmayr, Heinrich (1905). Geschichte von Venedig. Vol. 1. Gotha.

Political offices
Preceded by Pietro II Candiano	Doge of Venice; 939–942	Succeeded by Pietro III Candiano
