= Battle of Riade =

933 battle between East Francia and invading Magyar (Hungarian) forces

- Part of the Hungarian invasions of Europe
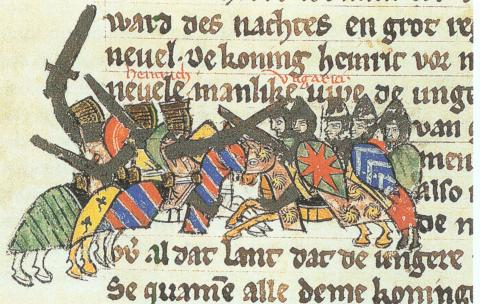
- Henry I fights against the Magyars, Sächsische Weltchronik, c. 1270
Date	15 March 933
Location	Central Germany, exact location unknown
Result	German victory

Belligerents
East Francia (Kingdom of Germany)	Principality of Hungary

Commanders and leaders
Henry the Fowler	Unknown

Casualties and losses
Reportedly minor	Reportedly minor

The Battle of Riade, also called Battle of Merseburg or Battle at the Unstrut, was fought between the troops of East Francia under King Henry I and the Magyars at an unidentified location in northern Thuringia along the river Unstrut on 15 March 933. The battle was precipitated by the decision of the Synod of Erfurt to stop paying an annual tribute to the Magyars in 932.

== Prelude ==
The Magyars (Hungarians), who had originally served as mercenaries under Emperor Arnulf, after his death in 899 began to campaign in the Kingdom of Italy and East Francia. In 906 they broke up Great Moravia and one year later destroyed a Bavarian army under Margrave Luitpold at the Battle of Pressburg.

In 924 a Magyar army invading the German duchy of Saxony defeated King Henry I in the field, but an Árpád prince—probably Zoltán—captured near Pfalz Werla allowed Henry to negotiate for terms. A truce of nine years, during which annual tribute was required of the Germans, was declared in 926. During the truce, Henry reorganised the defences of his Saxonian duchy and subdued the Polabian Slavs in the east. At a 926 assembly, Henry secured the construction of new castles and the authorisation of a new form of garrison duty: the soldiery were organised into groups of nine agrarii milites (farmer-soldiers), one of which was doing guard duty at any given time while the other eight worked the fields. In time of invasion, all nine could man the castles.

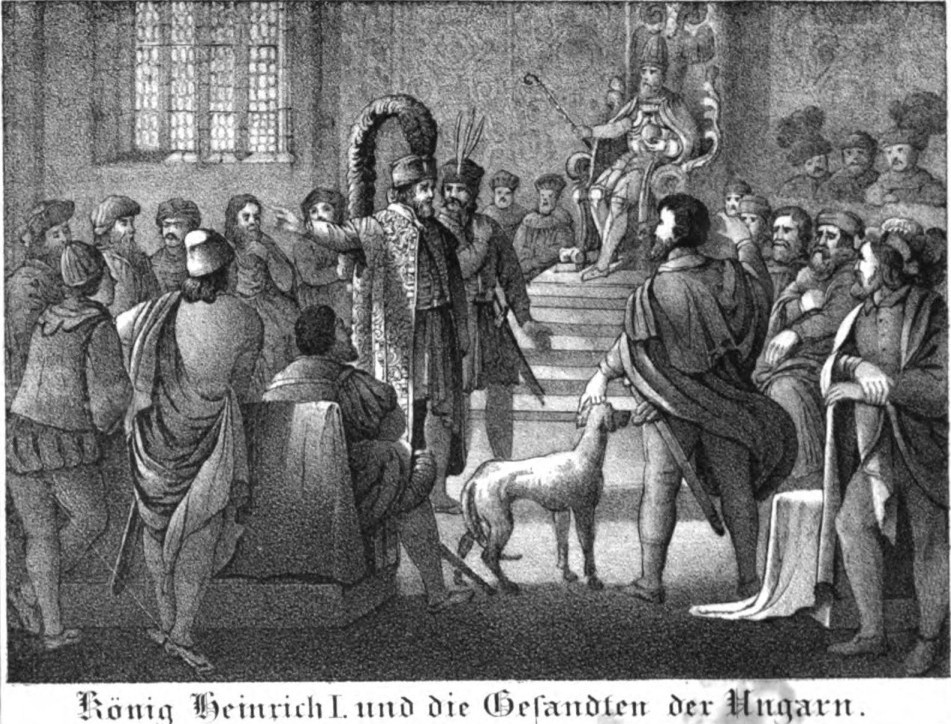
King Henry and the Hungarian envoys, 19th century depiction

After he believed the necessary reforms had been made, Henry secured the support of the church in reneging on tribute payments in 932. Allegedly he had a dead dog thrown down in front of the Magyar negotiators, which amounted to a declaration of war.

== Battle ==
In preparation for the campaign, Henry levied mounted contingents from every region and stem duchy of the German kingdom, though only French chronicler Flodoard of Reims records the Bavarian presence. The Thuringian contingent, though probably mounted, was described as inermes, or unarmed (though probably just poorly armed) by the contemporary chronicler Widukind of Corvey. His Saxon horsemen were described as armed warriors (miles armatus), but "he could not trust his horsemen, because they lacked certain skills and not enough of them were equipped as a miles armatus should be."

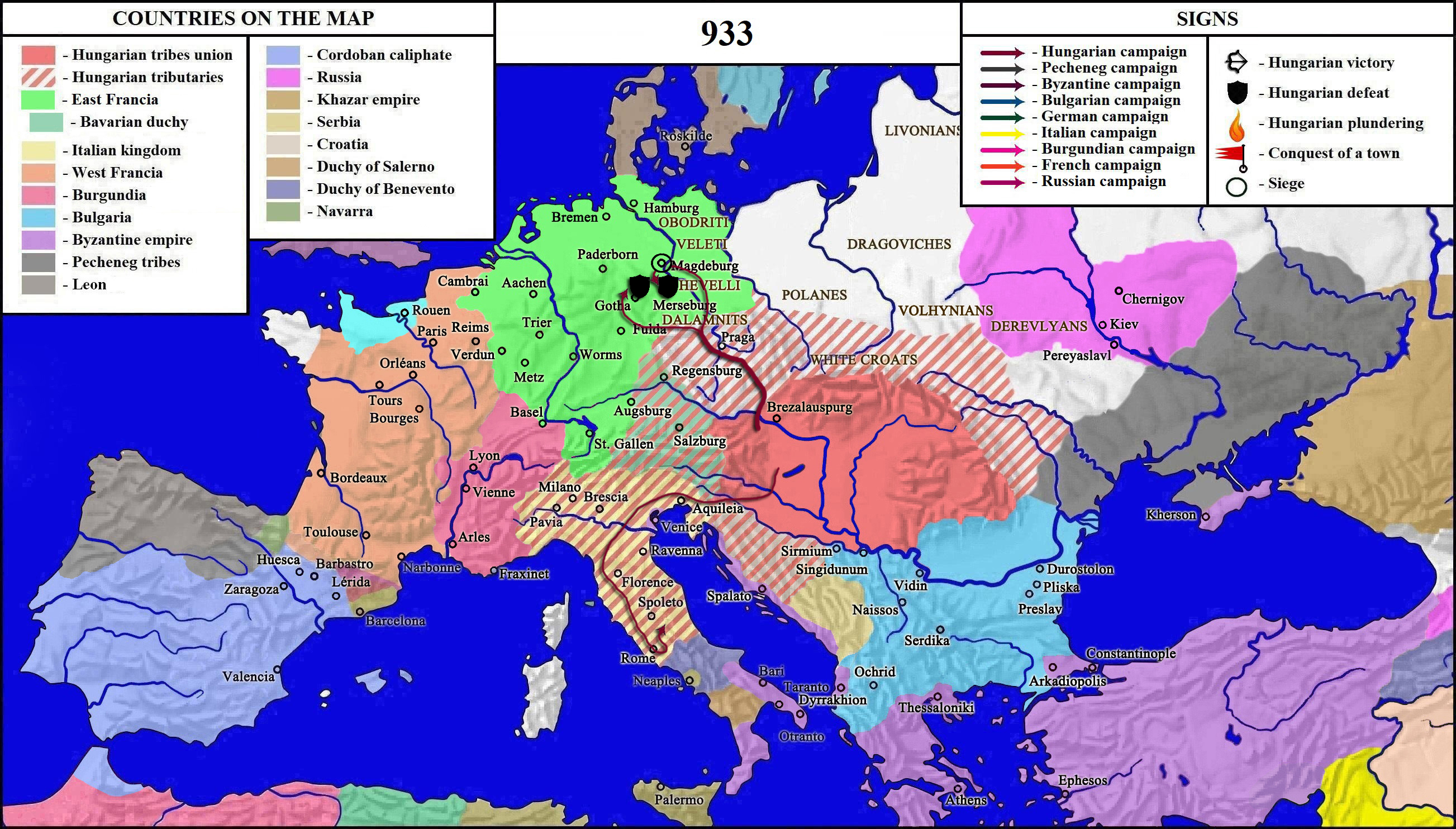
The Hungarian campaigns of 933 against the German Kingdom and the Battle of Merseburg.

The Magyars had besieged an unknown town but attempted to withdraw in the night because Henry and his army had camped in the neighborhood at Riade. Henry sent forward a small contingent of footsoldiers with a few cavalrymen as a screen for his main army. The king had learned what to expect from the preceding struggles, where the rapidity of the Magyar light cavalry and archers had brought them success. He confronted their onset with light armoured combatants at first, followed by a massed heavy cavalry attack. According to Widukind of Corvey, the Magyar forces readily fled at the coming of Henry's horsemen and the victorious German troops declared Henry emperor on the battlefield.

The exact location of the battle is unknown and several municipalities in Central Germany claim to be the site of the combat, among them Kalbsrieth, at the confluence of Unstrut and Helme, and the Hunnenfeld near Riethgen. However the place of Riade rendered by Widukind denotes the army camp of King Henry, probably not identical with the battlefield.

== Aftermath ==
In Henry's lifetime the Magyars did not dare to make a further raid on East Francia. In 954 they again invaded Germany during a rebellion instigated by Duke Liudolf of Swabia and were finally defeated by Henry's son and successor King Otto I at the Battle of Lechfeld.

== Sources ==
- Bernhardt, John W. (1993). Itinerant Kingship and Royal Monasteries in Early Medieval Germany, c. 936–1075. Cambridge: Cambridge University Press.
- Leyser, Karl (1968). "Henry I and the Beginnings of the Saxon Empire". The English Historical Review. 83 (326): 5–6. doi:10.1093/ehr/lxxxiii.cccxxvi.1. JSTOR 561761.
- Reuter, Timothy (1991). Germany in the Early Middle Ages 800–1056. New York: Longman.
- Santosuosso, Antonio (2004). Barbarians, Marauders, and Infidels: The Ways of Medieval Warfare. New York: MJF Books.
