= Synod of Erfurt =

The Synod (or Council) of Erfurt was a church council held at Erfurt in northeastern Thuringia under the presidency of Henry I of Germany in 932.

Erfurt was attended by ecclesiastics from every region of the Kingdom of Germany save the Duchy of Bavaria, where Duke Arnulf presided over the Synod of Dingolfing, probably in concert with Henry's simultaneous Erfurt event. The purpose of the synod was to deal with everyday church matters, but it did discuss one pressing issue, that of the annual tribute owed to the Magyars during a nine-year truce (beginning 926). The synod agreed to cease paying the tribute and the Battle of Riade precipitated.

Among the other issues the synod considered was that brought forward by Pietro Candiano II, Doge of Venice, who suggested in a letter to the council that all Jews who refused to be baptised be expelled from the kingdom.

The canons of the council were published as a breviarium canonum and sent to Adalbert, Archbishop of Salzburg.

== Sources ==
- Kedar, B. Z. "Expulsion as an Issue of World History." Journal of World History. Vol. VII, No 2, Fall 1996, pp 165–180.
- Reuter, Timothy. Germany in the Early Middle Ages 800–1056. New York: Longman, 1991.
- Bernhardt, John W. Itinerant Kingship and Royal Monasteries in Early Medieval Germany, c. 936–1075. Cambridge: Cambridge University Press, 1993.
