= Pietro II Candiano =

Doge of Venice between 932 and 939

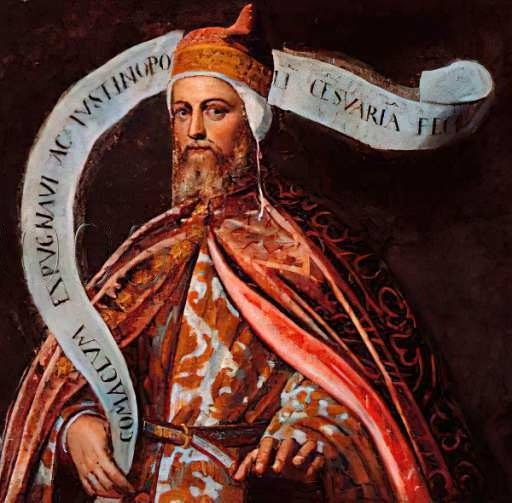
- Portrait in the Doge’s Palace

19th Doge of Venice
- In office 932–939
- Preceded by: Orso II Participazio
- Succeeded by: Pietro Participazio

Personal details
- Born: c. 872
- Died: 939

Pietro II Candiano (c. 872 – 939) was the nineteenth Doge of Venice between 932 and 939. He followed Orso II Participazio (912–932) to become Doge in 932.

== Career ==
The Candiano family was the most important family of Venice during the tenth century. Pietro II's father Pietro I was the first Candiano to become doge in 887, but died soon after while fighting the Narentines.

At the beginning of his term in 932, Pietro II cosigned a letter with Marinus Contarini, the Patriarch of Grado, which he sent to the Synod of Erfurt asking for the expulsion from Germany of the Jews who refused to convert to Christianity. The King of Germany Henri I—who presided over the Synod—did not follow his recommendation though.

With the weakening power of the Byzantine Empire in the Adriatic Sea, Venice asserted an independent policy of taking control the northern part of the sea. Pietro II began this expansion in the area, notably against the rival city of Comacchio, which he burnt to the ground after it had attacked Venetian ships. He also expanded the territory of Venice to Istria, by capturing Capodistria (now Koper in Slovenia). He then received the submission of other Istrian cities thanks to an economic blockade of the area.

He died in 939 and was succeeded by Pietro Participazio (son of Orso II). Pietro II's son Pietro III (942–959) and his two grandsons Pietro IV (959–976) and Vitale (978–979) also became doges. They all continued Pietro II's expansionist policy in the Gulf of Venice.

== Bibliography ==
- Bernhard Blumenkranz, Juifs et chrétiens dans le monde occidental, 430-1096, Peeters, Paris–Louvain, 2006 (first edition 1960).
- Frederic Chapin Lane, Venice, A Maritime Republic, Baltimore and London, Johns Hopkins University Press, 1973.
- Benjamin Z. Kedar, "Expulsion as an Issue of World History", Journal of World History, Vol. 7, No. 2 (Fall, 1996), pp. 165–180.

Political offices
Preceded by Orso II Participazio	Doge of Venice; 932–939	Succeeded by Pietro Participazio
