= Fulgenzio Manfredi =

Venetian friar and preacher (1560–1610)

The Rev. Fra Fulgenzio Manfredi OFM
- Born: Ludovico c. 1560; Venice, Italy
- Died: 1610; Campo de' Fiori, Rome, Italy
- Other names: Fra Fulgentio, Il Manfredi
- Occupations: Order of Friars Minor, writer, preacher
- Known for: Execution for heresy

Fulgenzio Manfredi, OFM (Venice, c. 1560 – Rome, 5 July 1610), commonly known as Fra Fulgenzio, was a Franciscan friar, an observant minor, and active preacher in Venice from 1594. During the Venetian Interdict imposed by Pope Paul V, he gained particular prominence for his anti-Roman sermons, preaching against papal regulation of religious orders in the Venetian republic.

He was a colleague of the famous theologian and scholar Paolo Sarpi in the defence of the Venetian Republic in its struggle against the Curia. Manfredi was tried by the Roman Inquisition, declared a relapsed heretic, and sentenced to be burnt. He was executed in the Campo di Fiore, in Rome.

== Early life ==
Fulgentio Manfredi was probably born in Venice circa 1563, the son of Ludovico Manfredi. We know of two brothers; Giambattista, painter and engraver, and Gabriele, sensale di cambi.

He joined religious life as an acolyte in 1580 and became a priest in 1586. He studied theology, and joined the Capuchin Franciscans, the Order of Friars Minor Capuchin. From as early as 1594 he was preaching in churches in Venice and outside, as well as in San Francesco della Vigna, where he was assigned. Known for his eloquent but biting polemic, he was banned from preaching for four years in 1594.

== Writings ==
Manfredi alternated oratory activity with the production of religious and historical writings. However his authorship of certain works is quite speculative. In 1598 a compendium on the lives of the doges appeared, that consisted of twelve tablets engraved in copper with the portraits of ninety doges, with brief biographical notes. The carving was by his brother, Giambattista, and Antonio Foscarini ascribes the biographical notes to Manfredi.

- The Procuratorial Dignity of St. Mark of Venetia (Venice, 1602).; a small work on a "matter not previously treated," according to Manfredi, which had a certain resonance among writers of his time.
- The Lives of Saints and Blessed Venetians (never published)
- Essay on the very modest lives of St Magno, contained in a sermon given in the Church of the Saints Apostles, where he preached from 1604 until 6 October 1605
- Life of St Peter of Orseolo, Doge and Prince of Venice, who became a Hermit Monk in Gascony (Venice, 1606)

Manfredi's fame however rests less in his literary productions, and more in his public oratory.

== Oratory ==
During the Venetian Interdict, his participation in the anti-Roman campaign from the ranks of the so-called "minor theologians" alongside the official ones, brought him to prominence. The fact that he was not "a public or salaried minister" was popular. From the pulpits of Il Redentore and the Church of Humility, which had been confiscated from the Jesuits and entrusted to Manfredi, in front of a large audience among whom were many senators, Manfredi excoriated "the customs of the Roman court" By 1605, the Roman Congregation of the Index, had condemned a document protesting reforms imposed on his Order, attributed to him. At the end of 1606, he was summoned by the Congregation of the Holy Office "ad respondendum de fide" (to answer for the faith), but did not attend. In a "Manifesto" written to the Roman Inquisition which had summoned him to appear (Venice 1606) he addresses "All the Most Reverend Fathers in Christ, the gratitude of the Holy Spirit, the Spirit of Christ, and the zeal of the Apostles," and professes himself, "an openly veritable preacher, a staunch defender of the Evangelical doctrine and most humble follower of the Apostolic life" The excommunication issued on 5 January 1607 brought him growing notoriety, popularity, and accusations of heresy. The republican Paolo Sarpi, wrote to the German exponent of Protestant Union, Christoph von Dohna, maintaining that Manfredi's sermons were "only against the Pope" and they "criticised the ecclesiastical defects very effectively". Even the conservative statesman, Girolamo Cappello, denied that Manfredi had affirmed "heretical things"

The general tendency was to dismiss him as a mere friar who made distasteful pronouncements against Catholic customs. Berlinghiero Gessi, the papal nuncio to Venice (Sept 1607 – July 1610) wrote to Cardinal Scipione Borghese shortly on his arrival, admitting that, although Manfredi had said many things from the pulpit, that should a case be taken against him "they could prove little" for lack of witnesses: and that "sadly he cannot be condemned, and he himself will only confess to having dissuaded the observance of the Interdict, and all the rest it is claimed he opposes, he denies". Nevertheless, Manfredi's exuberance concerned all the parties to the dispute. The Republic of Venice was careful to distinguish 'firm defense of the jurisdictional princes', from 'attacks on the pontiff's own person'. On 21 April 1607 following Cardinal François de Joyeuse's intervention in the Interdict dispute, Manfredi was withdrawn from governance of the Church of Humility and his activities limited. Nuncio Gessi, angrily protested the provocative megalomaniac posting of a festoon on the door of the Church of the Humility showing the symbol of the Holy See in a "vacant" configuration, and a separate act of displaying a portrait, with the caption "Evangelicae veritatis propugnator acerrimus" (Ardent Defender of Gospel Truth).

== Departure to Rome ==
Meanwhile, Manfredi, who was feeling increasingly isolated and betrayed by the republic he had passionately defended, became gradually more receptive to a plan to return him to obedience to the Church, devised by nuncio Gessi. Gessi rejected the Curia's proposed use of force and instead managed to exploit Manfredi's ambitiousness and vanity to cajole him. Aided by Zevio the Veronese, a friend of Manfredi and brother friar, and a promise of safe conduct and absolution from excommunication, Gessi persuaded Manfredi to 'take refuge' in Rome. Some attempted to dissuade and warn him about the patrician sarpiano Nicolò Contarini, whom the government had tasked with preventing Manfredi from carrying out anti-Venetian activity once in Rome. On 8 August 1608, with a guarantee of safe conduct, Manfredi fled to Rimini, and from there to Ferrara and Bologna, where, "jubilant and happy", he was received with full honors – wrote Zevio the Borghese. In a letter to the Venetian Senate, Manfredi claimed that presenting himself to Pope Paul V lifted the burden from them of his defense, and he assured the senators that he had acted out of "love not mercy". Nevertheless, one fellow friar confided that he had been "more coddled and favored in the past few days than in all the years of valuable service to our 'Vinetians'." One prelate, witness to his departure, commented wryly: "Poor friar, with what joy and safety he goes to Rome, not knowing that he goes to the slaughterhouse." The chronicler G.C. Sivos noted contemptuously: "Everyone ran to see him and the fool believed they competed for his virtues and beautiful deeds, not knowing himself for a wicked man...[not looking for] absolution from the excommunication, but boasting...that he was honored and cheered everywhere he passed, and feted by all the people with great competition, without seeing that many had come to witness an evildoer led to the scaffold."

Paolo Foscarini suggested that Manfredi had gone "with many doubts" and the Venetian ambassador in Rome, Francesco Contarini, wrote on 23 August that he had been promised 200 scudi a year, a secret abjuration and ample opportunity to preach.

Manfredi arrived in Rome on 30 August and went to San Pietro in Montorio, the residence of his Order and two days later had an audience with the Pope, who "welcomed him with great promptness and with great humanness" and confirmed the promises that had been given. Manfredi, initially keen to provide detailed information on Protestant penetration in Venice, was soon uneasy. He found himself relieved from office, prevented from preaching, disappointed with his commission, opposed by the confreres and viewed with increasing suspicion by the authorities, and petitioned Venice in early 1610 for his return. This was ignored. Meanwhile, throughout 1609, the Roman Inquisition continued preparations to bring serious charges against him.

== Arrest and trial ==
"Yesterday morning" – wrote the new Venetian ambassador, Giovanni Mocenigo, on 6 February 1610 – "around twenty orders went to his Church of Aracoeli, and there took Fra Fulgentio prisoner. They wanted him to talk about the person of the Pope and others, for which they are not too well received." Mocenigo wrote, on 13 February, he had been unable to ascertain anything more except that Manfredi had "caused a scandal with his customs," and that writings had been confiscated indicating his intention to escape to England. Manfredi, who was in the Tor di Nona prison, was dejected and humble, "against his custom". He was transferred to the prisons of the Inquisition Congregation, and tried. The charges included possession of forbidden books, contacts with heretics and autographed attacks on Catholic doctrine, the de-legitimisation of the Pope and the Council of Trent, and accusations of heresy. Manfredi denied all charges and claimed they were the result of misunderstanding. He was found guilty, declared a "relapso" (relapsed heretic), and handed over to the secular arm.

== Public execution ==
Different accounts of the execution are recorded; the official version given in ambassador Mocenigo's dispatches to the Senate of 3 & 10 July 1610, relates that:

On Sunday afternoon, in the Church of St. Peter, Fra Fulgentio abjured. There was present an infinite number of people. The Superiors of all the Orders were summoned to attend. I have learned from those who heard the minutes of the trial read out, that in documents in his own handwriting found in his cell he endeavoured to diminish and abolish Pontifical authority.

Fra Fulgentio was not aware that he was to make this abjuration till two hours before they took him into St. Peter's; he believed that he was to be absolved upon some salutary penance or something of little more importance; accordingly when, in the reading of the trial he heard himself styled "relapsed" and when the sentence of the Holy Office was published by which he was to be degraded and handed to the secular arm, he changed entirely and swooned away from the excessive fear which fell upon him. He was taken from St. Peter's to his degradation; and although it is customary to grant to those about to die for such crimes one or two days' grace, and the execution of the sentence was actually announced for Tuesday, nevertheless on Monday morning, very early, in the Campo di Fiore, he was hung by the neck from a stake, at which he was afterwards burned. At his death he showed great compunction of penitence, declaring aloud that he desired to die in the bosom of the Holy Roman Apostolic Church, repeating the word "Roman" several times, to the mighty edification of the bystanders. The tragedy that has befallen this unhappy man has given occasion to much discussion as to past events, and also because from this quarter he was enticed to leave Venice and was even assured of the protection and favour of His Holiness; and all the more so that, without that first abjuration which he was forced to make secretly on his arrival and merely as a form which would not deprive him of any rights, it would have been impossible to declare him "relapsed" and consequently they could not have put him to death. All the same those who heard the trial declare that he justly forfeited the protection of His Holiness and that it was impossible for them not to execute sentence on his person, for he affirmed positively that St. Peter was not the head of the Apostles, that the Pope was not St. Peter's successor, that he had no authority to create Bishops, that the Council of Trent was not general, that the Pope was a heretic, that friars and priests might marry, that it was not obligatory to consecrate the Sacrament in the Roman fashion; moreover he was in understanding with a heretic Prince in Germany and was minded to retire there in order to write and to live freely; that he had written letters to the King of England and had received in his cell a heretic English pilgrim, to whom he had said that he would like to go to England and by whom he was assured that the King would make much of him; and other such things. Rome, 10 July 1610.

An unofficial account by an anonymous sympathizer presents a non-submissive Manfredi, victim of the cruel injustice of the Apostolic See.

== Sources ==
- Roberto Zago Dizionario Biografico degli Italiani Vol. 68 (2007)
- Rev. Richard Gibbins Were "Heretics" ever burned alive at Rome? A report of the proceedings in the Roman Inquisition against F. M. (London, 1852)
