= Arcielda Candiano =

Dogaressa of Venice

Dogaressa of Venice
- Reign: 942 - 959
- Predecessor: Angela Sanudo
- Successor: Giovanniccia Candiano
- Born: Venice, Republic of Venice
- Died: Republic of Venice
- Spouse: Pietro III Candiano
- Issue: Pietro IV Candiano; Domenigo Candiano; Vitale Candiano; Stefano Candiano

Arcielda Candiano (fl. c. 927 - 959) was a Dogaressa of Venice by marriage to the Doge Pietro III Candiano (r. 942 - 959). Her name is sometimes given as Richelda.

== Life ==
She was possibly the child of a Venetian and one of the Narentine Slav women who were brought to Venice as slave captives after the campaign against the Narentian pirates in the Adriatic in 887, before she married Pietro III Candiano.

With the death of her husband in 959, Arcielda retired to become a nun as was by that time the custom for widowed dogaresses, though she inherited, through the terms of Pietro's will, a vineyard and other property in the marchese of Veneto, which she gave to the nuns of San Zaccaria.

Her four sons were Pietro IV Candiano (930 - 976), Domenigo Candiano, Bishop of Torcello, Vitale Candiano, Doge of Venice (-979) and Stefano Candiano.

Unknown	Dogaressa of Venice; 942–959	Giovanniccia Candiano
