= Orso II Participazio =

Doge of Venice from 912 to 932

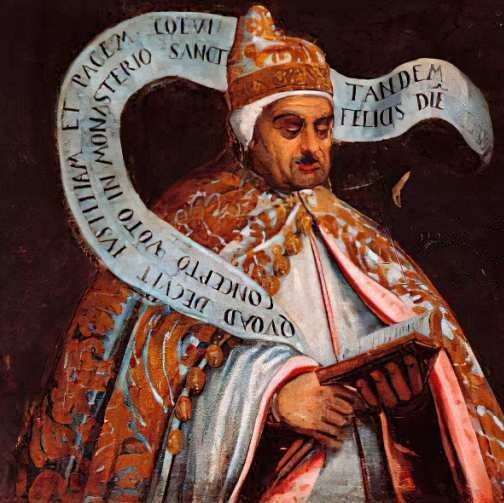
- Portrait in the Doge’s Palace

Doge of Venice
- Reign: c. 911 - 931
- Predecessor: Pietro Tribuno
- Successor: Pietro II Candiano
- Born: Unknown; Venice
- Died: After 931; Venice
- Burial: Monastery of Saints Felix and Fortunatus
- Issue: Pietro Participazio
- Father: Badoer Participazio (?)

Orso II Participazio (died after 931), also known as Orso II Badoer, was the Doge of Venice from c. 911 until his abdication in 931. The surname Participazio (Particiaco) is a later attribution, first recorded by the chronicler John the Deacon in 1008.

His reign was largely peaceful, marked by the renewal of Venice's commercial privileges within the Kingdom of Italy, the maintenance of close ties with the Byzantine Empire. He abdicated in 931 and retired to the Monastery of Saints Felix and Fortunatus on Ammiana, where he spent the remainder of his life. Although never formally beatified by the Holy See, Orso II came to be venerated as a blessed in the local Venetian Church.

== Biography ==
=== Early life ===
Little is known about Orso II's early life. The surname Participazio is a later historiographical attribution. It first appears in the chronicle of John the Deacon, written around 1008, where Orso II is identified as a member of the Participazio family and as the father of the future doge Pietro Partecipazio, better known as Pietro Badoer. Orso II himself is also sometimes referred to as Orso II Badoer. By contrast, the early 13th-century Chronicon Altinate gives him the surname Paureta, while also associating the Badoer and Participazio families.

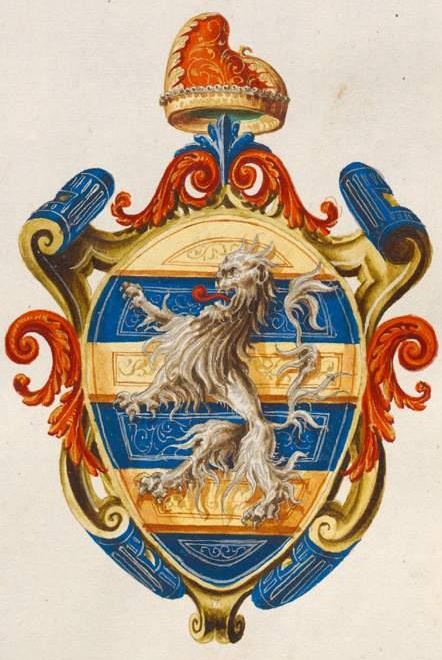
Coat of Arms of the House of Participazio

Modern historians consider Orso II's ancestry uncertain. A possible link between the Participazio and Badoer families is provided by a Badoer (Also spelled Badoario), recorded as a son of doge Orso I Participazio and brother of doge Giovanni II Participazio, who died from wounds sustained during a brief Venetian campaign against Comacchio. If this Badoer was Orso II's father, then Orso's son Pietro Participazio may have adopted his grandfather's given name as a hereditary surname, explaining why later chroniclers referred to him and his father as Badoer while still regarding the family as part of the Participazio lineage.

Nothing is known of Orso's activities before his election as doge.

=== Dogeship ===
Orso II succeeded Pietro Tribuno as Doge of Venice sometime around 911. His reign was comparatively peaceful, largely because his predecessor had successfully repelled the Magyar invasion of 899. After devastating parts of northern Italy and several settlements within the Venetian mainland, including Cittanova, Chioggia, Equilium (Jesolo) and Altinum, the invaders failed to penetrate the lagoon owing to their lack of naval experience and siege capabilities. As a result, Venice enjoyed nearly two decades of relative stability during Orso's government.

One of the earliest events of his reign was the dispatch of his son Pietro to Constantinople to pay homage to the Byzantine emperor Leo VI the Wise, who bestowed upon him the court title of protospatharios. During the return journey, however, Pietro was captured by Prince Michael of Zahumlje and handed over to his ally, Tsar Simeon I of Bulgaria, then at war with the Byzantine Empire. Modern historians generally interpret the incident within the wider context of the Byzantine–Bulgarian war of 913–927 rather than as a simple kidnapping for ransom. Pietro was eventually released through a diplomatic mission led by Domenico, the future Bishop of Malamocco.

While maintaining Venice's traditional alignment with the Byzantine Empire, Orso also cultivated good relations with the Kingdom of Italy, which remained the principal market for Venetian goods brought from the East. In 925 he sent an embassy to King Rudolph II of Burgundy at Pavia, obtaining the renewal and expansion of Venetian commercial privileges within the kingdom. Similar concessions were secured from Rudolph's successor, Hugh of Provence, in 927.

Orso abdicated in 931 and retired to the Monastery of Saints Felix and Fortunatus on the now-vanished island of Ammiana in the northern Venetian Lagoon, where he spent the remainder of his life. The exact date of his death is unknown. Although his abdication has traditionally been regarded as voluntary, some historians have suggested that he may have been compelled to resign by members of the Venetian aristocracy dissatisfied with his cautious foreign policy. His successor, Pietro II Candiano, adopted a markedly more aggressive political and military approach.

== Legacy ==
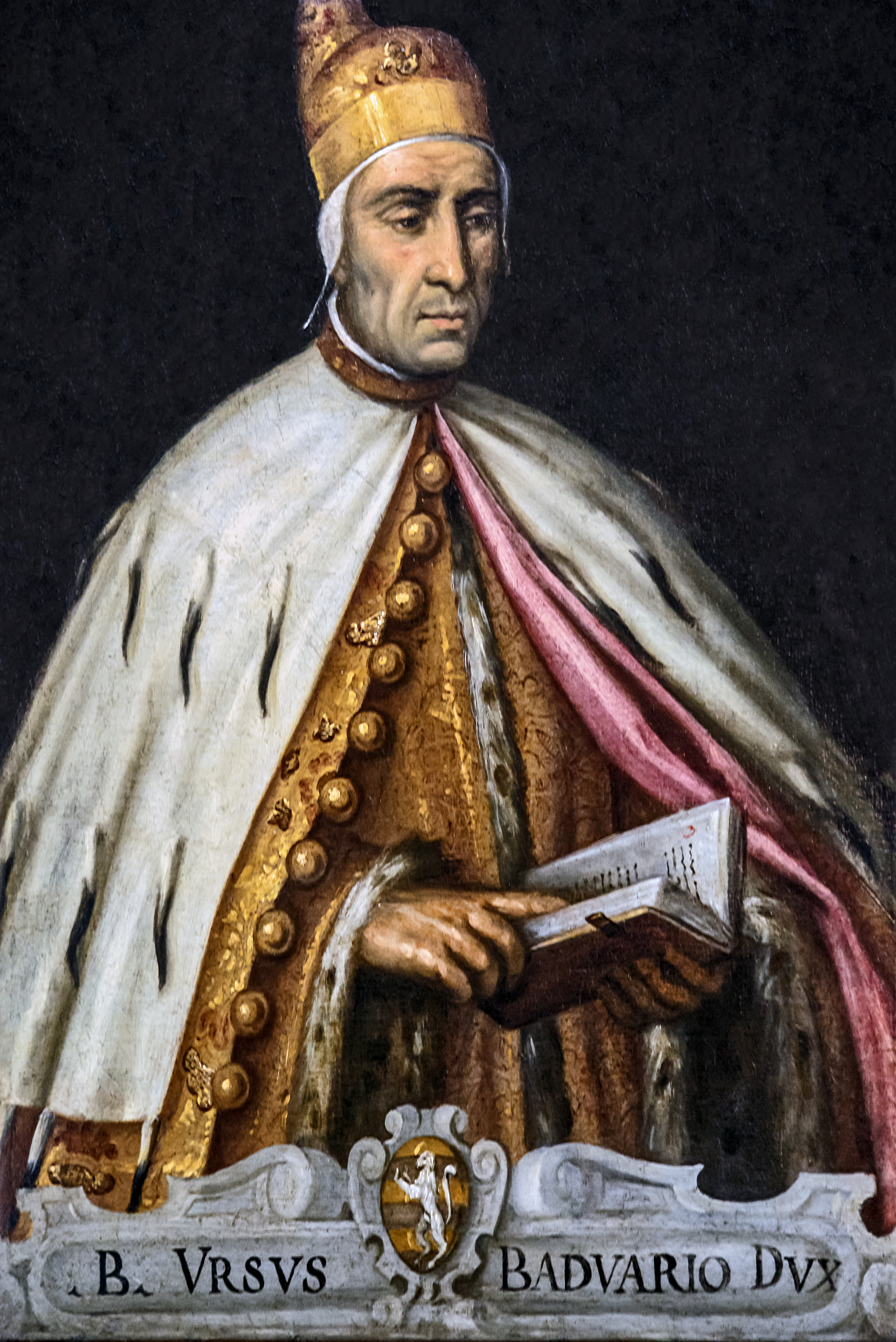
Portiait in the Church of Madonna dell'Orto

Although never formally beatified by the Holy See, Orso II came to be venerated as a blessed in the Venetian Church. His cult remained local, and a 17th century portrait depicting him is preserved in the Chapel of Saint Maurus in the Church of Madonna dell'Orto in Venice.

Orso II Participazio is depicted in the posthumous series of official portraits of the doges of Venice in the Doge's Palace. The original gallery was established in the 1360s under doge Marco Cornaro as a chronological sequence of Venetian rulers, each shown holding a scroll inscribed with a summary of his achievements. After the original paintings were destroyed in the fire of 1577, the series was recreated, with Domenico Tintoretto executing most of the surviving portraits. The scroll held by Orso II Participazio contains the following inscription in latin:

QUOAD DECUIT IUSTITIAM ET PACEM COLUI TANDEM CONCEPTO VOTO IN MONASTERIO SANCTI FELICIS DIEM CLAUSI

[As long as it was fitting for me, I upheld justice and peace; at last, having taken monastic vows, I ended my days in the Monastery of Saint Felix.]

== See also ==
- List of doges of Venice
- Pietro Participazio

== Sources ==
- Pozza, Marco (2014). "PARTICIACO, Orso II". Dizionario Biografico degli Italiani (in Italian). Vol. 81: Pansini–Pazienza. Rome: Istituto dell'Enciclopedia Italiana. ISBN 978-88-12-00032-6.

Political offices
| Preceded by Pietro Tribuno | Doge of Venice; 911–931 | Succeeded by Pietro II Candiano |
