= Felicia Malipiero =

Dogaressa of Venice

Felicia Malipiero (d. after 978) was the Dogaressa of Venice by marriage to the Doge Pietro I Orseolo (r. 976–978) and mother of doge Pietro II Orseolo.

== Life ==
Felicia Malipiero is described as very religious and strict, and spent her time in pious duties. Alongside her spouse, she founded a hospital for pilgrims to the memory of doge Pietro Tradonico: while her spouse spent his time praying before the altar of the hospital, she devoted her time to caring for the sick and menial chores.

When her spouse abdicated and entered a Camaldolese monastery in France, Malipiero entered the Benedictine Monastery of San Zaccaria and became a nun. Although in a monastery, she continued being the adviser of her ruling sons, advising them always to protect the power of the church.

== Notes ==
Preceded by Waldrada of Tuscany	Dogaressa of Venice; 976–978	Marina Candiano
