= Pietro I Orseolo =

Doge of Venice from 976 until 978

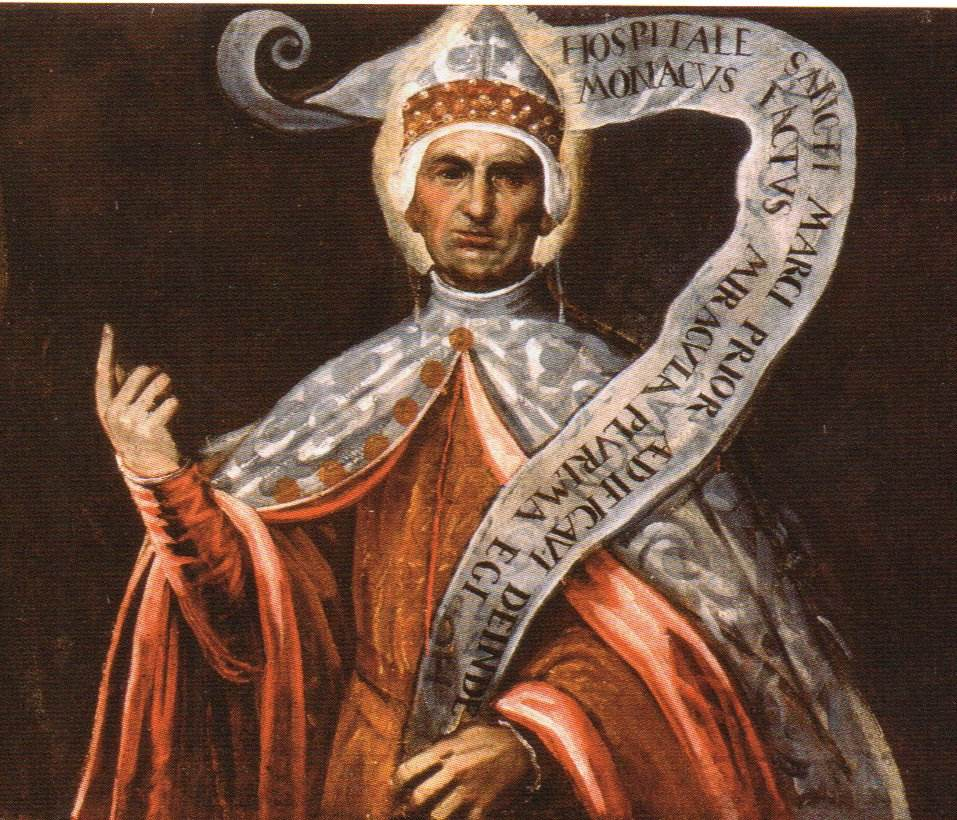
- Portrait in the Doge’s Palace

Doge of Venice
- Reign: 976–978
- Predecessor: Pietro IV Candiano
- Successor: Vitale Candiano
- Born: 928; Udine, Republic of Venice
- Died: 10 January 987; Cuxa, County of Conflent
- Spouse: Felicia Malipiero
- Issue: Pietro II Orseolo; Unnamed daughter
- House: Orseolo

Pietro I Orseolo (928–987) also known as Peter Urseulus, was the Doge of Venice from 976 until 978. He abdicated his office and left in the middle of the night to become a monk. He later entered the order of the Camaldolese Hermits of Mount Corona. He is venerated as a saint in the Eastern Orthodox Church and Roman Catholic Church.

== Biography ==
=== Early life ===
Orseolo was born in 928 near Udine to one of the more powerful families in Venice: the Orseolo were the descendants of Doge Teodato Ipato and Doge Orso Ipato. At the age of 20 he was named commander of the Venetian fleet, performing distinguished service as a soldier; he waged successful campaigns against the Dalmatian pirates. He was also devoted to the Catholic Church. He had one son named Pietro II Orseolo, who also became a Doge, and a daughter who married to Giovanni Morosini, a member of the House of Morosini.

=== Dogeship ===
In 976, the sitting doge, Pietro IV Candiano, was killed in a revolution that protested his attempts to create a monarchy. According to a statement by the Camaldolese monk and cardinal, Peter Damian, Orseolo himself had led a conspiracy against Candiano. This statement, however, cannot be verified. Nonetheless, Orseolo was elected as his successor. His wife and consort was Felicia Malipiero.

As doge, Orseolo demonstrated a good deal of talent in restoring order to an unsettled Venice and showed remarkable generosity in the treatment of his predecessor's widow. He built hospitals and cared for widows, orphans and pilgrims. Out of his own resources he began the reconstruction of the ducal chapel, now St. Mark's Basilica, and the Doge's Palace, which had been destroyed during the revolution, along with a great part of the city. Two years later, on 1 September 978, seemingly without notifying anyone, not even his wife and children, he left Venice with Abbot Guarin and three other Venetians (one of whom was St. Romuald) to join the Benedictine (now Cistercian) abbey at Saint-Michel-de-Cuxa (Catalan: Sant Miquel de Cuixà) in Prades (Catalan: Prada), southern France.

Here Orseolo led a life of great asceticism, performing the most menial tasks. There is some evidence that he had been considering such an action for some time. His only contact with Venice was to instruct his grandson Otto (who would become doge in 1008) in the life of Christian virtue. After some years as a monk at the abbey, probably with the encouragement of Saint Romuald (who later went on to found the Camaldolese branch of the Benedictines), Orseolo left the monastery to become a hermit in the surrounding forest, a calling he followed for seven years until he died. His body is buried in the village church in Prades (Catalan: Prada), France.

In 1733 the Venetian librarian Giuseppe Bettinelli published an edition of a biography written by the Friar Fulgenzio Manfredi in 1606.

== Veneration ==
Saint Pietro Orseolo
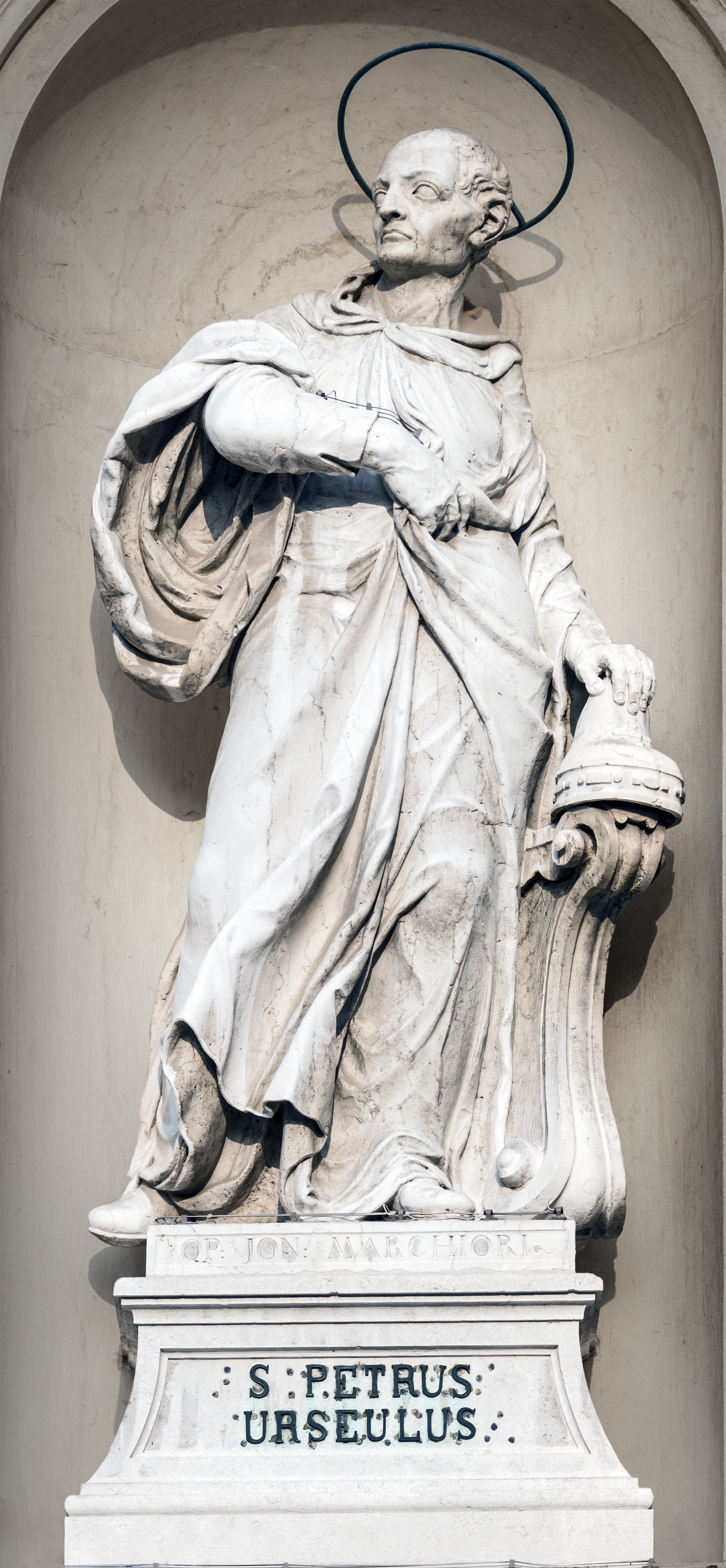
- San Rocco, Venice

OSBCam, Confessor of the Faith
- Venerated in: Eastern Orthodox Church; Roman Catholic Church
- Beatified: 1027 by Arnulf
- Canonized: 1731, Rome, Papal States, by Pope Clement XII
- Major shrine: Prades, Pyrénées-Orientales, France
- Feast: 10 January; 19 January (Camaldolese Hermits)

Forty years after his death, in 1027, Orseolo was officially recognized as a blessed by the local bishop.

Orseolo is venerated as a saint by the Roman Catholic Church, his cultus having been confirmed by his equivalent canonization in 1731 by Pope Clement XII, who set his feast day for 14 January. The reform of the liturgical calendar in 1969 transferred the feast to 10 January, the day of his death. The Camaldolese order celebrates his memory on 19 January.

He is likewise also venerated in the Eastern Orthodox Church, with a feast day on 10 January.

== Legacy ==
Pietro I Orseolo is depicted in the posthumous series of official portraits of the doges of Venice in the Doge's Palace. The original gallery was established in the 1360s under doge Marco Cornaro as a chronological sequence of Venetian rulers, each shown holding a scroll inscribed with a summary of his achievements. After the original paintings were destroyed in the fire of 1577, the series was recreated, with Domenico Tintoretto executing most of the surviving portraits. The scroll held by Pietro I Orseolo contains the following inscription in latin:

HOSPITALE SANCTI MARCI PRIOR ÆDIFICAVI DEINDE MONACUS FACTUS MIRACULA PLURIMA EGI

[I first founded the hospice of Saint Mark, and later, after becoming a monk, I performed numerous miracles.]

== See also ==
- Saint Pietro I Orseolo, patron saint archive
- List of doges of Venice
- Orseolo

Political offices
| Preceded by Pietro IV Candiano | Doge of Venice; 976–978 | Succeeded by Vitale Candiano |
