= Vitale Candiano =

Doge of Venice from 978 until 979

- Portrait in the Doge's Palace

Doge of Venice
- Reign: 1 September 978 – October 979
- Predecessor: Pietro I Orseolo
- Successor: Tribuno Memmo
- Born: c. 930; Venice, Republic of Venice
- Died: November 979 (aged c. 49); Venice, Republic of Venice
- Burial: Abbey of Sant'Ilario in Mira
- Issue: Maria Candiano
- House: Candiano
- Father: Pietro III Candiano (?)
- Mother: Arcielda (?)

Vitale Candiano (Latin: Vitalis Candianus, c. 930 – November 979) was a Venetian patrician who reigned as the Doge of Venice from 1 September 978 until his abdication in October 979. He was the 24th Doge in the traditional numbering.

A member of the powerful Candiano family, he succeeded Pietro I Orseolo and attempted to restore relations with Emperor Otto II following the assassination of his brother Pietro IV Candiano. His brief reign had little political significance and failed to resolve the internal divisions that had troubled Venice since 976. These conflicts were brought to an end only with the election of Pietro II Orseolo in 992.

== Biography ==
=== Early life ===
Very little is known about Vitale's early life. He belonged to the Candiano family, which had dominated Venetian politics since the early 10th century. According to Andrea Dandolo, he was a son of doge Pietro III Candiano and brother of his successor, Pietro IV Candiano, although this identification has been questioned by later historians. He should not be confused with Vitale IV Candiano, Pietro IV's son, who became Patriarch of Grado.

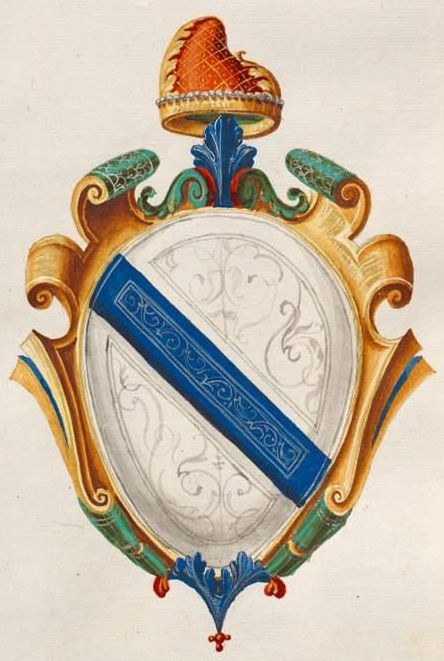
Attributed arms of the House of Candiano

Following Pietro IV's assassination during a revolt in August 976, members of the Candiano family and supporters of the murdered doge sought protection and assistance from Emperor Otto II. Vitale was forced to Saxony but then came back to Venice and became involved in these efforts to restore the family's influence.

=== Dogeship ===
Vitale was elected by the popular assembly on 1 September 978, following the departure of doge Pietro I Orseolo, who had left Venice to retire to the Abbey of Saint-Michel-de-Cuxa. His flight was motivated not only by spiritual concerns but also by the difficult political situation: Venetian politics was deeply divided between a pro-Byzantine faction and a pro-imperial faction, as well as by feuds between the leading families. Shortly after becoming doge, Vitale recalled his nephew, Vitale IV, Patriarch of Grado, who had been expelled following the death of Pietro IV, and reinstated him in his episcopal office. Vitale was tasked with restoring relations with Emperor Otto II, which had broken down following the death of Pietro IV. Vitale failed in this undertaking and, 14 months later, he abdicated for health reasons and retired to the Abbey of Sant'Ilario in Mira. He died four days later and was buried there.

Vitale was succeeded by Tribuno Memmo, son-in-law of Pietro IV, who was elected as part of a compromise. Memmo, too, was a relatively insignificant figure, and it was not until the election of Vitale's son-in-law Pietro II Orseolo in 992 that peace was restored in Venice.

== Legacy ==
Vitale is depicted in the posthumous series of official portraits of the doges of Venice in the Doge's Palace. The original gallery was established in the 1360s under doge Marco Cornaro as a chronological sequence of Venetian rulers, each shown holding a scroll inscribed with a summary of his achievements. After the original paintings were destroyed in the fire of 1577, the series was recreated, with Domenico Tintoretto executing most of the surviving portraits. The scroll held by Vitale contains the following inscription in Latin:

CIVES DISCORDES SEDO MORIOR MONACATUS

[I appease the dissenting citizens; I die having taken monastic vows.]

== Sources ==
- Mastandrea, Pedrocco (2017). i DOGI nei ritratti parlanti di Palazzo Ducale a Venezia. Cierre edizioni. ISBN 978-88-8314-902-3.
- Capasso, Riccardo (1974). "Candiano, Vitale (patriarca)". Dizionario Biografico degli Italiani (in Italian). Vol. 17: Calvart–Canefri. Rome: Institute of the Italian Encyclopaedia. ISBN 978-88-12-00032-6.
- Da Mosto, Andrea (1939). I Dogi di Venezia con particolare riguardo alle loro tombe. Ferdinando Ongania.
- Monticolo, Giovanni, ed. (1890). La cronaca veneziana del diacono Giovanni (PDF). Fonti per la storia d’Italia (Medio Evo). Vol. IX. Rome.
- Zanotto, Francesco (1861). Il Palazzo ducale di Venezia. Vol. 4. Venice.
- Gullino, Giuseppe (2013). "Orseolo, Pietro II". Dizionario Biografico degli Italiani (in Italian). Vol. 79: Nursio–Ottolini Visconti. Rome: Institute of the Italian Encyclopaedia. ISBN 978-88-12-00032-6.
- Pozza, Marco (2015). "Pietro Orseolo, santo (I)". Dizionario Biografico degli Italiani (in Italian). Vol. 83: Piacentini–Pio V. Rome: Institute of the Italian Encyclopaedia. ISBN 978-88-12-00032-6.
- Bertolini, Margherita Giuliana (1974a). "Candiano, Pietro (III)". Dizionario Biografico degli Italiani (in Italian). Vol. 17: Calvart–Canefri. Rome: Institute of the Italian Encyclopaedia. ISBN 978-88-12-00032-6.
- Bertolini, Margherita Giuliana (1974b). "Candiano, Pietro (IV)". Dizionario Biografico degli Italiani (in Italian). Vol. 17: Calvart–Canefri. Rome: Institute of the Italian Encyclopaedia. ISBN 978-88-12-00032-6.

Political offices
Preceded by Pietro I Orseolo	Doge of Venice; 978–979	Succeeded by Tribuno Memmo
