= Giovanniccia Candiano =

Dogaressa of Venice

Dogaressa of Venice
- Reign: 959 - 966
- Predecessor: Arcielda Candiano
- Successor: Waldrada of Tuscany
- Died: after 966
- Spouse: Pietro IV Candiano (divorced 966)
- Issue: Vitale Candiano

Giovanniccia Candiano, also called Giuliana, was Dogaressa of Venice by her marriage to the Doge Pietro IV Candiano (r. 959–976), mother of Vitale Candiano.

== Life ==
Giovanniccia Candiano was not a member of the aristocracy and was previously divorced when Pietro entered into a relationship with her, and when he made her dogaressa after his installation, it caused a scandal and a social boycott which damaged the reputation of the doge. Eventually, Pietro was convinced to divorce her and imprison her as a nun in the convent of San Zaccaria.

She has been the subject of legends and myths. She is a part of a famous deck of cards featuring the dogaressas of Venice, as the Four of Hearts.

== Sources ==
- Staley, Edgcumbe: "The dogaressas of Venice: The wives of the doges"., London: T. W. Laurie, 1910
- "le 62 Dogaresse di Venezia". VENEZIAMUSEO (in Italian).

| Preceded by Arcielda Candiano | Dogaressa of Venice; 959–966 | Waldrada of Tuscany |
