= Chronicon Altinate =

The Chronicon Altinate, Altino Chronicle or Origo civitatum Italie seu Venetiarum is one of the oldest sources for the history of Venice. The oldest known manuscripts date to the 13th century, though its components are older. It has considerable overlap with the Chronicon Gradense, which may be one of its sources. It is sometimes called the Chronicon Venetum, but that title is also used for the Chronicon Venetum et Gradense of John the Deacon (ca. 1008).

It is not a true chronicle, but rather a compilation of documents and legends about the emergence of Venice and the origin of the Venetians. There are also lists of bishops, popes, doges and emperors, as well as church registers and chronicle entries. The most important manuscripts are in the Vatican, Venice and Dresden, but their relationships, and those of other manuscripts, is unclear.

Compared to the earlier Chronicon Venetum et Gradense, it is "a more richly articulated and satisfyingly detailed account of a primitive foundation of the city", taking its origins back to Orpheus and Troy, and replacing the story of an attack by the Lombards with an earlier attack by Attila the Hun, portraying the Venetians as Christians fleeing pagans. These legends are with no foundation in any ancient texts, and function as a way of constructing a "spurious antiquity" as a foundation of "civic dignity".

It continues by recounting the story of the citizens of Altinum (modern Quarto d'Altino) taking refuge in Torcello, to which they transferred their church with the relics of Saint Heliodorus, their founding bishop.
