= Tribuno Memmo =

Doge of Venice from 979 to 991

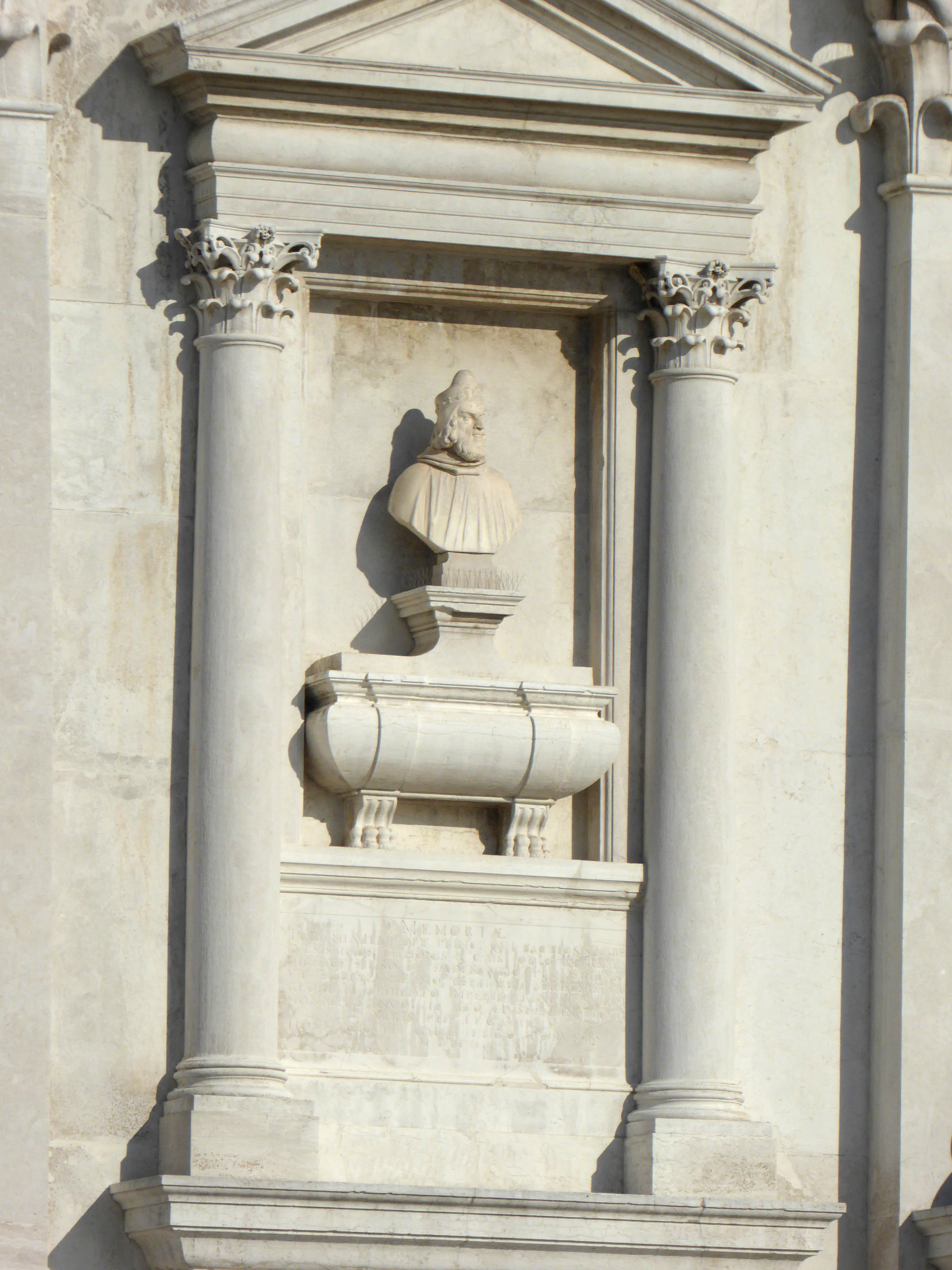
- Statue of Tibuno Memmo

25th Doge of Venice
- In office 979–991
- Preceded by: Vitale Candiano
- Succeeded by: Pietro II Orseolo

Personal details
- Born: Unknown
- Died: 991
- Spouse: Marina Candiano
- Children: Maurizio

Tribuno Memmo (died 991) was the 25th Doge of Venice who served from 979 to 991.

== History ==
He was illiterate and according to preserved documents, he signed via signum manus.

He was rich, partly due to marriage to dogaressa Marina Candiano, daughter of the 22nd Doge Pietro IV Candiano. They had a son, Maurizio.

It seems that he had only moved into the Ducal Palace toward the end of his dogeship. It was still in repairs following the fire which occurred during the overthrow of Pietro IV Candiano. During his dogeship, St Mark's Basilica became by decree a ducal property, a sort of private chapel in which the ecclesiastical functions were delegated to the primicerius. On 7 June 983, Emperor Otto II renewed the commercial privileges that had already been enjoyed by many previous Doges.

He died in 991 and was succeeded by Pietro II Orseolo.

Political offices
Preceded by Vitale Candiano	Doge of Venice; 979–991	Succeeded by Pietro II Orseolo
