= Pietro III Candiano =

Doge of Venice from 942 until 959

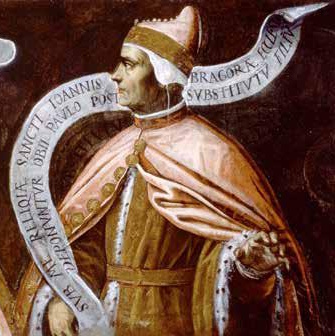
- Portrait in the Doge’s Palace

21st Doge of Venice
- In office 942–959
- Preceded by: Pietro Participazio
- Succeeded by: Pietro IV Candiano

Personal details
- Born: Unknown
- Died: 959
- Spouse: Arcielda Candiano
- Children: Pietro IV Candiano; Domenigo Candiano; Vitale Candiano; Stefano Candiano; Elena Candiano
- Parent: Pietro II Candiano

Pietro III Candiano was the Doge of Venice from 942 until 959. He was the son of Pietro II Candiano.

== Life ==
In 948 he led a fleet of 33 galleys to punish the Dalmatian pirates, the Narentines, for repeatedly raiding against Venetian shipping in the Adriatic Sea. After the attempt failed, he tried again, but the result was a peace treaty that made the Venice pay tribute to the Narentines for safe passage for the next 50 years, until Doge Pietro II Orseolo's reign. His dogaressa was Arcielda Candiano.

== Marriage and issue ==
Pietro and Arcielda had:

- Doge Pietro IV Candiano (930 - 976)
- Domenigo Candiano
- Vitale Candiano, Bishop of Torcello, Doge of Venice (-979)
- Stefano Candiano
- Elena Candiano.

== Sources ==
- Lane, Frederic Chapin (1973). Venice, A Maritime Republic. Johns Hopkins University Press.
- Staley, Edgcumbe (1901). The Dogaressas of Venice : The Wives of the Doges. T. W. Laurie.

Political offices
Preceded by Pietro Participazio	Doge of Venice; 942–959	Succeeded by Pietro IV Candiano
