= Pietro IV Candiano =

Doge of Venice from 959 to 976

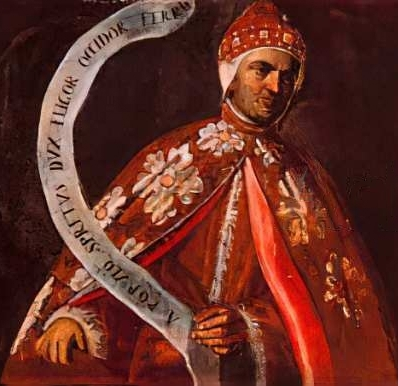
- Portrait in the Doge’s Palace

22nd Doge of Venice
- In office 959–976
- Preceded by: Pietro III Candiano
- Succeeded by: Pietro I Orseolo

Personal details
- Born: 925 Venice
- Died: 976 Venice
- Resting place: St. Ilario Monastery
- Spouse(s): Giovanniccia, Waldrada
- Parent(s): Pietro III Candiano; Arcielda Candiano

Pietro IV Candiano (925–976) was the twenty-second (traditional) or twentieth (historical) doge of Venice from 959 to his death. He was the eldest son of Pietro III Candiano, with whom he co-reigned and whom he was elected to succeed.

== Rise ==
Pietro was appointed co-doge by his father. However, towards the end of his father's dogeship, Pietro IV revolted against him, but failed thanks to popular support for the doge. Pietro III pleaded for his son's life and managed to prevent his execution, but could not stop his exile.

The rebellion of Pietro IV was probably related to the situation in Italy at the time. Pietro IV had supported Berengar II, the Frankish king of Italy, while his father pursued a neutral policy. Berengar II's Kingdom of Italy was taken over by Otto I (who would later become Holy Roman Emperor) in 952. Berengar swore loyalty to Otto I, who gave him back the title of king of Italy as vassal king. Berengar later revolted against Otto, attacking the March of Verona and invading the Papal States.

The exiled Pietro IV went to Ivrea, where the margrave, Guy of Ivrea took him to his father, Berengar II. He then joined the military campaigns which Adalbert, the son of Berengar II, and Hubert, were conducting against Theobald II, Duke of Spoleto and Camerino. Berengar II allowed Pietro to conduct military operations in Ravenna. With six ships from Ravenna, he captured seven Venetian ships. He returned to Venice when his father died, two and a half months after he had been exiled.

== Dogeship ==
When Pietro III died in 959, Pietro IV surprisingly became the next doge.

Probably due to the turbulent recent past, Pietro imposed an oath of loyalty to his power, which was not a Venetian custom. It was probably an import from the mainland. He resumed Venice's relationship with the Byzantine Empire, which his father had interrupted. He renewed a ban of the slave trade. His ban was with regard to this trade with the Byzantines. No Venetian could lend money to them which would be used to buy slaves, transport slaves to their territories or receive money from them to carry slaves.

In a nepotist move, Pietro had the rival candidate to the position of Bishop of Torcello accused of simony, blinded and expelled so that he could install his brother Vitale to this bishopric. In 969 he procured him the Patriarchate of Grado, the most powerful ecclesiastic position in the duchy of Venice.

Pietro destroyed Oderzo, which controlled the routes towards northern Europe. He subdued Ferrara, which was emerging as the main trade centre in the area of the River Po and competed with Venice over trade in this area.

For political reasons, Pietro repudiated his first wife, Giovanniccia, forcing her into the monastery of San Zaccaria. He had a son with her, Vitale. In 966, Pietro remarried to Waldrada, the daughter of Hubert, the marquis of Tuscany, and a cousin of the wife of the emperor Otto I. As the most powerful woman in Italy, Waldrada brought Pietro a large dowry both in money and properties in Friuli, the March of Treviso, Andria and the Ferrara area. The location of these properties is unclear.

Pietro's actions were probably related to the changing political situation in Italy. In 961/64 Otto I had made a second expedition to Italy, took the title of king of Italy, defeated Berengar II and imprisoned him in 963. In 966 Adalbert, the son of Berengar, rebelled but was defeated. Otto I was firmly in charge of Italy. Betrolini notes that various historians think that there was an alliance between Otto I and Pietro IV and that this is indicated by Pietro's marriage to Waldrada, a relative of Otto, and the fact that in 963 Otto I confirmed the monastery of San Zaccaria's property in the county of Padua in favour to its abbess Giovanna, who was probably Pietro's first wife, and granted tax assets in the county of Treviso to a Vitale Candiano, whom they identify as Pietro's brother (both counties were in the Kingdom of Italy).

Guido Mor disagrees with this interpretation. He thinks that the links Pietro had with Berengar II, especially those with Waldrada's father, when he was in exile (see above) initially made an alliance with Otto I unlikely. He points out that Waldrada's father had been hostile to Otto I during his second expedition and had to flee in 962-63 and suggests that Pietro's second marriage might have taken place then, in 962–63, and that it sealed his support to Otto's opponents. He also argues that Otto's mentioned grants were to people Pietro had alienated. Giovanna, as a repudiated wife, must have been hostile to Pietro. Mor also thinks that the mentioned Vitale Candiano was not Pietro's brother, but the son he had with Giovanniccia, who had been forced into the priesthood. He sees Otto's grants as measures to create ties with a Venetian faction which was opposed to Pietro.

To Mor other measures Otto took also indicate his hostility towards Pietro. When Otto crushed the anti-Otto faction, he gave privileges to the bishop of Belluno, whose seat was in Oderzo, and allowed the bishop of Padua, whose territory bordered that of Venice, to build a castle. Mor sees Pietro's mentioned military actions against Oderzo and Ferrara as being part of his opposition to Otto. When Otto secured his control over Italy, Pietro was forced to change stance and to seek a rapprochement with Otto and his own opponents in Venice because he lost his anti-Otto supporters on the mainland and the Byzantines, who had supported resistance to Otto, were routed in Sicily in 965. Betrolini notes that it is difficult to ascertain which of the two interpretations is more likely due to uncertainties regarding the chronology of the main events (Pietro's attacks on the two towns, his marriage to Waldrada and Otto's pardon of Waldrada's father) and the identification of Vitale Candiano.

Staley Edgcumbe had a different take regarding the repudiation of Giovanniccia. She had been a divorcee (which was frowned upon in those days) and she was originally Pietro's mistress whom he took into the Doge's Palace when he ousted his father. This was a scandal and Pietro eventually yielded to the popular feelings and forced her to take a vow of chastity and go to the monastery. Giovanniccia disowned the child she had with Pietro, Vitale, and gave him for fostering. He was then put in a monastery. In 987 he became the bishop of Aquileia. However, this take does not take into account the fact that Pietro married Giovanniccia.

During his third expedition to Italy (965-66), Otto I decided to define his relationship with the duchy Venice in the context of settling the situation in Italy. In 967 Otto I renewed the old Pactum Lotharii between the duchy of Venice and the Kingdom of Italy, which defined the boundaries of the duchy and its economic relations with the kingdom. The treaty dated back to 840 and thus it was 127 years old. This constituted a marked restriction compared to the further concessions the Venetians had gained later. There was a reduction of the territory of the duchy. It lost Brondolo and Fossone, to the south of the Lagoon of Venice. Both were important for their saltworks and were on the inland trade waterways of the rivers Brenta and Adige. The border north of Cittanova, from where the routes to northern Europe started, was no longer defined, which led to disputes and to a long fight that doge Pietro II Orseolo (991-1009) undertook in 995–96 against the belligerent bishop of Belluno. A new tax which increased the tax burden on goods was introduced.

In 971 the Byzantine emperor John I Tzimisces imposed a ban on the sale military material (wood and weapons) to the Arabs. Ships that breached this and the men and goods they carried would be burned. This was aimed against the Fatimid Caliphate, as a war between the empire and the califate broke out again in that year. Pietro complied, but this undermined Venice's economic interests as trade with the Arab coast of North Africa, which was short of wood, was an important part of Venetian trade. Wood for furnishing was excluded from the ban, but this was of little relief.

The ban was not instituted by a decree of the doge, but by an oath (carta promissiones) by the popular assembly to abstain from the banned acts with a penal clause regarding breaches chosen freely by the assembly. The fact that the ban was adopted by the will of the popular assembly, rather than by a ducal decree crystallised the gulf that had developed between the doge and the people and the isolation of the former from the latter. Cessi sees this as a legislative overturning. It was a precursor to the shift in the balance of power between the doge and the people which was to lead to the formation of the Venetian Republic in the 12th century and the custom of the doge giving a ducal promissio (promissio domini ducis), an oath, on assuming power to be loyal to the Republic and to recognise the limitations to his powers created by the Republic.

In 976 the people of Venice rebelled against Pietro. Betrolini argues that there was discontent with Pietro's foreign policy. The relations with Otto I led to economic sacrifices. The economic repercussions of the Byzantine ban increased animosity. His favouritism for his relatives was disliked. Norwich sees Pietro having become too powerful as the cause. His acquisition, though his wife's dowry, of personal estates on the mainland under the vassalage of the emperor made him look like a mainland feudal lord, which was alien to the Venetians. His living isolated from the people with a bodyguard of mercenaries hired from his mainland possessions and his manoeuvring to acquire family control of the top of the church made him all-powerful. When he asked the Venetians to help him to defend his personal interests in the Ferrara area, the rebellion broke out.

Staley Edgcumbe wrote that the rebellion was due to the fact that both the doge and his wife were disliked and too powerful. They were seen as being haughty and living in “proud and contentious isolation.” Waldrada was seen as being petulant and the fact that she was accompanied by Florentine guards was disliked. Pietro was seen as being vainglorious and treated the nobles and officials with “coldness and disdain”. He had a retinue of Tuscans and Greeks and Germans. He also formed a clique of members of the branches of his family form Padua and Vicenza whose power was a threat to the established order.

== Death ==
In 976 the Doge's Palace was attacked. Since the palace was like a fortress, it was set alight. The doge was forced to come out and he was killed, together with his young son Pietro by Waldrada, by some notables (among whom there were some of his relatives). Their bodies were thrown in the slaughterhouse, but were later recovered and buried in the monastery of Sant'Ilario, in Fusina, on the mainland coast of the Lagoon of Venice, perhaps because Pietro owned large estates in the area. Two previous doges, Agnello e Giustiniano Partecipazio, who founded the monastery, were also buried there.

As the fire spread, some 300 buildings were destroyed, including the churches of St Mark's, the old San Teodoro, and the newly completed Santa Maria Zobenigo.

Waldrada managed to escape the attack, taking her young daughter Marina with her. She fled to the empress Adelaide, the mother of the new emperor, Otto II, in Verona. She appealed to Otto II to set fire to Venice and imprison its people. She demanded the reconstitution of her dowry. The new doge, Pietro I Orseolo, sent an envoy to Piacenza to discuss her claim with Otto II. These were amended in a way that satisfied both parties (Pietro IV had introduced the Mundio, a custom which was new in Venice, in which the doge conferred one fourth of his personal assets to his wife; Venice had confiscated Pietro's freehold estates). Waldrada issued a receipt (carta securitatis) to the new doge and the Venetian people.

Marina married Tribuno Memmo, who was doge in 979–991.

== Sources ==
- Bertolini, Margherita Giuliana, Dizionario Biografico degli Italiani - Volume 17
- Cessi, Roberto (ed), Le origini del ducato veneziano, 1951 pp. 99–142.
- Cessi, Roberto, Pacta Ottoniana, in Le origini del ducato veneziano, 1951, pp. 309–13
- Cessi Roberto, Venezia ducale, I, Duca e popolo, Venezia 1963, pp. 256 n. 1, 288–293, 321–333, 338 s., 340, 343; Vol II, pp. 166, 190 n. 78
- Edgcumbe, Staley: The dogaressas of Venice : The wives of the doges
- Fanta, A., Die Verträge der Kaiser mit Venedig bis zum Jahre 983, in Mittheilungen des Instituts für österreichische Geschichtsforschung, Supplement I, 1885, pp. 97 s., 101
- Lanfranchi L, G. Zille G., Ilterritorio del ducato veneziano dall'VIII al XII secolo, in Storia di Venezia, II, 1958, pp. 6, 46;
- Luzzatto G, L'economia veneziana nei suoi rapporti con la politica nell'Alto Medio Evo, pp. 157
- Mor, Giulio Carlo, L'età feudale, I-II, 1952
- Norwich, John, Julius, A History of Venice, Penguin Book, reissued edition, 2012

Political offices
Preceded by Pietro III Candiano	Doge of Venice; 959–976	Succeeded by Pietro I Orseolo
