= Santi Giovanni e Paolo, Venice =

Basilica dei Santi Giovanni e Paolo
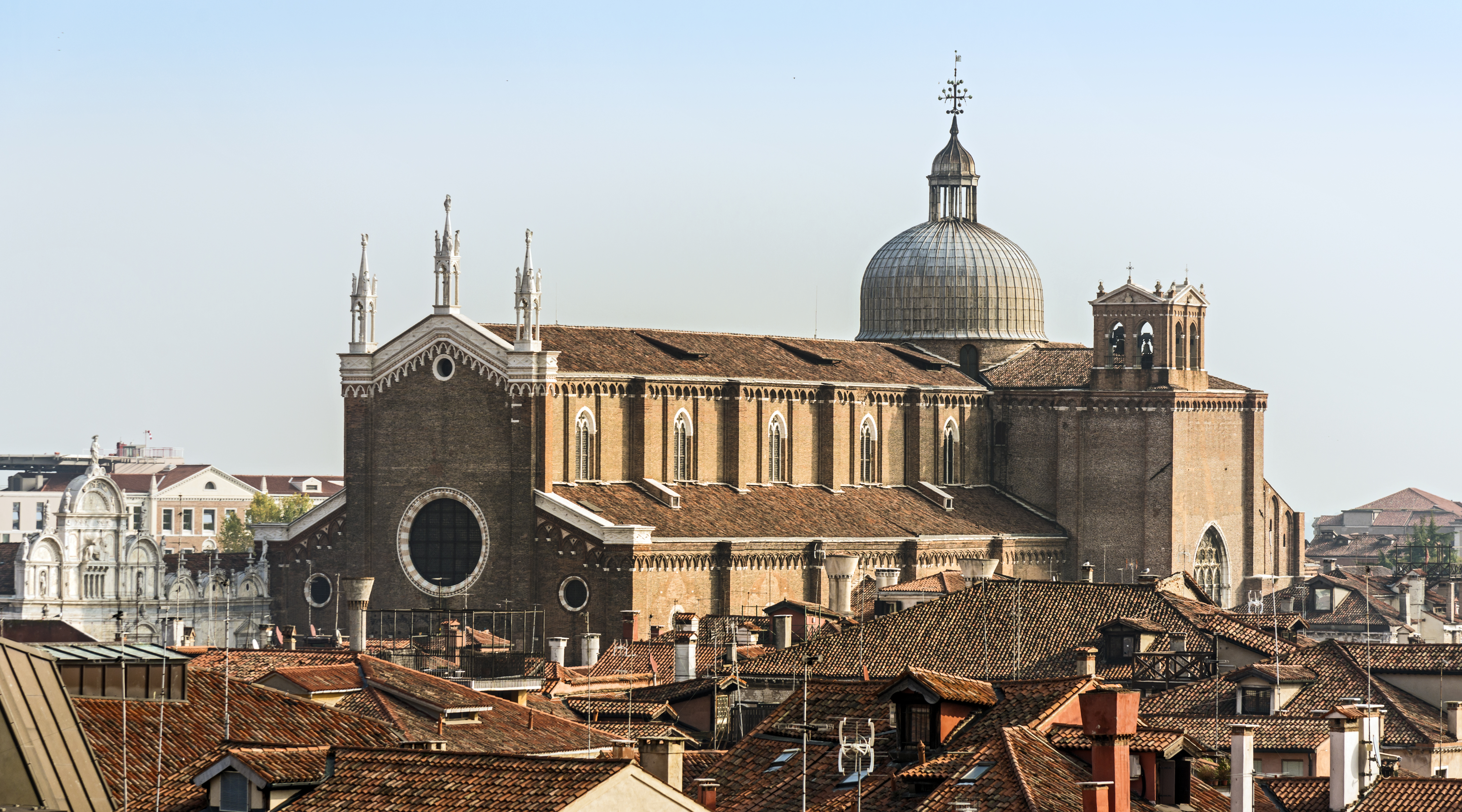
- Santi Giovanni e Paolo in Castello
- Click the map for an interactive, fullscreen view
- 45.4392°N 12.3421°E
- Location: Venice
- Country: Italy
- Denomination: Catholic Church
- Religious order: Dominican
- Website: santigiovanniepaolo.it/en/main-home-english-2/

History
- Status: Minor basilica Conventual church
- Dedication: John and Paul
- Consecrated: 1430

Architecture
- Architectural type: Church
- Style: Venetian Gothic architecture
- Groundbreaking: 1250
- Completed: 1338

Specifications
- Length: 101.6 metres (333 ft)
- Width: 32 metres (105 ft)

The Basilica dei Santi Giovanni e Paolo, known in Venetian as San Zanipolo, is a Catholic minor basilica and Dominican conventual church in the Castello sestiere of Venice, Italy.

It is one of the largest churches in the city of Venice. After the 15th century the funeral services of all of Venice's doges were held here, and twenty-five doges are buried in the church.

== Description ==
The huge brick edifice was designed in the Italian Gothic style, and consecrated in the 1430. It is the principal Dominican church of Venice, and as such was built to hold large congregations. It is dedicated to John and Paul, not the Biblical Apostles of the same names, but two obscure martyrs of the Early Christian church in Rome, whose names were recorded in the 4th century but whose legend is of a later date.

In 1246, Doge Jacopo Tiepolo donated some swampland to the Dominicans after dreaming of a flock of white doves flying over it. The first church was demolished in 1333, when the current church was begun. It was not completed until 1430.

The vast interior contains many funerary monuments and paintings, as well as the Madonna della Pace, a miraculous Byzantine image situated in its own chapel in the south aisle, and a foot of Saint Catherine of Siena, the church's chief relic.

Santi Giovanni e Paolo is a parish church of the Vicariate of San Marco-Castello. Other churches of the parish are San Lazzaro dei Mendicanti, the Ospedaletto and the Beata Vergine Addolorata.

The Renaissance Equestrian Statue of Bartolomeo Colleoni (1483), by Andrea del Verrocchio, is located next to the church.

The belltower has 3 bells in D major.

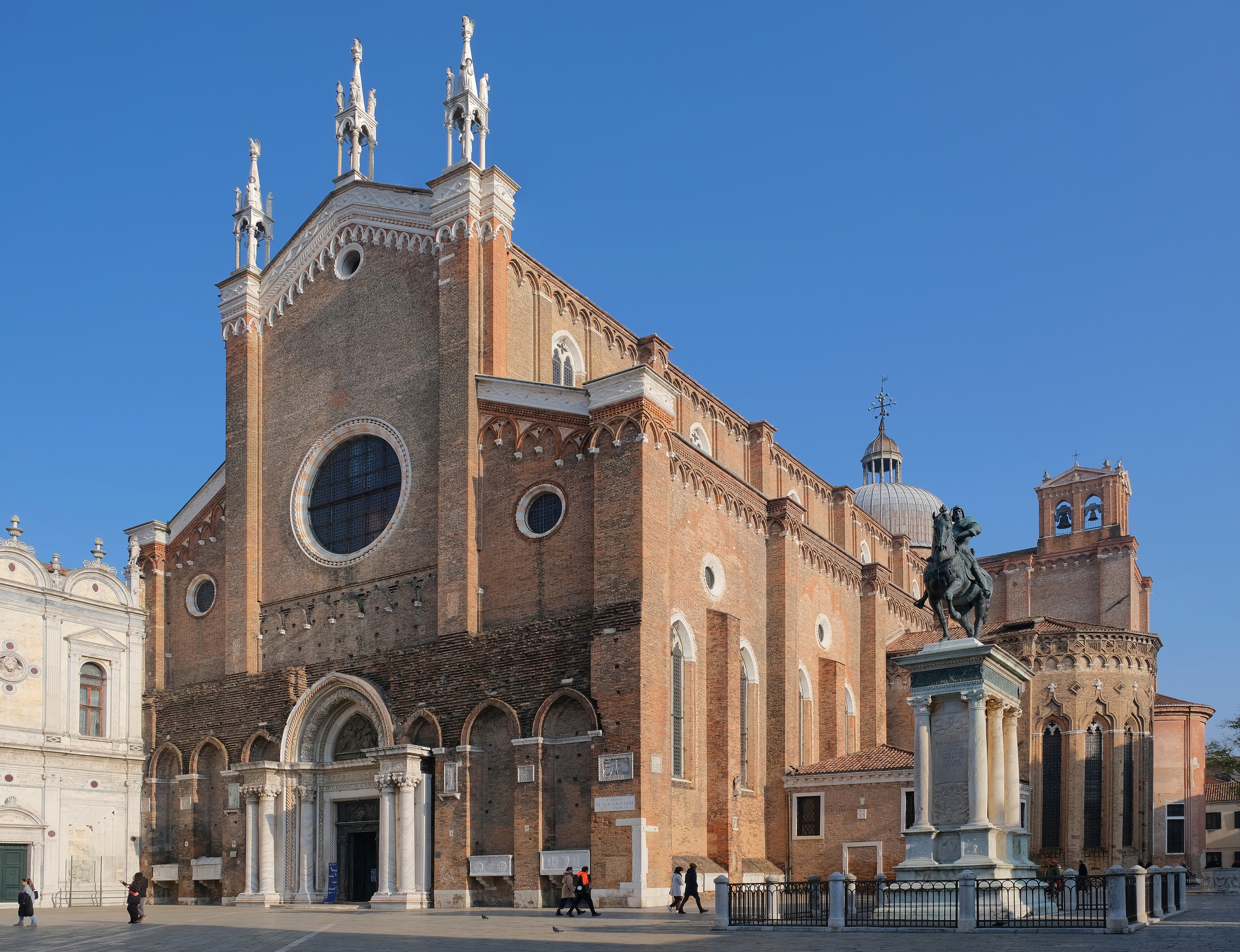
The facade of Santi Giovanni e Paolo.

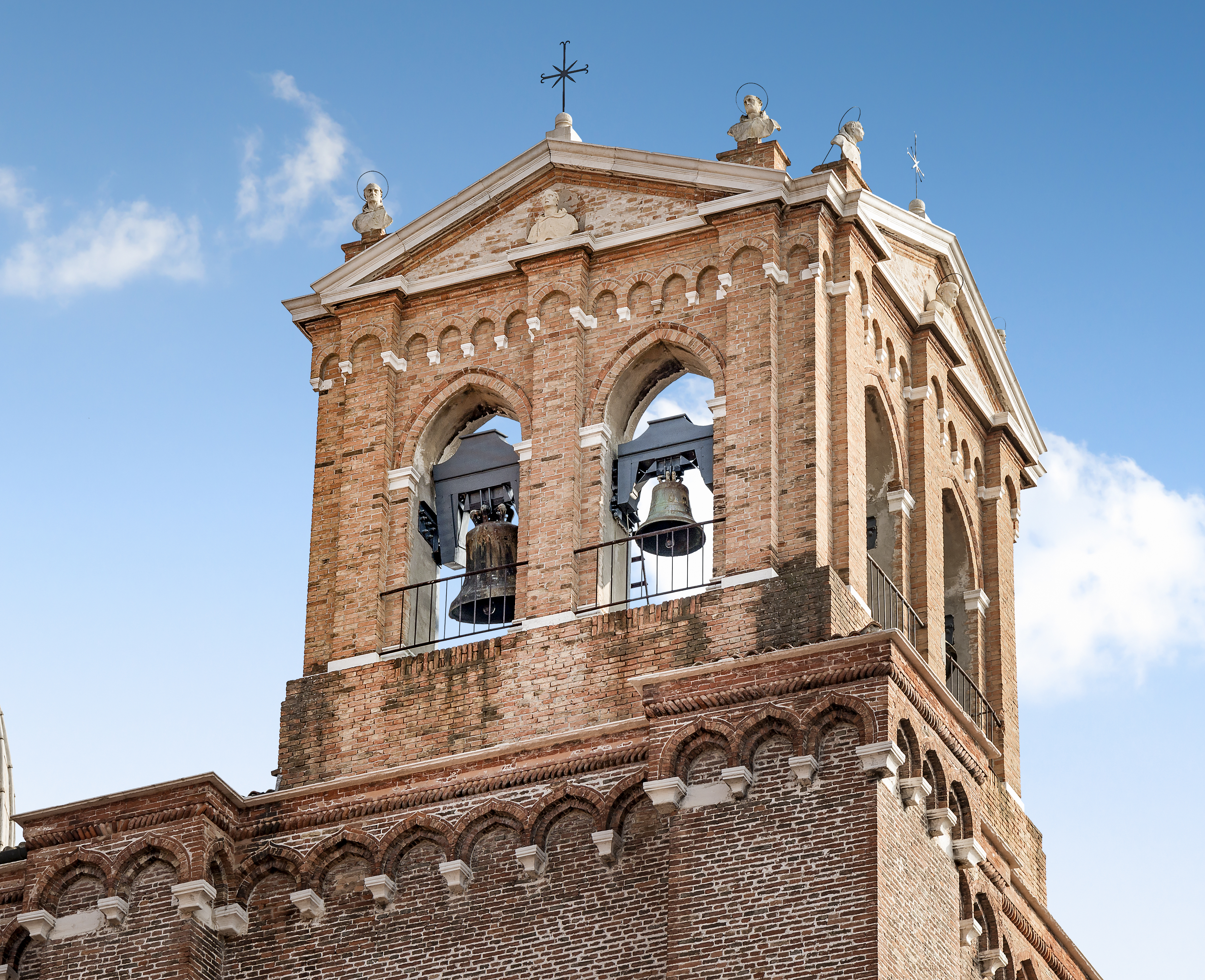
Bel-gable

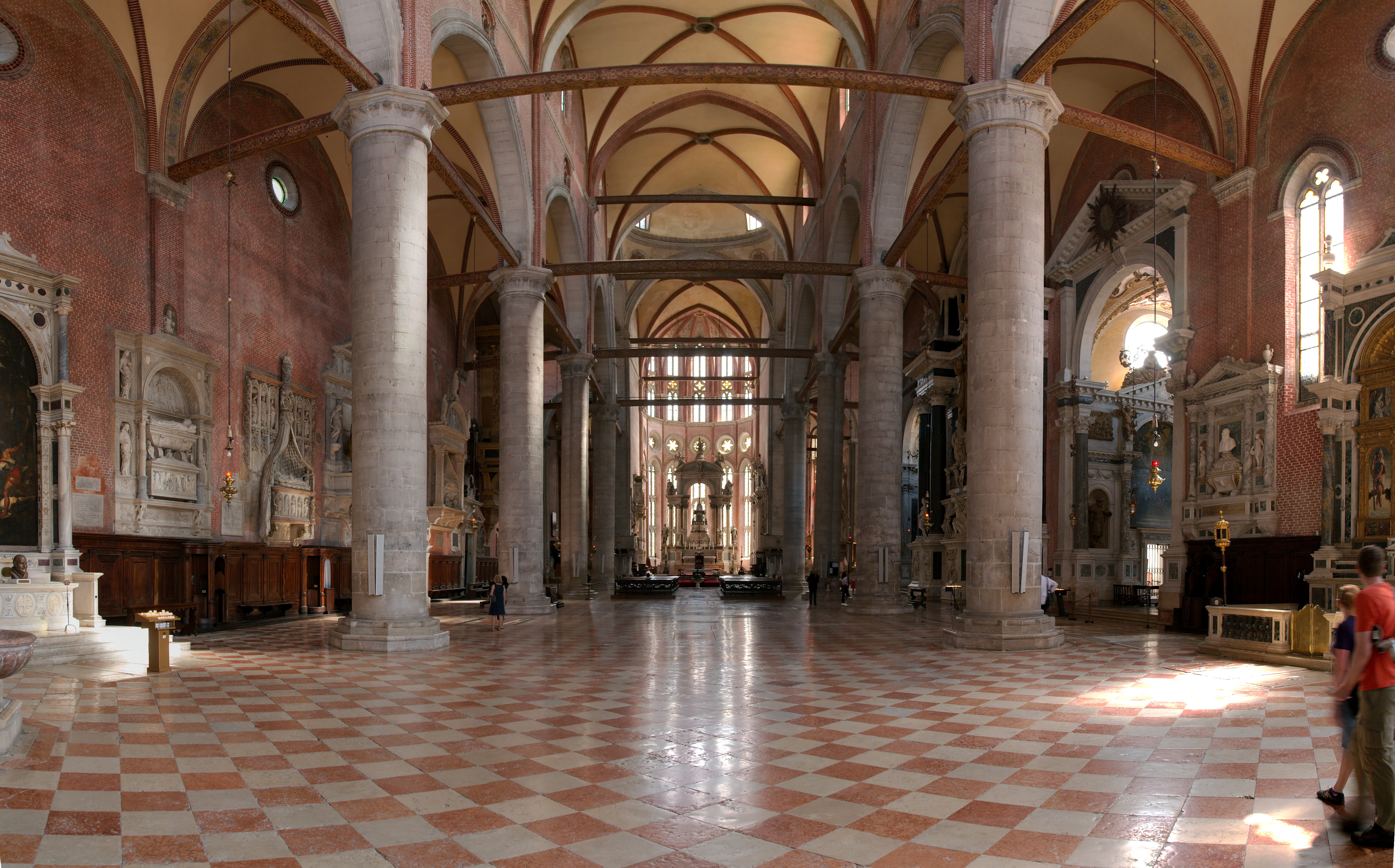
Interior of the church.

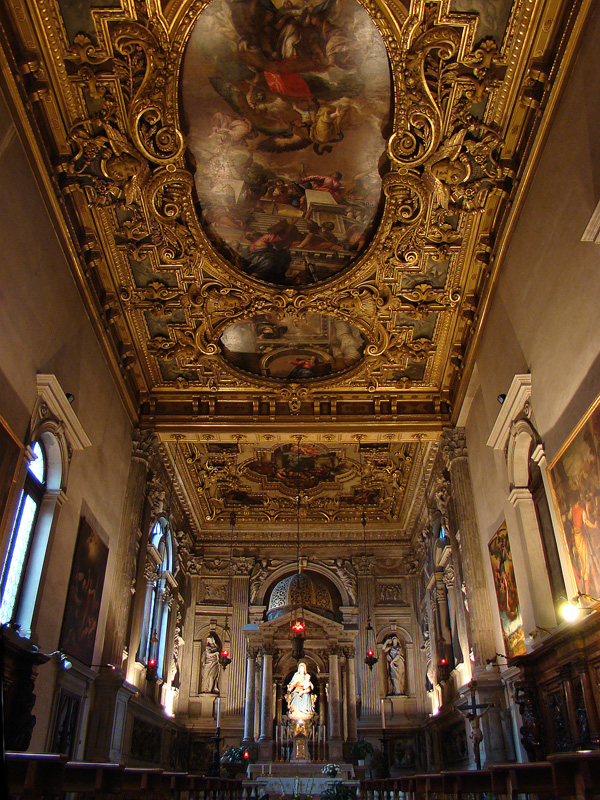
Chapel of the Rosary.

== Notable artists ==
- Giovanni Bellini (Saint Vincent Ferrer Altarpiece in the south aisle)
- Bartolomeo Bon (the great west doorway)
- Cima da Conegliano or Giovanni Martini da Udine (Coronation of the Virgin in the south transept)
- Lorenzo Gramiccia (Madonna del Rosario in Capella di Trinita)
- Piero di Niccolò Lamberti and Giovanni di Martino (tomb of Doge Tommaso Mocenigo in the north aisle)
- Gregorio Lazzarini (sala S. Tommaso)
- Pietro Lombardo (tombs of Doge Pietro Mocenigo on the west wall and Doges Pasquale Malipiero and Nicolo Marcello in the north aisle; tomb of Alvise Diedo in the south aisle)
- Tullio Lombardo ( and Alessandro Leopardo?) (Funerary monument of Doge Andrea Vendramin on the north wall of the choir)
- Lorenzo Lotto (St Antoninus Giving Alms in the south transept)
- Rocco Marconi (Christ between SS Peter and Andrew in the south transept)
- Giuseppe Maria Mazza (five large bronze reliefs depicting the miracles of Saint Dominic in the Chapel of San Dominico)
- Giovanni Battista Piazzetta (St Dominic in Glory on the ceiling of the Capella di San Domenico)
- Alvise Tagliapietra, reliefs in the Chapel of the Rosary
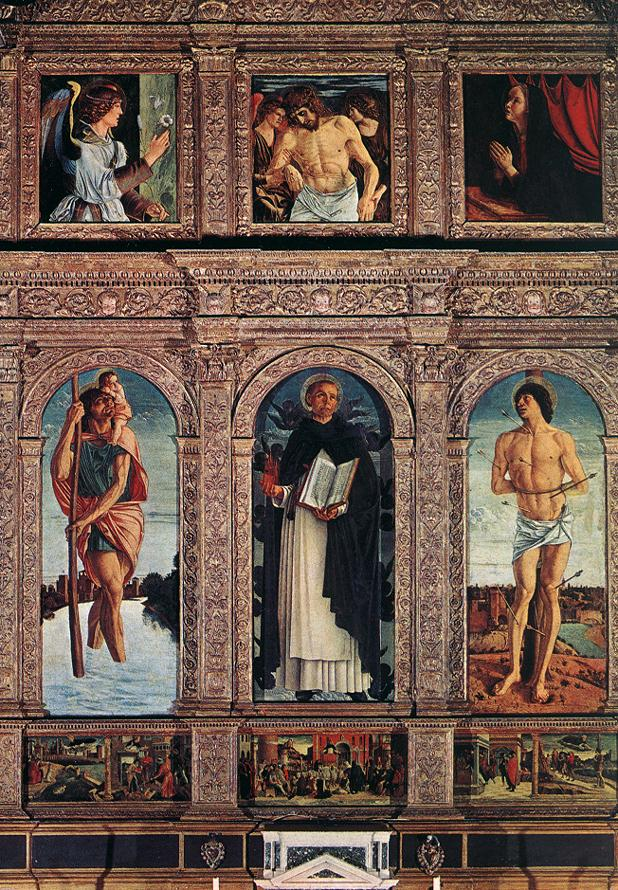
Giovanni Bellini (SS Vincent Ferrer, Christopher and Sebastian)

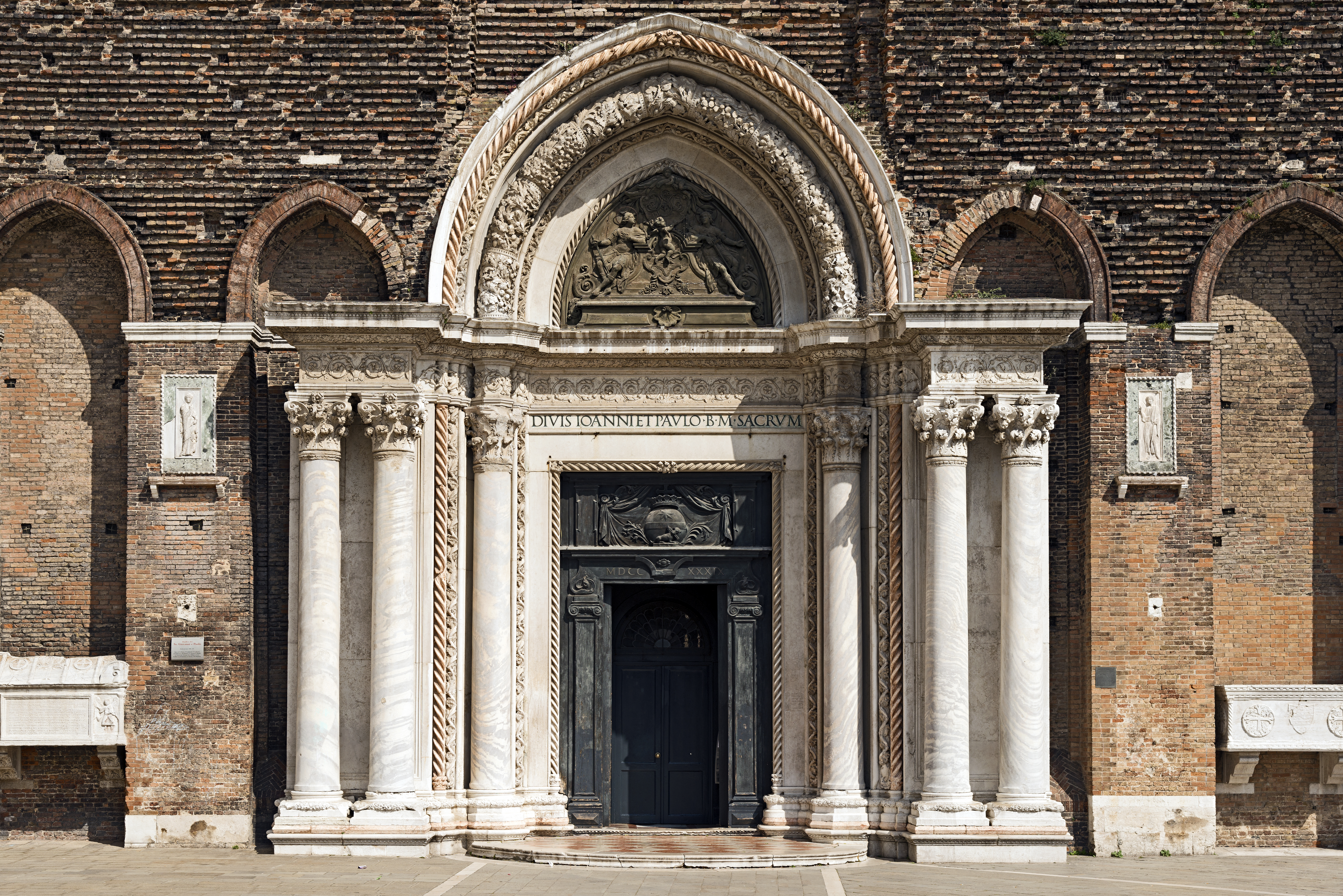
Bartolomeo Bon (the great west doorway)

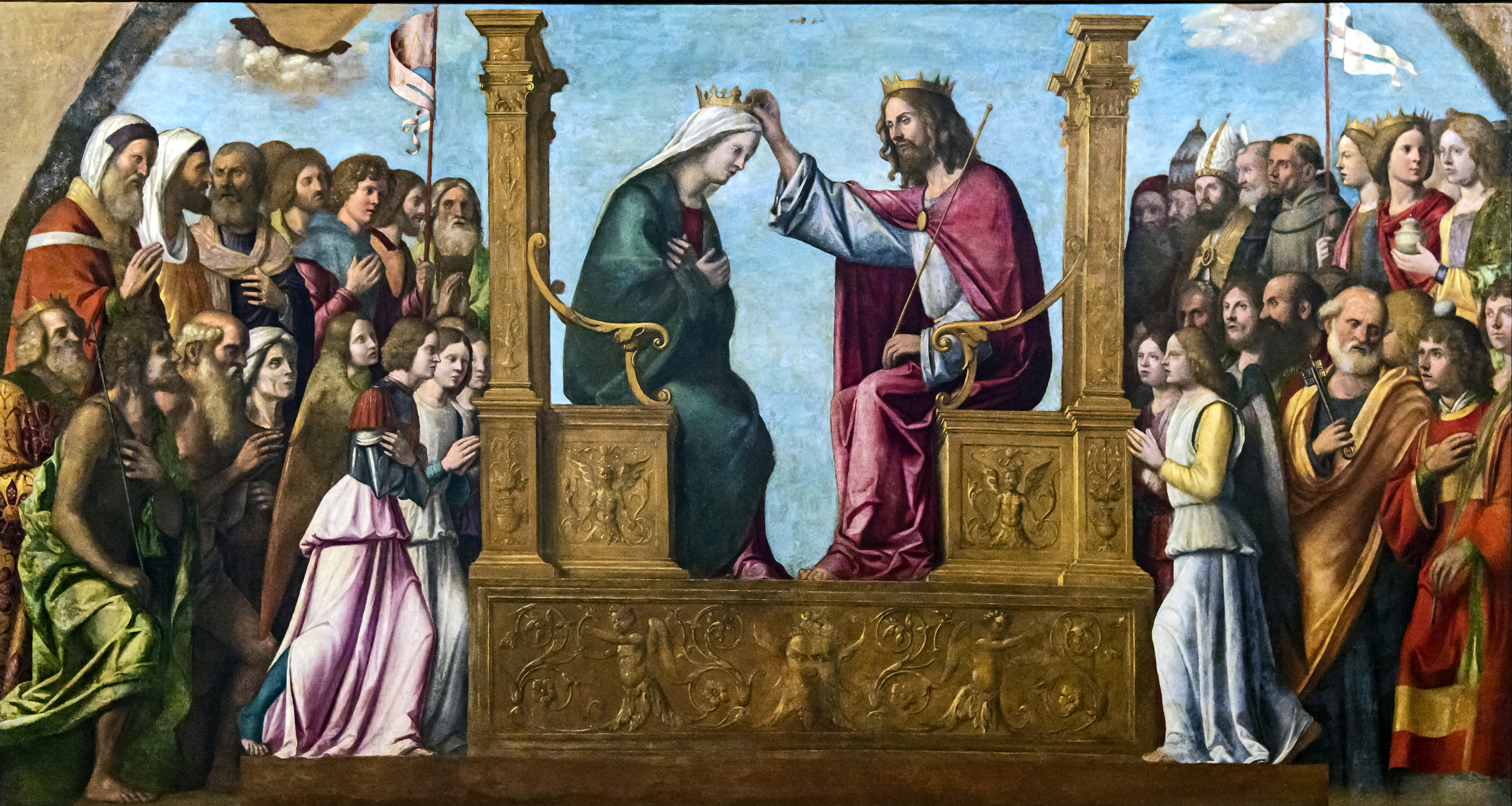
Cima da Conegliano Coronation of the Virgin

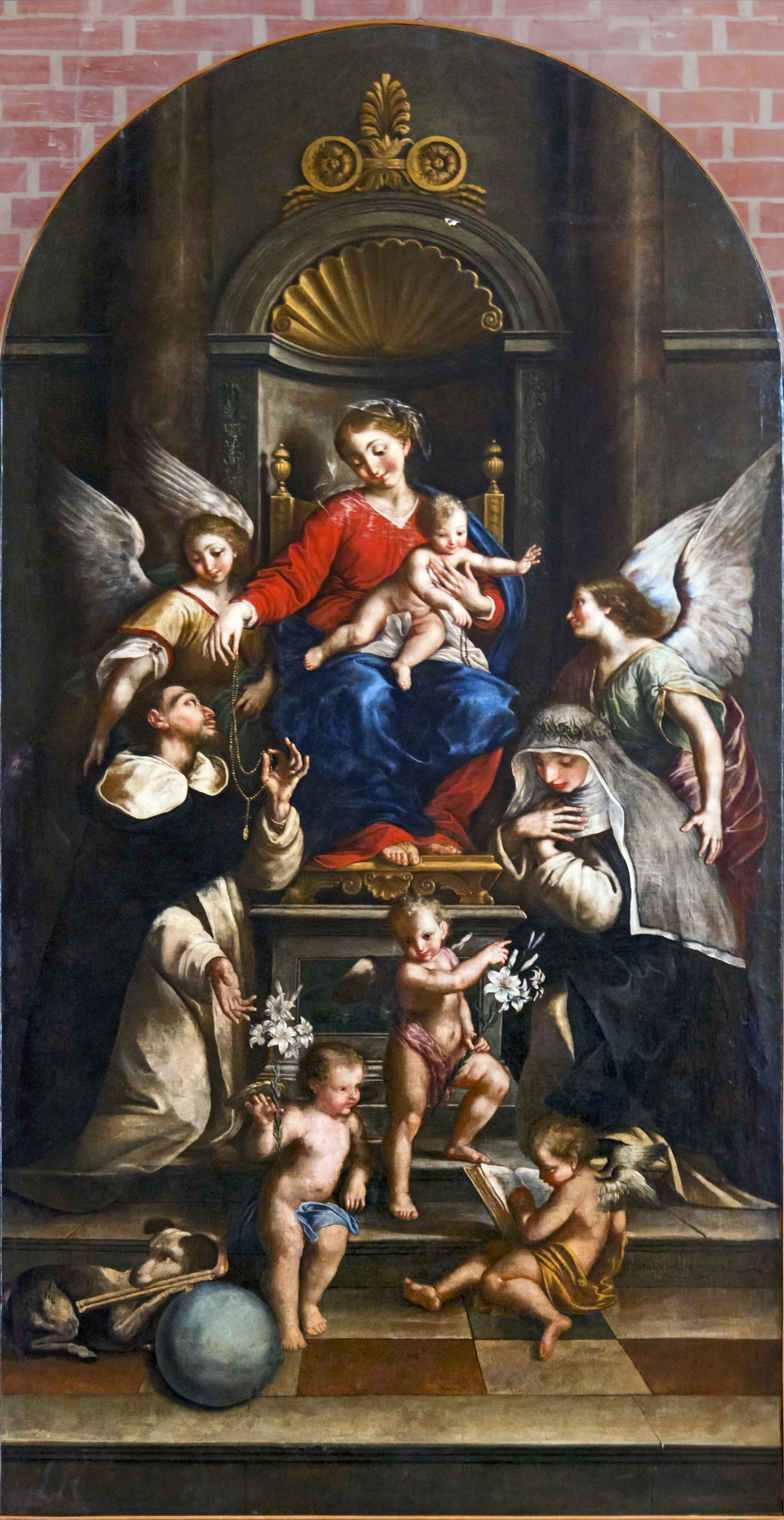
Lorenzo Gramiccia Madonna del Rosario

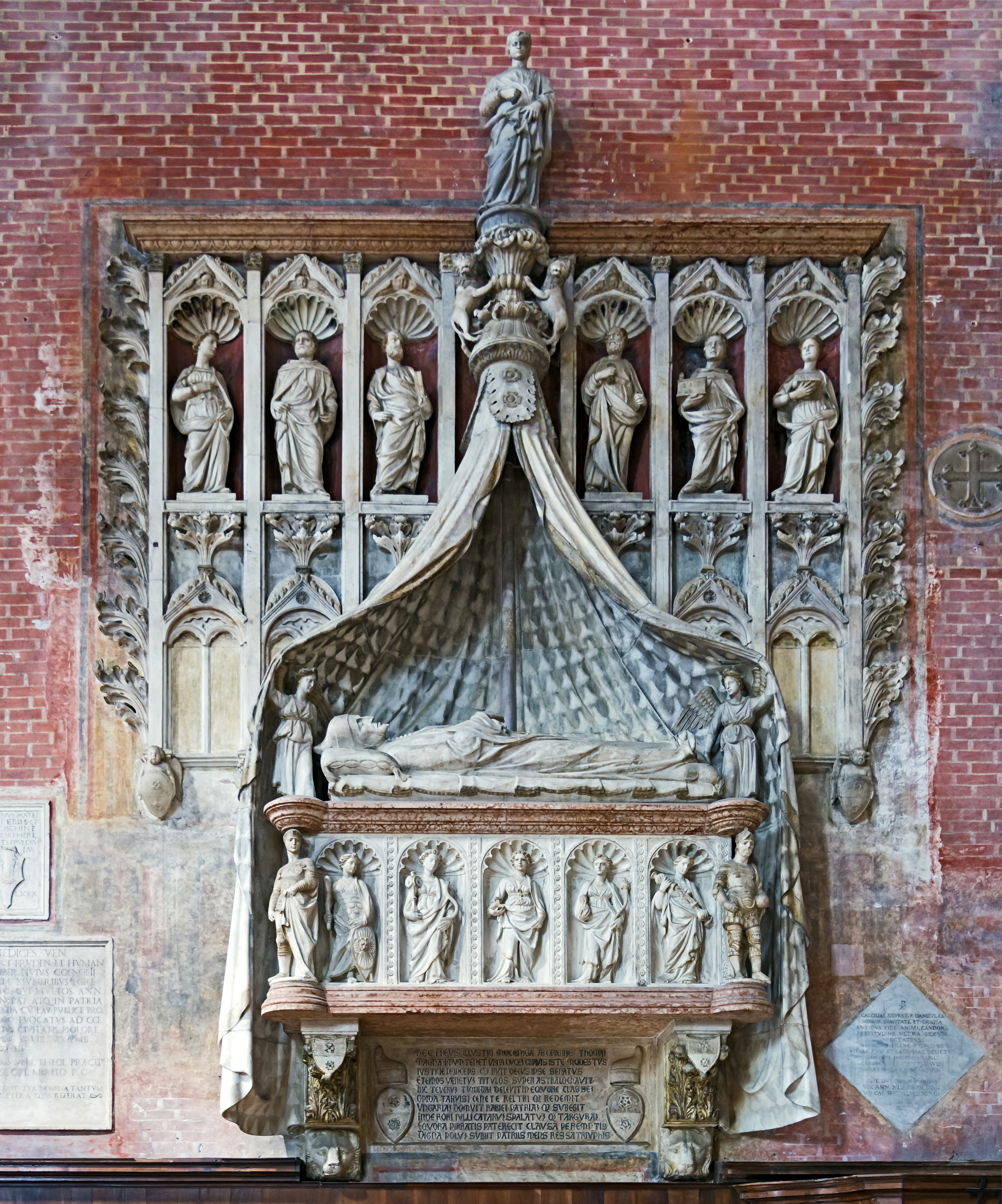
Piero di Niccolò Lamberti Giovanni di Martino tomb of Tommaso Mocenigo

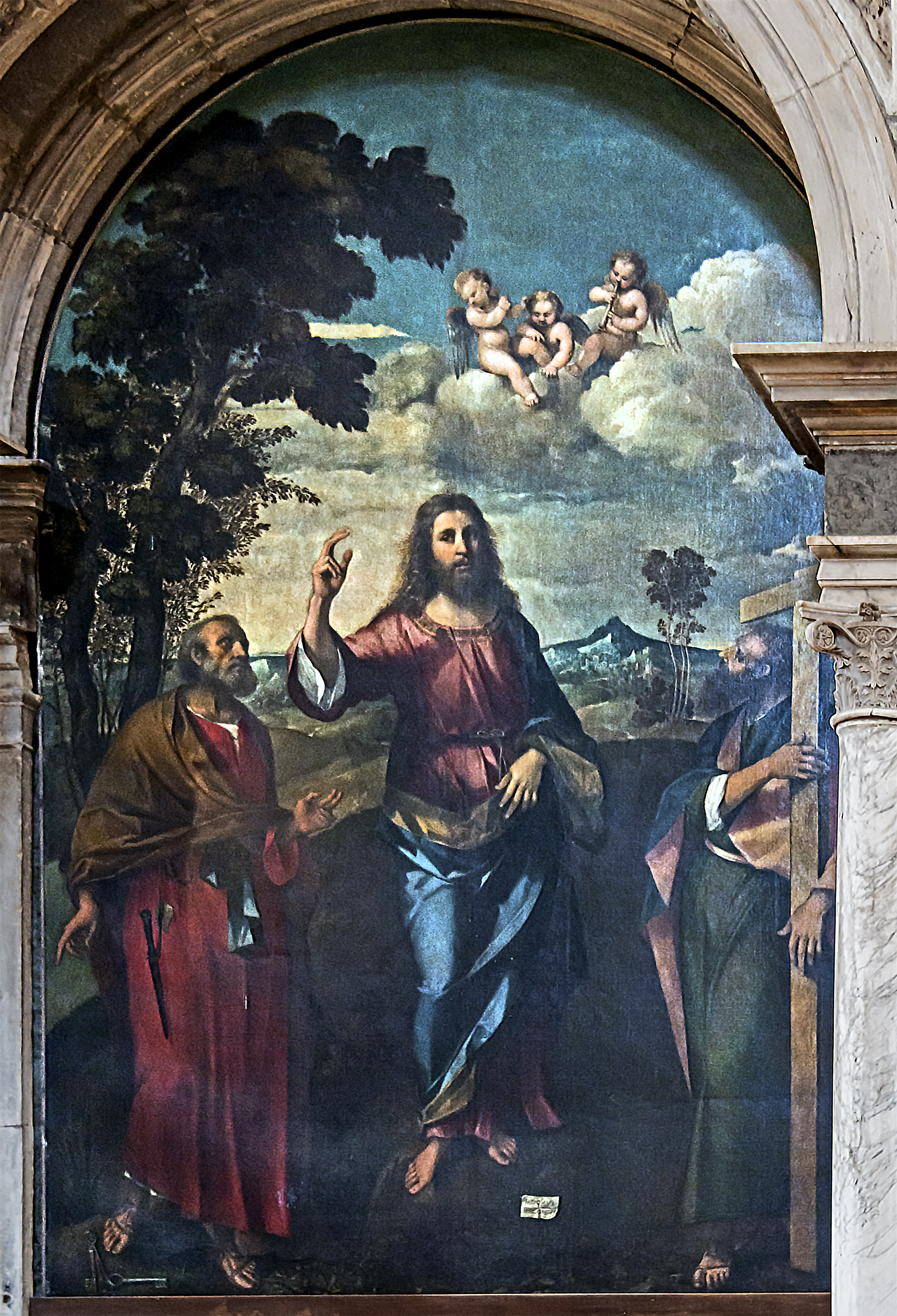
Rocco Marconi Christ between SS Peter and Andrew

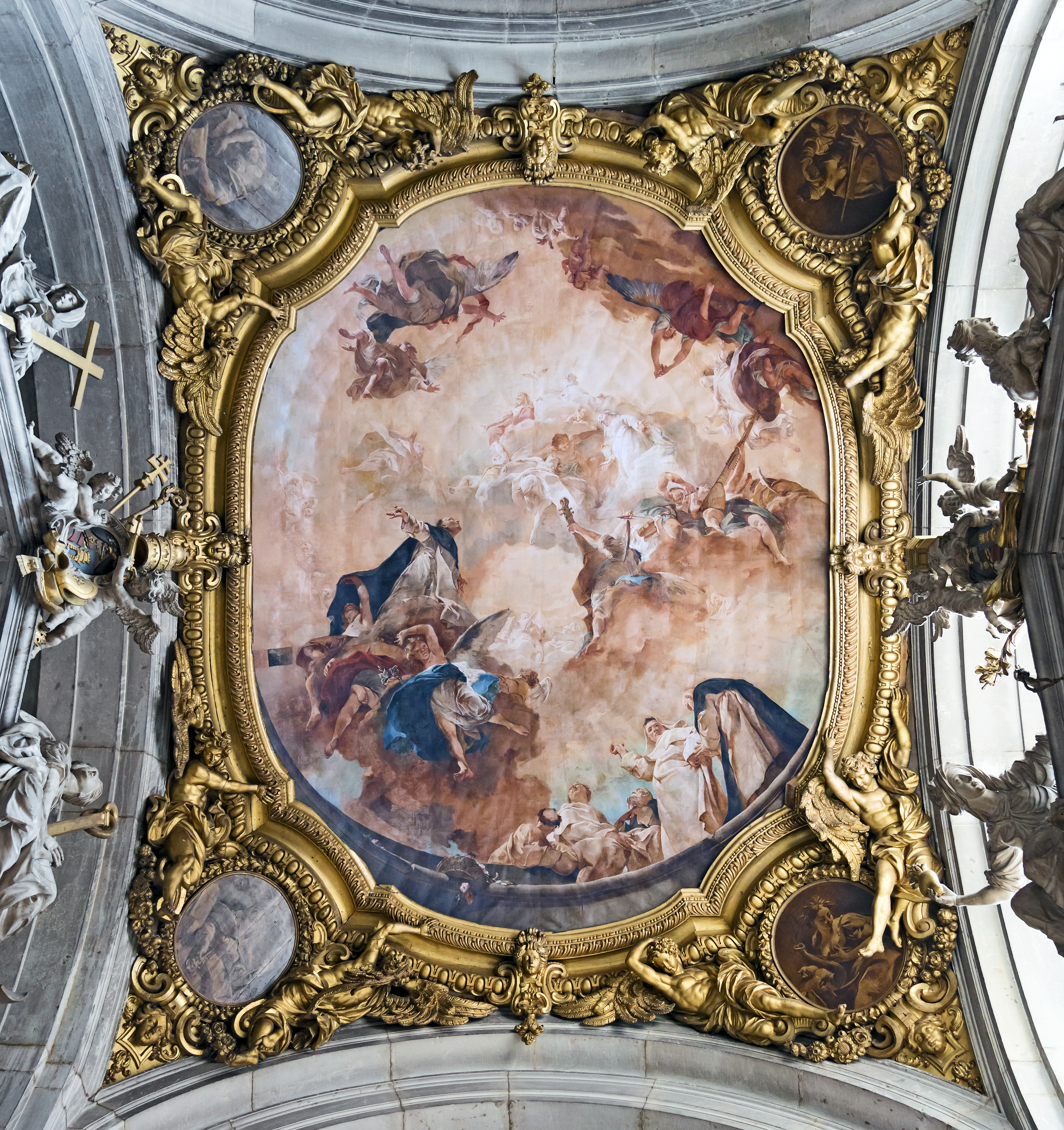
Giovanni Battista Piazzetta St Dominic in Glory
- Veronese (The Assumption, The Annunciation and The Adoration of the Magi on the ceiling of the Capella del Rosario; The Adoration of the Shepherds in the Capella del Rosario). The famous The Feast in the House of Levi, painted for the refectory, is now in the Accademia Gallery.
- Alessandro Vittoria (St Jerome in the north aisle)
- Alvise Vivarini (Christ carrying the Cross in the sacristy)
- Bartolomeo Vivarini (Three Saints in the north aisle)
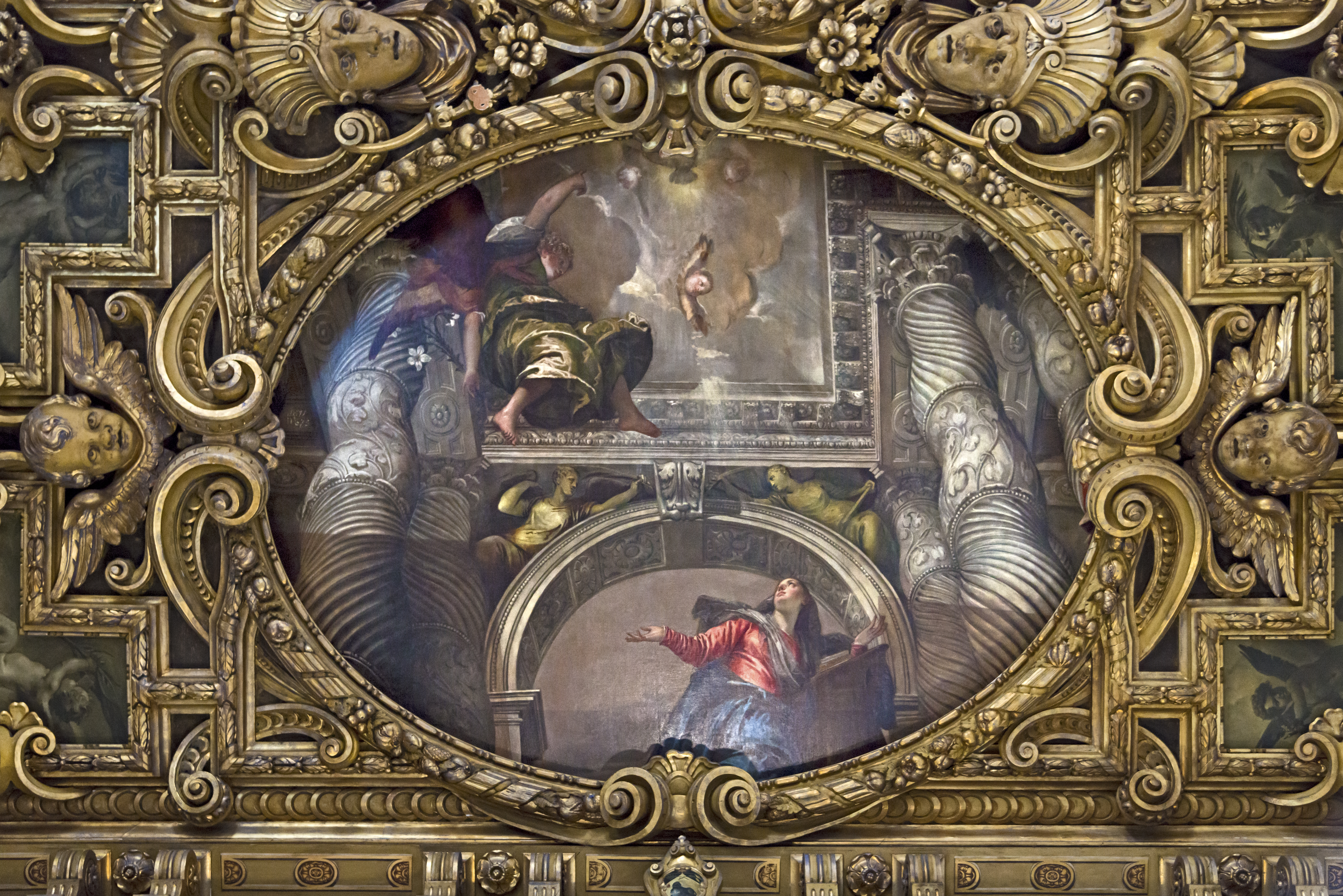
Veronese The Annunciation

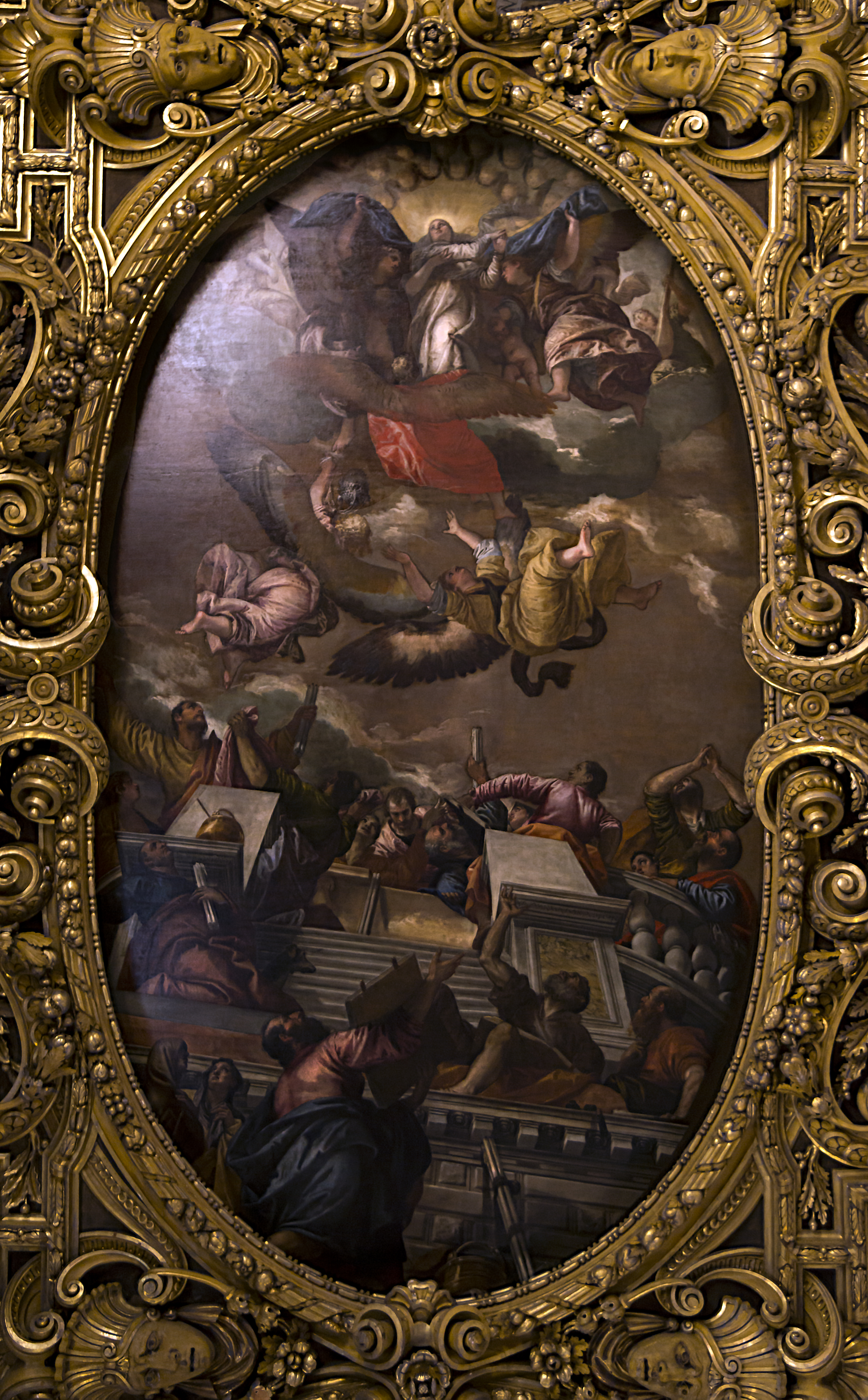
Veronese The Assumption

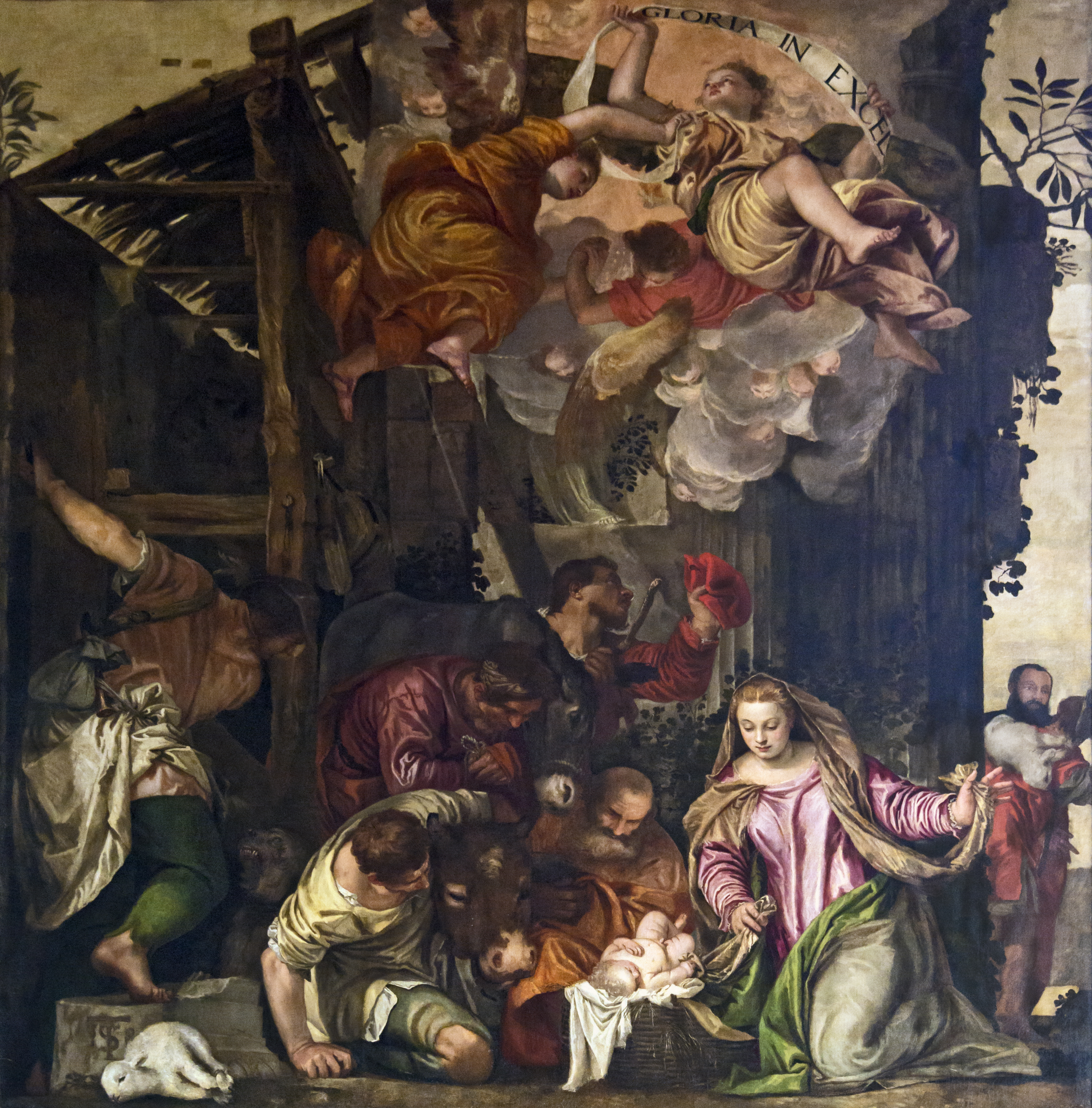
Veronese The Adoration of the Shepherds

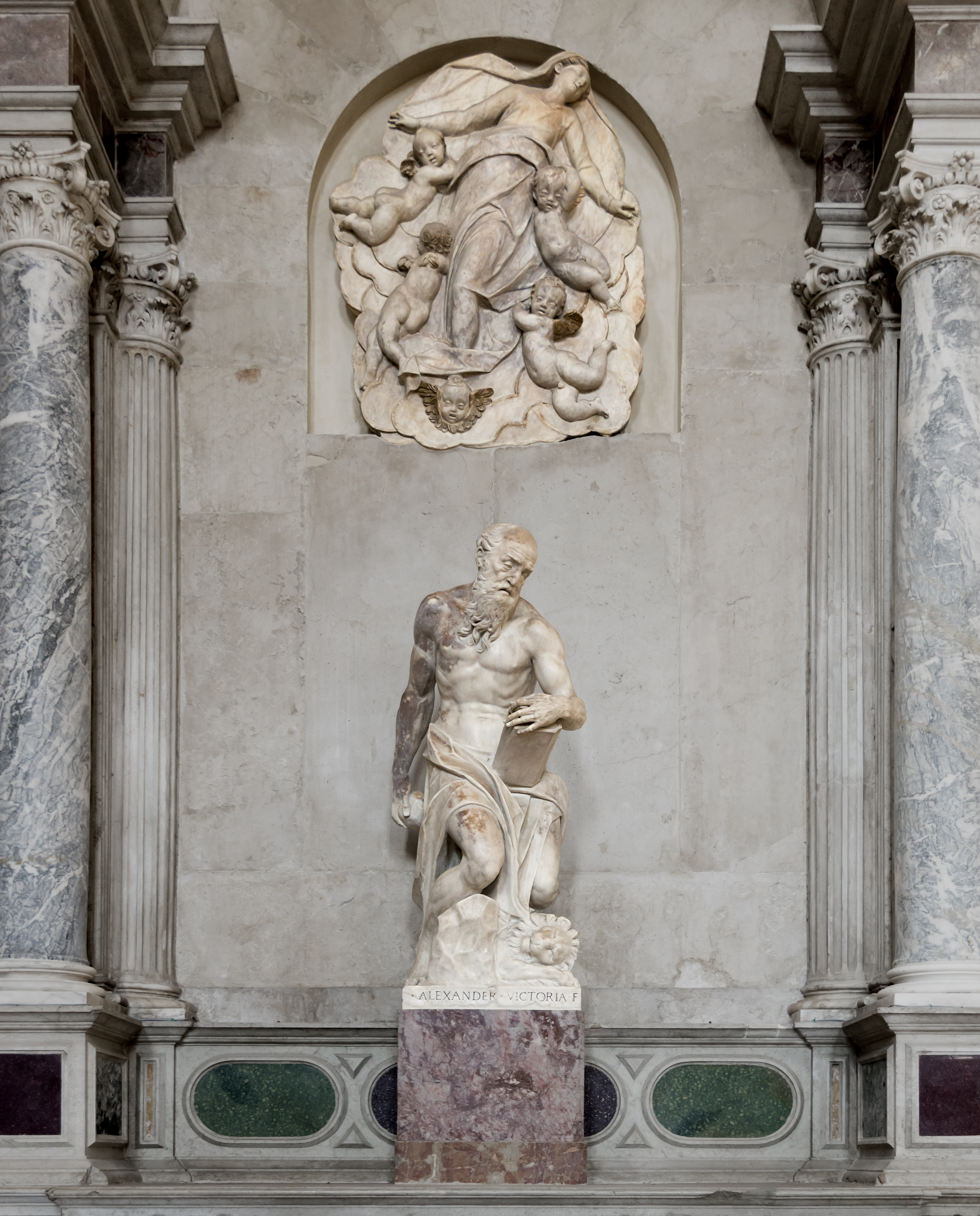
Alessandro Vittoria St Jerome

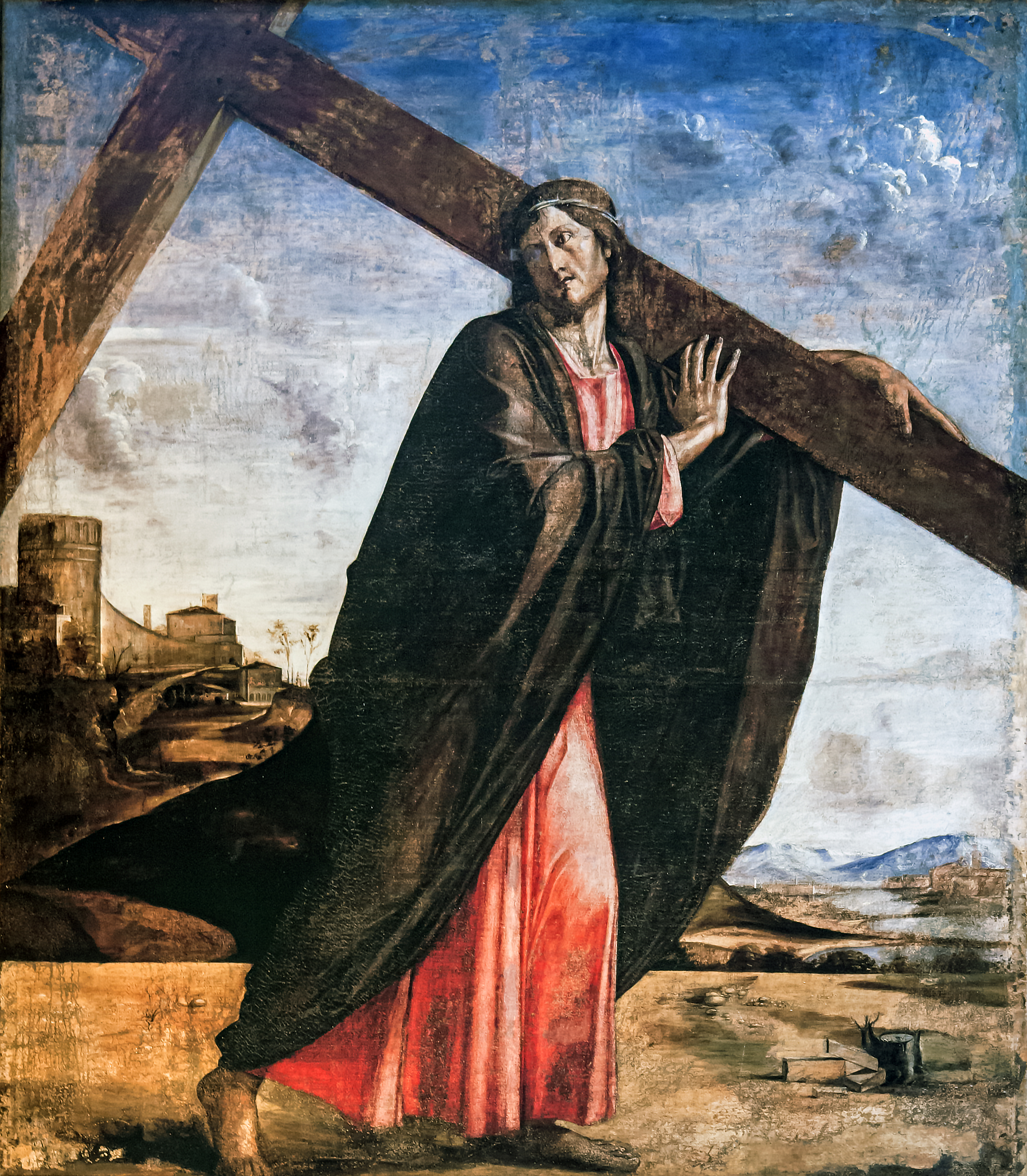
Alvise Vivarini Christ carrying the Cross

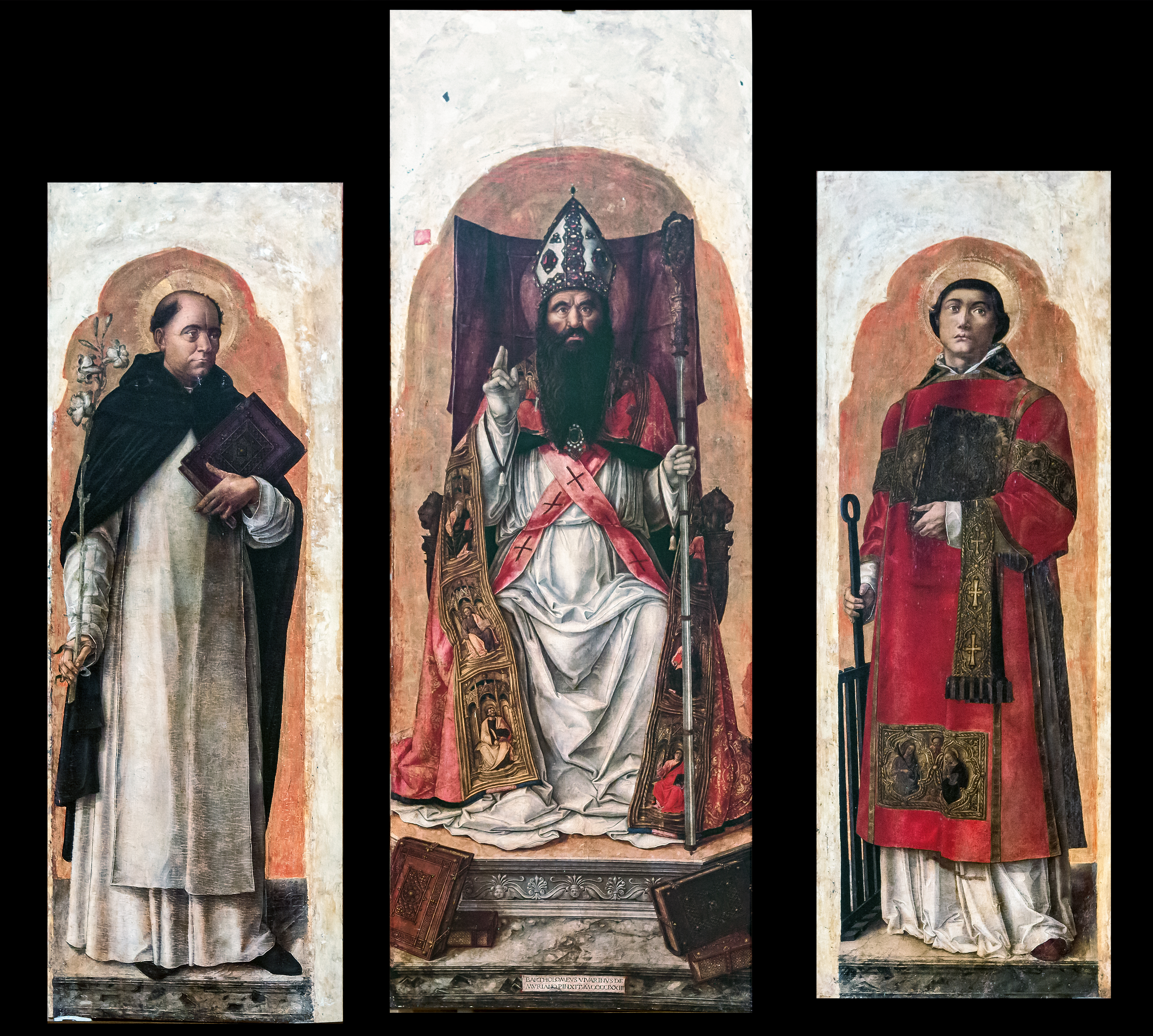
Bartolomeo Vivarini Three Saints

The Capella del Rosario (Chapel of the Rosary)
Built in 1582 to commemorate the victory of Lepanto, contained paintings by Tintoretto, Palma the Younger, Titian (The Assassination of Saint Peter Martyr) and Giovanni Bellini, among others, but they were destroyed in a fire in 1867 attributed to anti-Catholic arsonists.

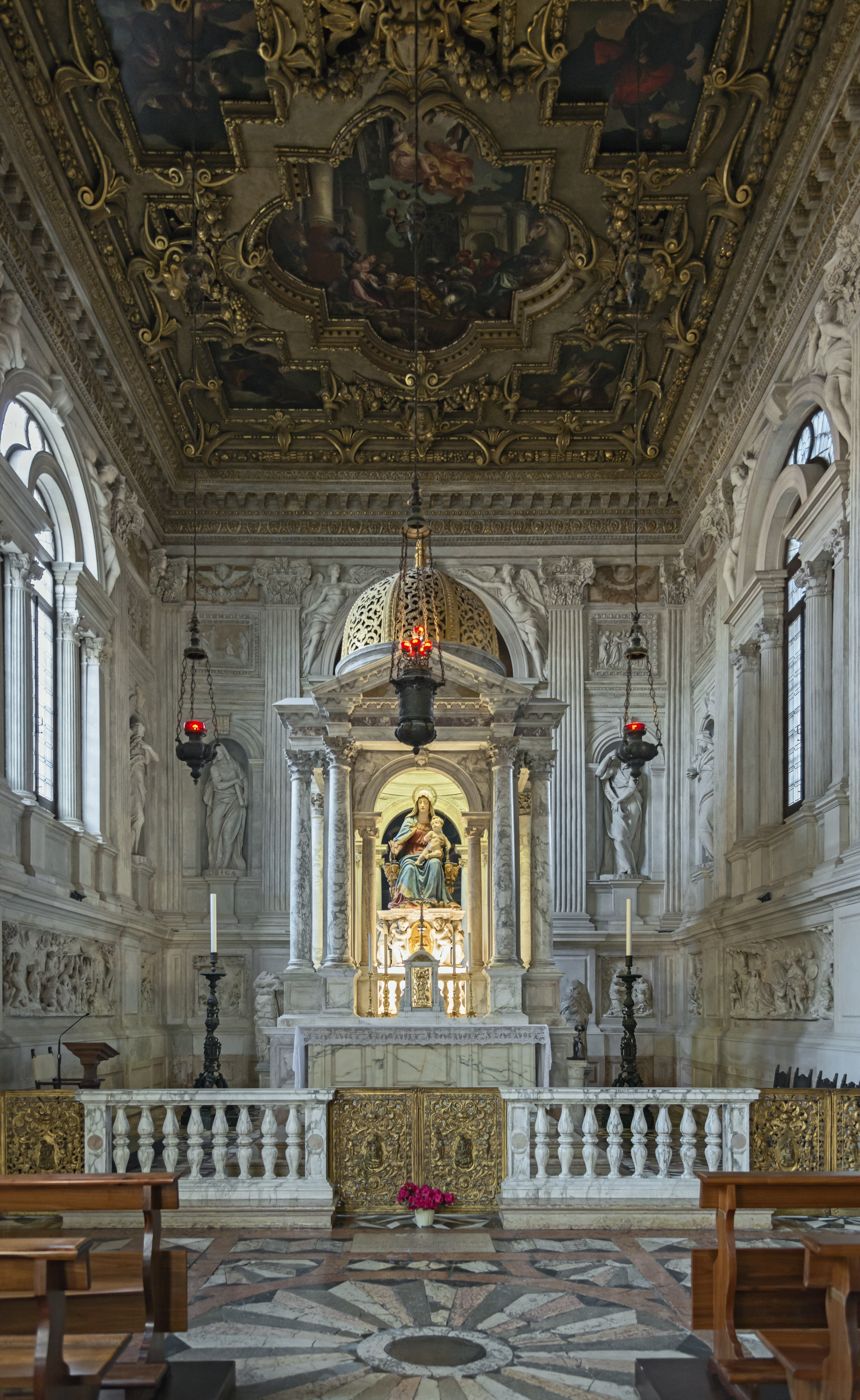
Chapel of the Rosary

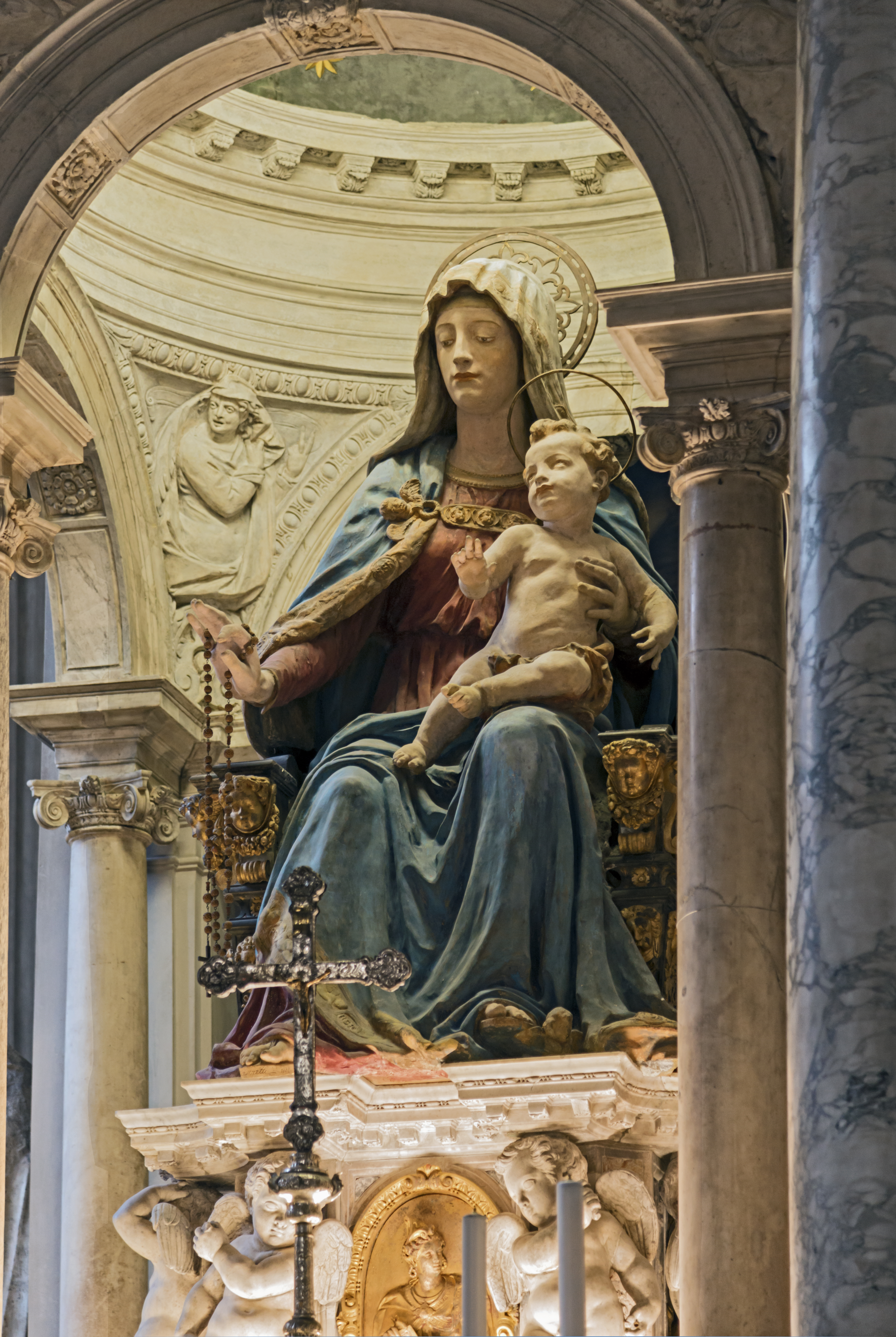
Lady of the Rosary Giovanni Dureghello

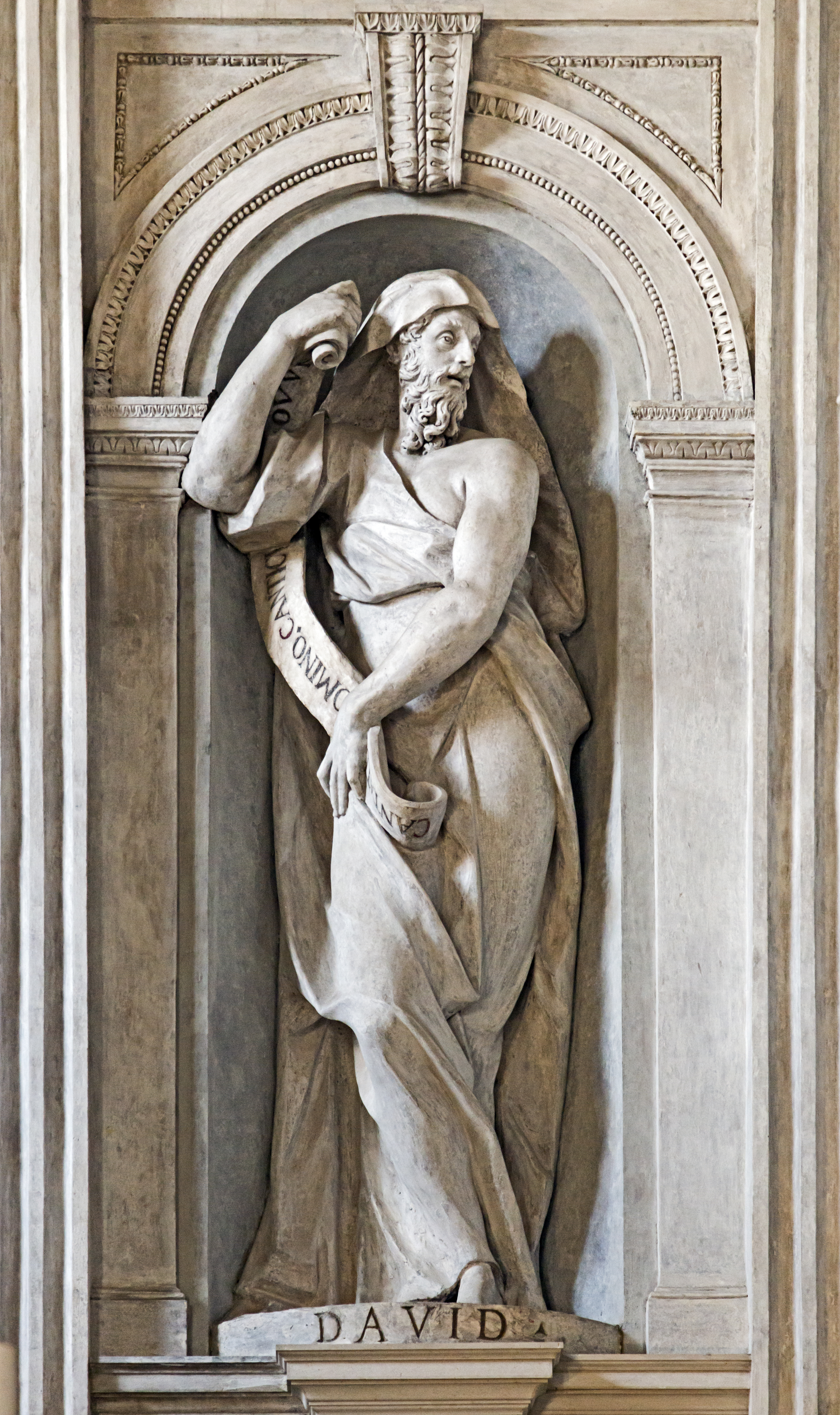
David by Alessandro Vittoria

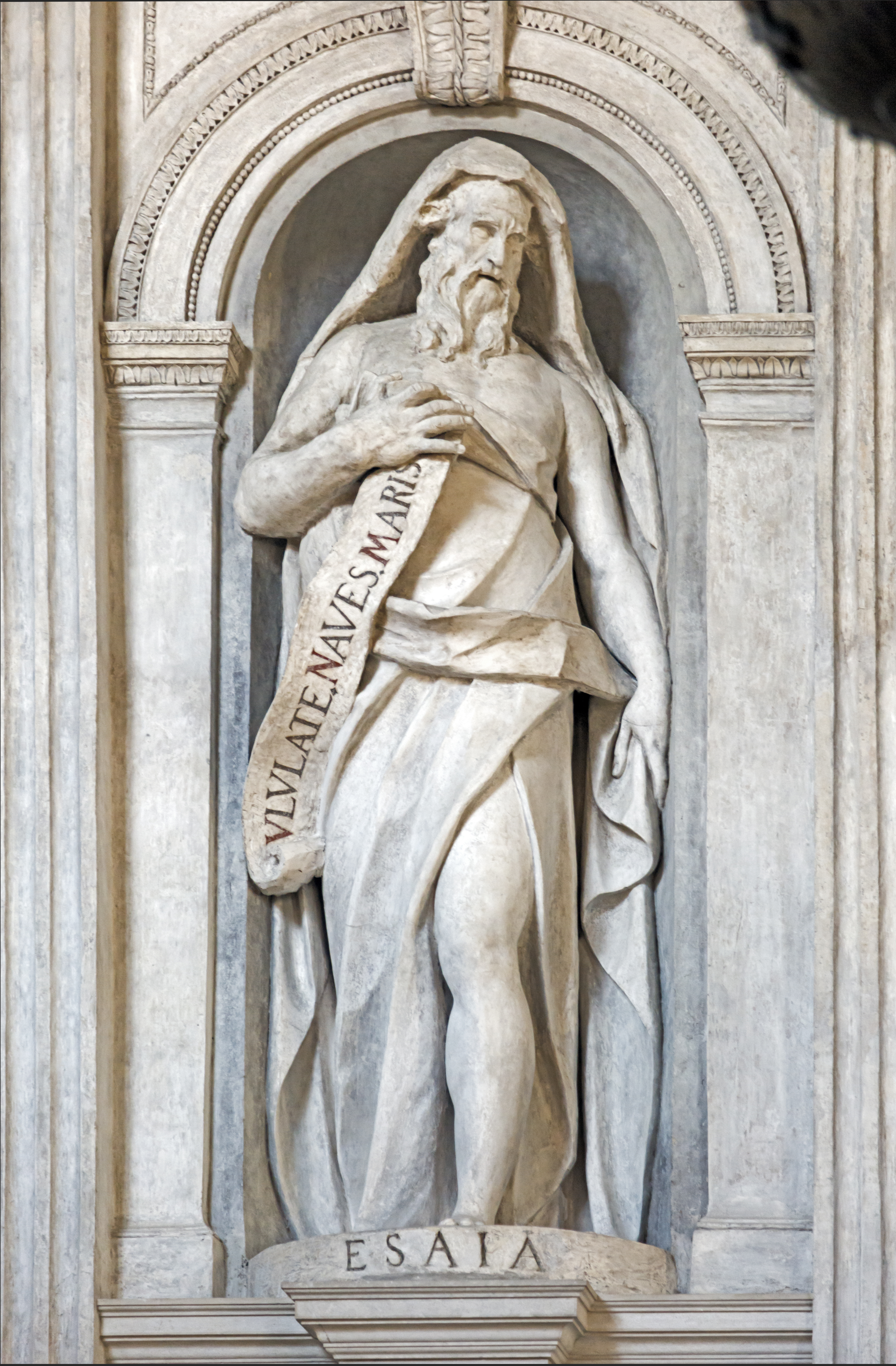
Isaiah by Alessandro Vittoria

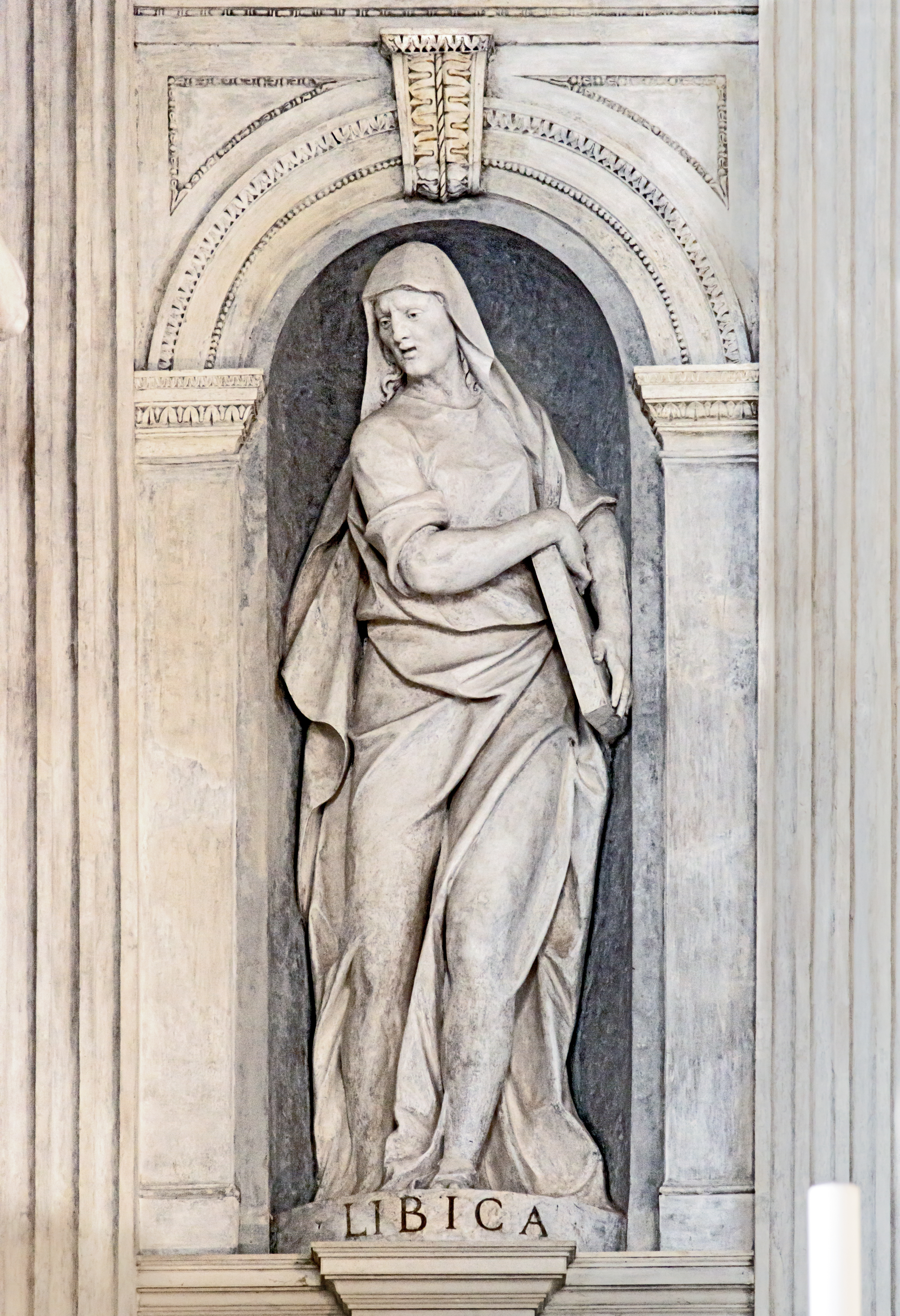
Libyan Sibyl by Alessandro Vittoria

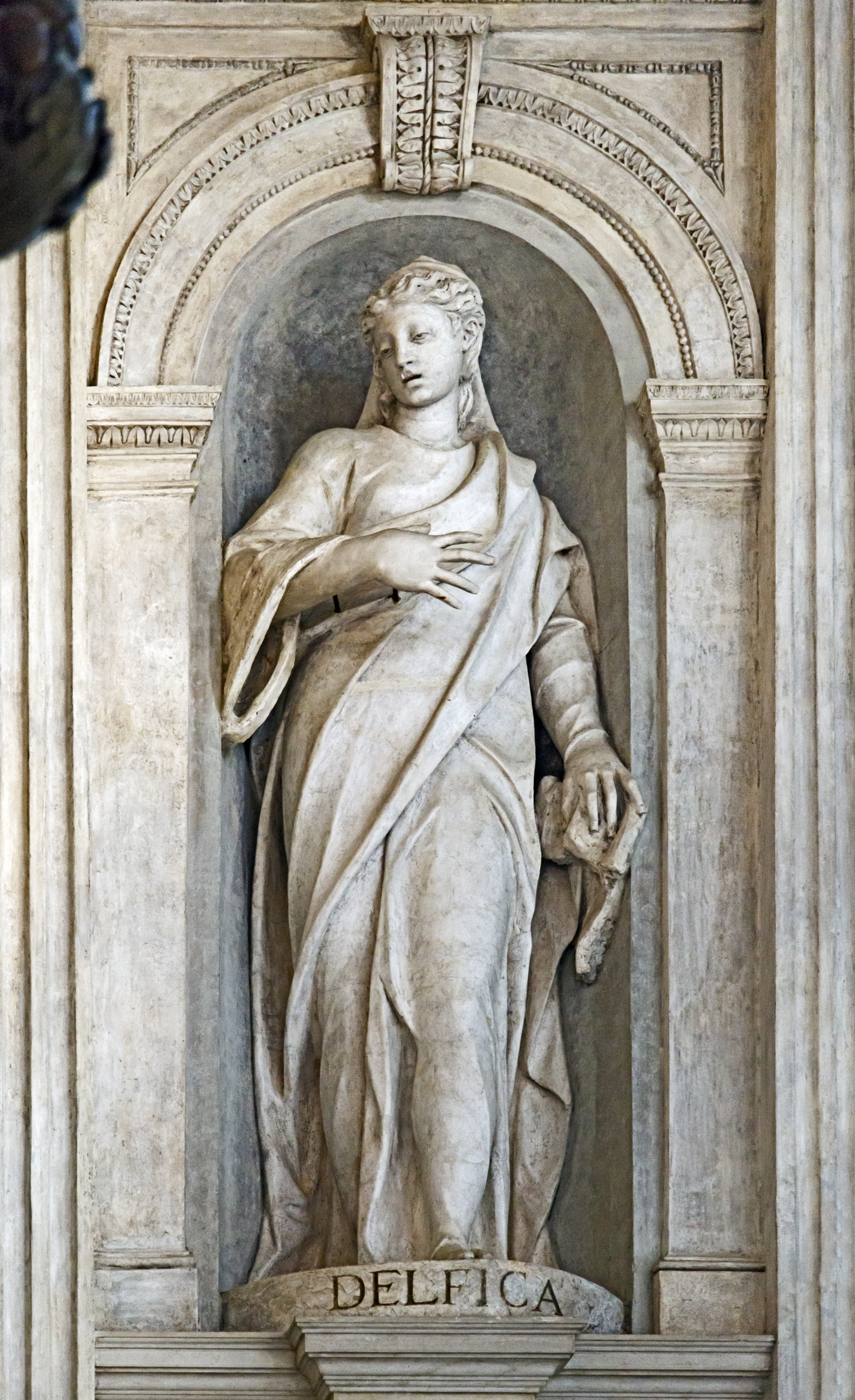
Delphic Sibyl by Alessandro Vittoria

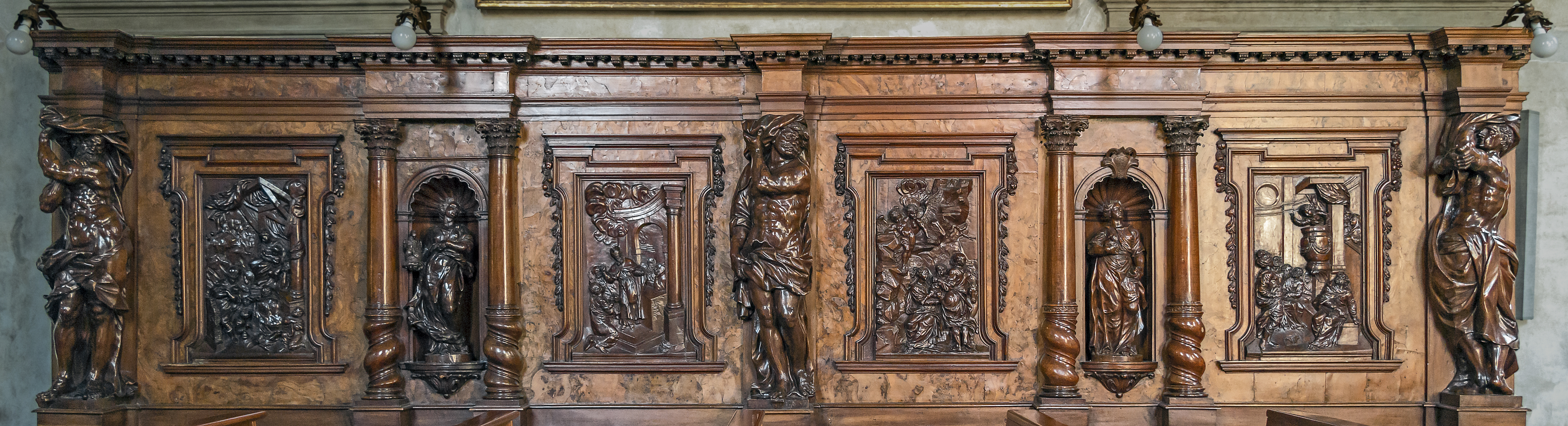
Siding wooden altar by Giacomo Piazzetta

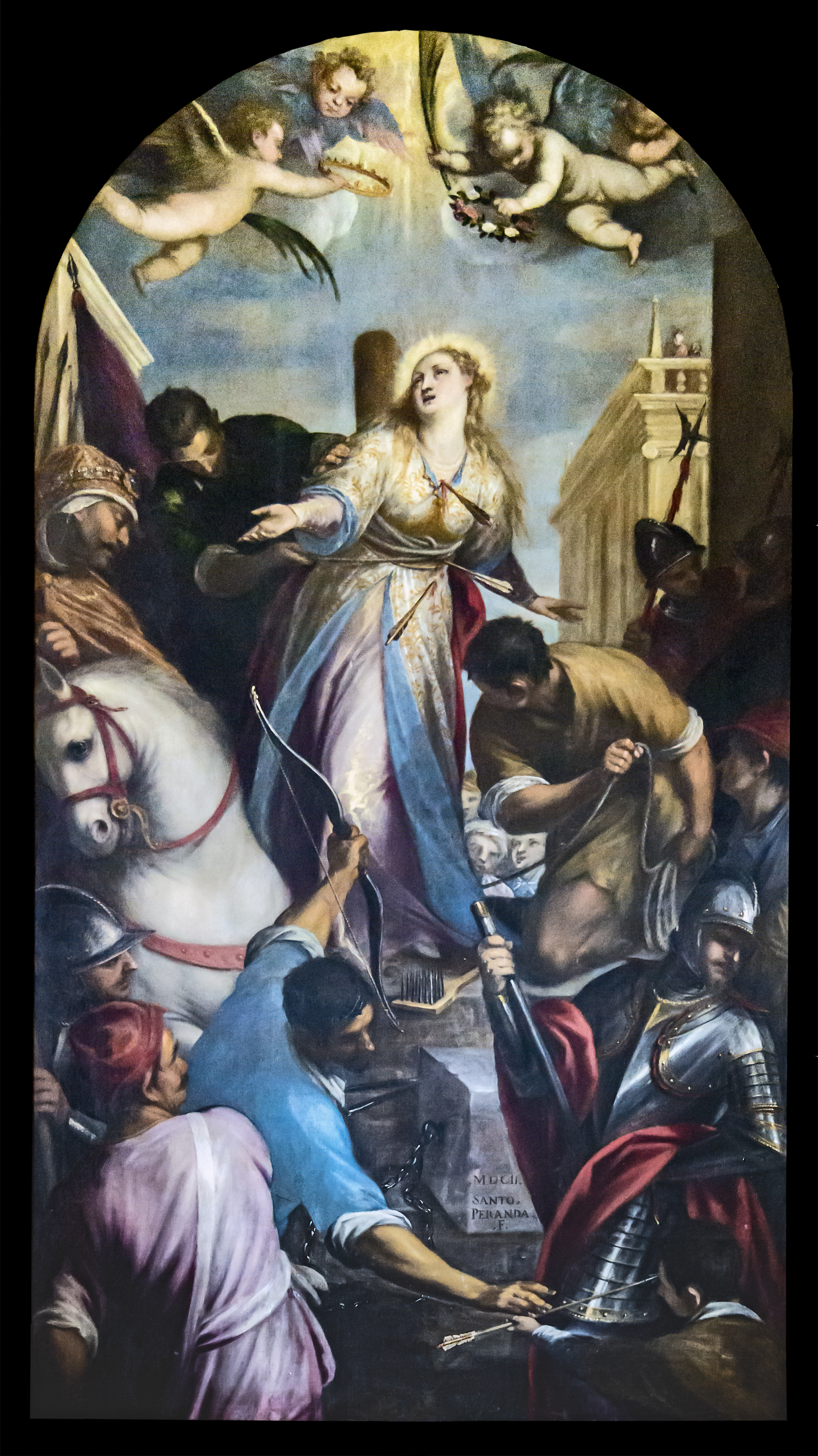
Martyrdom of St Christina by Sante Peranda

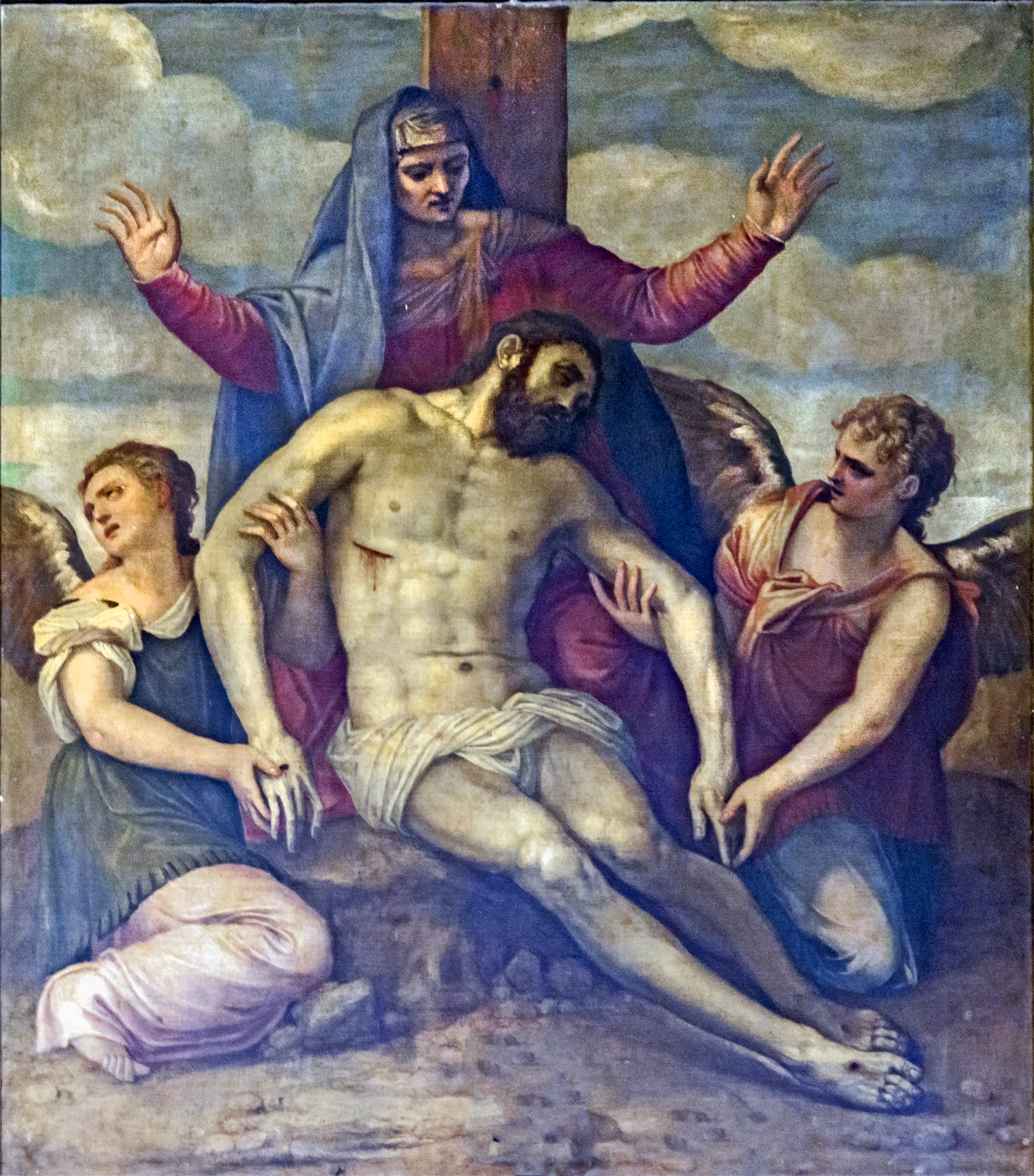
Dead Christ Giovanni Battista Zelotti

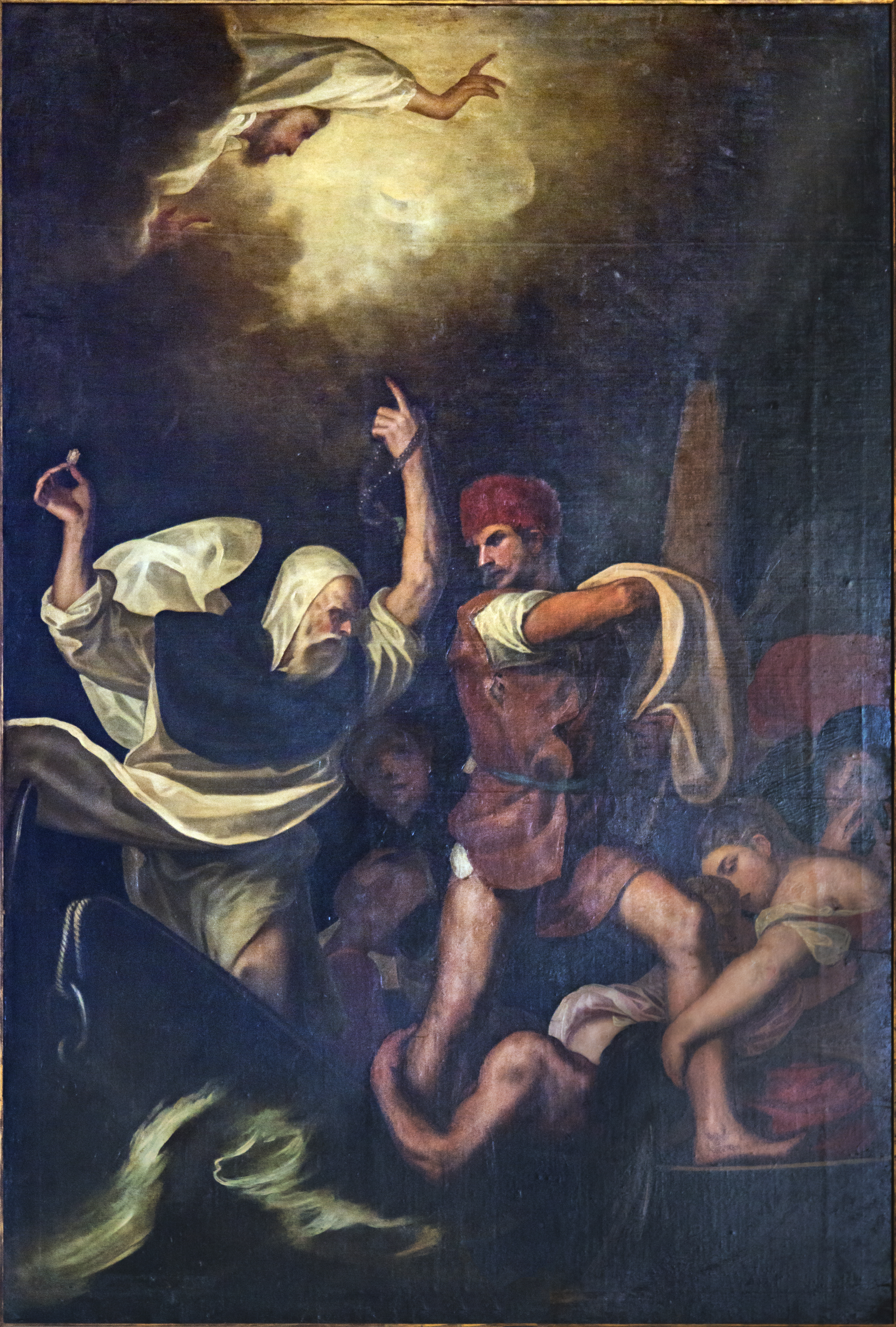
Miracle of St Dominic Alessandro Varotari

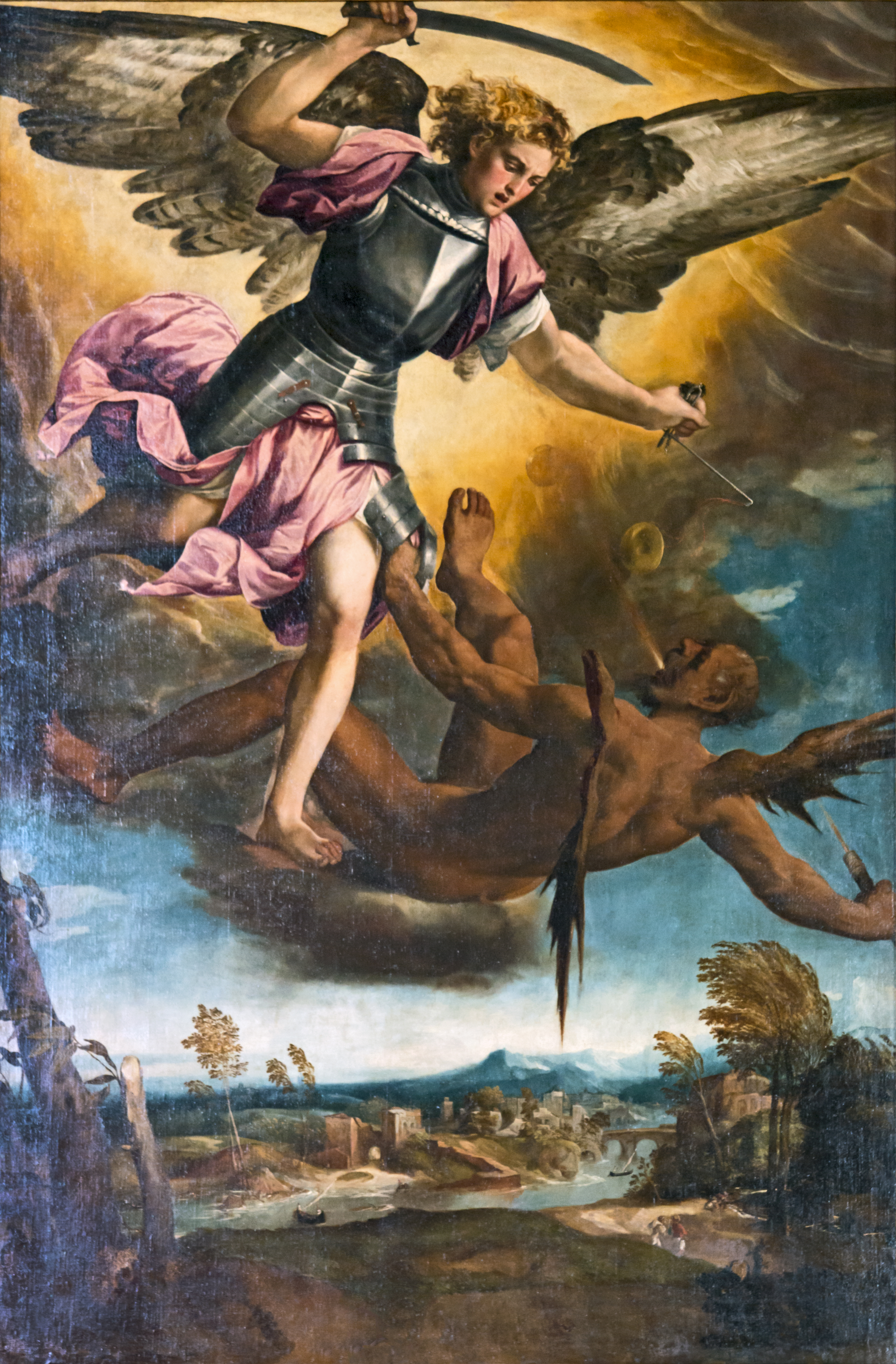
St Michael Vanquishing the Devil Bonifacio de' Pitati

== Funerary monuments ==
After the 15th century the funeral services of all of Venice's doges were held in Santi Giovanni e Paolo. Twenty-five doges are buried in the church, including:

- Marino Zorzi (d. 1312) and his wife Agnese (d. 1320), unknown location
- Jacopo Tiepolo (d. 1249)
- Marino Morosini (d. 1253)
- Reniero Zeno (d. 1268)
- Lorenzo Tiepolo (d. 1275)
- Giovanni Dolfin (d. 1361)
- Marco Cornaro (d. 1368)
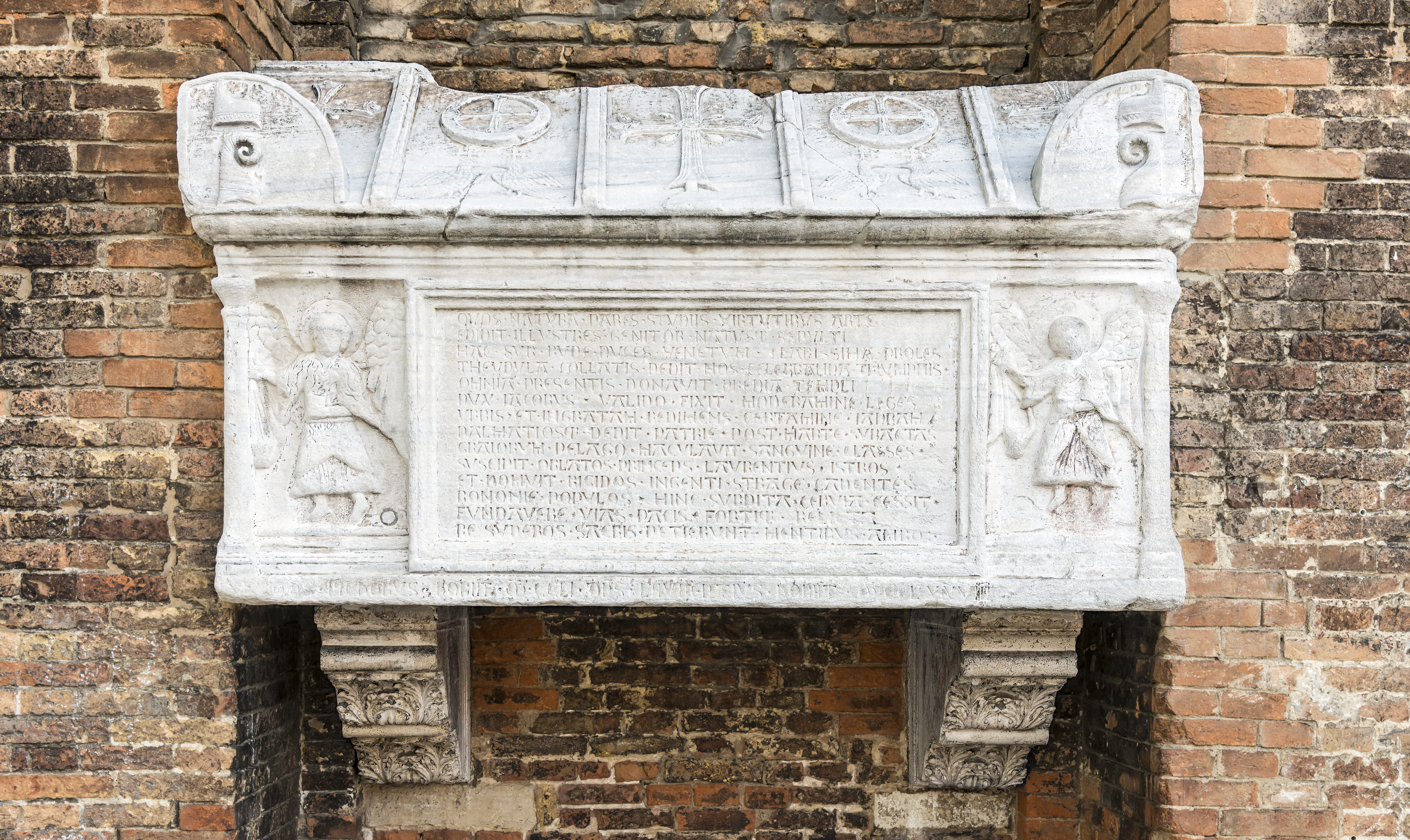
Tomb of Jacopo e Lorenzo Tiepolo

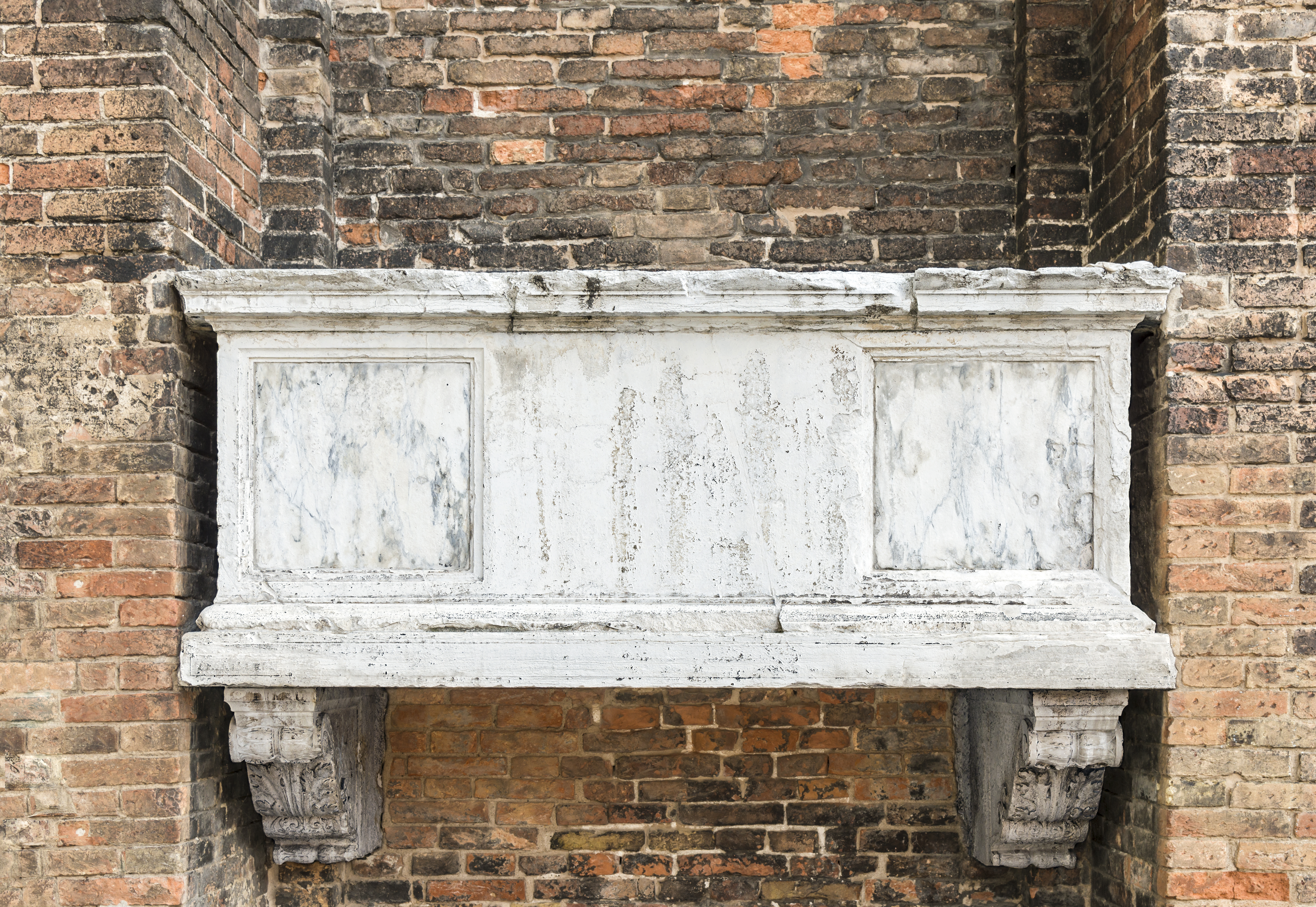
Tomb of Marino Morosini

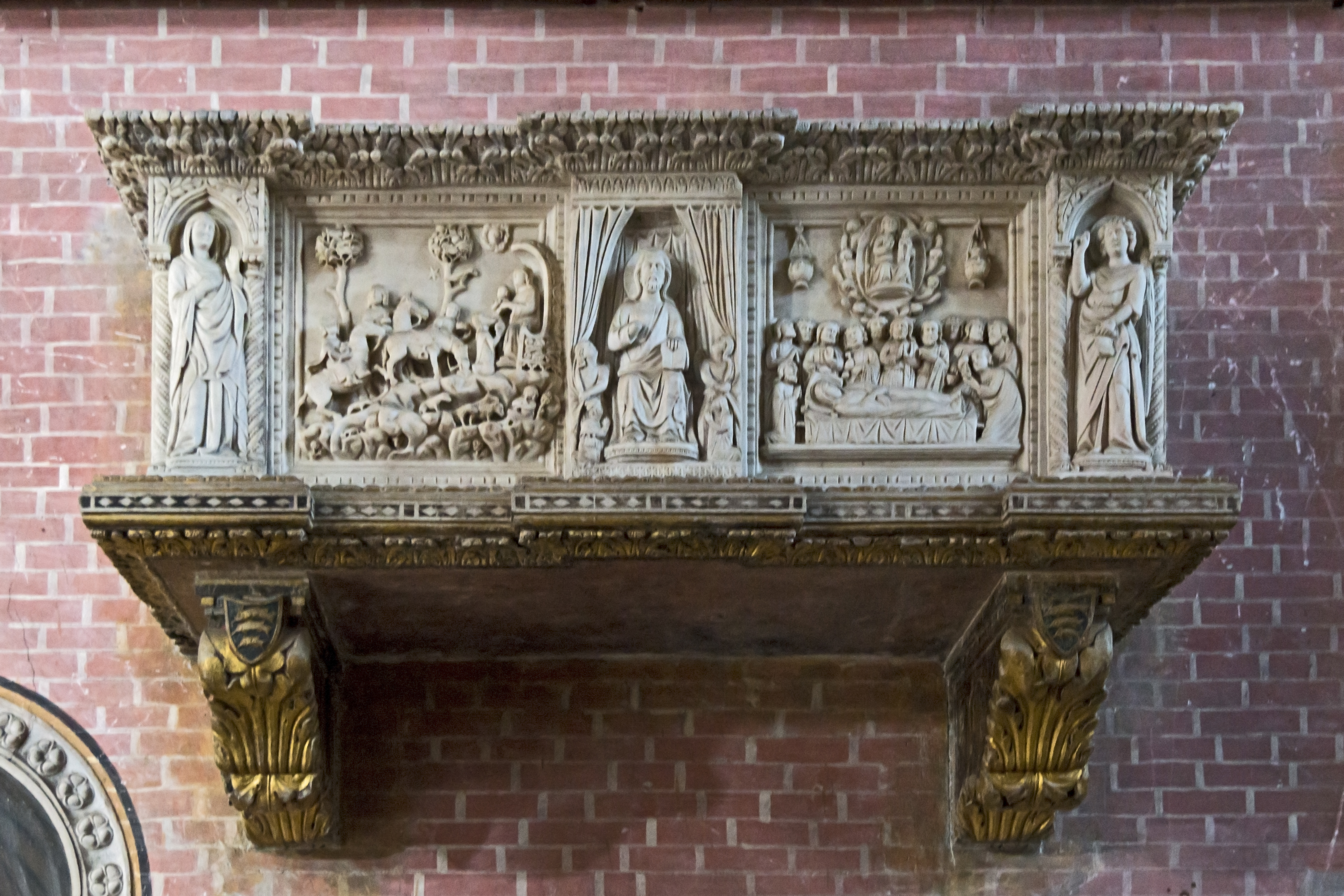
Monument Giovanni Dolfin

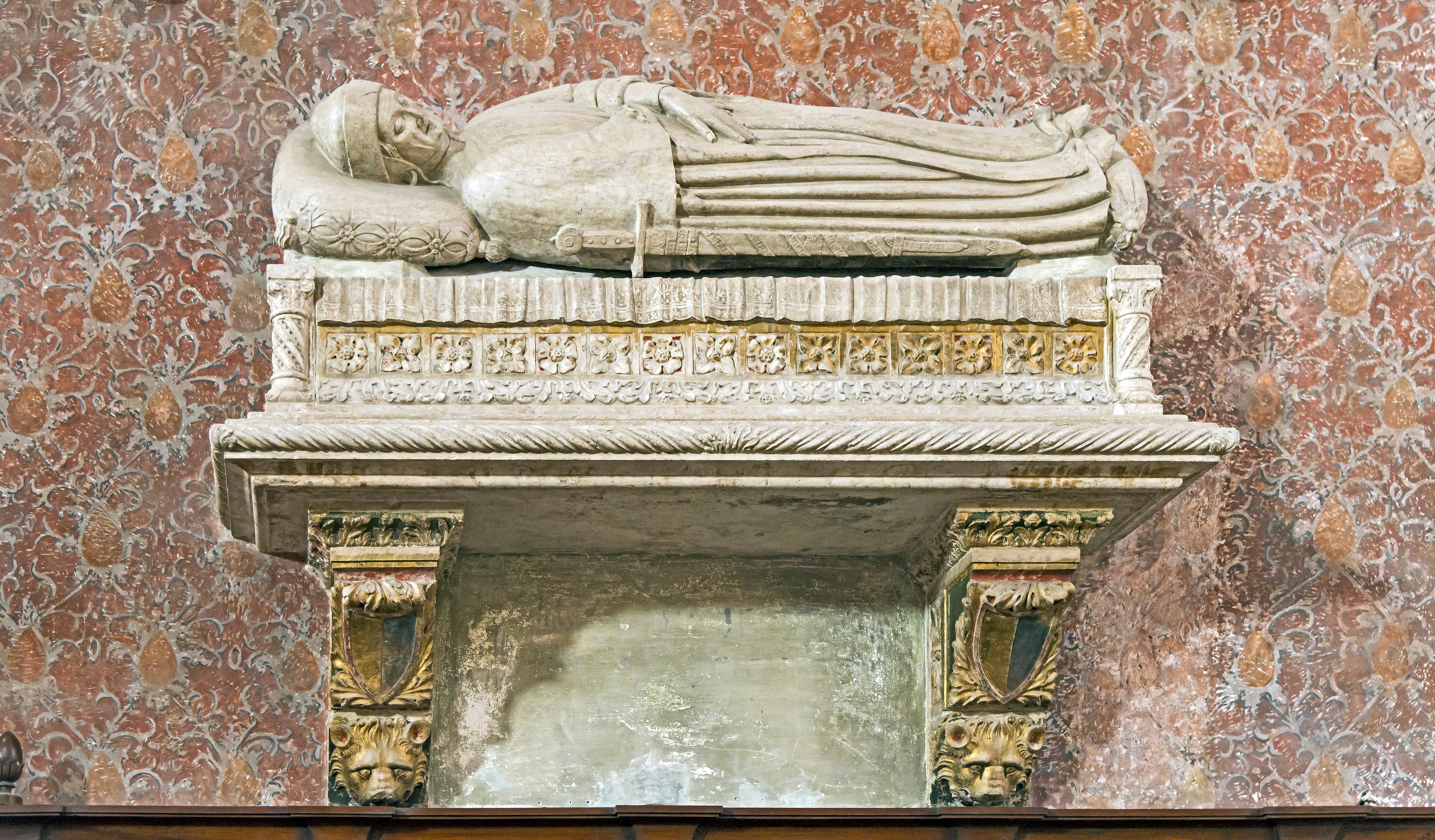
Tomb to Marco Corner
- Michele Morosini (d. 1382)
- Antonio Venier (d. 1400)
- Michele Steno (d. 1413)
- Tommaso Mocenigo (d. 1423)
- Pasquale Malipiero (d. 1462)
- Nicolo Marcello (d. 1474)
- Pietro Mocenigo (d. 1476)
- Andrea Vendramin (d. 1478)
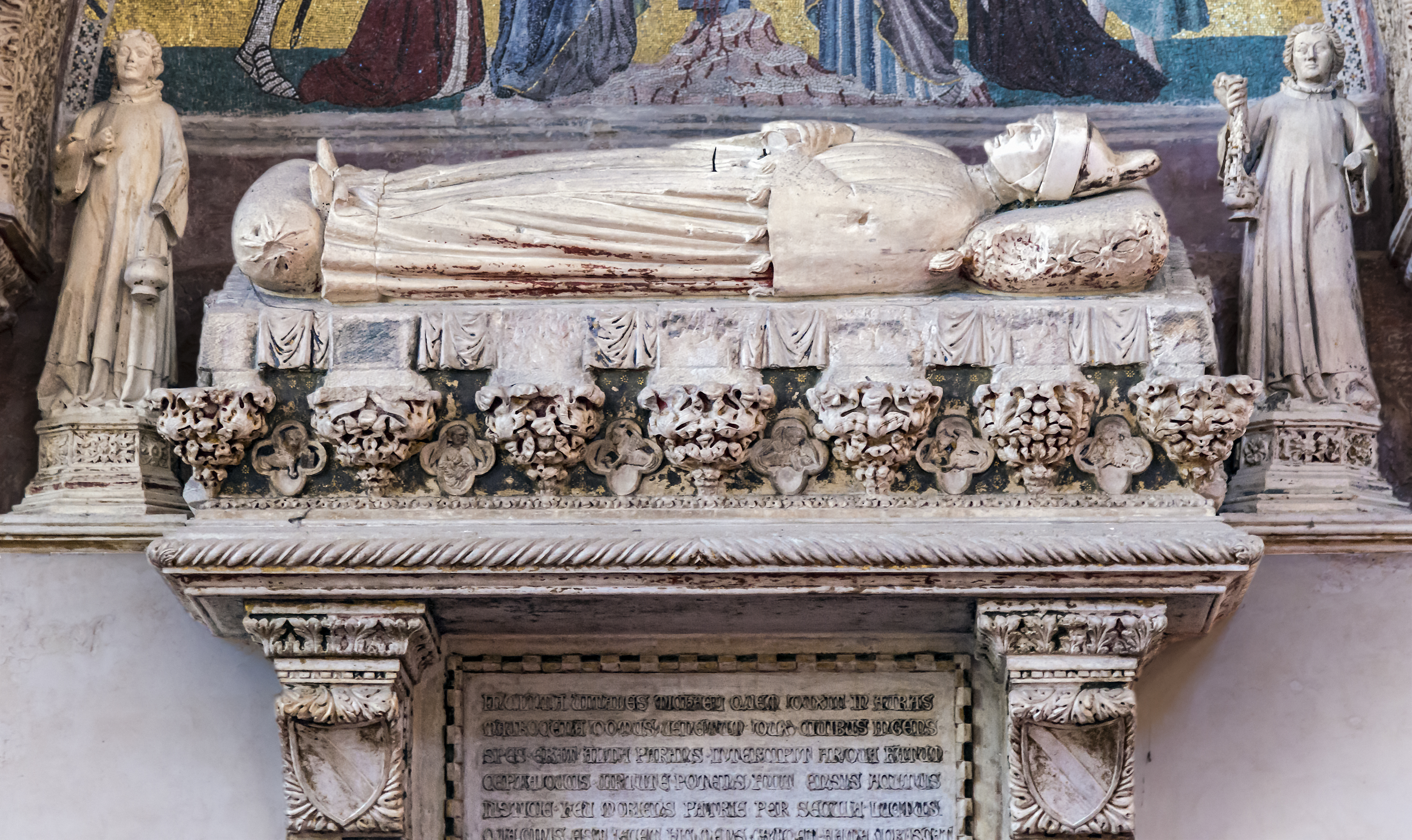
Monument to Michele Morosini

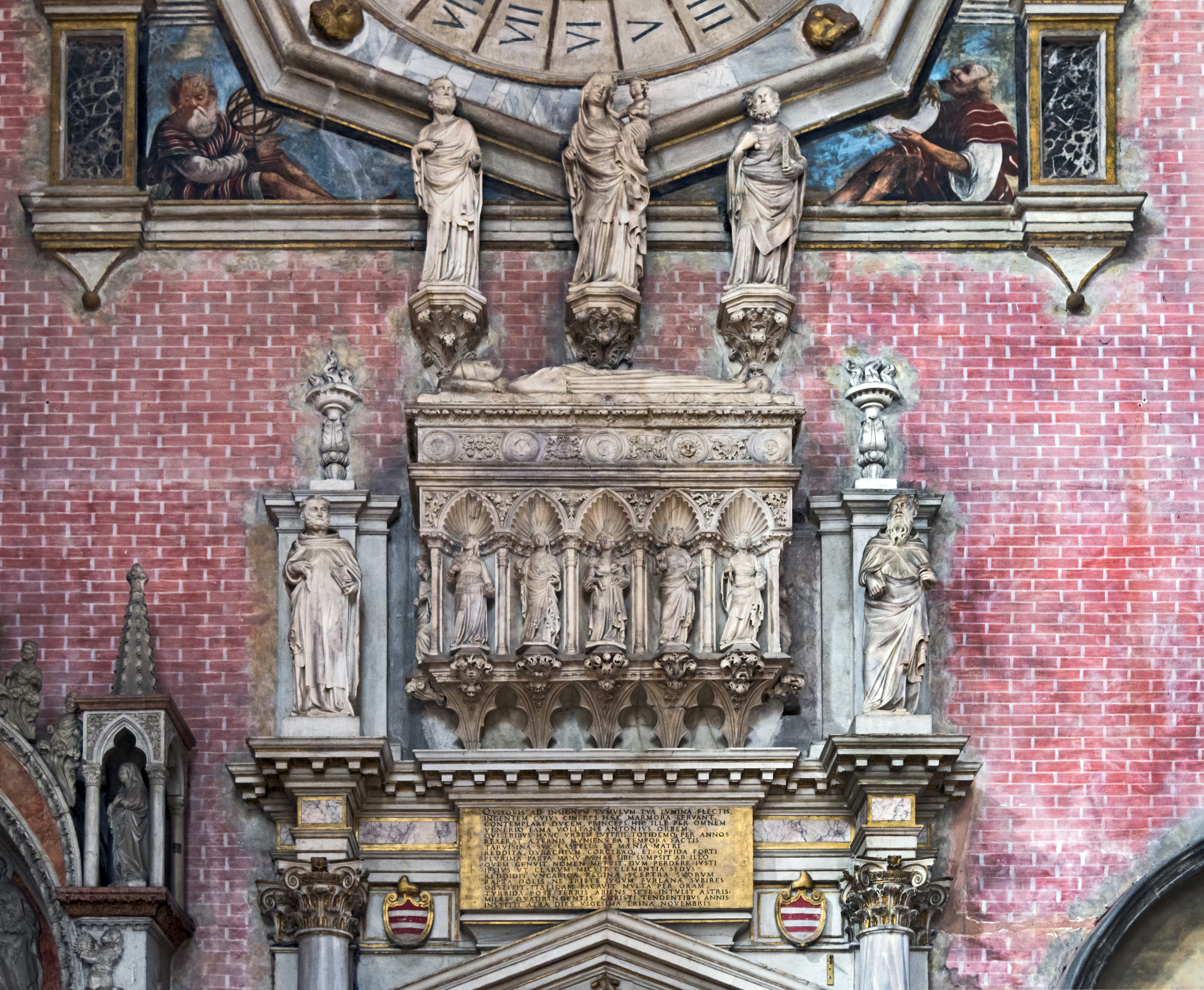
Tomb of Antonio Venier

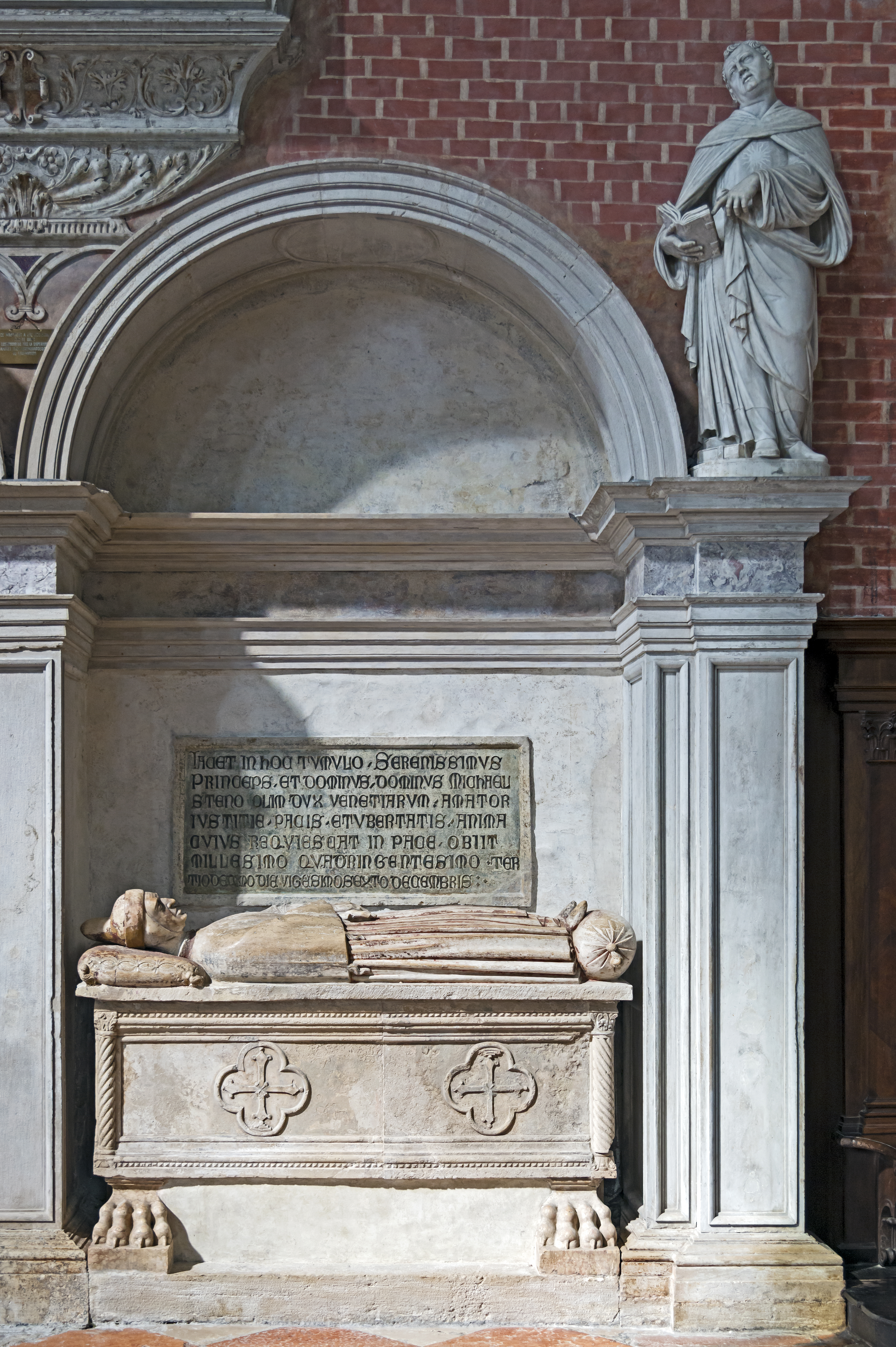
Monument to Michele Steno

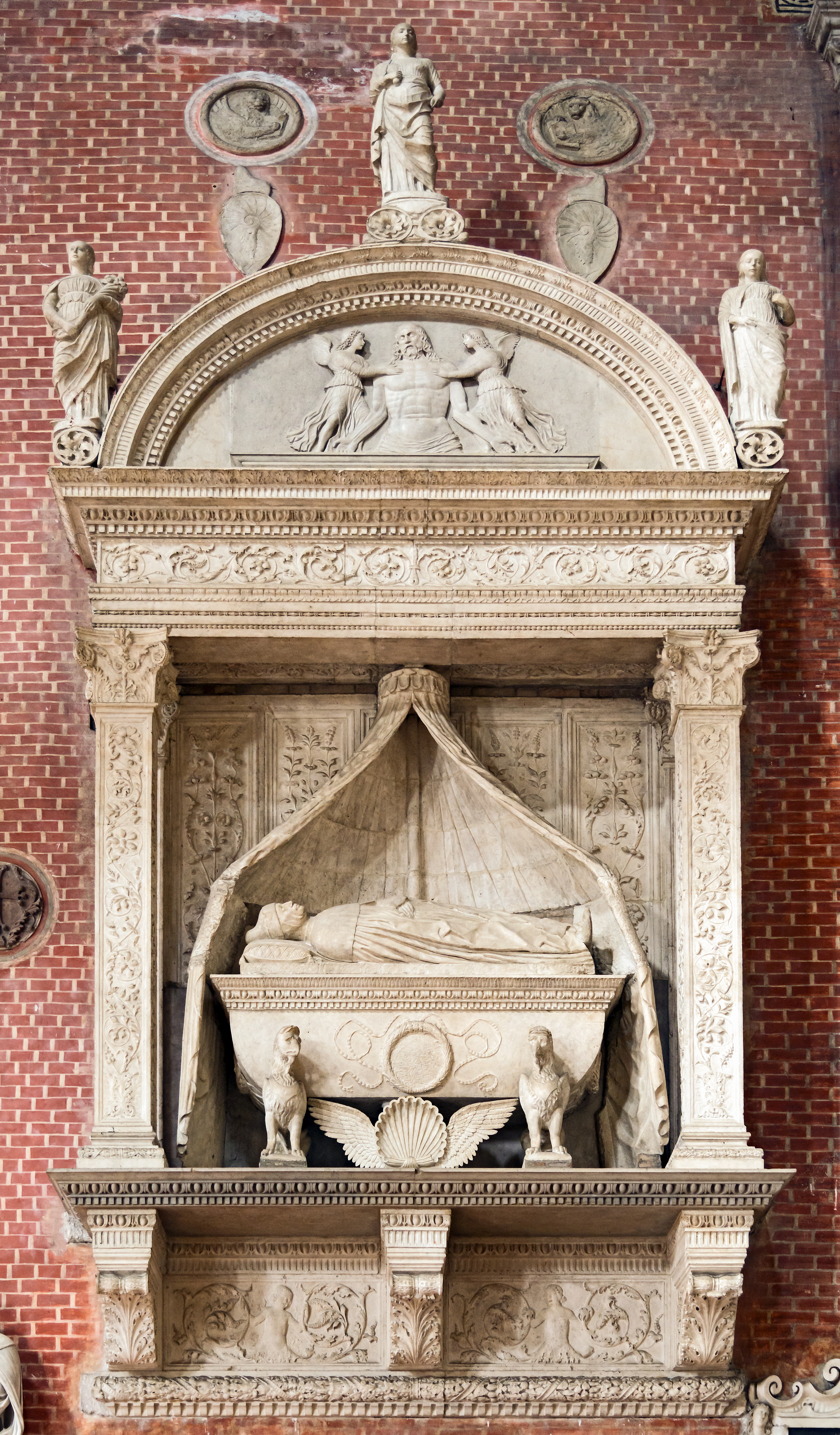
Monument to Pasquale Malipiero

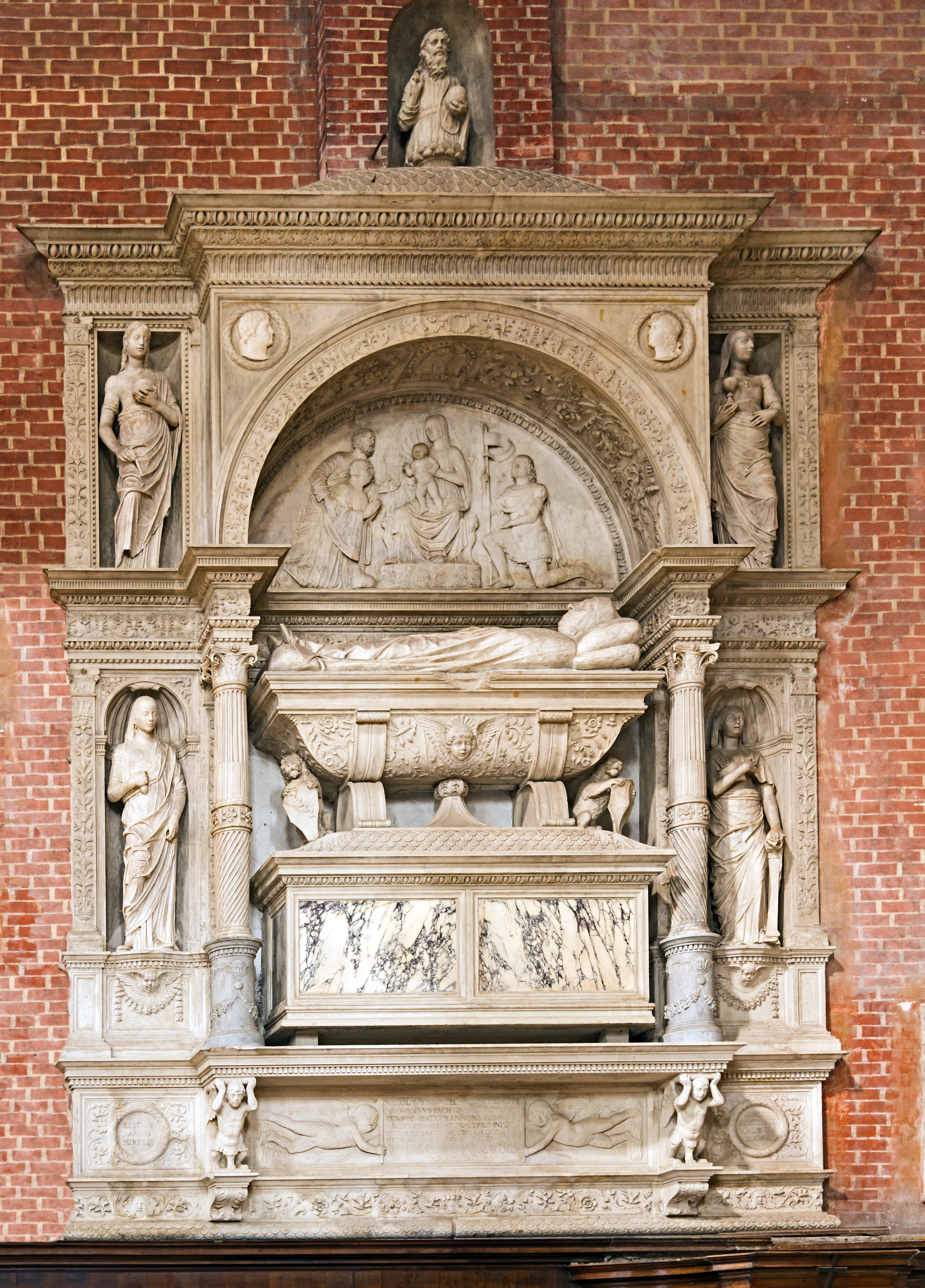
Monument to Nicolo Marcello

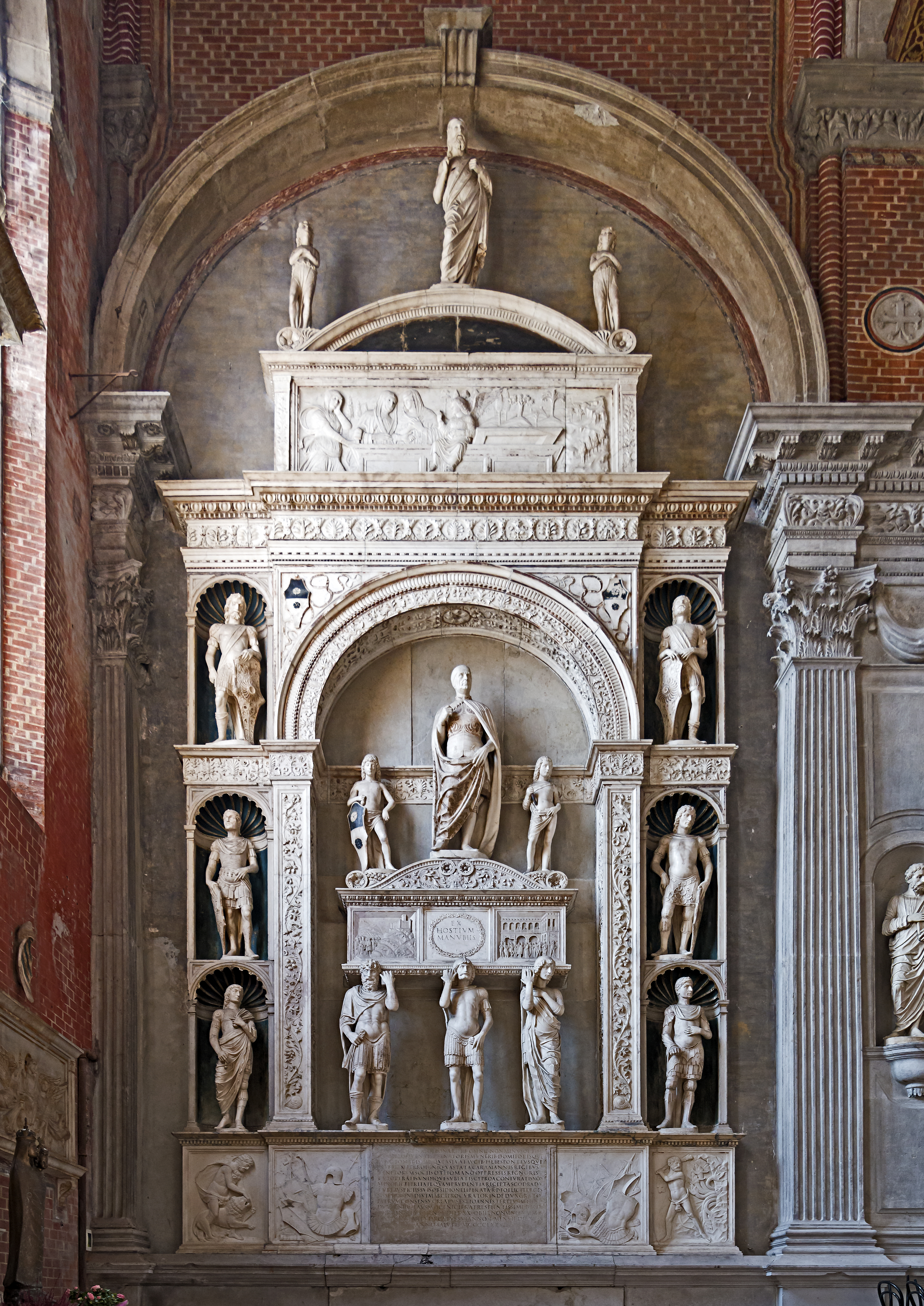
Monument to Pietro Mocenigo

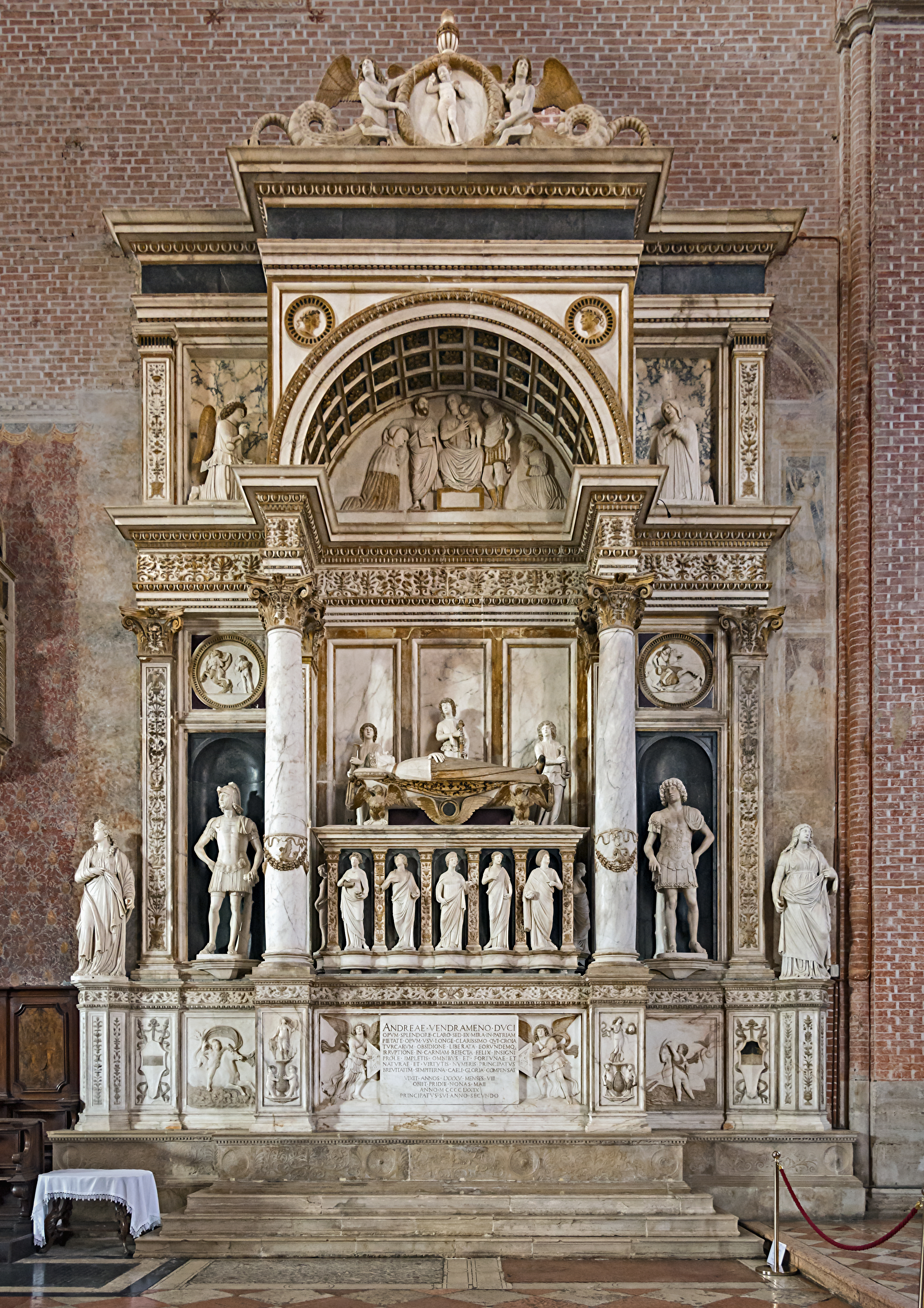
Monument to doge Andrea Vendramin
- Giovanni Mocenigo (d. 1485)
- Leonardo Loredan (d. 1521)
- Alvise I Mocenigo (d. 1577)
- Sebastiano Venier (d. 1578)
- Bertuccio Valier (d. 1658)
- Silvestro Valier (d. 1700)
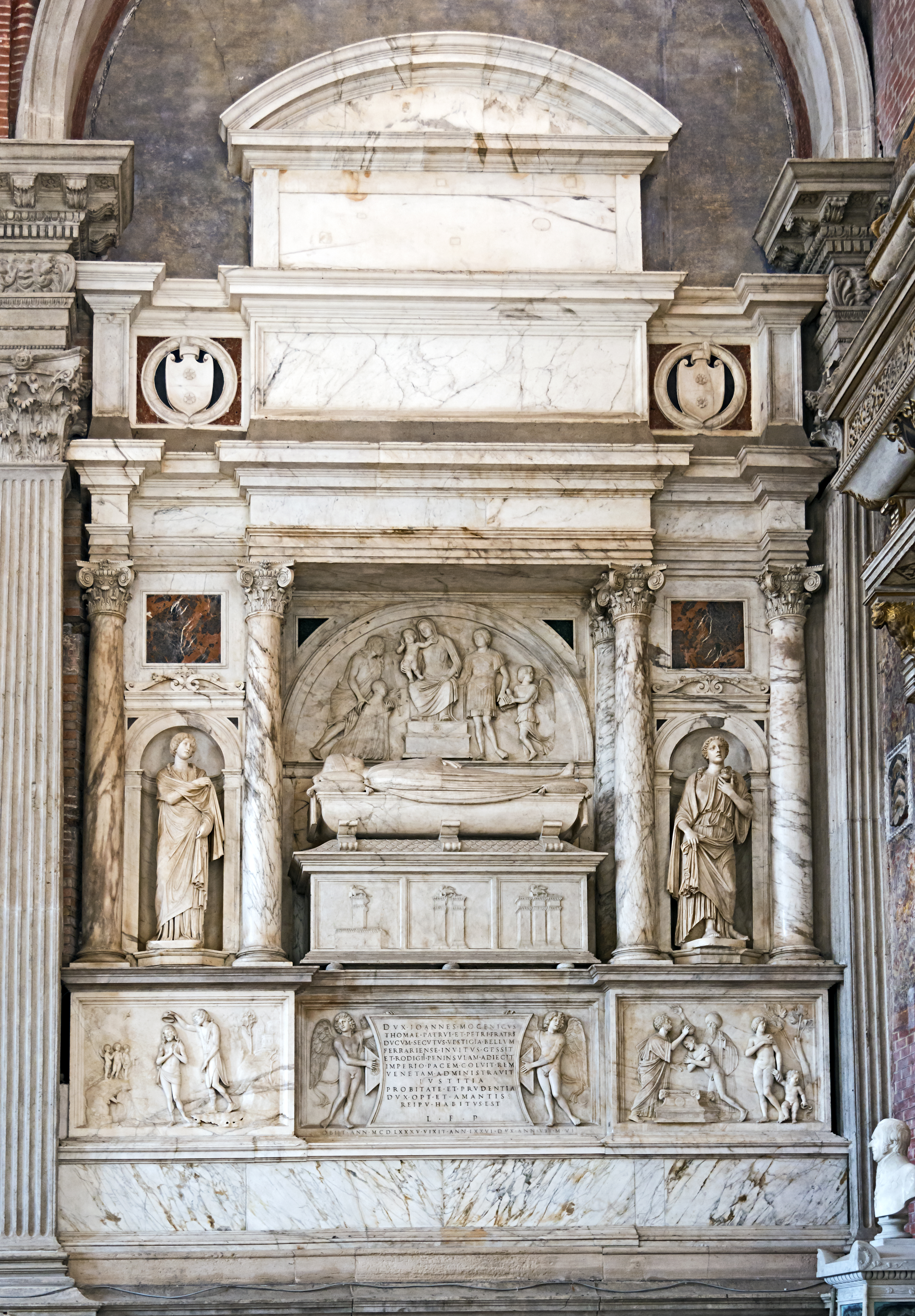
Monument to Giovanni Mocenigo

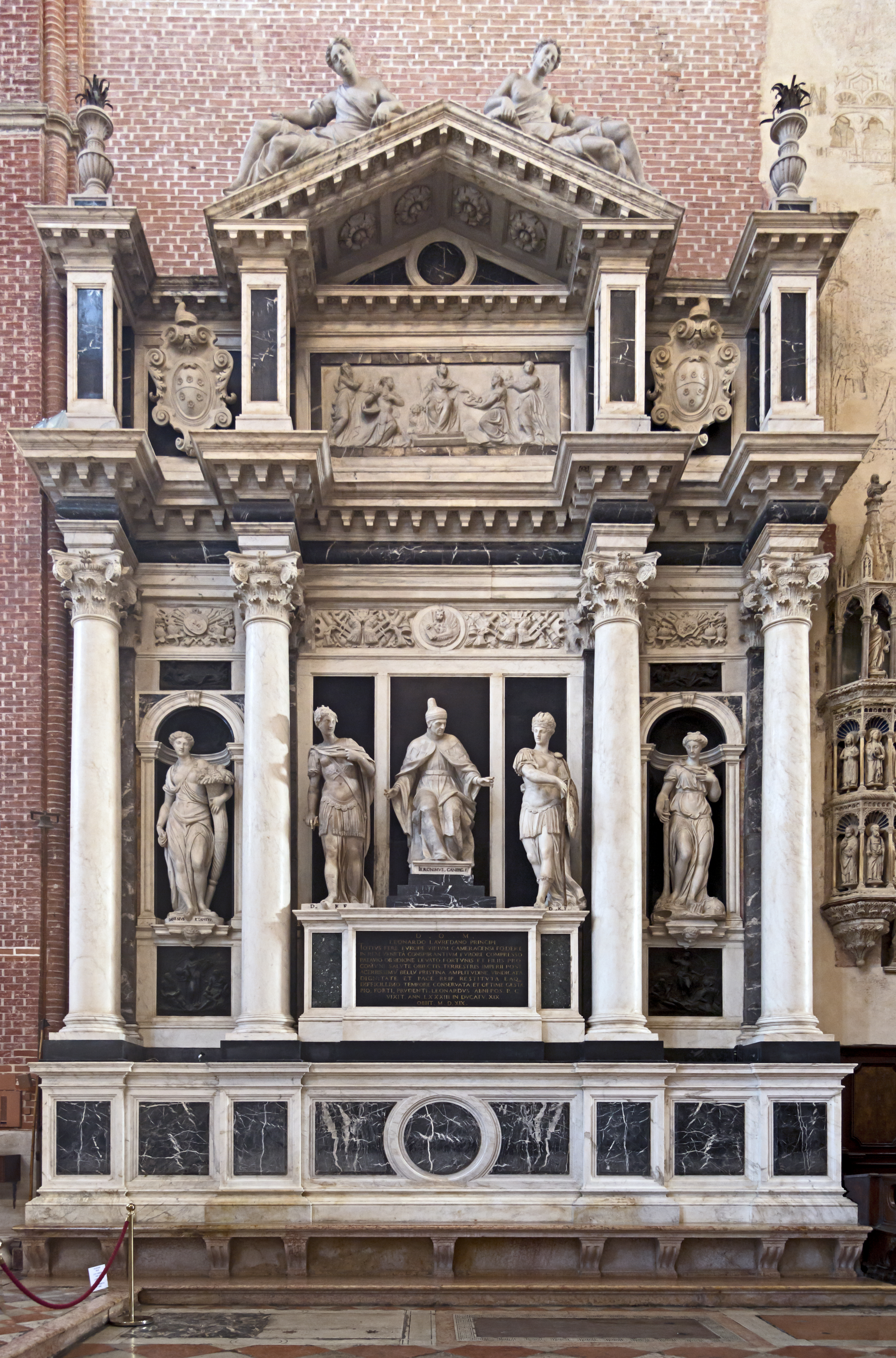
Monument of Leonardo Loredan

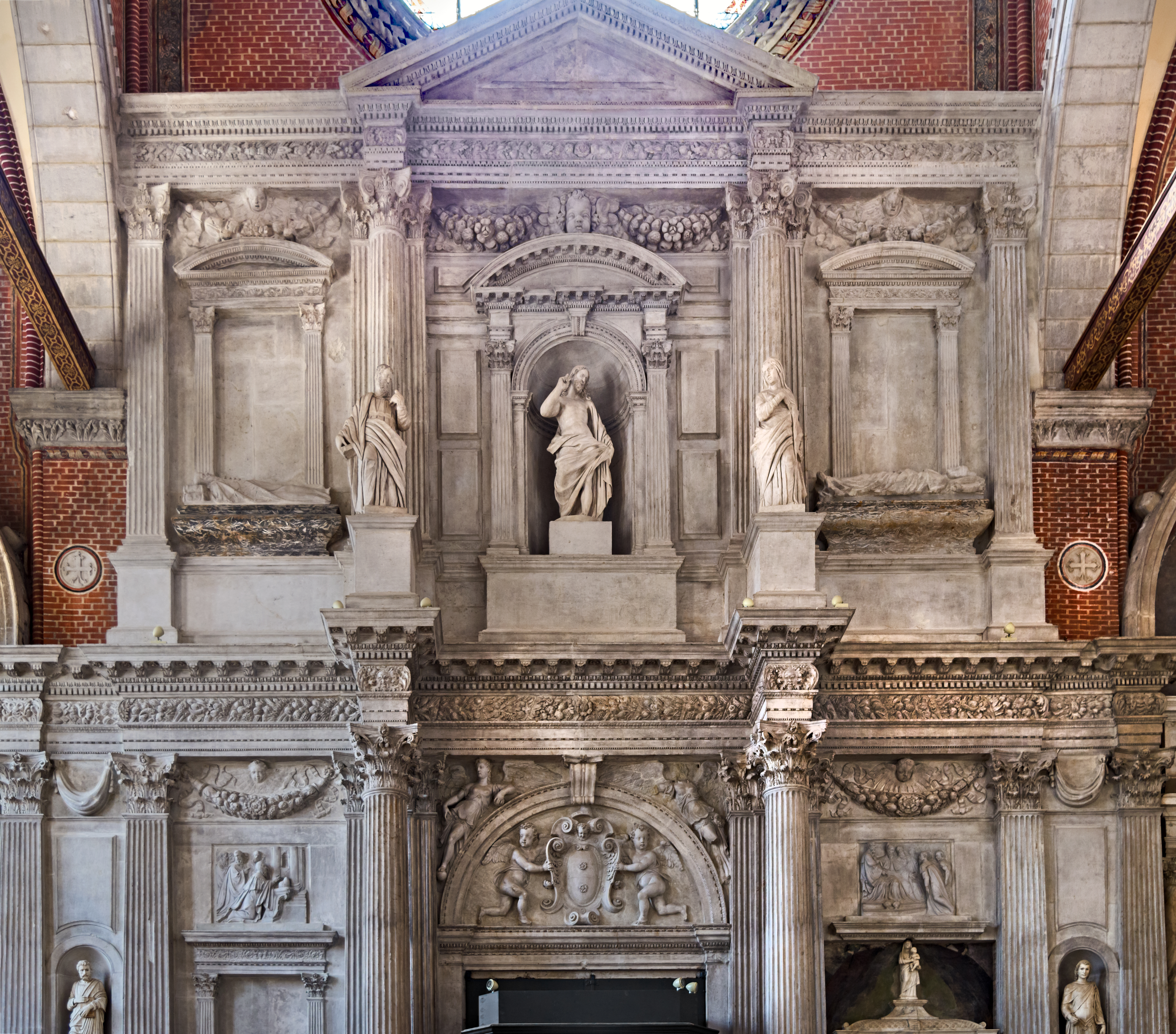
Monument to Alvise Mocenigo

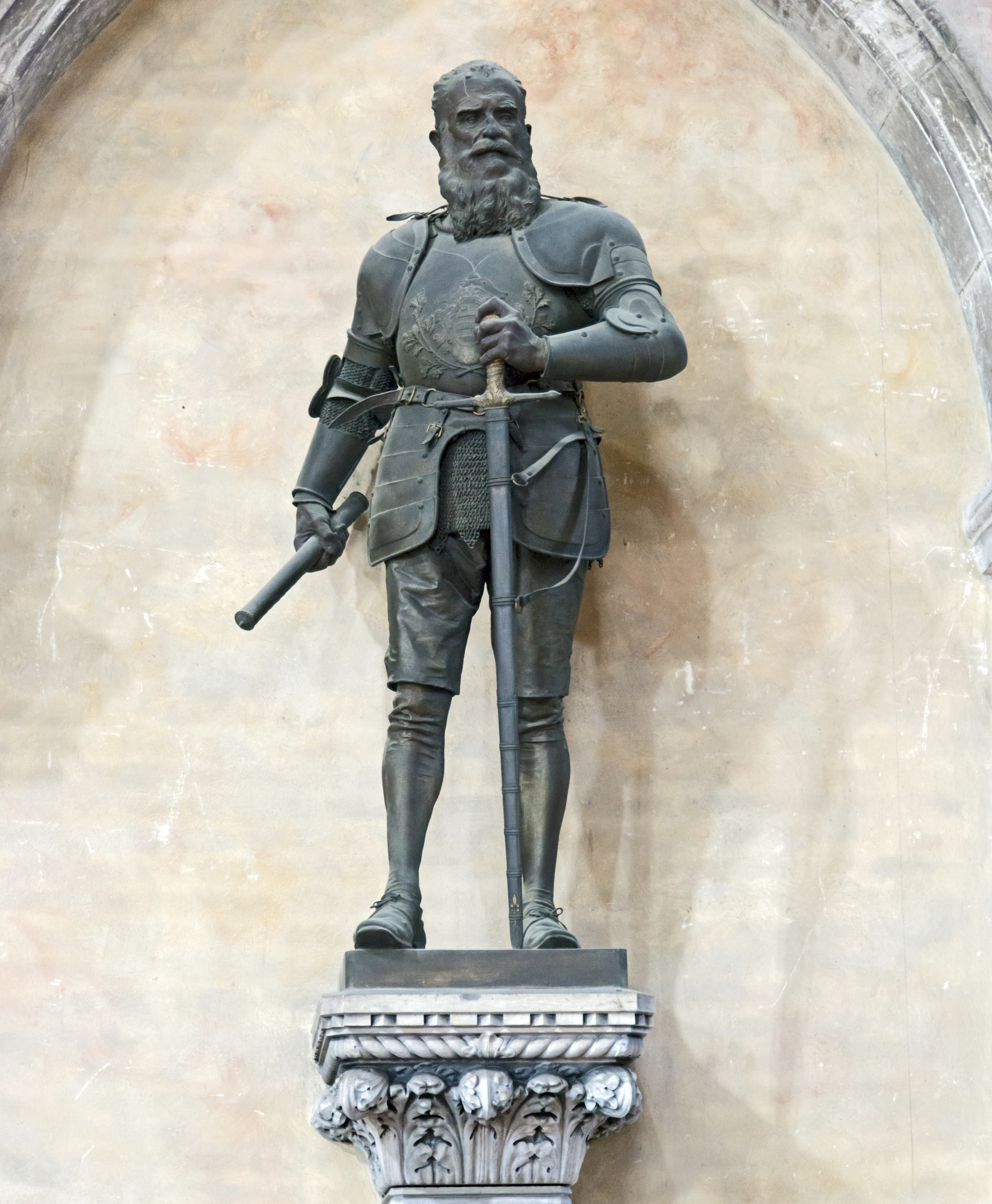
Funeral monument of Sebastiano Venier

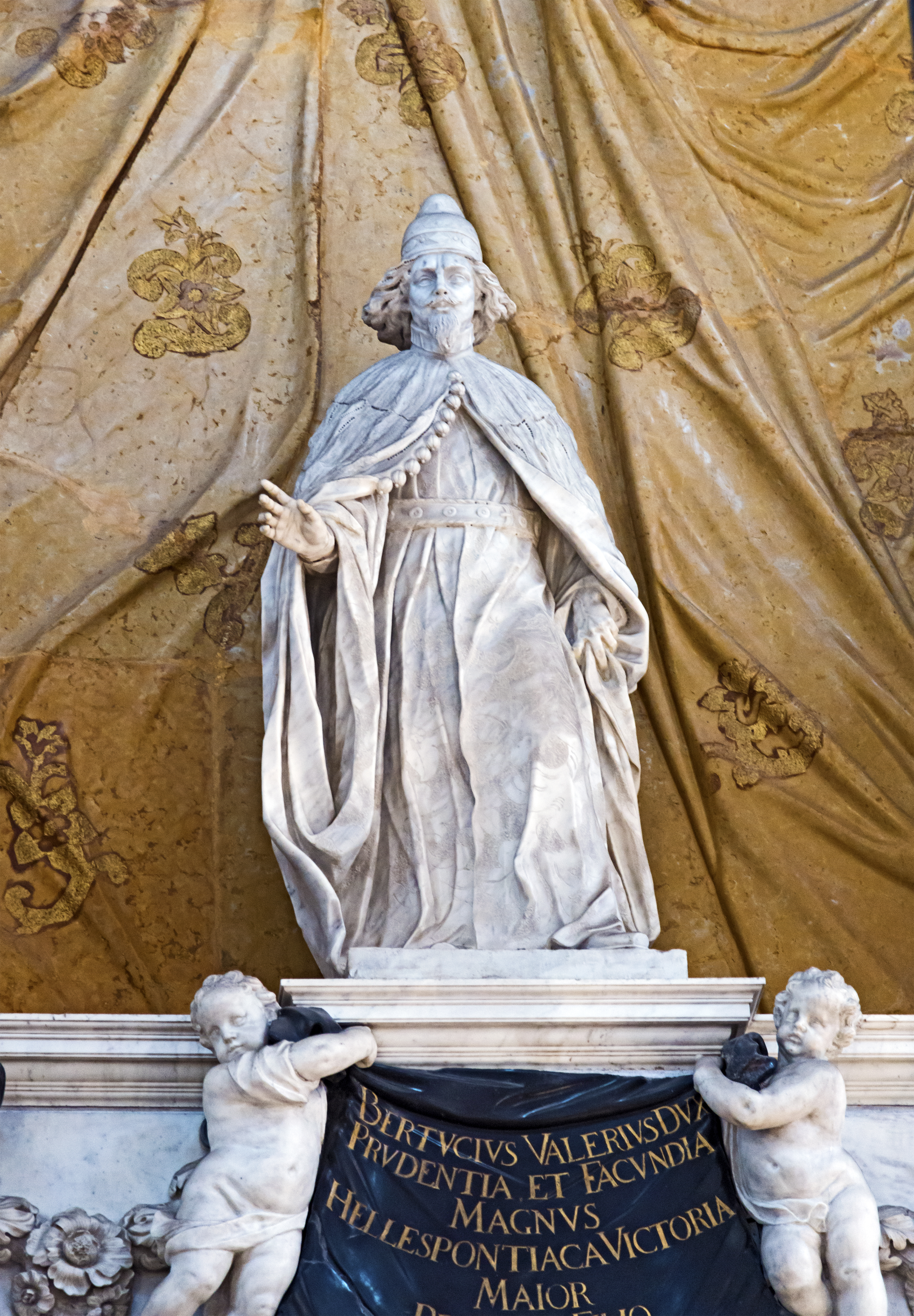
Funeral monument of Bertuccio Valier

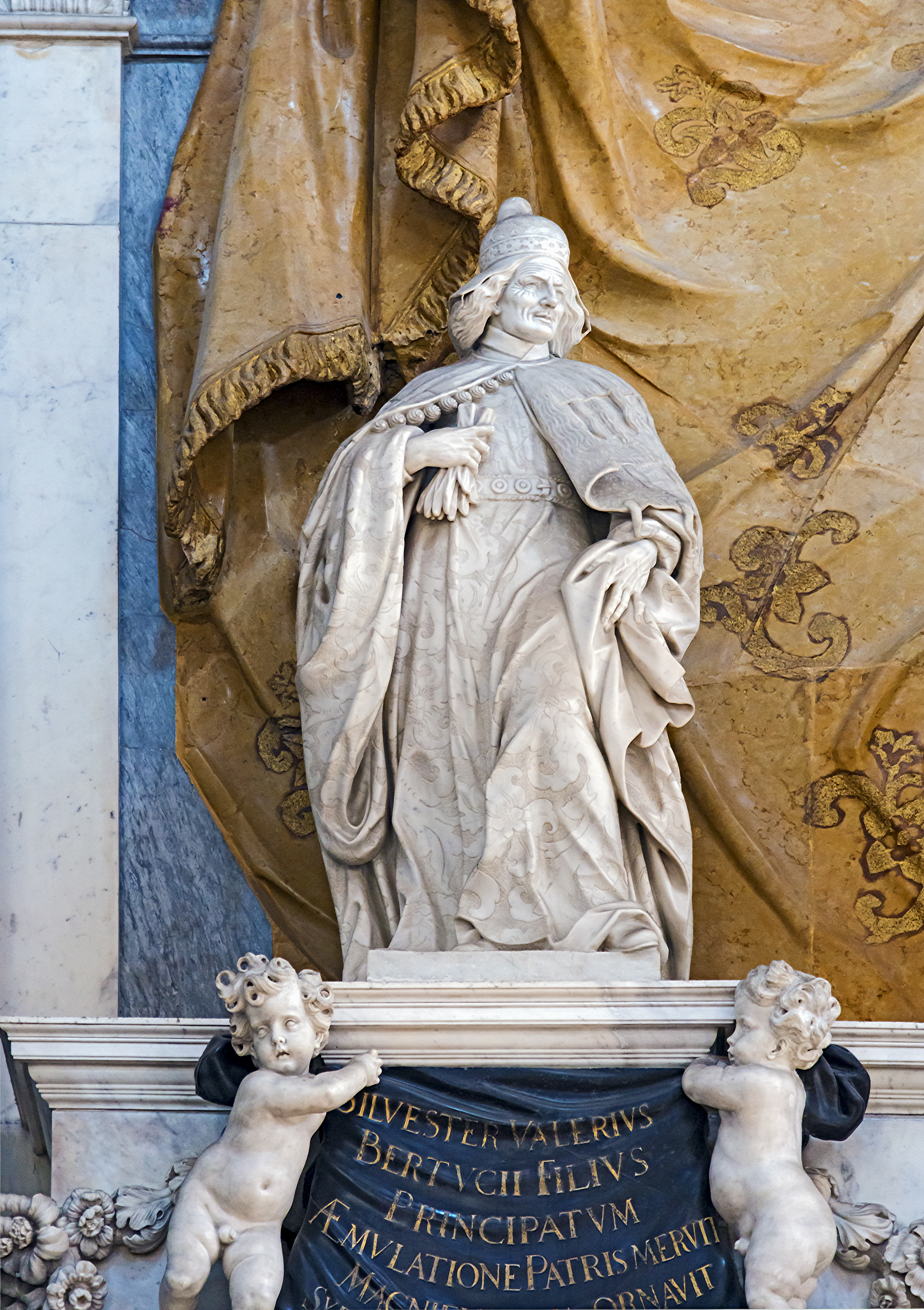
Funeral monument of Silvestro Valier

Other people buried in the church include:

- Orazio Baglioni (d. 1617), general
- Gentile Bellini (d. 1507), artist
- Giovanni Bellini (d. 1516), artist
- Gianbattista Bonzi (d. 1508), senator
- Bartolomeo Bragadin (poet)
- Marco Antonio Bragadin (d.1571), general, flayed alive by the Turks - the tomb contains only his skin
- Jacopo Cavalli (d. 1384), general
- Alvise Diedo, commander-in-chief
- Marino Faliero (d. 1355), the 55th Doge of Venice, beheaded
- Marco Giustiniani (d. 1346), sea captain
- Pompeo Giustiniani (d. 1616), condottiere
- Palma the Younger (d. 1628), artist
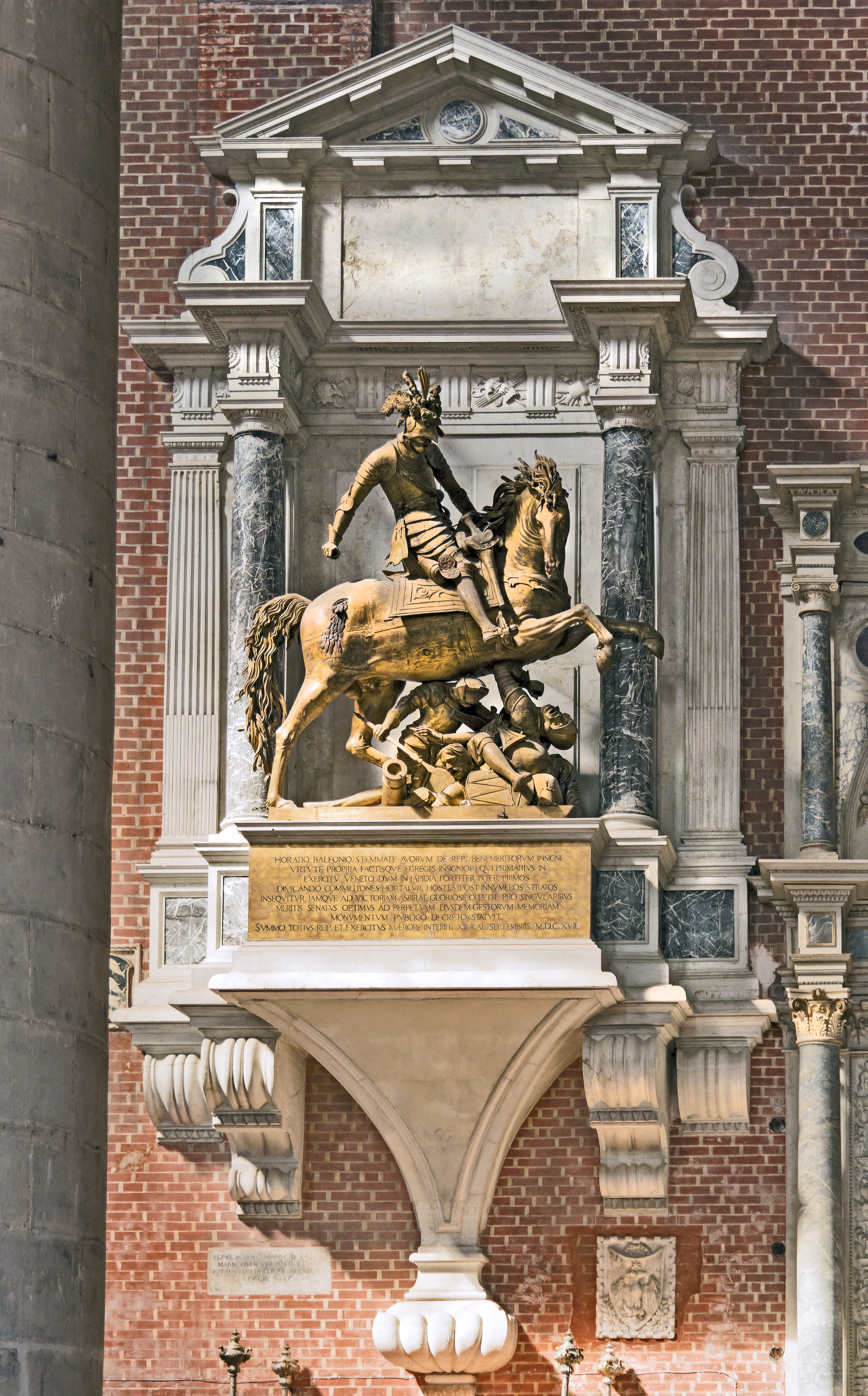
Monument to Orazio Baglioni

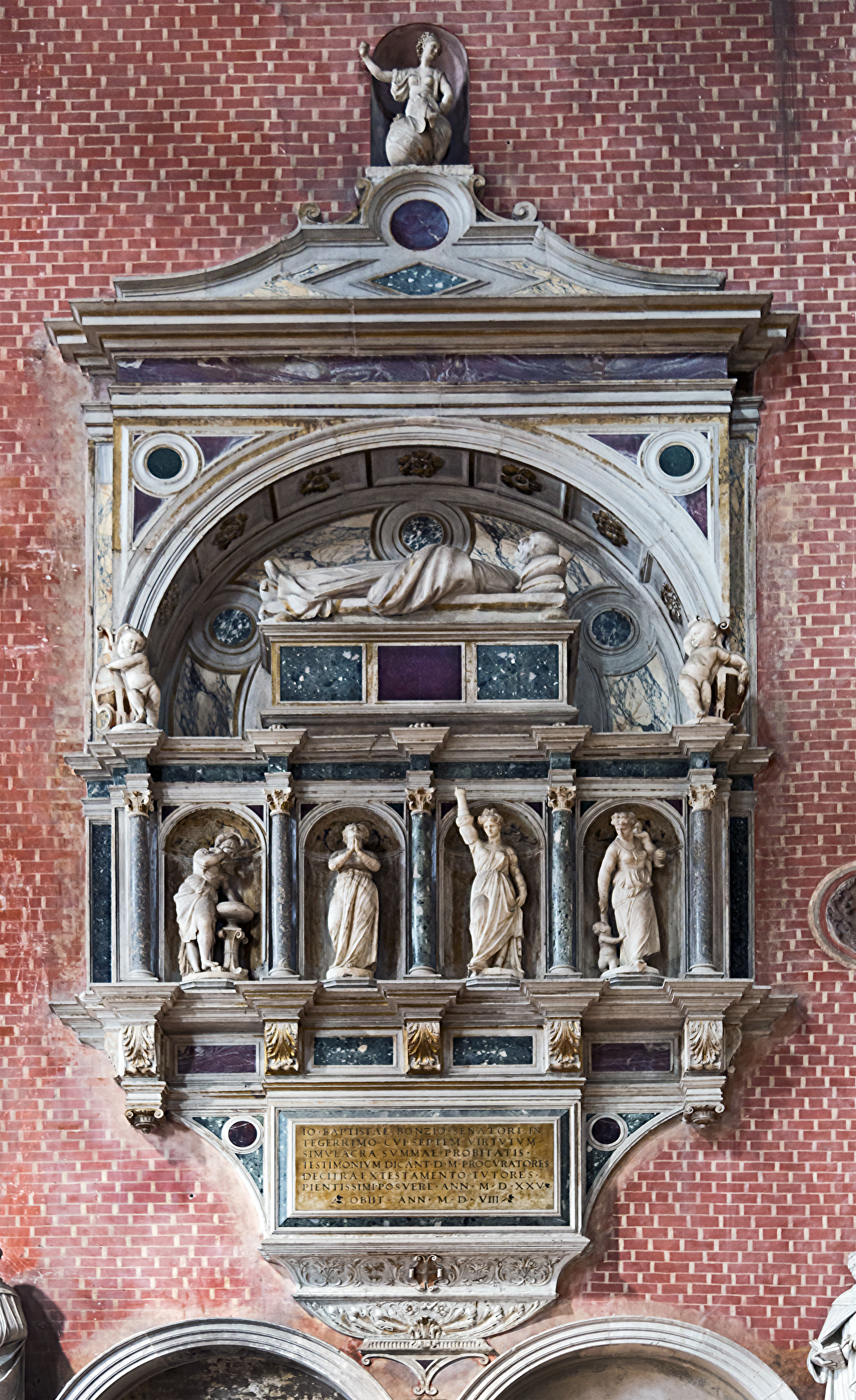
Monument to Giambattista Bonzio

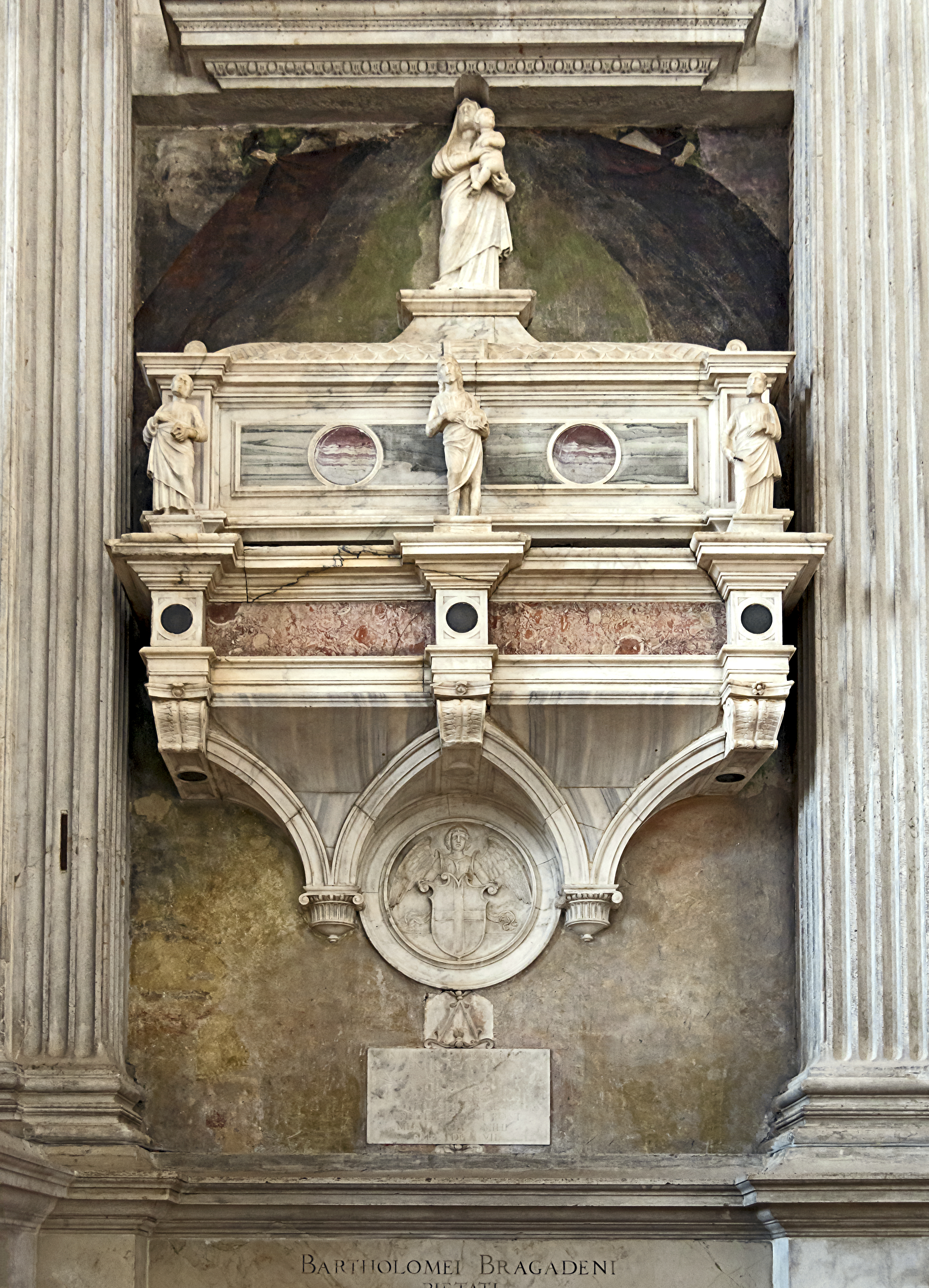
Monument to Bartolomeo Bragadin

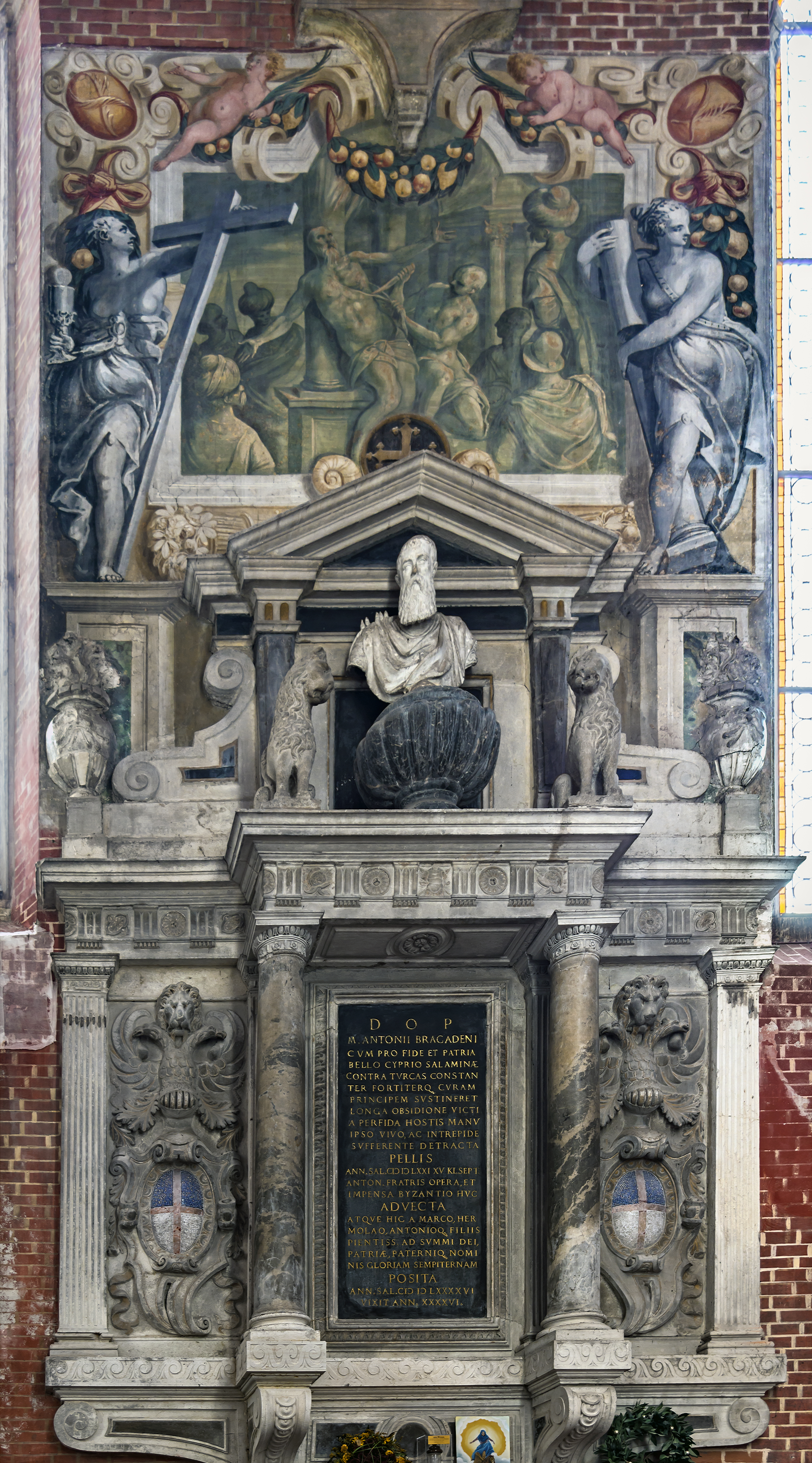
Monument to Marcantonio Bragadin

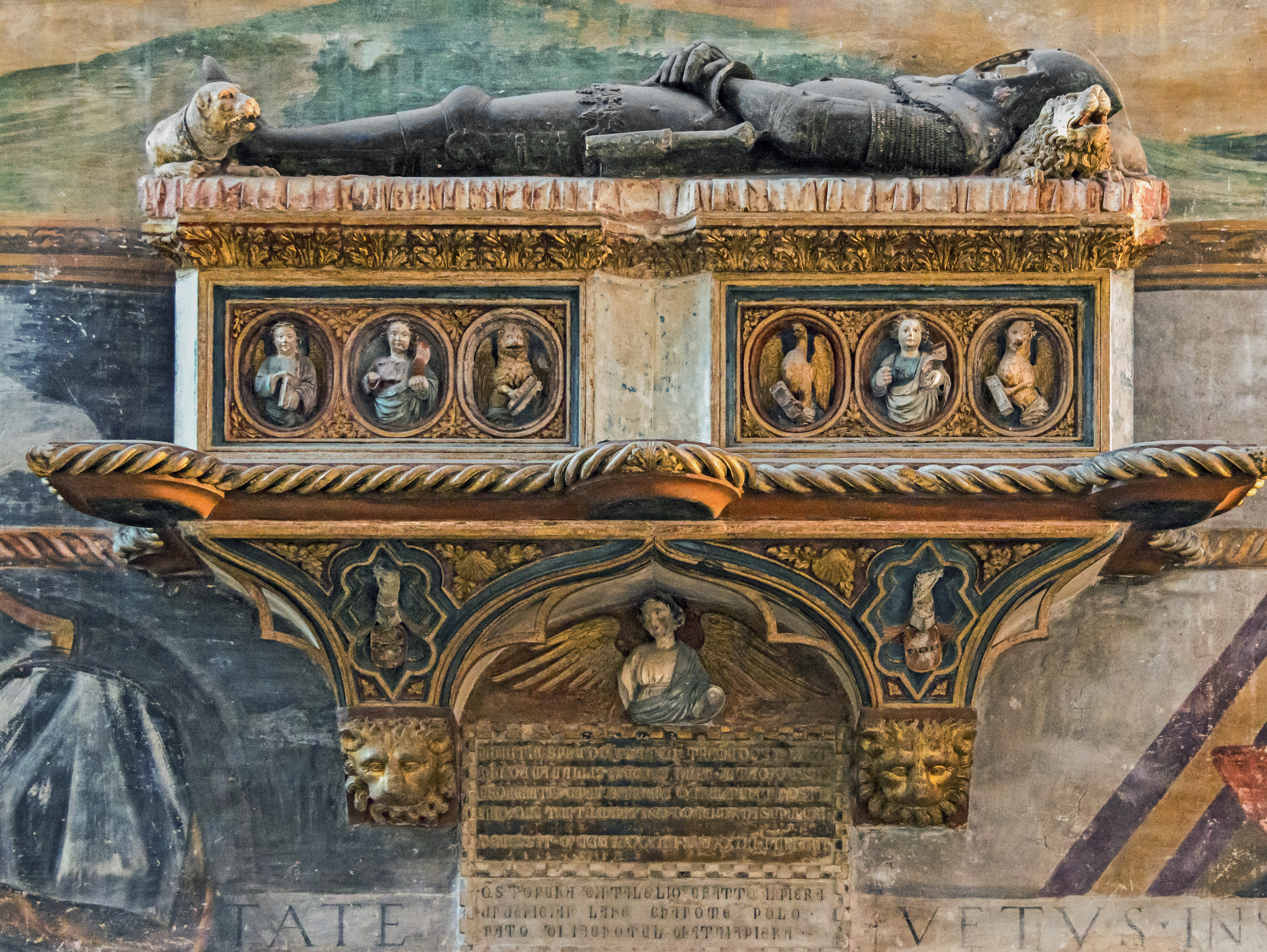
Monument to Giacomo Cavalli

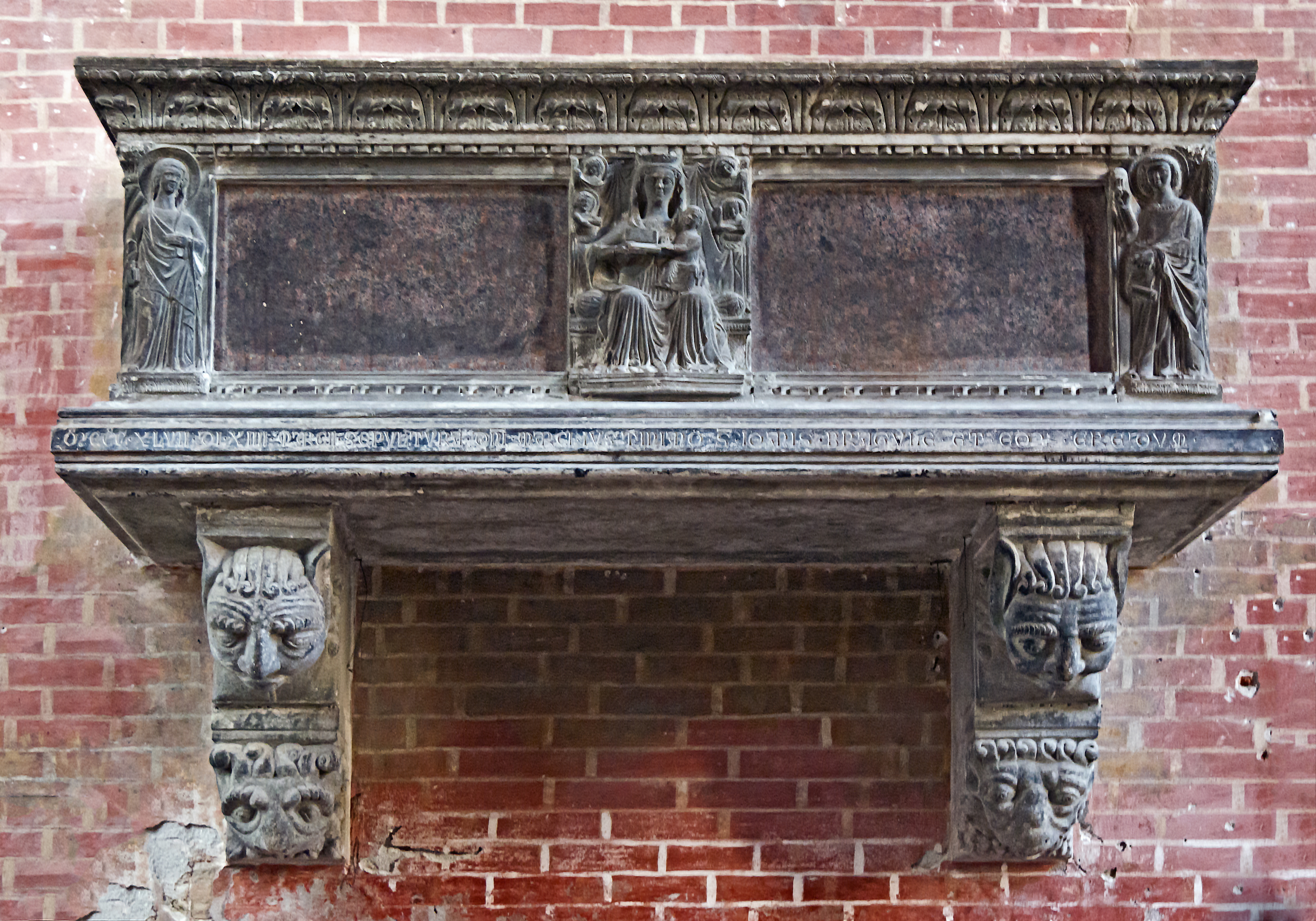
Monument to Marco Giustiniani della Bragora

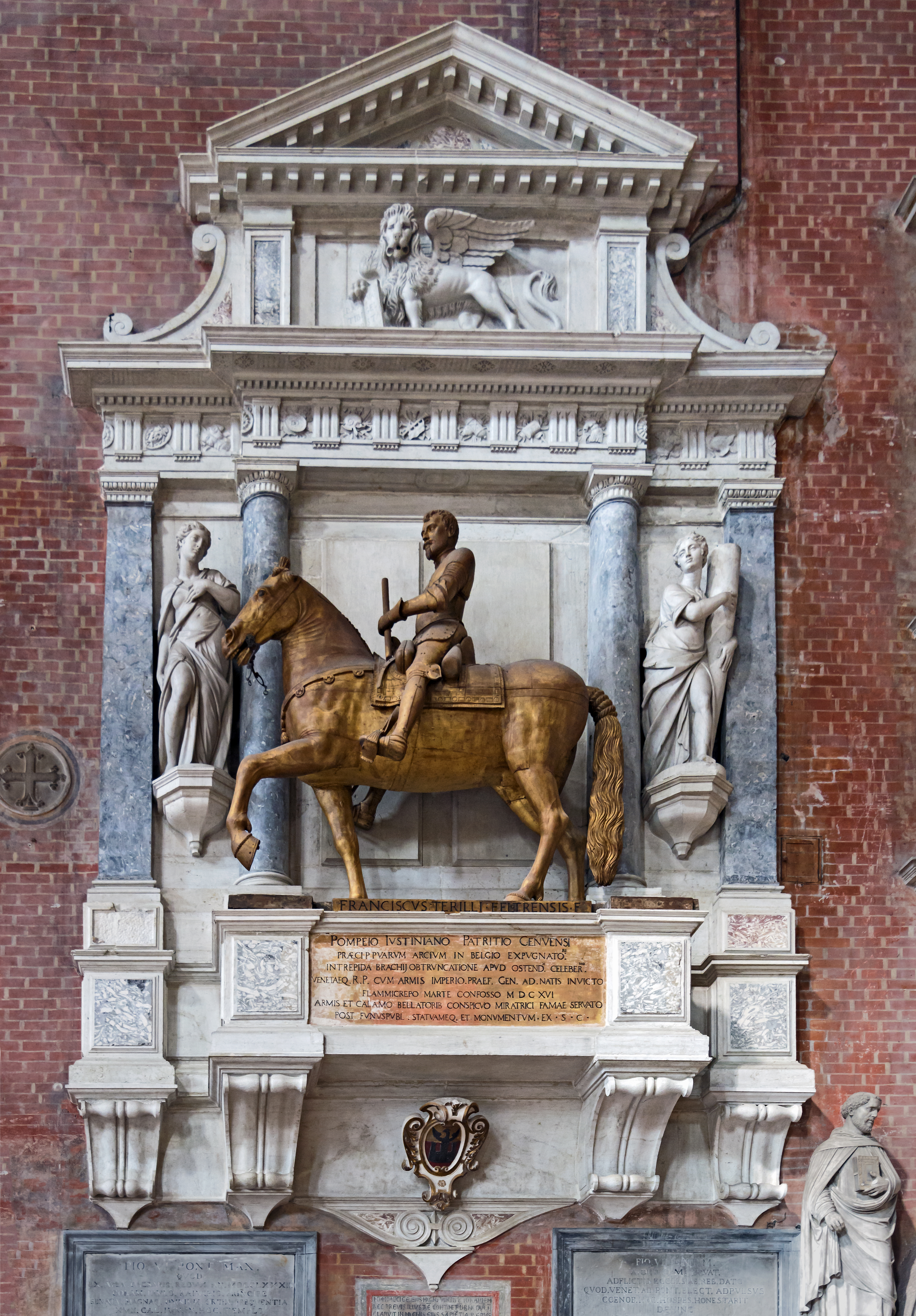
Monument to Pompeo Giustiniani

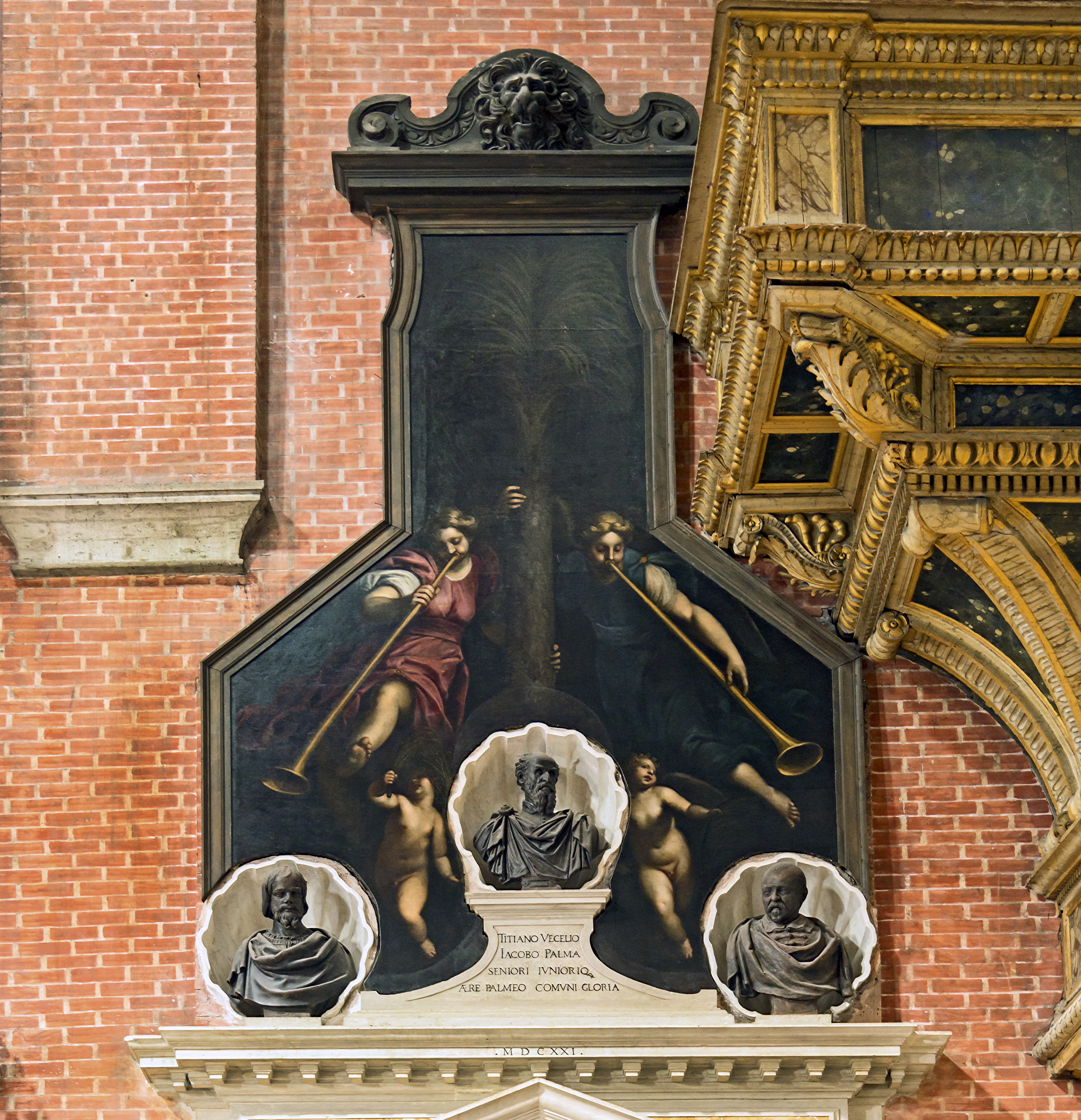
Monument to Palma il Giovane
- Vettor Pisani (d. 1380), admiral
- Niccolò Orsini, (d. 1510), commander-in-chief
- Leonardo da Prato (d.1511), condottiere
- Alvise Trevisan (d. 1528)
- Edward Windsor, 3rd Baron Windsor (d. 1574)
- Vincenzo Benedetti, (d. 1658)
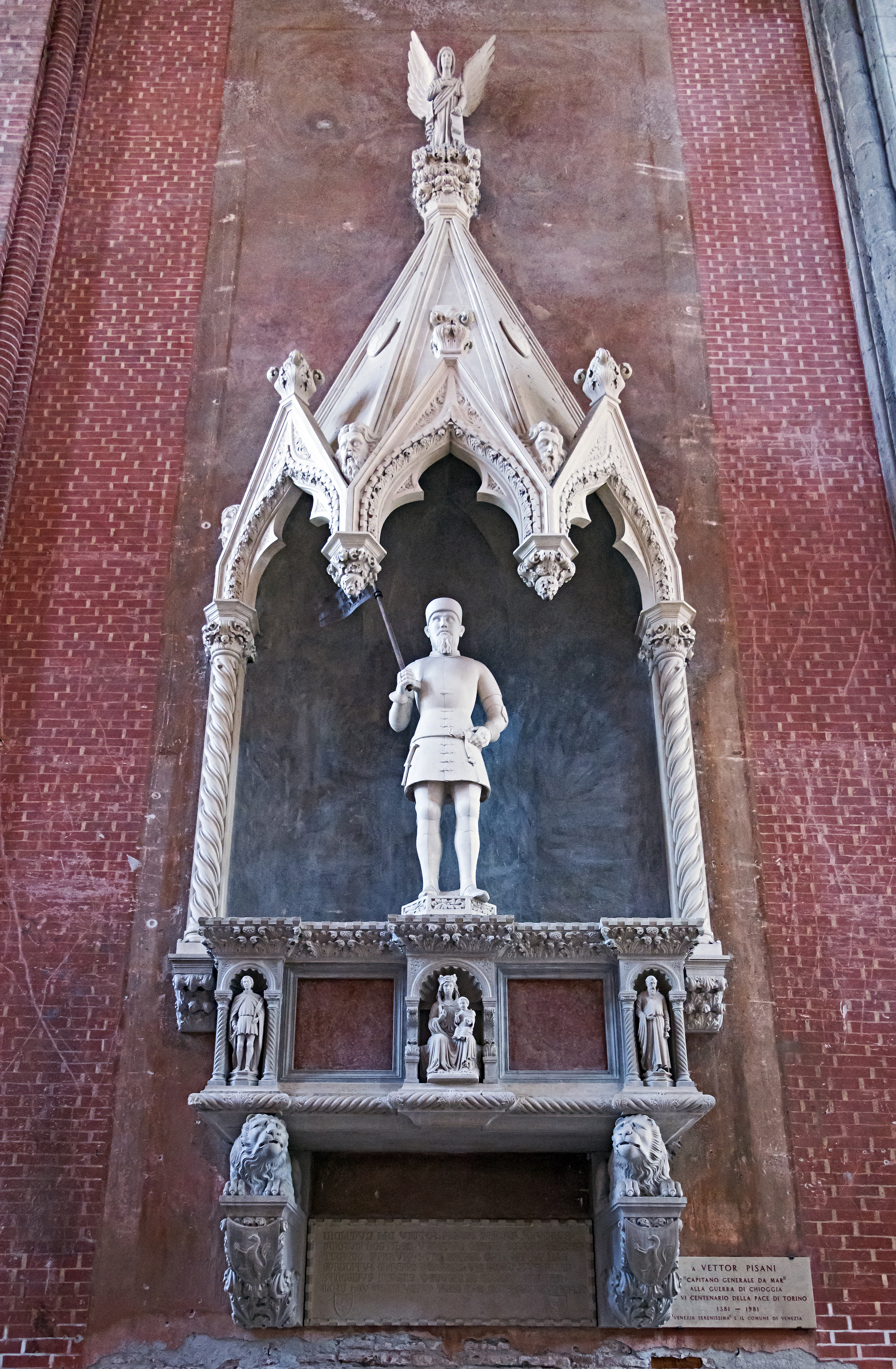
Monument of Admiral Vettor Pisani

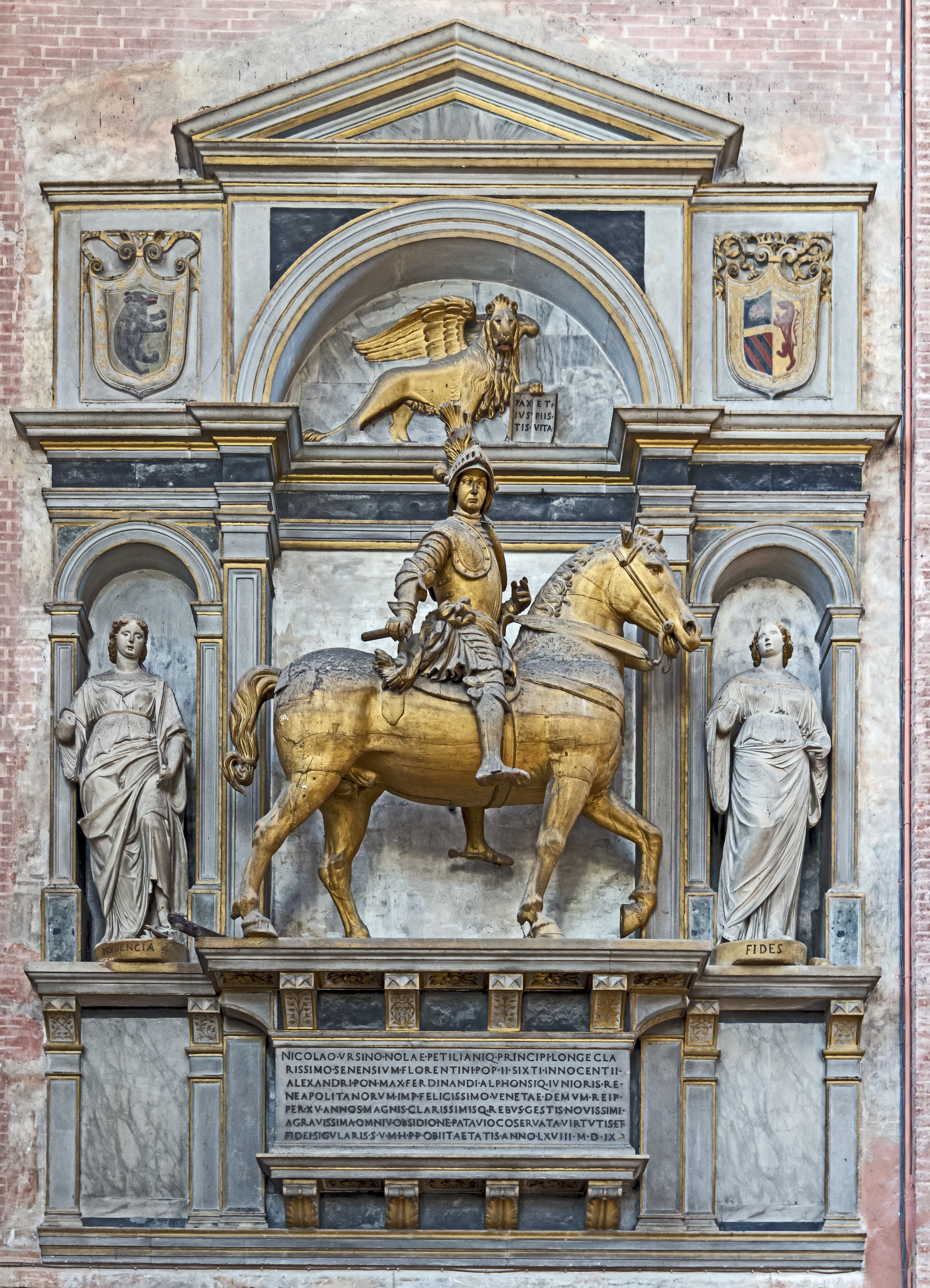
Tomb of Niccolò Orsini di Pitigliano

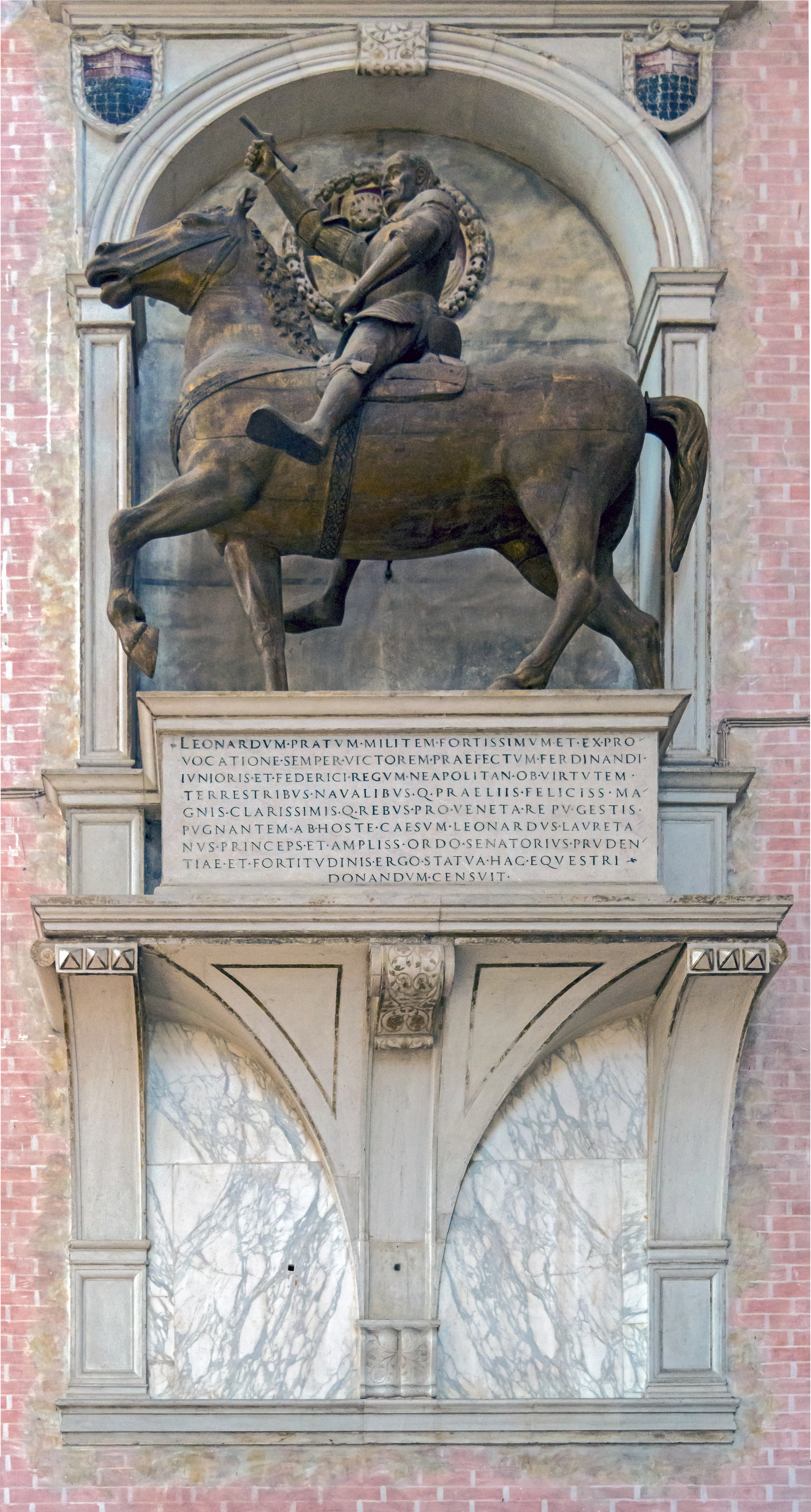
Tomb of Leonardo da Prato

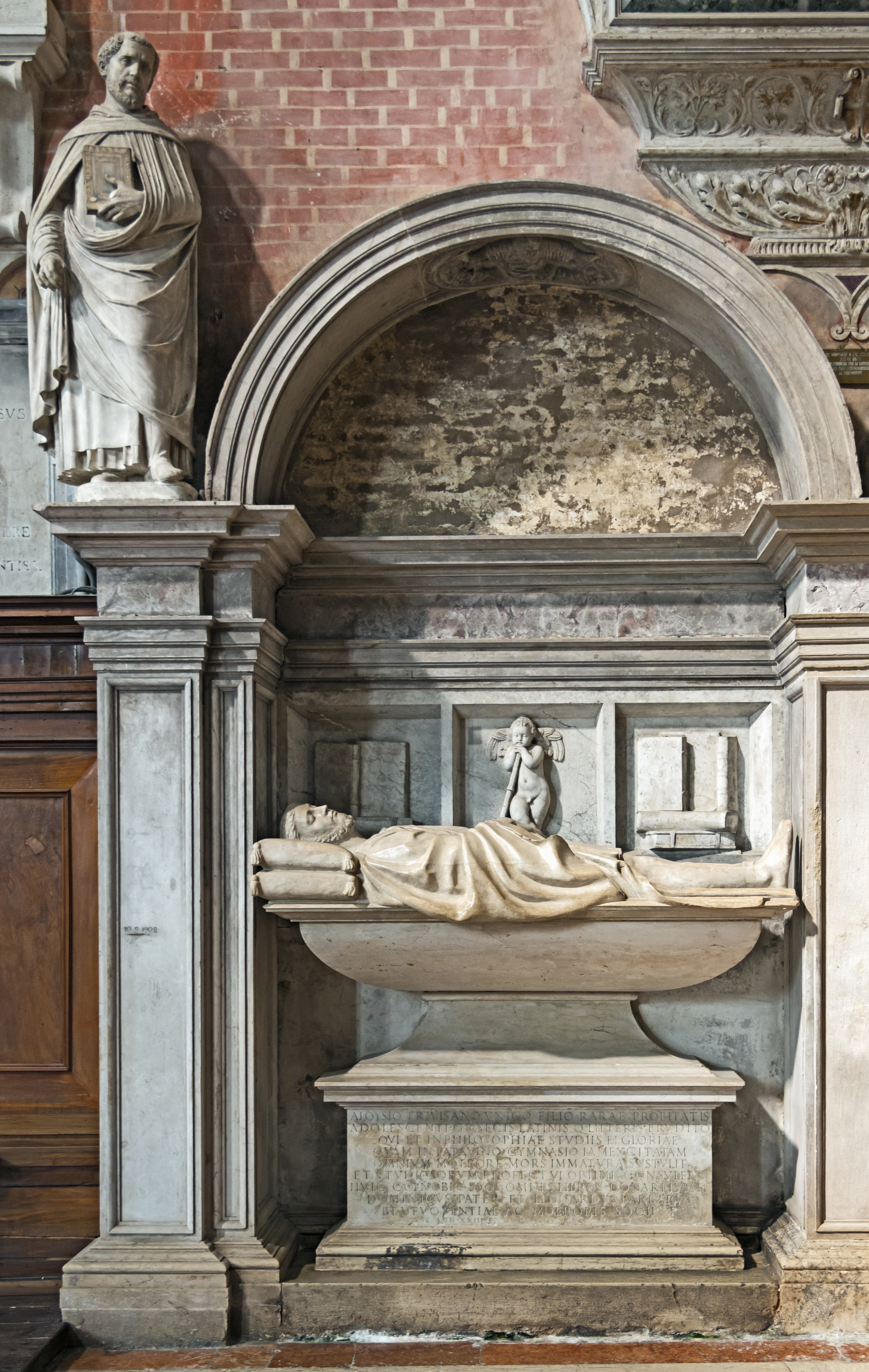
Monument to Alvise Trevisan

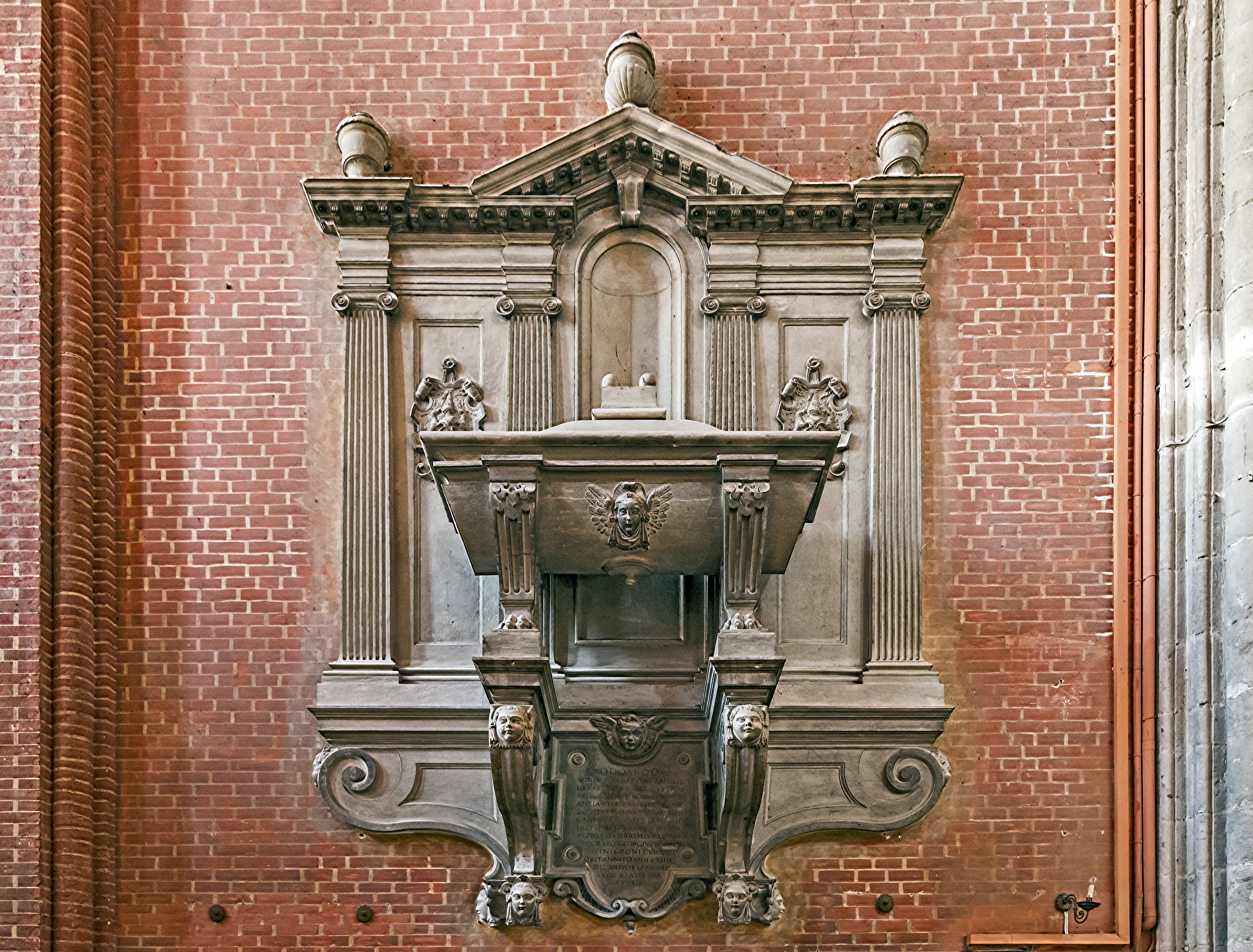
Tomb of Edward Windsor

== See also ==
- Italian Gothic architecture
- List of doges of Venice
- Lost artworks
- Sant'Anastasia (Verona) — similar Dominican church in Verona.
- High medieval domes
- List of buildings and structures in Venice
- List of churches in Venice

Preceded by Santa Maria Gloriosa dei Frari	Venice landmarks Santi Giovanni e Paolo	Succeeded by St Mark's Basilica
