= Pietro Contarini =

Pietro Contarini may refer to:

- Pietro Contarini (died 1495), Venetian humanist
- Pietro Contarini (1452–1528), Venetian writer
- Pietro Contarini (1477–1543), Venetian poet
- Pietro Contarini (1491–1563), bishop in Venetian Cyprus
- Pietro Francesco Contarini (1502–1555), patriarch of Venice
- Pietro Contarini (1578–1632), Venetian diplomat
- Pietro Contarini (1798–1852), Venetian linguist
