= Contarini =

One of the founding families of Venice

Coat of arms of the House of Contarini

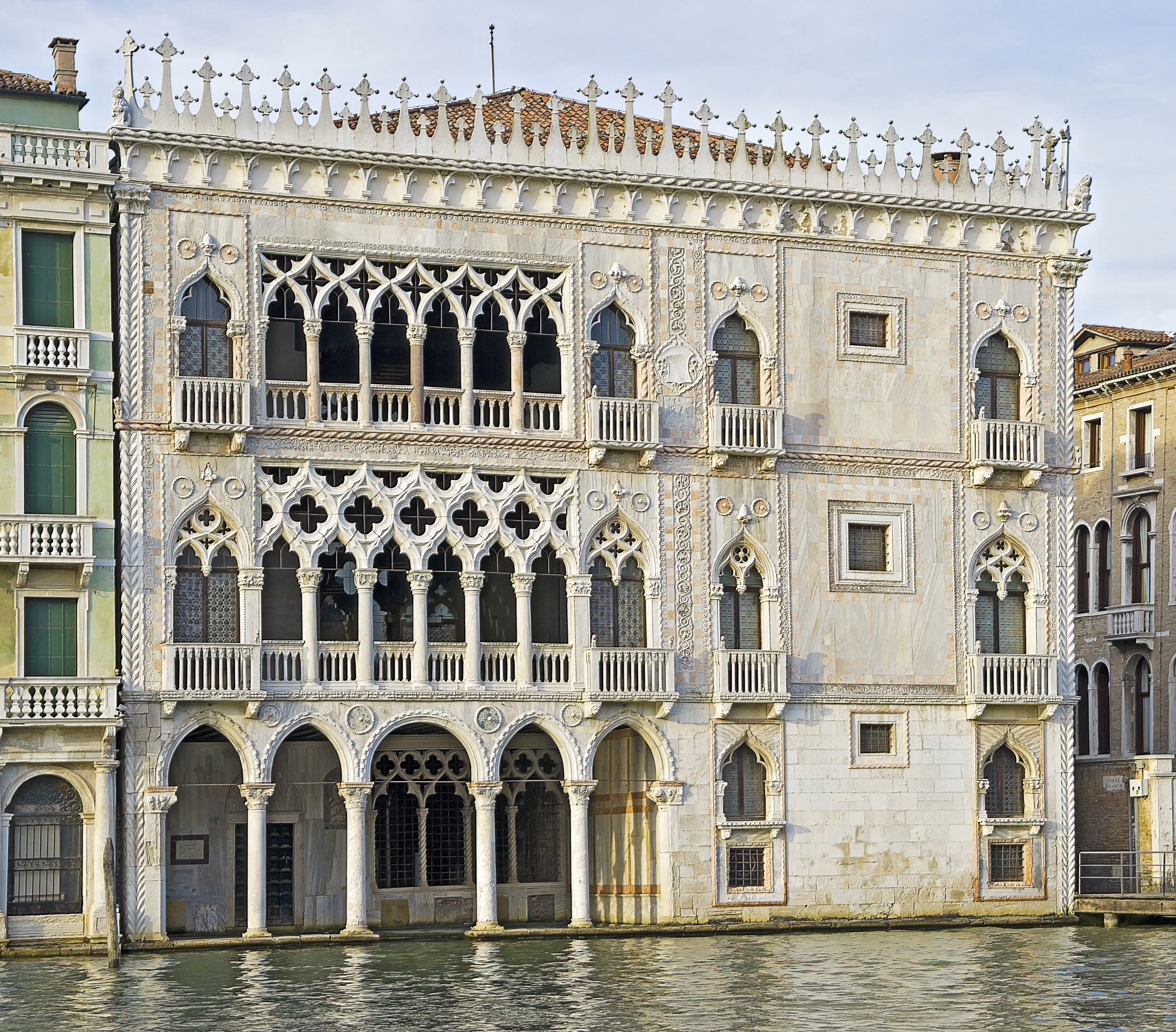
The Ca' d'Oro, built for the Contarini family in 1428-30

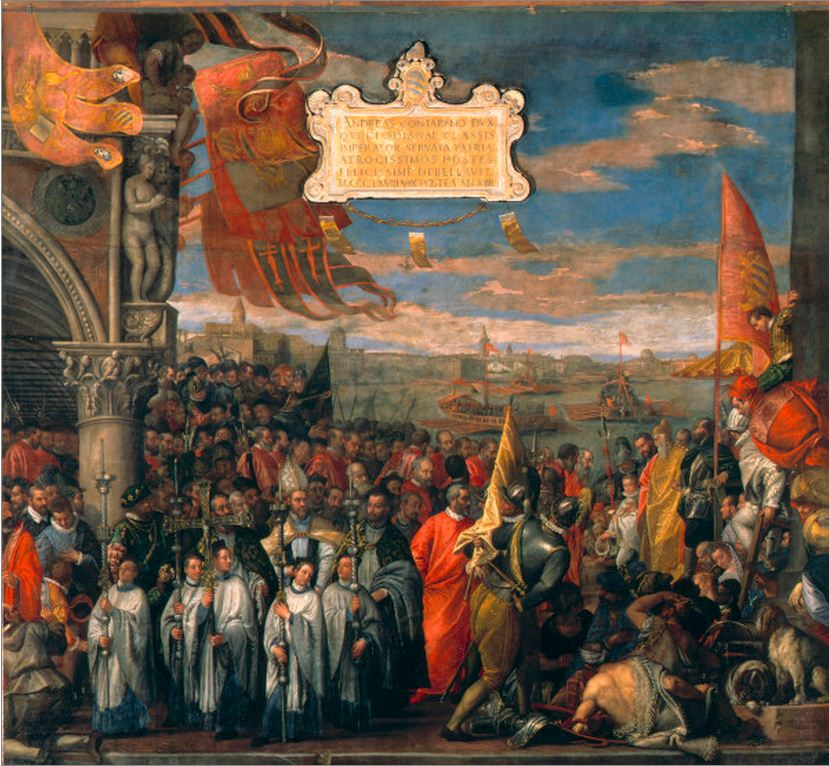
Doge Andrea Contarini returning victorious from the War of Choggia in 1380 (Palazzo Ducale)

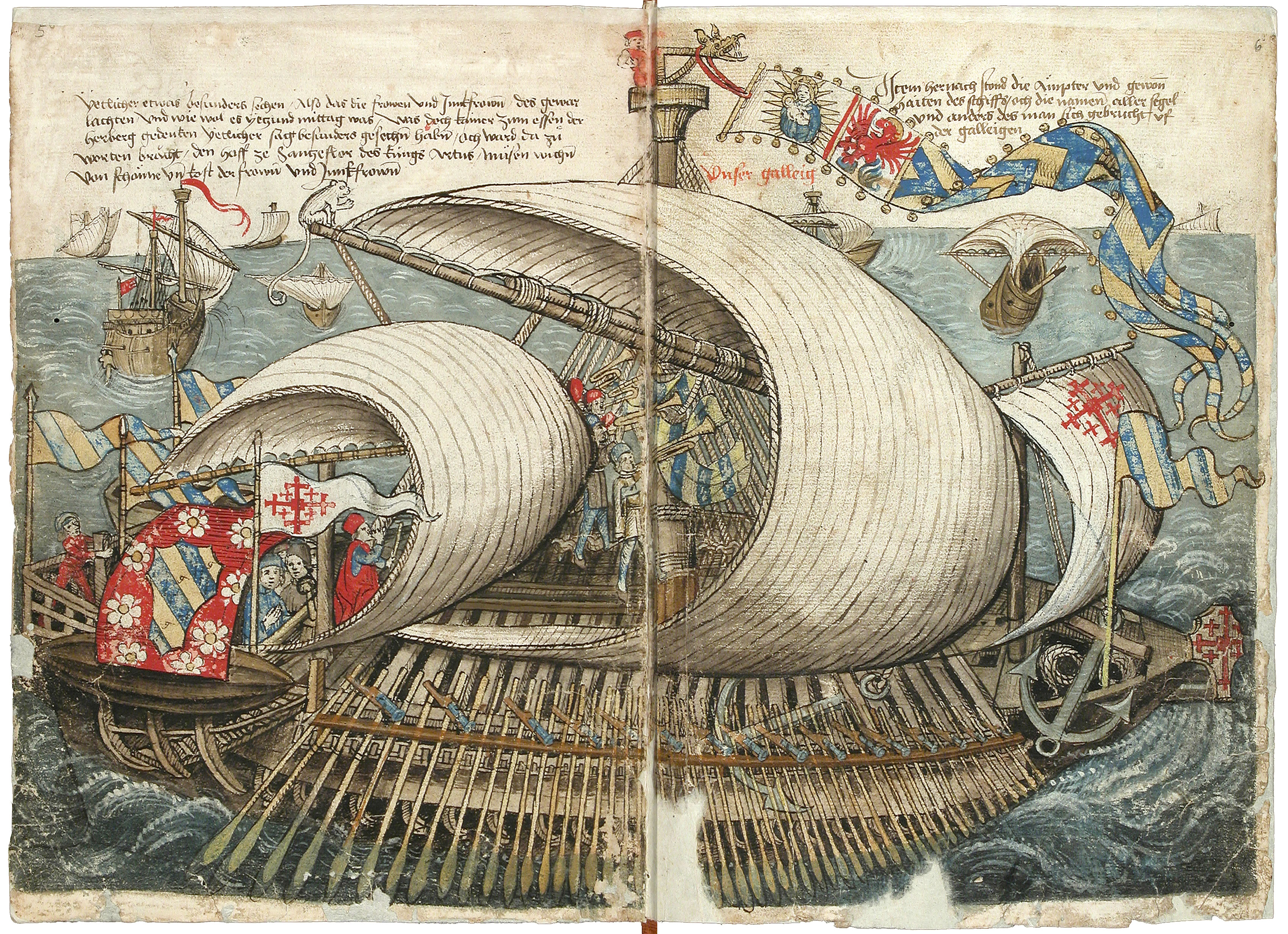
A galley of Augustinus Contarini illustrated by Conrad Grünenberg after his pilgrimage to Jerusalem in 1486 (Badische Landesbibliothek)

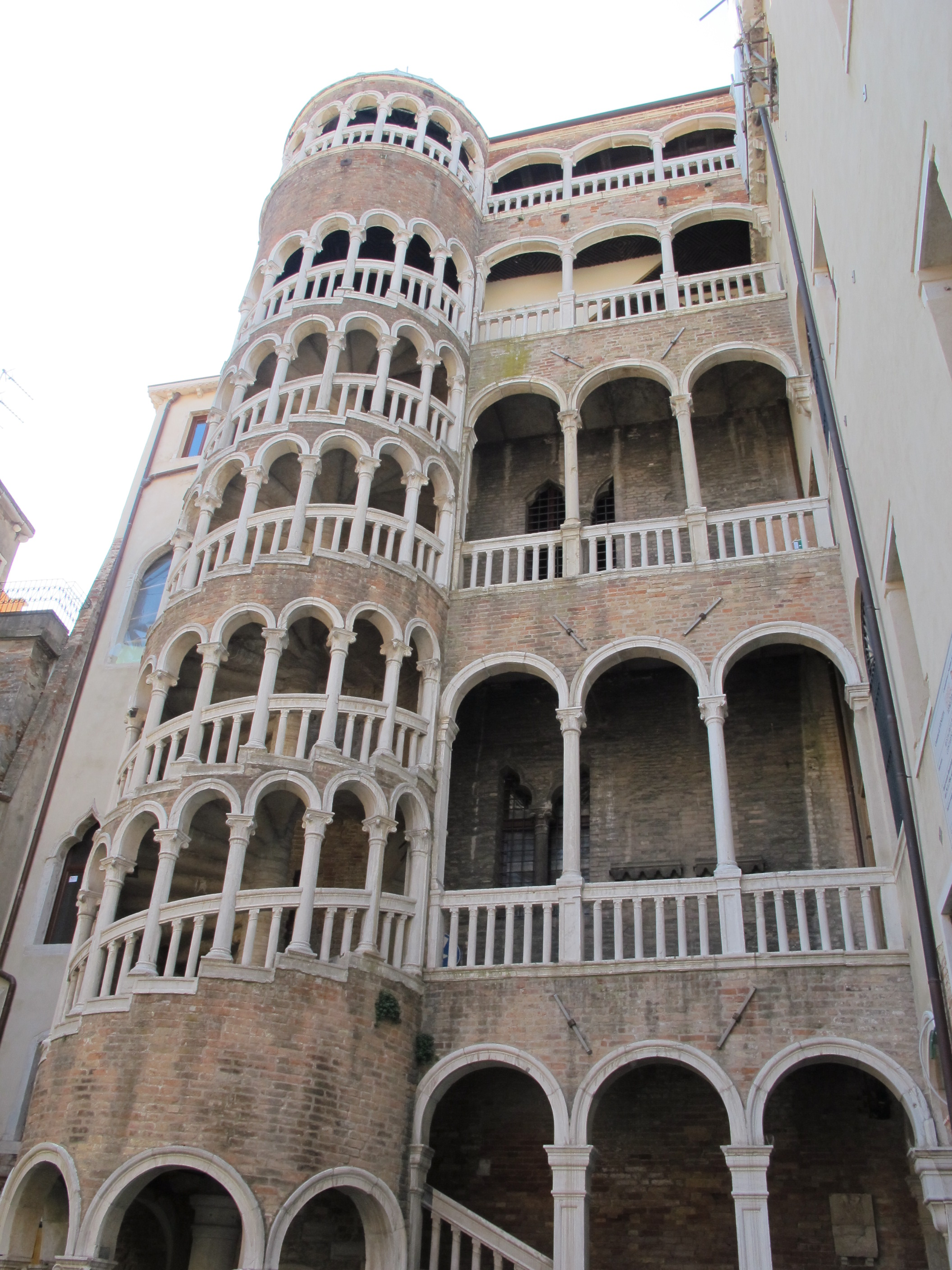
The Palazzo Contarini del Bovolo, built for the Contarini family in the 15th century

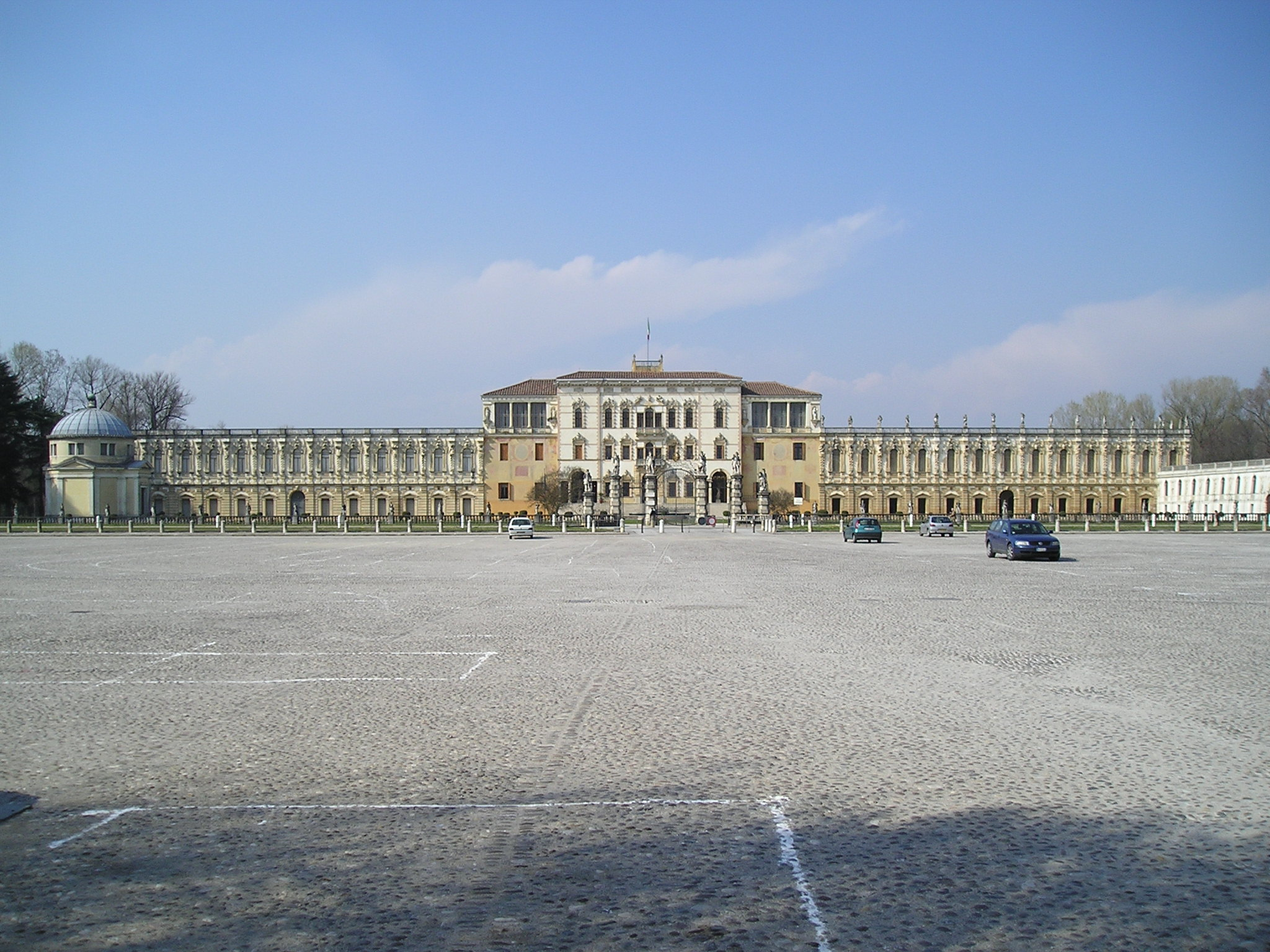
The Villa Contarini, commissioned by Paolo and Francesco Contarini in 1546

The Contarini is one of the founding families of Venice and one of the oldest families of the Italian Nobility. In total eight Doges of the Republic of Venice emerged from this family, as well as 44 Procurators of San Marco, numerous ambassadors, diplomats and other notables. Among the ruling families of the republic, they held the most seats in the Great Council of Venice from the period before the Serrata del Maggior Consiglio when Councillors were elected annually to the end of the republic in 1797. The Contarini claimed to be of Roman origin through their patrilineal descendance of the Aurelii Cottae, a branch of the Roman family Aurelia, and traditionally trace their lineage back to Gaius Aurelius Cotta, consul of the Roman Republic in 252 BC and 248 BC.

== Family ==
The House of Contarini is one of the twelve founding families of the Venetian Republic, the apostolic families, and were and remain through extended family consanguinity present in the Veneto's population, represented in over twenty auxiliary and cadet noble branches that include ranks currently among European sovereign, royal and aristocratic descendants.

853 AD marks the first officially verified documentation of the Contarini in the Republic of Venice, with Andrea Contarini named in the testament of Orso Partecipazio, son of Giovanni I Participazio. According to manuscripts in the Biblioteca Marciana and the family archives the Contarini claim direct descent of the Roman gens Aurelii Cottae through Publius Aurelius Cotta, son of Marcus Aurelius Cotta (consul in 74 BC and maternal uncle of Julius Caesar), who transferred his family to Padua. His grandson, Lucius Aurelius Cotta was elected prefect of the Reno; the area around the Reno near Bologna. His first and second son and his male grandchildren continued in this position and added the cognomen Reno, becoming Cotta Reno or Cottareno. The last person to register Cottareno was Marcus Aurelius Cottareno in Padua in 290 AD and subsequently the family name was written as Contareno, or Contarini in Venetian (both the Latin and Venetian denomination of the family name have been used interchangeably since).

In 338 AD Marcus Aurelius Contareno (or Marco Aurelio Contarini in Venetian), prefect of Concordia under Constantine I, was the first Contarini to permanently move his residence to the Venetian area. In 425 another Marcus Aurelius Contarini took part in the third Consular Triumvirate of Rialto, following the invasions of the Goths under Alaric I, who from 402 pillaged the rich provinces of Istria and Venetia and sacked Rome in 410. From the outset the affairs of the early exiles in the islands of the Venetian lagoon were managed by Roman Consuls elected at Padua, including the Contarini. Following the invasion by the Huns of Attila in 452 and the destruction of the large Roman cities of Padua and Aquileia, the islands became a more permanent refuge for the swelling number of exiles. In 466 the exiles decided upon a form of self-government through the annual election of Tribunes, who ultimately in 539 came under Byzantine rule through the Exarch of Ravenna, forming a loose association of islands with its capital in Eraclea. According to tradition, in 697 under the guidance of the Patriarch of Grado, twelve Tribunes ruling the Byzantine district of Venice elected the first Doge in Eraclea, forming the independent Republic of Venice. One of these Tribunes was Marcus Aurelius Contarini. Twentieth century studies, however, cast doubt on the historicity of the first Doge Paolo Luccio Anafesto and his successor Doge Marcello Tegalliano, suggesting that only following the murder of the Byzantine viceroy Paul Exarch of Ravenna, did the inhabitants of the islands chose their first Doge, Orso Ipato from Eraclea.

Whoever was historically the first, the Contarini family has since the earliest Venetian chronicles been associated with the birth of the Republic and election of the first Doge. They formed part of the 'duodecim nobiliorum proles Venetiarum' (or the 'twelve noblest families of Venice') and the 12 apostolic families, the oldest of the 247 patrician families in the Great Council following the Serrata of 1297. As the first inhabitants in the lagoon came from what were provinces of Rome in the 5th century, the Rialto initially being governed by a Consular Triumvirate elected at Padua and subsequently by Tribunes who were elected from among the most prominent members in their former Roman communes, it is not uncommon among the oldest Venetian patrician families to find Roman ancestry (e.g. Quirini descended from gens Sulpicii Quirini, Marcello descended from gens Claudii Marcelli), families who often kept their praenomina traditions and preserved their genealogy. The older branch Aurelli Cottae of the gens Aurelia came to prominence with the election of Gaius Aurelius Cotta as consul in 252 BC and again in 248 BC during the First Punic War and by the time Publius Aurelius Cotta moved to Padua four of his patrilineal ancestors, including his father, had achieved consulship in the Roman Republic.

In the Republic of Venice in 1043 Domenico I was elected and became the first Doge in the family Contarini. By 1797, when the last Doge was forced to abdicate, the family had produced eight Doges of their own - the greatest number of Doges in one family. The Contarini count as well 44 Procurators of San Marco, the second most prestigious life appointment after that of the Doge, plus various important ambassadors, diplomats, cardinals and navy commanders among them (in the famous Battle of Lepanto no less than 6 ships were commanded by Contarini). T

=== Surviving branch in Sicily ===
A branch remains in Sicily today. With the arrival of Alvise Contarini in Syracuse at the invitation of Martin I of Sicily this branch of the family was established in Sicily in 1394, the year in which Alvise married Cesarea Modica of Baron Pietro di Modica. Alvise Contarini was given the fiefdoms of San Giacomo Belmineo and Solarino as part of the dowry. In 1406 he was elected mayor of Syracuse, followed by numerous other communal, ministerial and military official positions for his descendants in the Kingdom of Sicily and the Kingdom of Italy after the Risorgimento. In Sicily the family carries the title Duke of Castrofilippo.

== Notable members ==
- Marco Aurelio Contarini, Roman consul elected at Padua, took part in the third Consular Triumvirate of Rialto, from 425 to 426
- Aurelio Contarini, son of Marco Aurelio, moved to the Venetian Lagoons following invasion of Attila and became Tribune of Rialto in 453
- Marco Aurelio Contarini, one of 12 Tribunes who elected the first Doge in 697 at the initiation of the Patriarch of Grado
- Luigi Contarini, Procurator of San Marco in 864
- Antonio Contarini, Procurator of San Marco in 865
- Contarino Contarini, Tribune of Choggia in 880
- Marco Contarini, son of Teodosio, Procurator of San Marco in 899
- Marino Contarini (d. 953), Patriarch of Grado in 919
- Giovanni Contarini, Ambassador to Pope John XII in 959
- Marco Contarini, son of Giovanni, Procurator of San Marco in 991
- Domenico Contarini (d. 1074), Bishop of Olivolo or Rialto from 1044 to 1074
- Domenico I Contarini (d. 1071), 30th Doge of Venice from 1043 to 1071
- Domenico Contarini, son of Giovanni, Bishop of Venice from 1070 to 1091
- Enrico Contarini (d. 1108), Bishop of Castello from 1074 to 1108
- Marco Contarini (d. 1149), son of Giovanni, Procurator of San Marco in 1143
- Bertucci Contarini, captain in the fleet of doge Enrico Dandolo, conquering Zadar in 1202 and Constantinople in 1204 during the Fourth Crusade
- Jacopo Contarini (1194–1280), 47th Doge of Venice from 1275 to 1280
- Marino Contarini (d. 1293), Procurator of San Marco in 1286
- Nicolo Contarini, Procurator of San Marco in 1299
- Alberto Contarini, Procurator of San Marco in 1300
- Nicolo Contarini (d. 1331), Procurator of San Marco in 1326
- Elisabetta Contarini, wife of Doge Francesco Dandolo, dogaressa of Venice from 1328 to 1339
- Stefano Contarini (d. 1352), Procurator of San Marco in 1347
- Zaccaria Contarini, diplomat and Bailo of Constantinople in 1349
- Maffio Contarini, Governor (Provvedittore) of Albania in 1355
- Andrea Contarini (d. 1382), 60th Doge of Venice from 1368 to 1382
- Antonio Contarini (d. 1386), Bishop of Adria from 1384 to 1386
- Lorenzo Contarini, Procurator of San Marco in 1377
- Andrea Contarini (d. 1443), Ambassador in Rome to Pope Gregory XII in 1406, the first Venetian Pope
- Girolamo Contarini, Governor of Verona in 1408
- Antonio Contarini (d. 1441), Governor of Zadar and played an important role in regaining control of Zadar in 1409 from Hungary
- Alvise Contarini, Mayor of Syracuse in 1406
- Luigi (Lodovico) Contarini, senator of the Kingdom of Sicily from 1414
- Andrea Contarini, executed in 1430 by hanging between the two red pillars of the Palazzo Ducale following his failed assassination attempt on Doge Francesco Foscari
- Marino Contarini (d. 1455), Bishop of Kotor in 1430, Bishop of Treviso in 1453
- Stefano Contarini, diplomat and Procurator of San Marco in 1441
- Federico Contarini, diplomat and Procurator of San Marco in 1445
- Nadalino Contarini, Procurator of San Marco in 1459
- Leonardo Contarini, Procurator of San Marco in 1449
- Bartolomeo Contarini (15th century), Governor of the Duchy of Athens on behalf of Francesco I Acciaioli
- Ambrogio Contarini (1429–1499), Ambassador to Sultan of Persia Uzun Hasan from 1473 to 1476
- Maffio Contarini (d. 1460), Patriarch of Venice from 1456 to 1460
- Andrea Contarini, Procurator of San Marco in 1463
- Scipione Contarini, Bishop of Torcello from 1471 to 1485
- Giovanni Matteo Contarini, Governor of Albania in 1466
- Contarina Contarini, wife of Doge Nicolò Marcello, dogaressa of Venice from 1473 to 1474
- Francesco Contarini, Governor of Albania in 1475
- Federico Contarini, Provveditore of the Venetian Navy in 1482
- Gasparo Contarini (1483–1542), diplomat and Bishop of Belluno from 1536 to 1542
- Bertucci Contarini (d. 1490), Procurator of San Marco in 1485
- Girolamo Contarini, Provveditori of the Venetian Navy in 1495
- Pietro Contarini (d. 1495), Venetian governor of Naxos
- Giovanni Matteo Contarini (d. 1507), cartographer who designed the 1506 Contarini–Rosselli map
- Zaccaria Contarini, Ambassador to King Charles VIII of France in 1491
- Lodovico Contarini, Patriarch of Venice in 1508
- Antonio Contarini (d. 1524), Patriarch of Venice from 1508 to 1524
- Bartolomeo Contarini, Ambassador to Ottoman Sultan Selim I in 1517
- Carlo Contarini, Ambassador to Archduke Ferdinand I in 1523
- Bernardo Contarini, Bailo of Nafplio in 1524
- Giovanni Contarini, Provveditori of the Venetian Navy in 1528
- Luigi Contarini, Bailo of Nafplio in 1531
- Paolo and Francesco Contarini, patricians who commissioned the Villa Contarini in Piazzola sul Brenta in 1546
- Giacomo Contarini (1536–1595), Venetian patron and collector of mathematical instruments
- Pietro Contarini (1591–1563), Bishop of Paphos in 1557
- Giulio Contarini (d. 1580), Procurator of San Marco in 1537
- Marc' Antonio Contarini, Ambassador to Holy Roman Emperor Charles V from 1529 to 1533, Ambassador in Rome to Pope Paul III in 1538
- Alessandro Contarini (d. 1553), Procurator of San Marco in 1538
- Tomasso Contarini, Governor of Verona in 1541, Procurator of San Marco in 1557
- Giulio Contarini, Bishop of Belluno from 1542 to 1575
- Pietro Francesco Contarini, Patriarch of Venice from in 1554
- Tomasso Contarini, Procurator of San Marco in 1558
- Tomasso Contarini, Ambassador to Holy Roman Emperor Charles V in 1535 and Procurator of San Marco in 1543
- Francesco Contarini, Ambassador to Pope Paul IV in 1555, Ambassador to Holy Roman Emperor Charles V and Procurator of San Marco in 1556
- Giovanni Contarini (1549–1605), painter of the Venetian School
- Francesco Contarini, Bishop of Paphos in 1562, Bishop of Cyprus in 1570
- Luigi Contarini (d. 1579), Ambassador to the Duke of Ferrara in 1569, Ambassador to King of France in 1577
- Federico Contarini, Procurator of San Marco in 1570
- Leonardo Contarini, Ambassador in Germany in 1571
- Girolamo Contarini, Procurator of San Marco in 1571
- Cecilia Contarini, wife of Doge Sebastiano Venier, admiral of the fleet at the Battle of Lepanto, dogaressa of Venice from 1577 to 1578
- Tomaso Contarini (d. 1617), Governor of Vicenza in 1589, later Ambassador to the Dutch Republic, Ambassador to Holy Roman Emperor Rudolf II, Ambassador to Pope Paul V
- Zaccaria Contarini, Ambassador to Pope Gregory XIV in 1590, Ambassador to Pope Clement VIII in 1596, Procurator of San Marco in 1599
- Giovanni Paolo Contarini, Procurator of San Marco in 1594
- Tommaso Contarini, Archbishop of Candia from 1597 to 1604
- Girolamo Contarini, Bishop of Capo d'Istria from 1600 to 1619
- Bernardo Contarini, Procurator of San Marco in 1602
- Piero Contarini, Ambassador to Charles Emmanuel I, Duke of Savoy in 1606
- Tomaso Contarini, Ambassador to Pope Paul V in 1612
- Piero Contarini, Ambassador to Holy Roman Emperor Rudolf II in 1606, Ambassador to Pope Paul V, Ambassador to King James I of England in 1617
- Simone Contarini, Bailo of Constantinople in 1608, Ambassador to King Louis XIII of France in 1617, Ambassador to Holy Roman Emperor Ferdinand II in 1619, Procurator of San Marco in 1620, Ambassador to King Philip IV of Spain in 1621, Ambassador to Sultan Mustafa I in 1622, Ambassador to King Louis XIII of France in 1625
- Gasparo Contarini, Ambassador to the Dutch Republic in 1608
- Alvise Contarini, Ambassador to Pope Paul V in 1613
- Francesco Contarini (1556–1624), 95th Doge of Venice from 1623 to 1624
- Angelo Contarini (d. 1657), Ambassador to King Charles I of England in 1625, Ambassador to Pope Urban VIII in 1629, Ambassador to the Holy Roman Emperor Ferdinand III in 1637, Ambassador to Louis XIII of France in 1638, Ambassador to Pope Urban VIII in 1640, Procurator of San Marco in 1642, Ambassador to Pope Urban VIII in 1642, Ambassador to Pope Innocent X in 1646
- Alvise Contarini (1597–1651), Ambassador to King Charles I of England in 1627, Ambassador to King Louis XIII of France, Ambassador to Pope Urban VIII in 1632, Bailo of Constantinople in 1636, mediator in Congress of Munster from 1641 until signing of Peace of Westphalia in 1648
- Nicolò Contarini (1553–1631), 97th Doge of Venice from 1630 to 1631
- Giorgio Contarini, Governor of Vicenza in 1638
- Andrea Contarini, son of Doge Carlo Contarini, Procurator of San Marco in 1645, Ambassador to King John II Casimir Vasa of Poland in 1649, Ambassador to Pope Clement IX in 1667 and to Pope Clement X in 1670
- Tomaso Contarini, Provveditore of Dalmatia in 1647
- Angelo Contarini, Governor of Verona in 1649
- Giulio Contarini, Procurator of San Marco in 1651
- Francesco Contarini, Governor of Verona in 1651
- Vicenzo Contarini, Ambassador to England (Council of State) in 1653
- Giacomo Contarini, Governor of Verona in 1653
- Carlo Contarini (1580–1656), 100th Doge of Venice from 1655 to 1656
- Girolamo Contarini, Captain of galleon in 1657, Provveditore of Dalmatia and Albania in 1667
- Domenico II Contarini (1585–1675), 104th Doge of Venice from 1659 to 1675
- Marco Contarini (d. 1689), Procurator of San Marco in 1662
- Carlo Contarini, Ambassador to King Charles II of Spain
- Alvise Contarini (1601–1684), 106th Doge of Venice from 1676 to 1684
- Domenico Contarini, Ambassador to Holy Roman Emperor Leopold I
- Carlo Contarini, Procurator of San Marco in 1685
- Pietro Contarini, Procurator of San Marco in 1701
- Girolamo Contarini, Provveditore of Corfu in 1701
- Luigi Contarini, Procurator of San Marco 1703
- Antonio Contarini, Governor of Verona in 1713
- Polissena Contarini da Mula, wife of Doge Alvise Giovanni Mocenigo, dogaressa of Venice from 1771 to 1778
- Count Nicolò Bertucci Contarini (1780–1849), naturalist
- Luigi Filippo Contarini (1841–1908), mayor of Agrigento and senator for life, Kingdom of Sicily
Other palaces built for the Contarini family in Venice

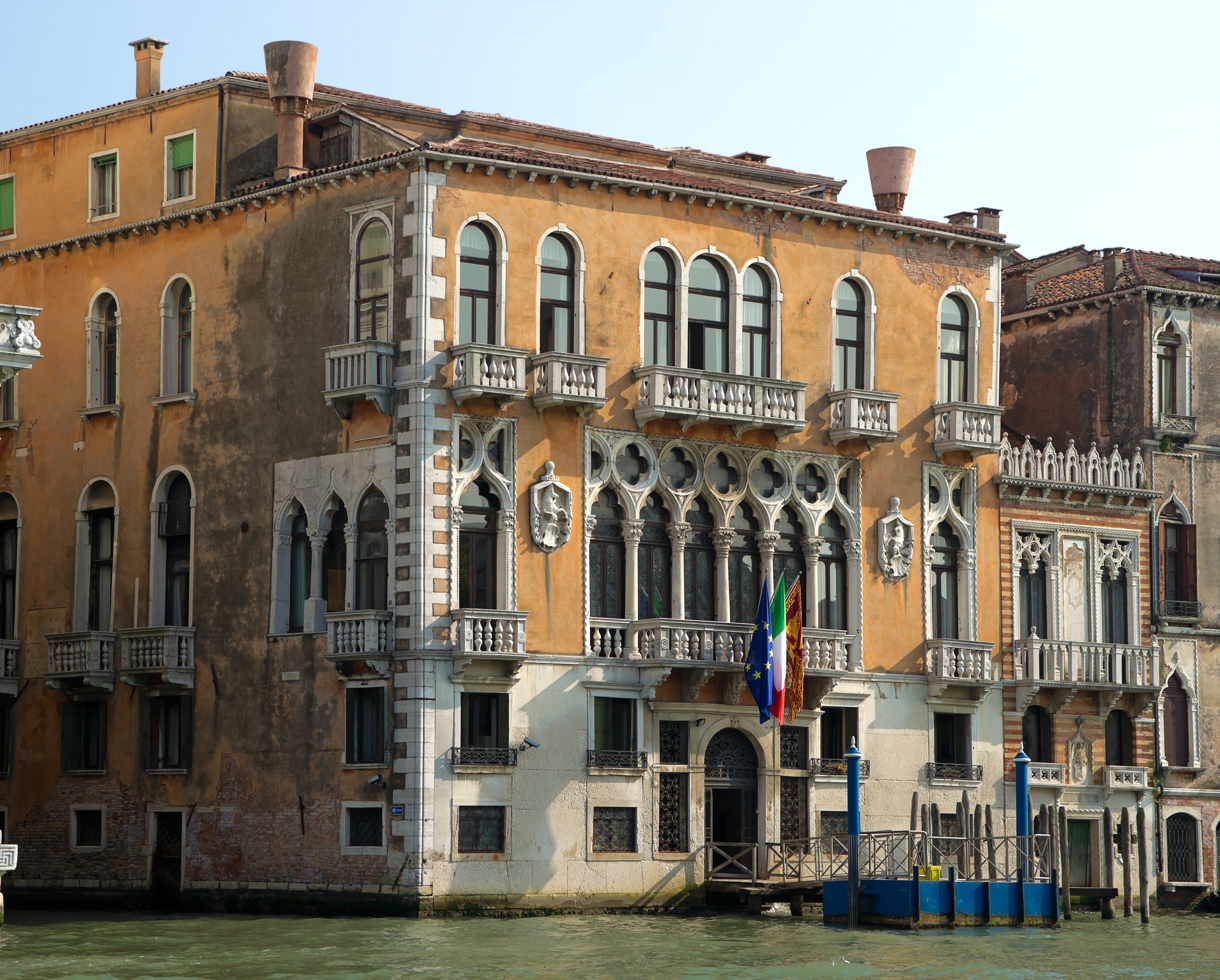
Palazzo Corner Contarini dei Cavalli

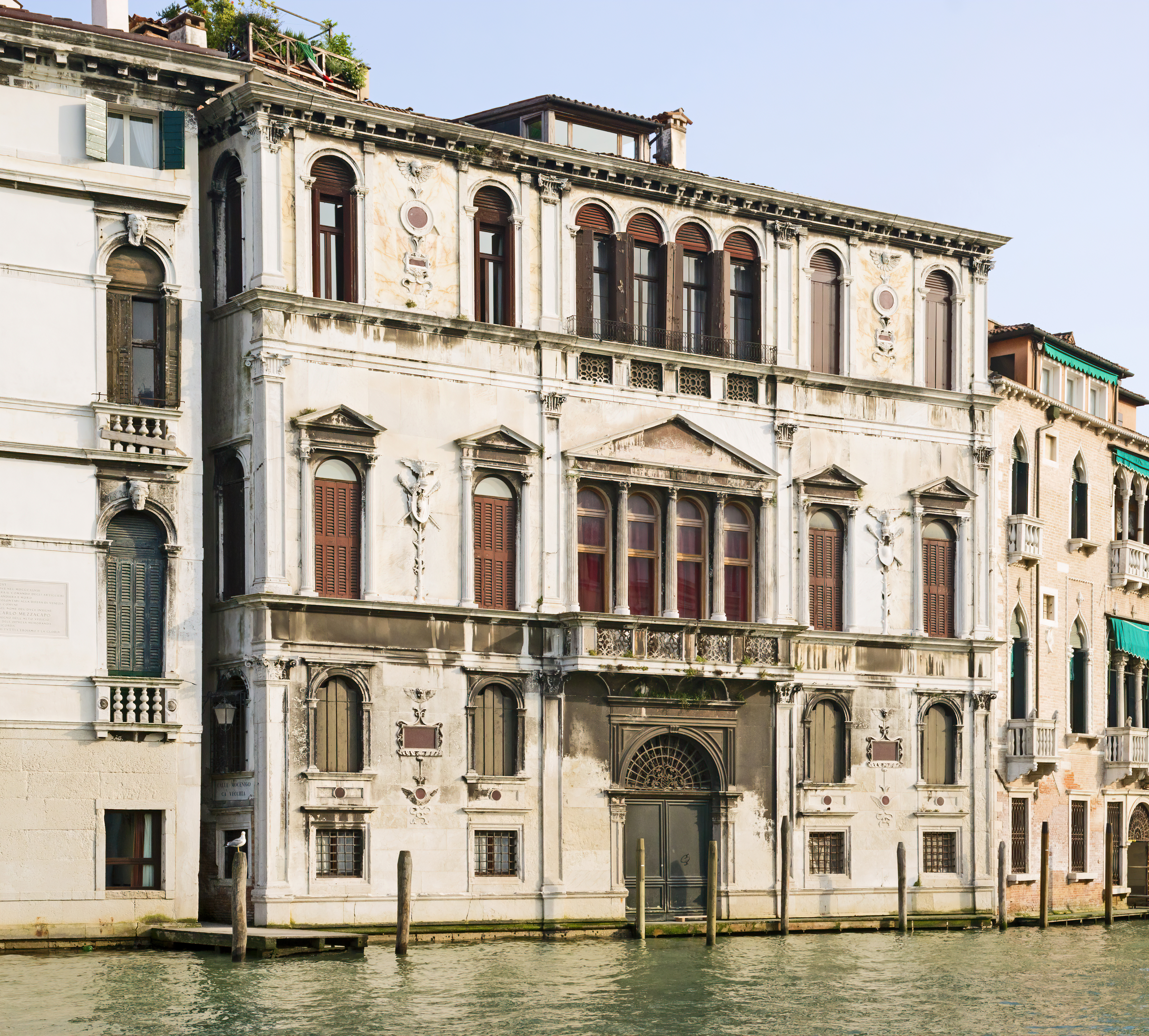
Palazzo Contarini delle Figure

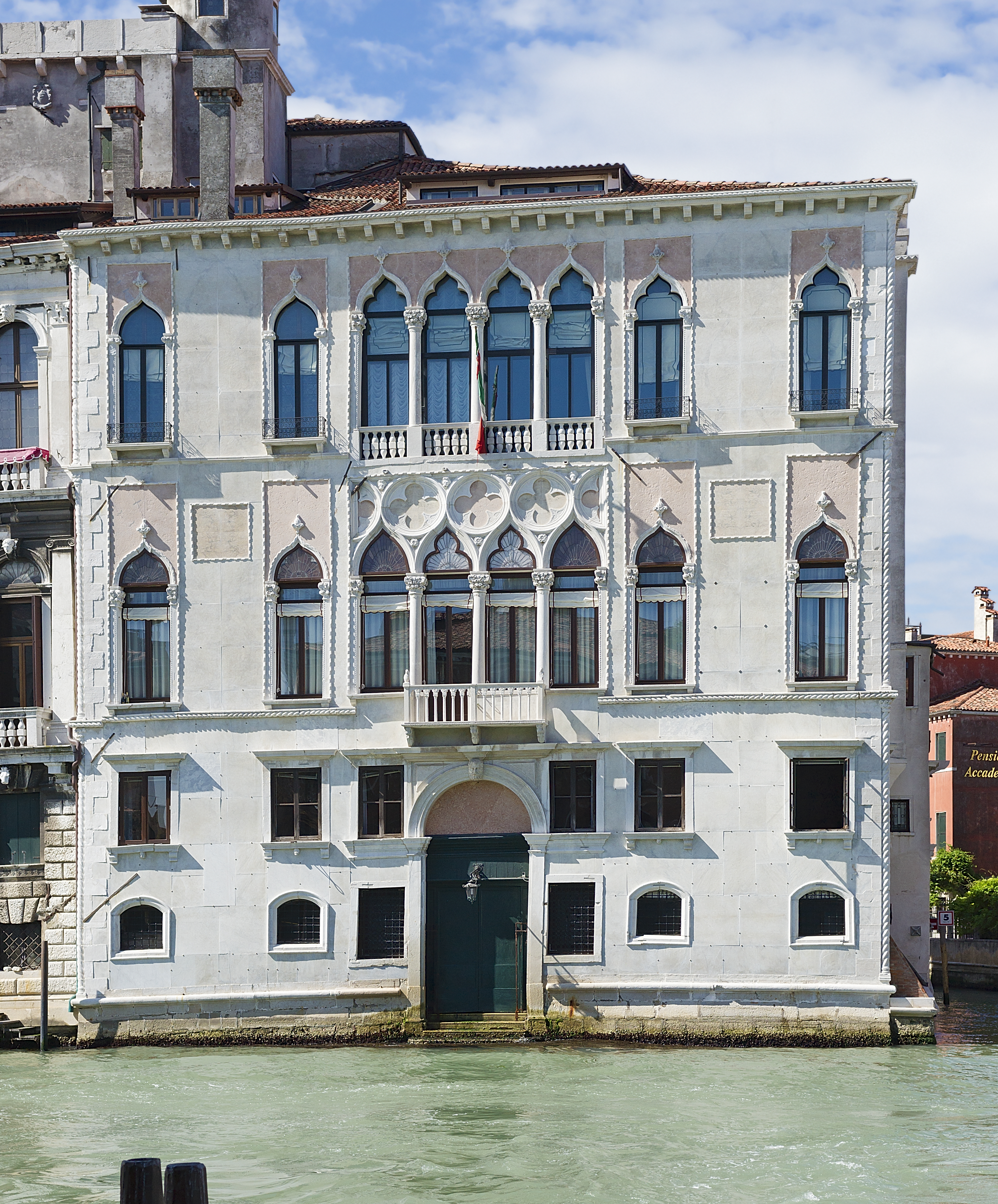
Palazzo Contarini Corfù

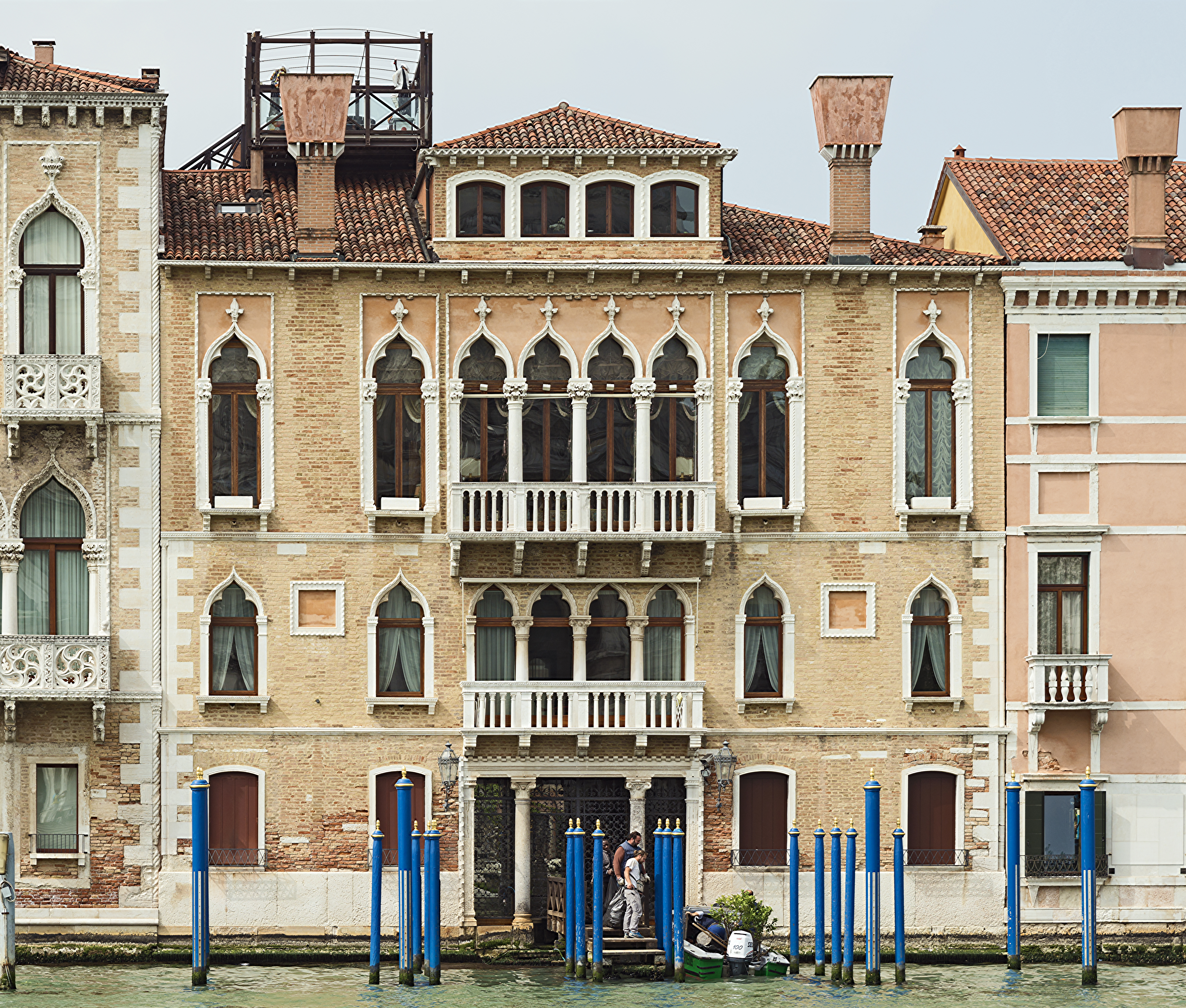
Palazzo Venier Contarini

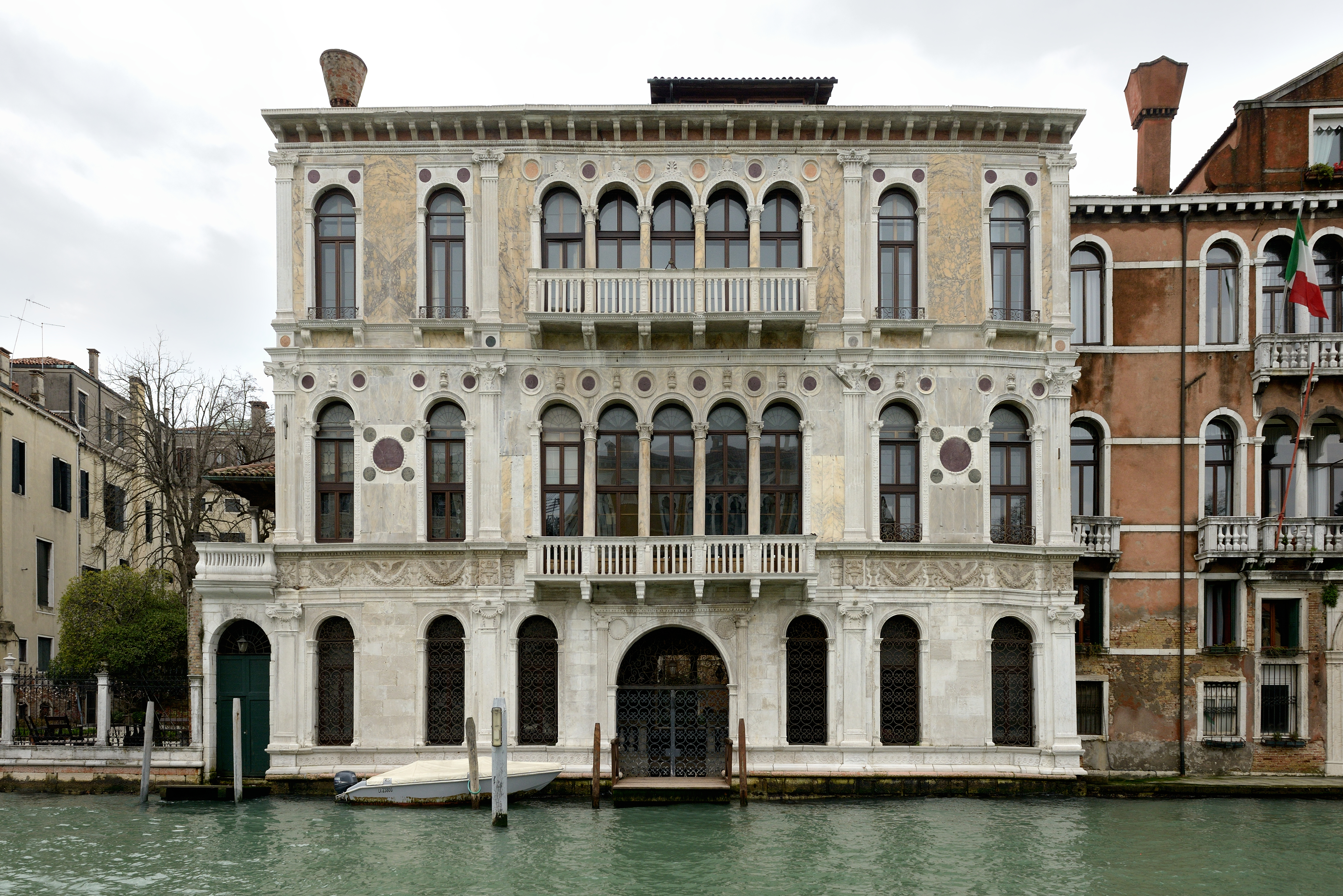
Palazzo Contarini Polignac

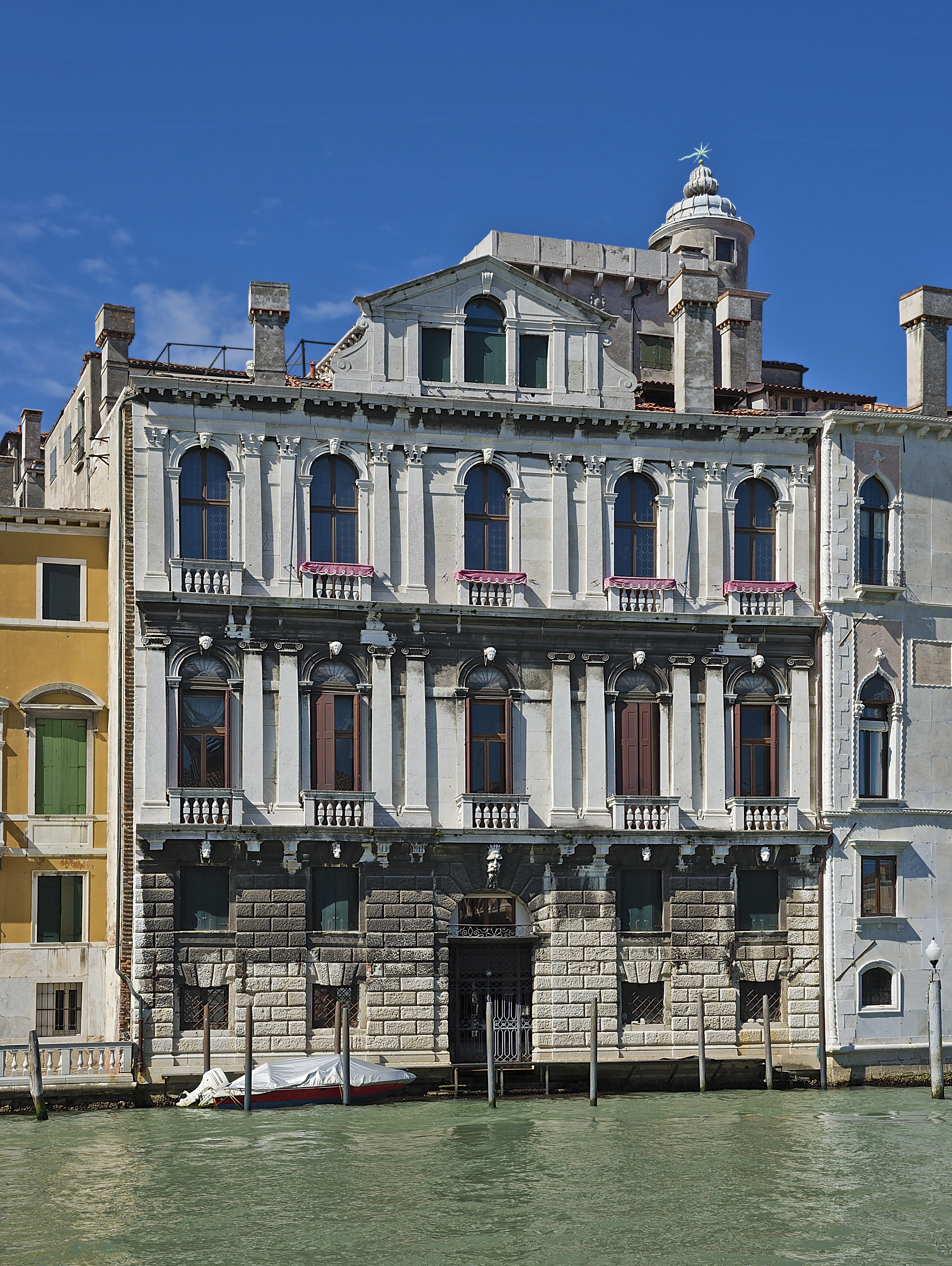
Palazzo Contarini degli Scrigni

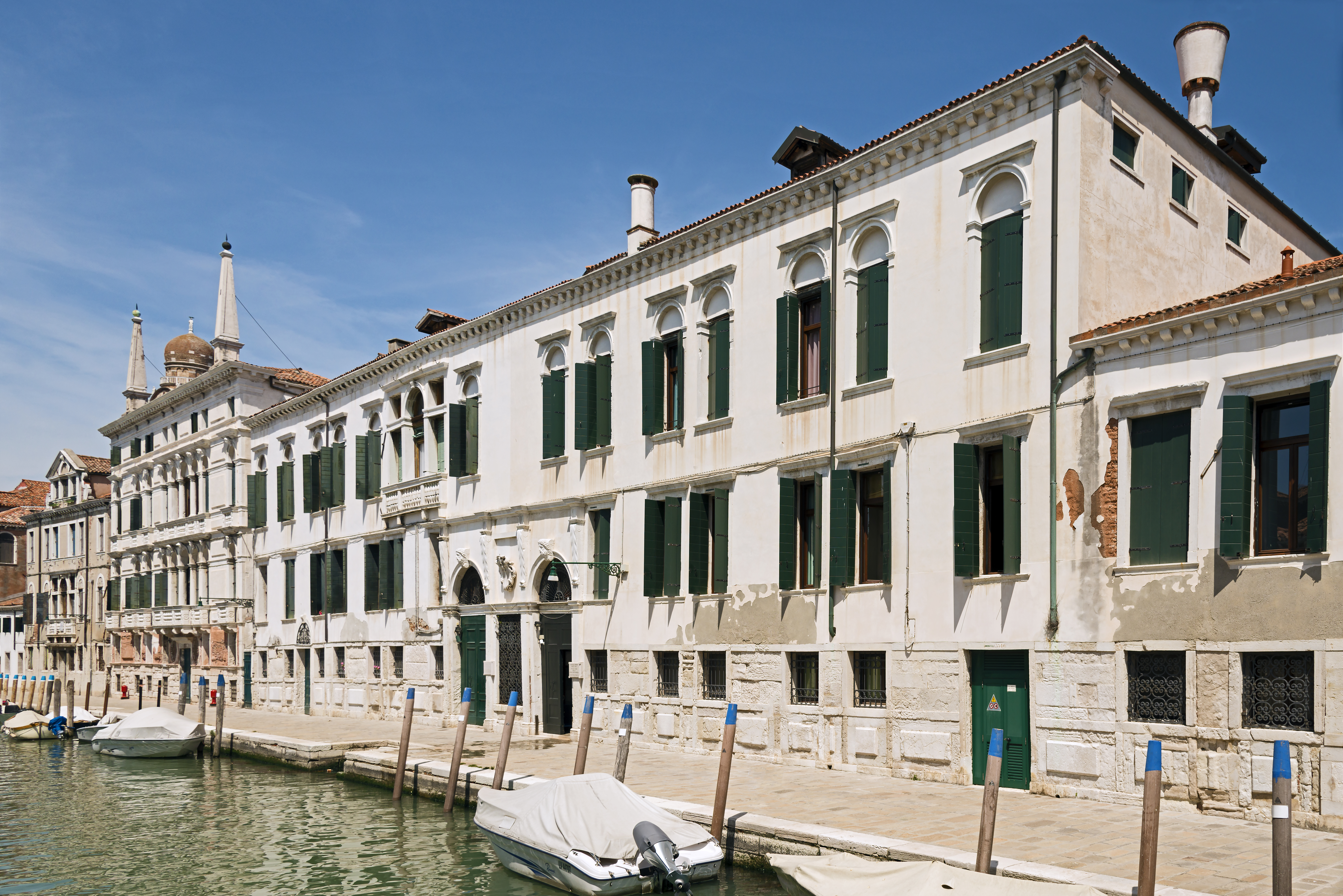
Palazzo Contarini dal Zaffo

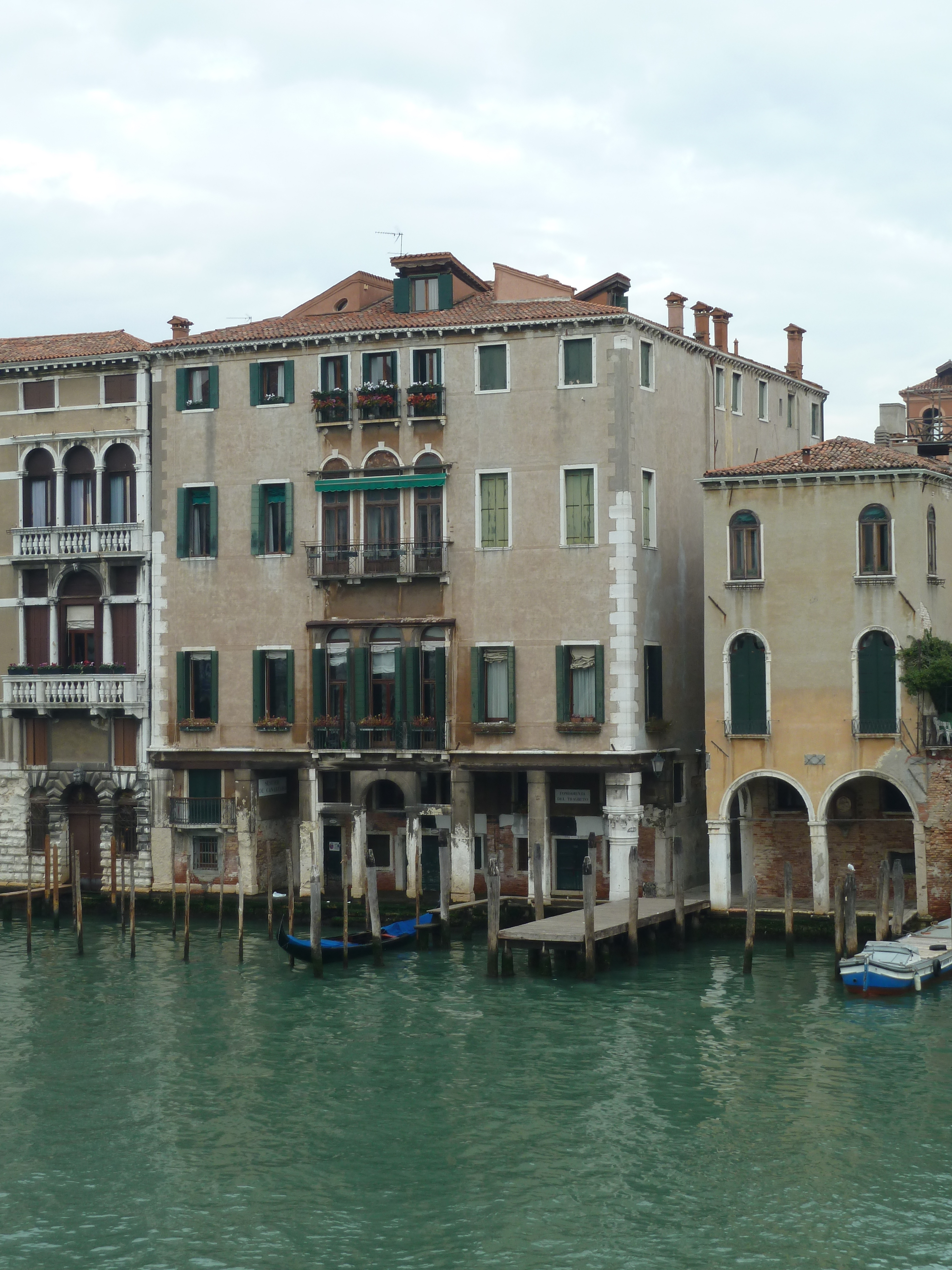
Palazzo Contarini Pisani

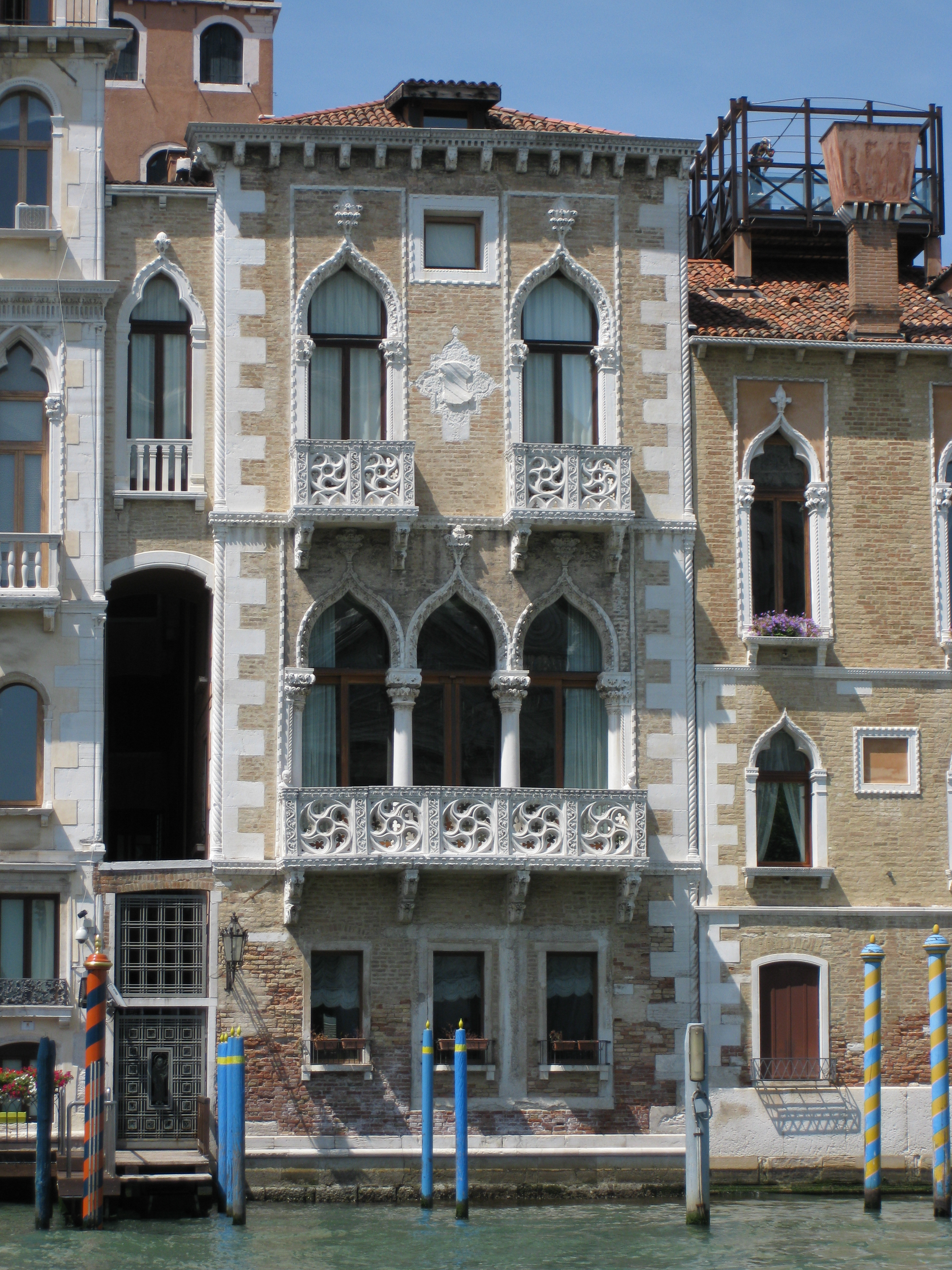
Palazzo Contarini Fasan

== See also ==
- Ca' d'Oro, Venice
- Palazzo Correr Contarini Zorzi
- Palazzo Contarini del Bovolo, Venice
- Villa Contarini in Piazzola sul Brenta
- Contarini Fleming, a novel by the British prime minister Benjamin Disraeli
