= Henry III Received at the Villa Contarini =

Painting by Giovanni Battista Tiepolo

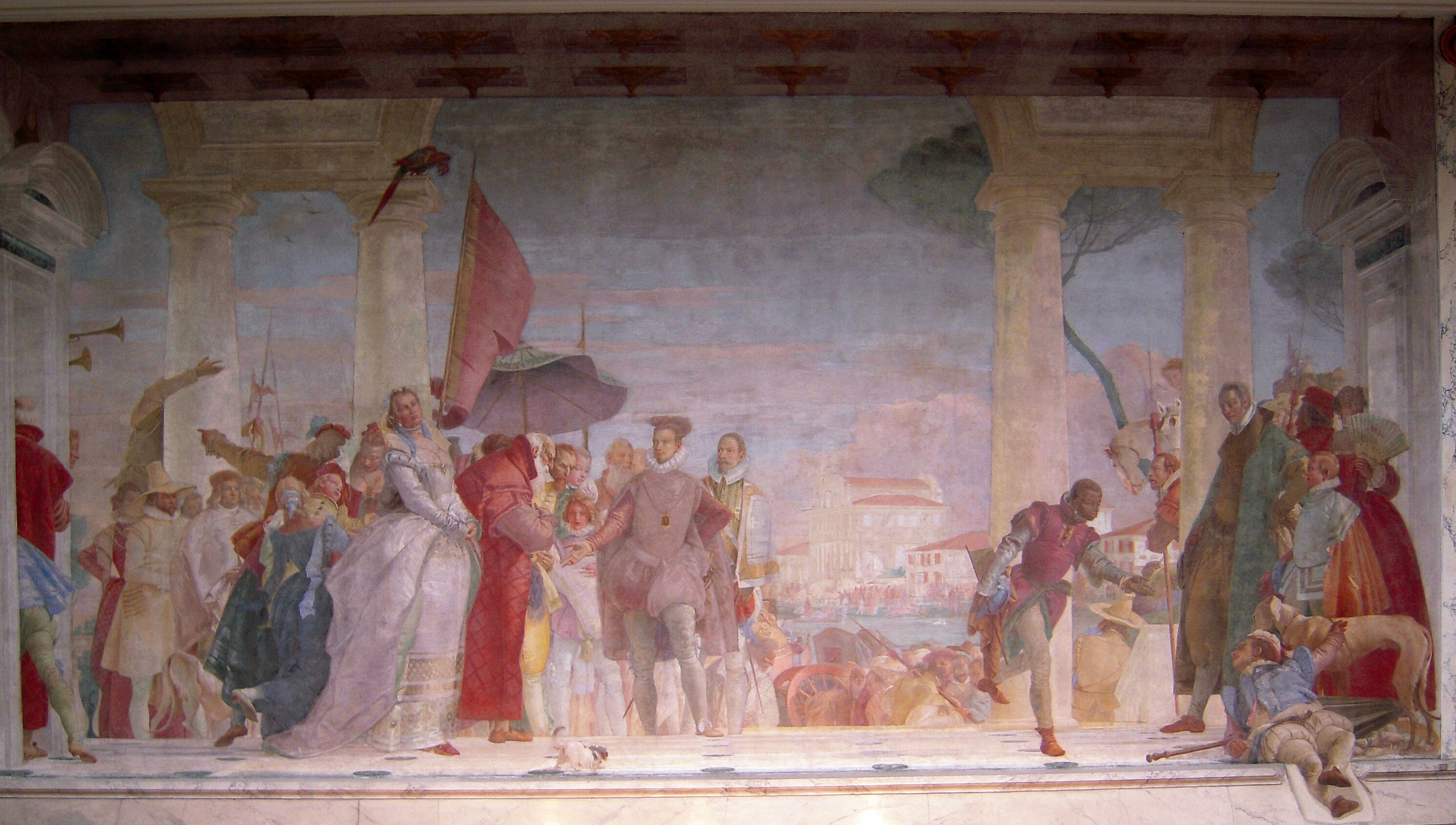
Henry III Received at the Villa Contarini (1750)

Henry III Received at the Villa Contarini or Henry III's Visit to the Villa Contarini is a 1750 fresco by Giovanni Battista Tiepolo, now in the Musée Jacquemart-André in Paris. It shows Henry III of France visiting the Italian Contarini family in 1574.

== Description ==
This is a historical genre painting. It represents the visit made by Henry III of France, son of Henry II and his wife Catherine de Medici, to the noble Italian family of Contarini in the year 1574. Tiepolo depicts the meeting between the residents of the villa and the king, accompanied by his retinue, within the framework of a spacious and elegant gallery. The scene is framed in painted architectures, with arcades and columns. A master in the art of giving life to scenes of great theatricality and in that of trompe-l'oeil, Tiepolo entrusts the young man seated in the foreground with the mission of creating a shift effect in perspective, thanks to his pose which, throwing his body backwards, lets his legs hang beyond the pictorial frame.

Here Tiepolo recreates an aristocratic world, whose aesthetic recalls - and continues - that of Veronese.
