= Palazzo Contarini del Bovolo =

Small palazzo in Venice, Italy

Coordinates: 45.4347°N 12.3344°E

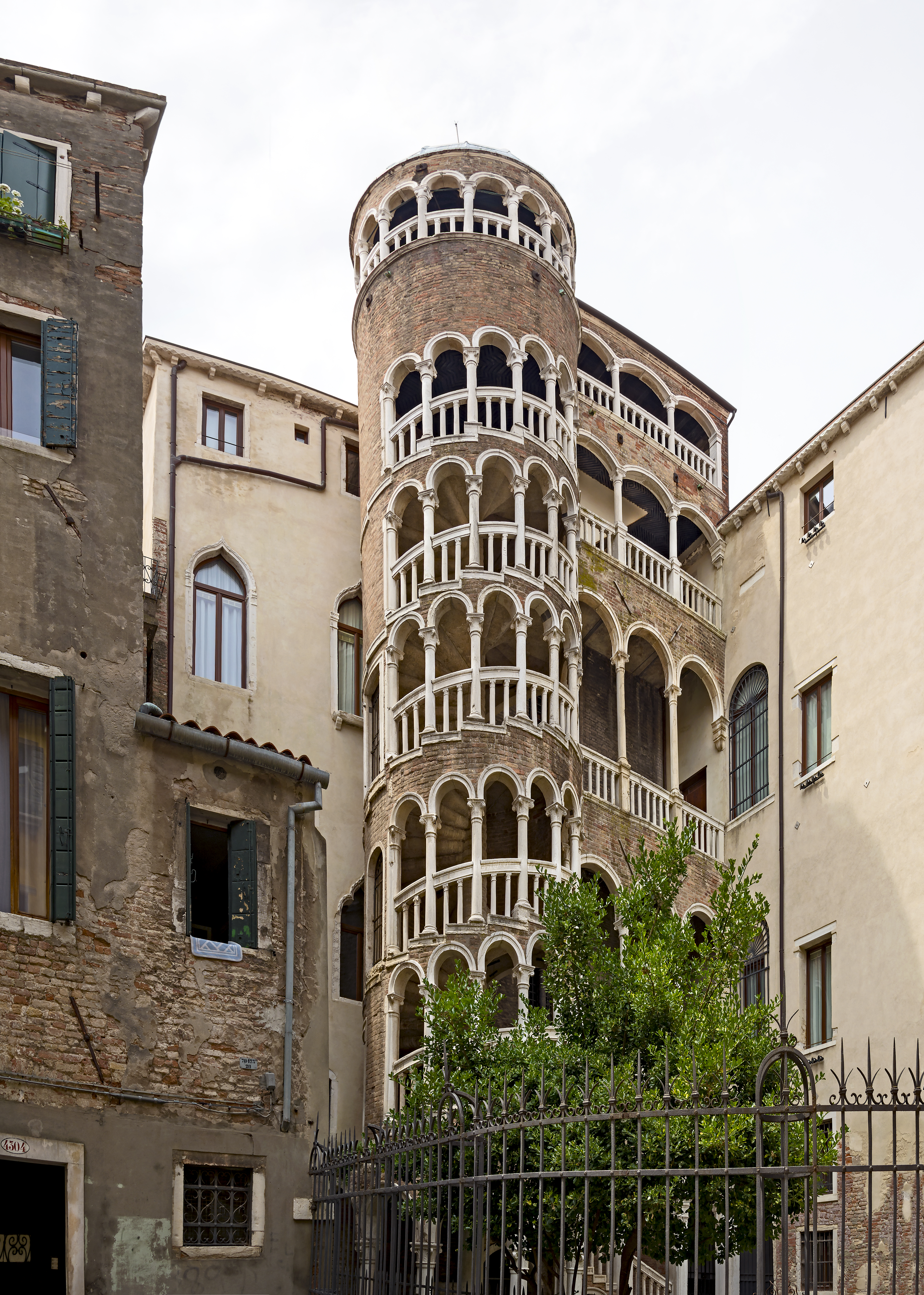
View of the famous staircase

The Palazzo Contarini del Bovolo (also called the Palazzo Contarini Minelli dal Bovolo) is a small palazzo in Venice, Italy, best known for its external multi-arch spiral staircase known as the Scala Contarini del Bovolo (literally, "of the snail").

The palazzo is located in a small, less-travelled calle (street) near Campo Manin, about half-way between Campo San Bartolo, at the foot of the Rialto, and Campo Santo Stefano.

The staircase leads to an arcade, providing an impressive view of the city roof-tops.

This palazzo has been visitable since February 2016.

== History ==
The palazzo was designed and built in its current form in the 15th century by the architect Giovanni Candi as one of the city residences of the Contarini family. Giorgio Spavento is believed to have been responsible for the addition of the grand spiral staircase on the exterior in 1499.

The Palazzo del Bovolo was chosen by Orson Welles as one of the main locations (Brabantio's house) for his 1952 adaptation of Shakespeare's Othello, and the staircase is prominently featured in the film.

The staircase was closed to the public for restoration work which began in August 2015 but is now open.
