= Palazzo Contarini Fasan =

Building in Venice, Italy

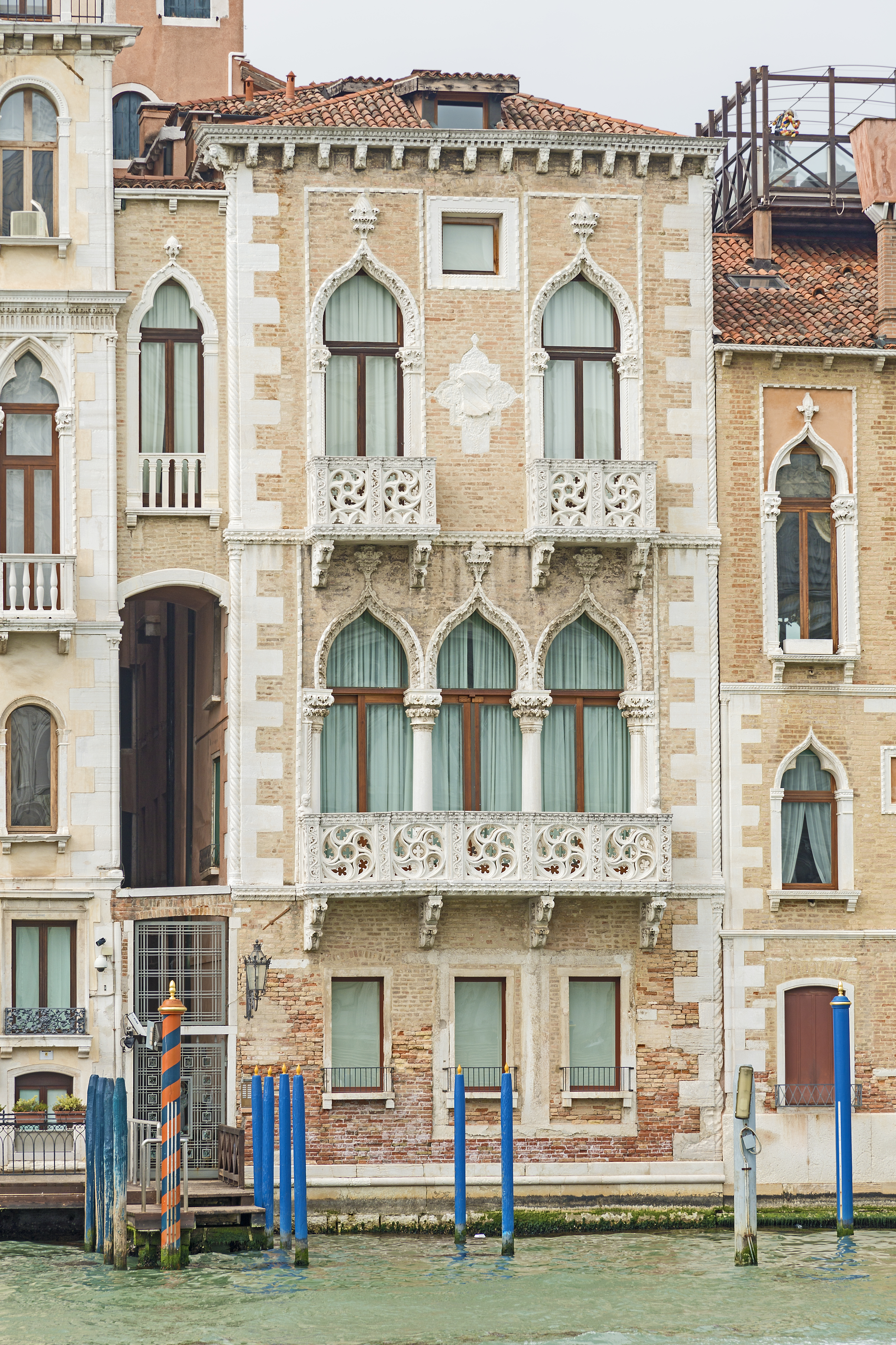
- Palazzo Contarini Fasan
- Interactive map of the Palazzo Contarini Fasan area

General information
- Type: Residential
- Architectural style: Gothic
- Location: San Marco district, Venice, Italy
- Coordinates: 45°25′54.31″N 12°20′03.37″E
- Construction stopped: 15th century

Technical details
- Floor count: 3 levels

Palazzo Contarini Fasan is a small Gothic palace in Venice, Italy, located in the San Marco district and overlooking the Grand Canal. The palazzo is also called the House of Desdemona. Palazzo Venier Contarini is on the right side.

== History ==
Palazzo Contarini Fasan is a peculiar structure built in the 15th century and once owned by the Contarini family. Over the centuries, the palazzo has attracted substantial attention as a home of Desdemona, a character from Shakespeare's Othello.

According to a legend, Nicola Contarini, a famous heroic leader in the wars against the Turks in the 1500s, once lived in the palazzo. He was said to have had the very dark skin so as to be nicknamed "Moor". Contarini's wife, Palma Querini was exhausted by the brutal jealousy of her husband, so she returned to her family. Another legend says that Shakespeare's Othello in fact was modeled after Cristoforo Moro (hence the nickname "the Moor"). Moro was Admiral of the Venetian fleet. In 1515, he married a daughter of Donato from Lezze, nicknamed "White Devil" (hence the name "Desdemona"). In 1508, Moro lost his wife while travelling to Crete under dubious circumstances.

== Architecture ==
The palazzo is a narrow building with a high façade. The window layout is typical for the Venetian Gothic architecture and consists of three levels. In the ground floor, there are three small rectangular windows (there is no access to the water); on the first noble floor there is a trifora with balcony with openings supported by small columns of white stone. The second noble floor has two monoforas. Between them, under a small square opening, there is a large bas-relief coat of arms of the Contarini family.

The top of the façade terminates with a dentilled cornice with the 15th-century frescoes that once embellished the surface. On the left side, an overpass connects the building with the adjacent structure. The overpass has a single-light window, similar to those on the facade.

The renowned art historian John Ruskin wrote in his The Seven Lamps of Architecture that the palazzo was "the most elaborate piece of architecture in Venice."

== Gallery ==
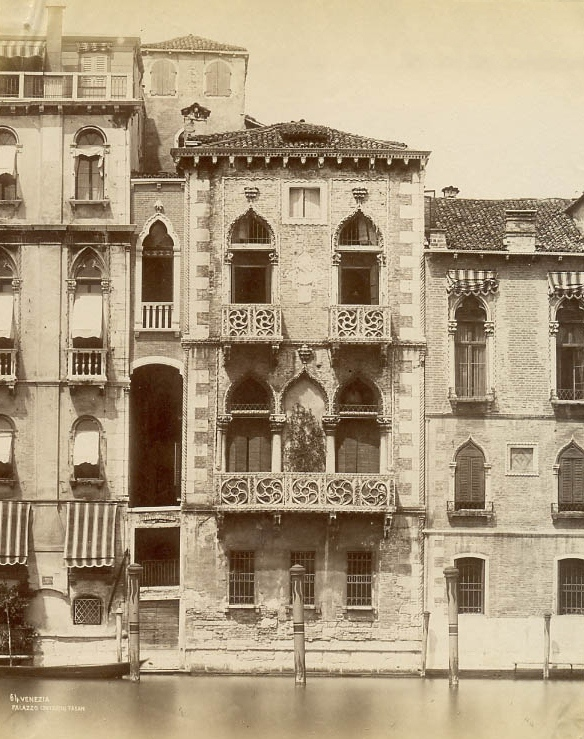
Photo by Carlo Naya (1870s)

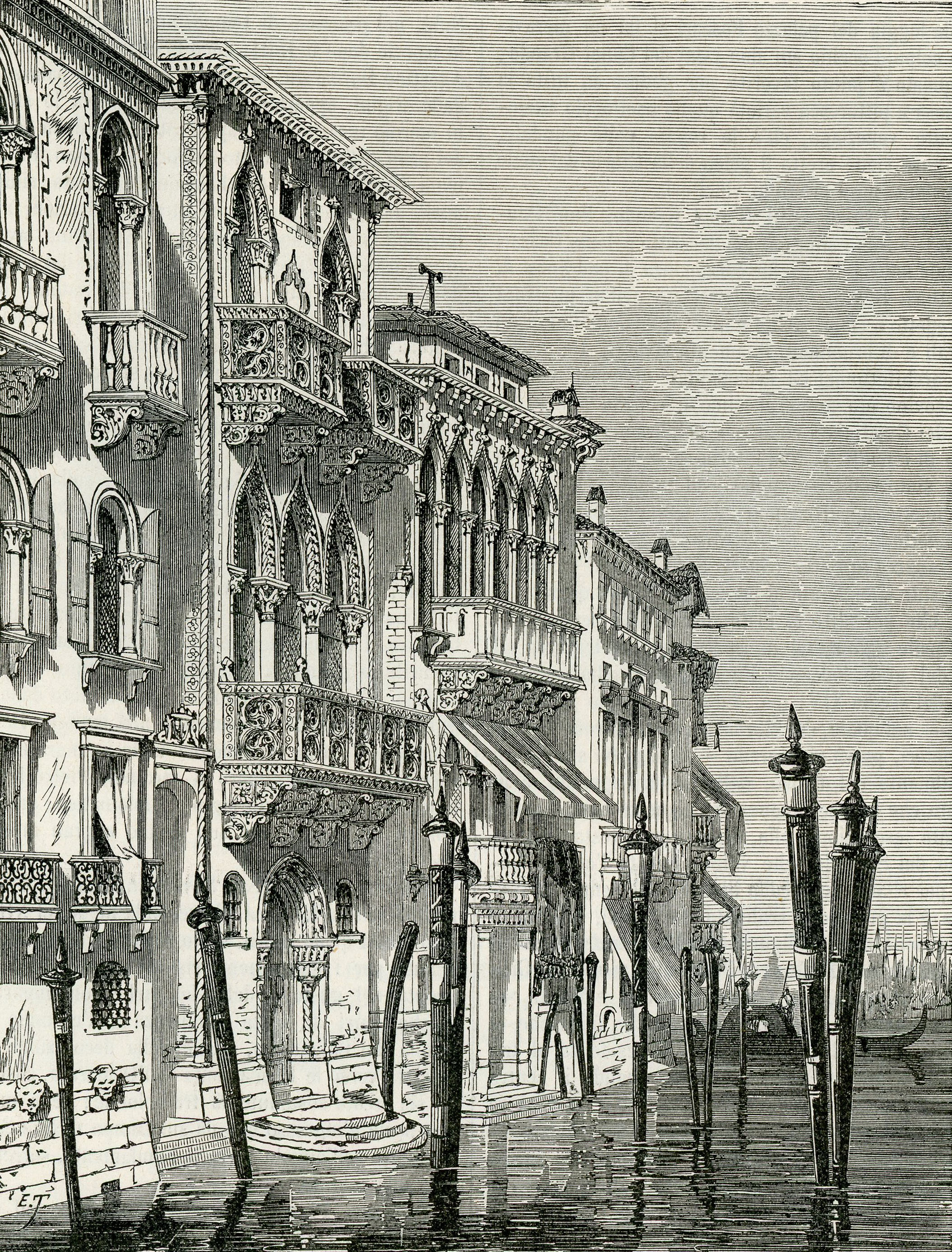
From La patria, geografia dell’Italia by Gustavo Strafforello (1902)

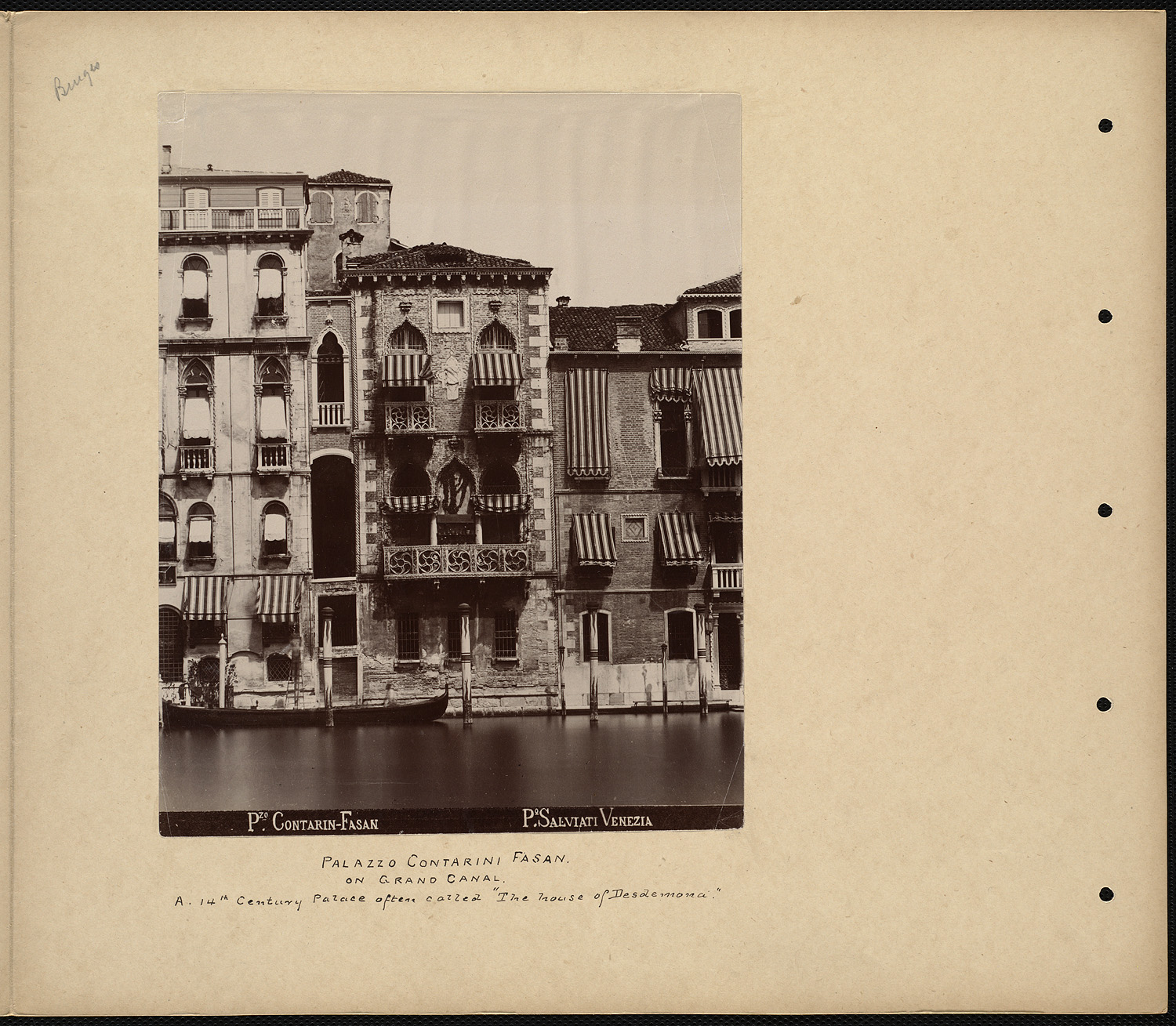
Photo by Paolo Salviati

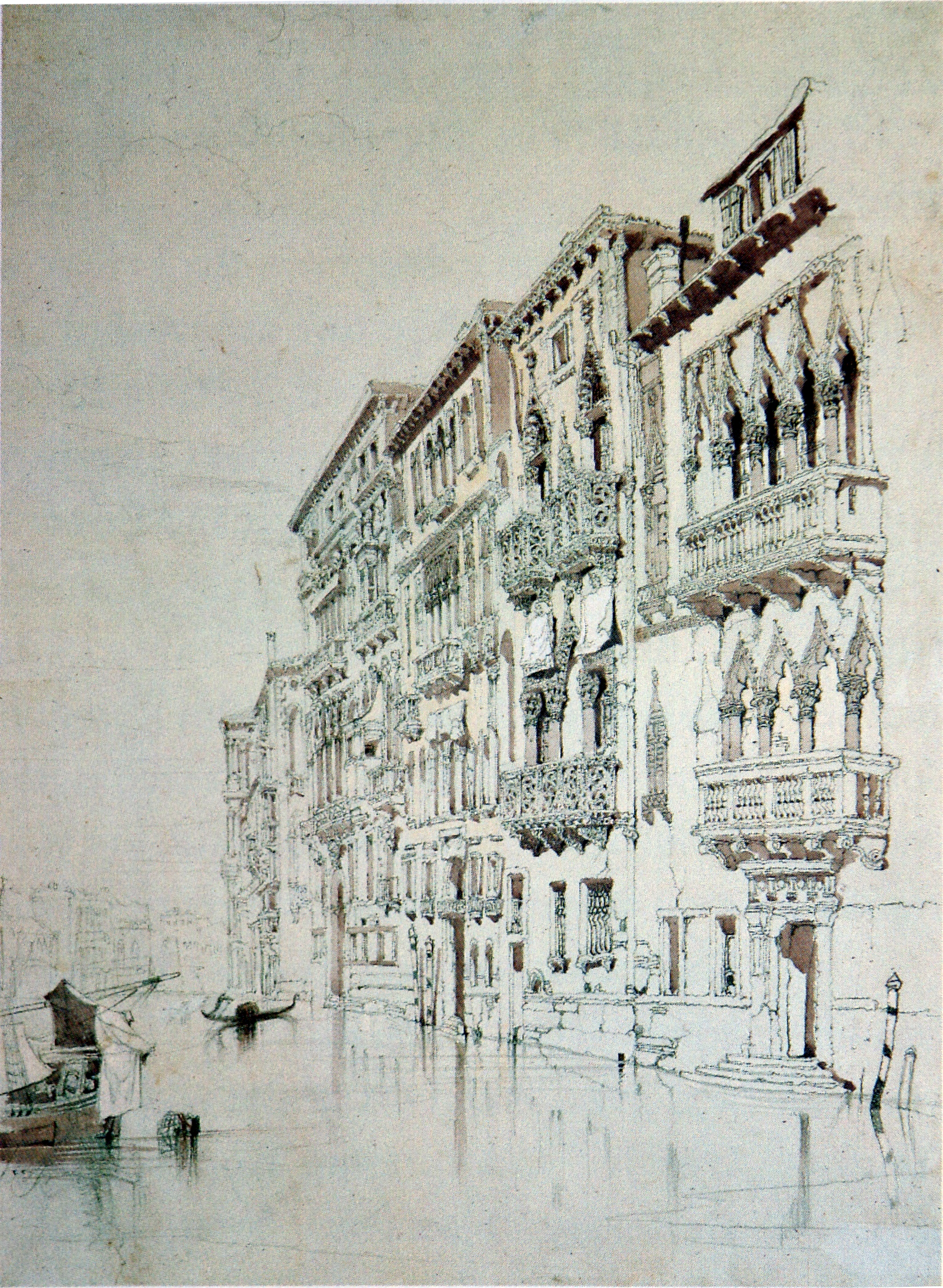
From Ruskin, Turner and the Pre-Raphaelites by Robert Hewison (2000)

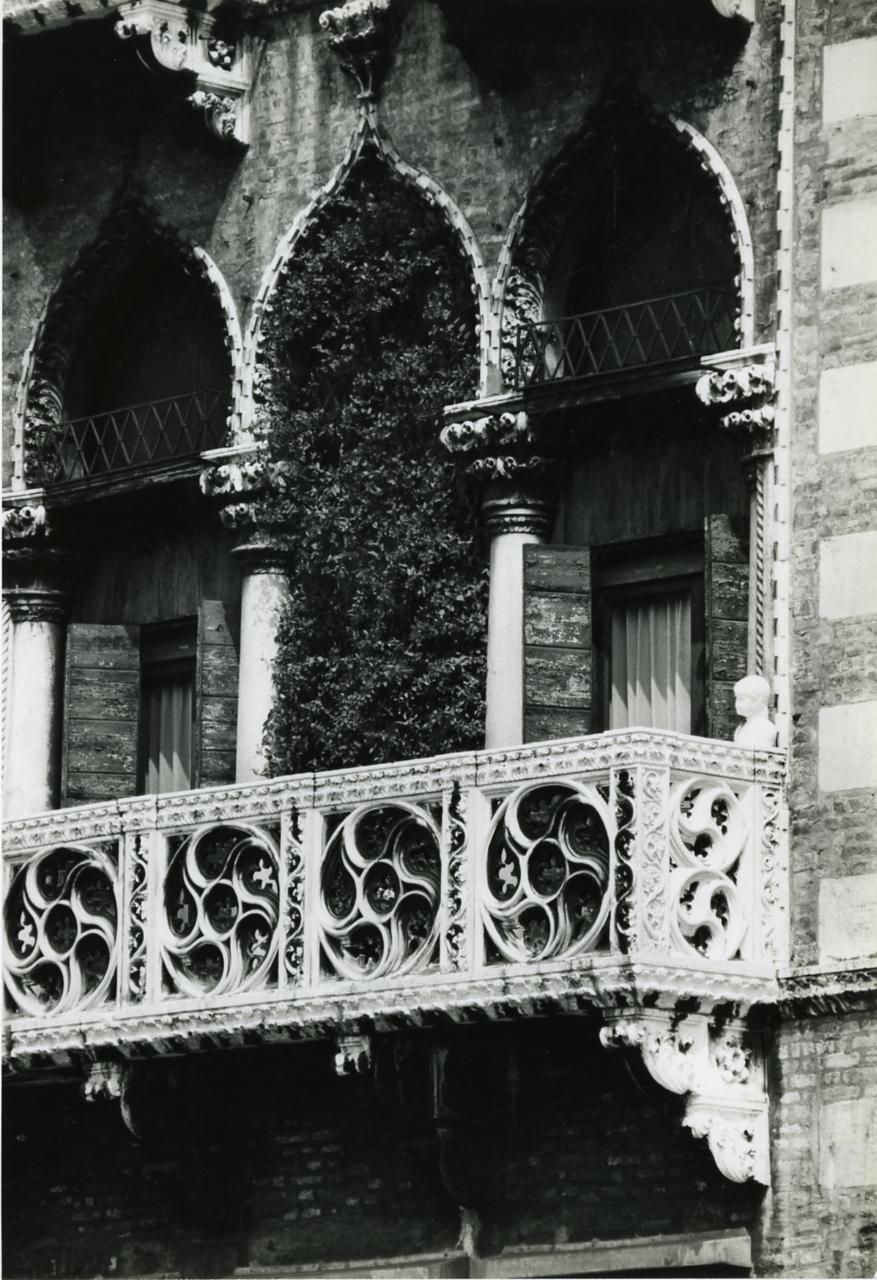
Balcony, photo by Paolo Monti (1969)

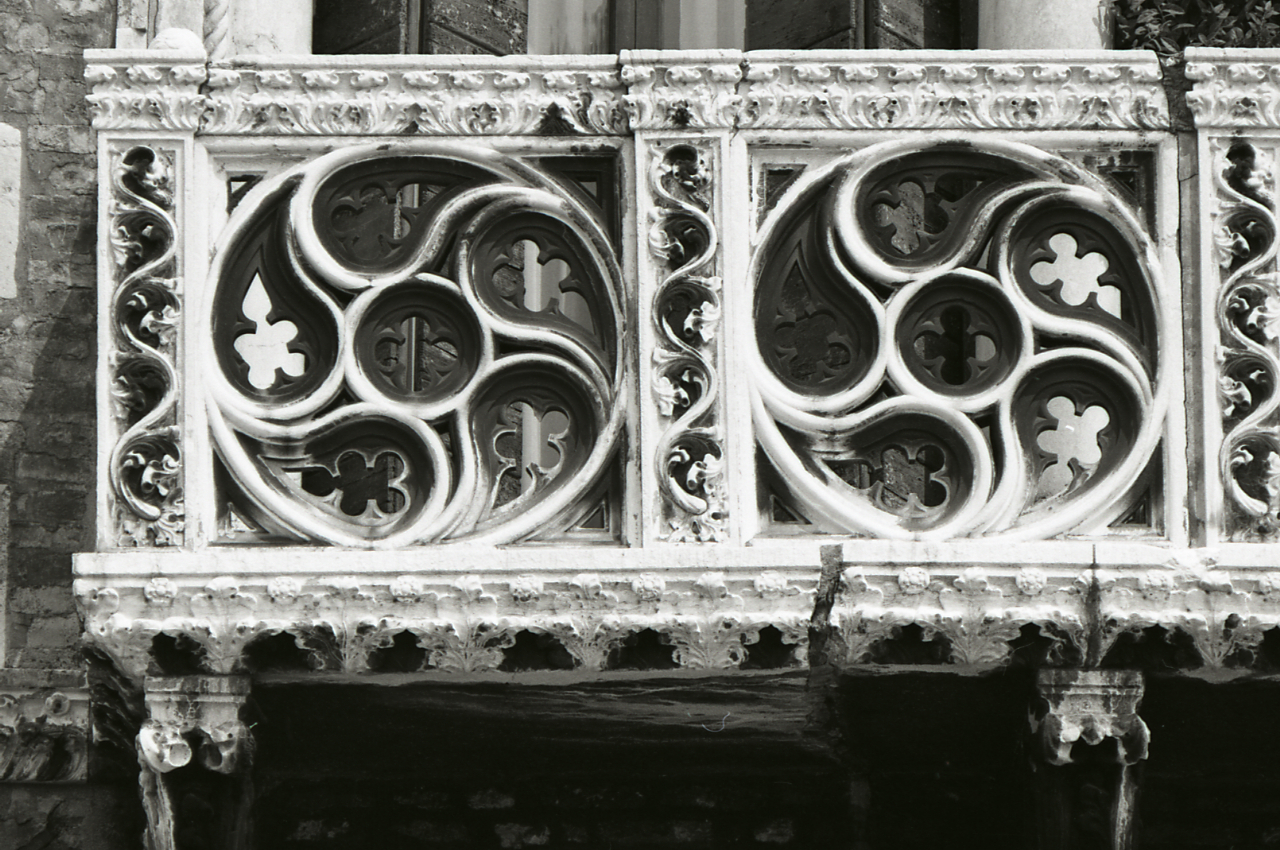
Balcony details, photo by Paolo Monti (1969)
