= Palazzo Venier Contarini =

Building in Venice, Italy

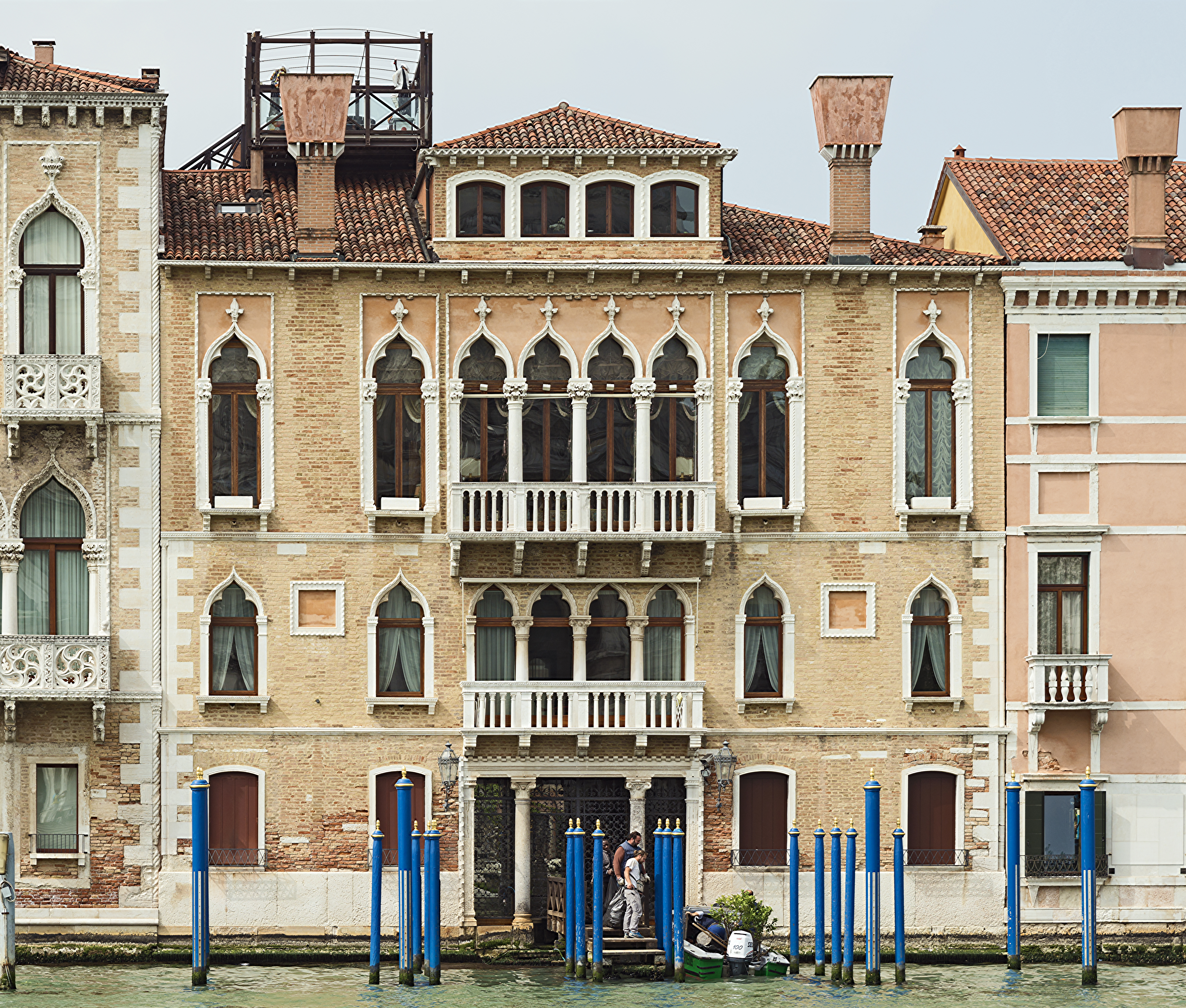
- Palazzo Venier Contarini
- Interactive map of the Palazzo Venier Contarini area

General information
- Type: Residential
- Architectural style: Gothic
- Location: Sestiere San Marco, Venice, Italy
- Coordinates: 45°25′54.52″N 12°20′03.97″E
- Construction stopped: mid-15th century

Technical details
- Floor count: 3

Palazzo Venier Contarini is a Gothic palace located in Venice, Italy, in the Sestiere San Marco and overlooking the Grand Canal. The palazzo is situated next to Palazzo Contarini Fasan.

== History ==
The palazzo was erected in the mid-15th century by the wealthy Venier family from which hails Doge of Venice Sebastiano Venier.

== Architecture ==
The structure has three levels. The ground floor has a water portal with dentiled frame and two columns. Two noble floors each features a central quadrifora flanked by pairs of lancet windows. The quadriforas are decorated with projecting balconies. Above the cornice there are four large dormer windows.

== See also ==
- Palazzo Contarini Pisani
- Palazzo Contarini Polignac
- Palazzo Contarini dal Zaffo
