= Diocese of Paphos =

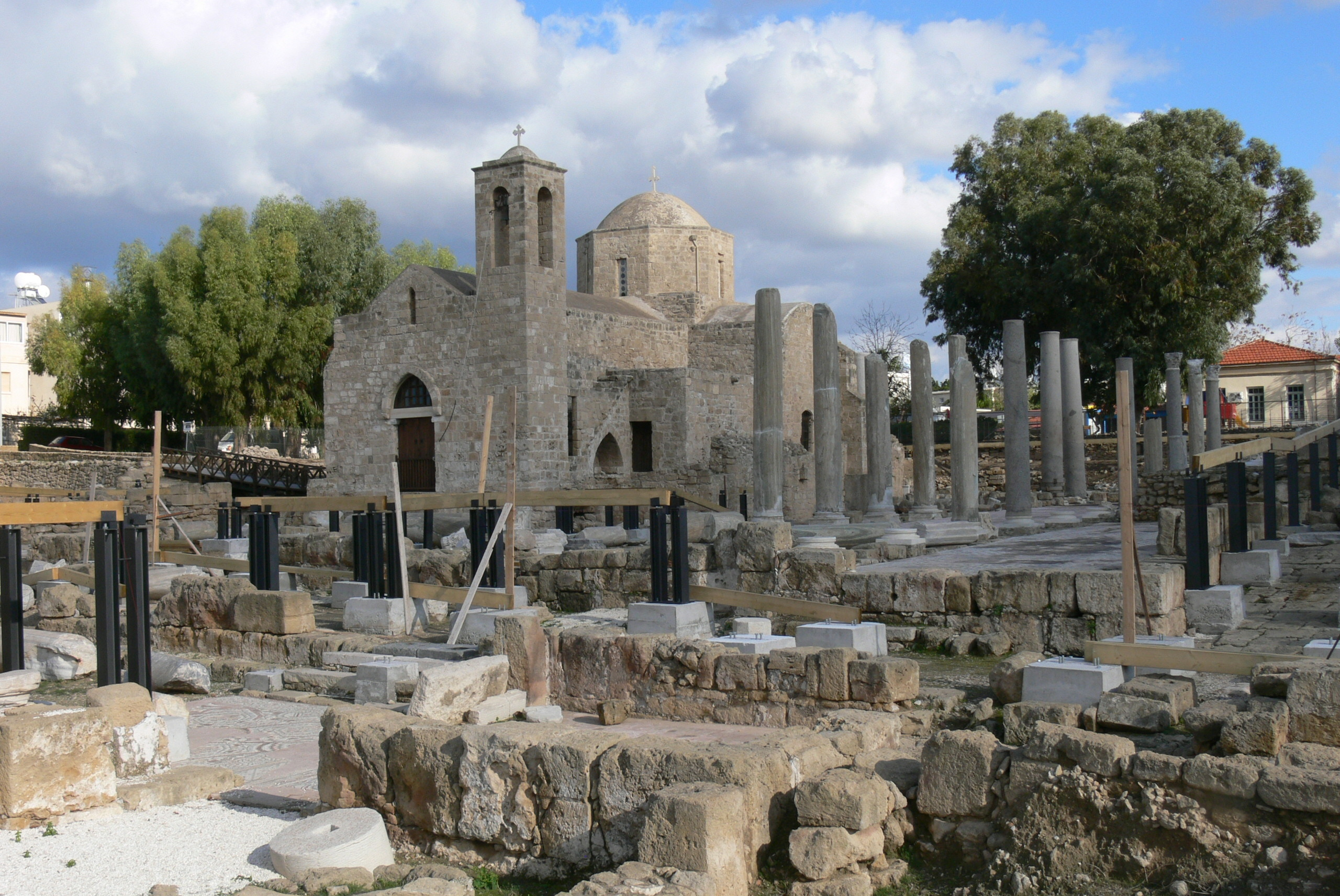
The Byzantine church in Paphos

The Diocese of Paphos (Latin: Dioecesis Paphensis) was a Roman Catholic diocese in the city of Paphos, on the island of Cyprus. It was erected in 1196 and suppressed in 1570 after the Ottoman conquest of Cyprus in 1570.

== Ordinaries ==
- James of Portugal (18 Jun 1457 – 27 Aug 1459, died in office)
- Guillaume Gonème, O.S.A. (13 May 1471 – Sep 1473, died in office)
- Giacomo de Cadapesario (3 Jul 1495 –)
- Jacopo Pisauro (? – 1541)
- Giovanni Maria Pisauro (Coadjutor Bishop: 14 Nov 1541 – 1557)
- Pietro Contarini (9 Aug 1557 – 1562, resigned)
- Francesco Contarini (bishop) (Contareno) (16 Dec 1562 – 1570 died in office)

== See also ==
- Catholic Church in Cyprus
