= Piero Contarini =

Venetian ambassador

- Born: 12 November 1578; Venice
- Died: 19 October 1632 (aged 53); Venice
- Father: Marco di Paolo
- Mother: Comelia di Giorgio Corner
- Occupation: Venetian ambassador to Turin, Paris, London, Madrid and Rome

Piero or Pietro Contarini (1578–1632) was a Venetian aristocrat and ambassador to Turin, Paris, London, Madrid and Rome.

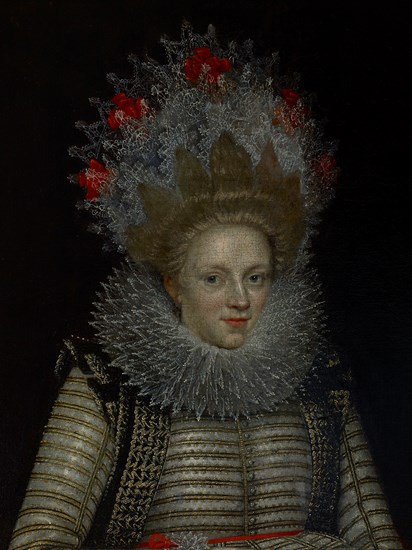
Playwright Elizabeth Cary wears her hair in rays or petals, a style worn by Anne of Denmark in 1617, MFAH

== Life ==
Pietro Contarini was born in Venice on 12 November 1578 to the noble Contarini family. He made a rapid diplomatic career at the service of the Republic of Venice, been sent from 1606 to 1608 to represent the Republic in Turin at the court of Charles Emmanuel I, Duke of Savoy, and from 13 December 1613 to 11 September 1616 in Paris at the court of Louis XIII.

Back to Venice, on 30 August 1617 he was sent to London for an extraordinary diplomatic mission, in order to obtain the support of England to Venice who considered itself threatened by the Habsburg Empire. After this mission, Contarini was sent as ambassador in Spain and on 24 January 1619 he entered in Madrid, where he remained for two years. Returned to Venice for some months he was incharged of the rule of Brescia.

Contarini was consedered a conservative catholic near to the position of papacy, and on 9 June 1623 he was appointed Venetian ambassador in Rome. Returned to Venice, he married a distant relative on 23 September 1627. Partially paralyzed, he died in Venice on 19 October 1632.

== Diplomatic mission to London ==
Contarini arrived in London in November 1617, and had audiences with King James VI and I and Prince Charles. He met Anne of Denmark, who had been unwell, a few days later, and she joked about Spanish policy towards Venice.

Later in December, he went with his chaplain Horatio or Orazio Busino to see the queen at Somerset House, then known as Denmark House. Busino wrote that Anne of Denmark was dressed in pink and gold, with "a farthingale that was four feet wide at the hips". Her hair was dressed in rays or petals, sparsi in giro, so that she resembled a sunflower. Busino described another audience at Somerset House on 28 December, to which Contarini was led through private corridors from the apartments of a lady in waiting to the queen. The lady in waiting carried a candle to light the way in these dark passages. Her gold costume was both "lascivious and ornate". Busino was left behind during Contarini's adventure.

Busino also briefly described Audley End, Theobalds, Greenwich Palace noting the bird house, and Wanstead House. He also composed descriptive essays on life in England, including a short discourse on blood sports. As shown by his description of visiting Somerset House, Orazio Busino had a keen interest in drama and theatre.

In September 1618, Contarini went to Oatlands to see Anne of Denmark. He was first brought to see Charles Howard, 1st Earl of Nottingham, while waiting for the courtiers to assemble. Hunting was rained off. At dinner, Contarini was seated with Alethea Howard, Countess of Arundel, an enthusiast for all things Italian.

Contarini wrote a relazione, a description of English affairs in 1618 after returning to Venice. He noted the growing English trade with the East Indies for pepper, cloves, indigo, and silk, commodities which previously were supplied by Venetian merchants. Contarini heard that Anne of Denmark was unhappy because King James spent less time with her. Although it was often said she was a Catholic, her religion was unknown to him.
