= Pietro Contarini (bishop) =

Bishop of Paphos from 1557 to 1562

- Bishop of Paphos
- Church: Catholic Church
- See: Paphos
- Appointed: 9 August 1557
- Term ended: 16 October 1562

Orders
- Consecration: 21 November 1557 (Bishop) by Giovanni Giacomo Barba

Personal details
- Born: 1491 Venice
- Died: 21 May 1563 (aged 71–72) Padua
- Buried: San Trovaso in Venice

Pietro Contarini (Latin: Petrus Contarenus 1491–1563) was Bishop of Paphos from 1557 to 1562.

== Life ==
Pietro Contarini was born in 1491, in Venice, to the noble Contarini family. In 1509, he and his father, Zaccaria, were made prisoners of the French army after the Battle of Agnadello. He succeeded to return to Venice only in 1513. During the imprisonment he became friend of Andrea Gritti, future Doge, who supported him in the next years.

Left without a political career, Pietro Contarini devoted himself to the classical studies and to charity. Since 1524, he operated in favour of the new Ospedale degli Incurabili, a hospital intended to accommodate those with incurable diseases such as syphilis, and in 1525, he built a church in San Cipriano island near Murano for the Camaldolese hermits and in 1526 he went in pilgrimage to Jerusalem. He meet and supported Saint Ignatius of Loyola in 1536 and 1537 when Ignatius lived in Venice. His support to the Jesuits created some hostility towards him.

From about 1557, he worked in the Roman Curia. On 9 August 1557, Pope Paul IV appointed him bishop of Paphos, a formal title. He was consecrated bishop on 21 November 1557 by Giovanni Giacomo Barba, the sacristan of the Pope. In 1562, he was one of the first bishops to move to Trento to participate to the last period of the Council of Trent. Ill and tired he resigned from his bishopric in favour of his nephew Francesco on 16 December 1562. Pietro Contarini died in Padua on 21 May 1563. He was buried in the San Trovaso church in Venice.
