= Nicolò Bertucci Contarini =

Italian nobleman and amateur naturalist

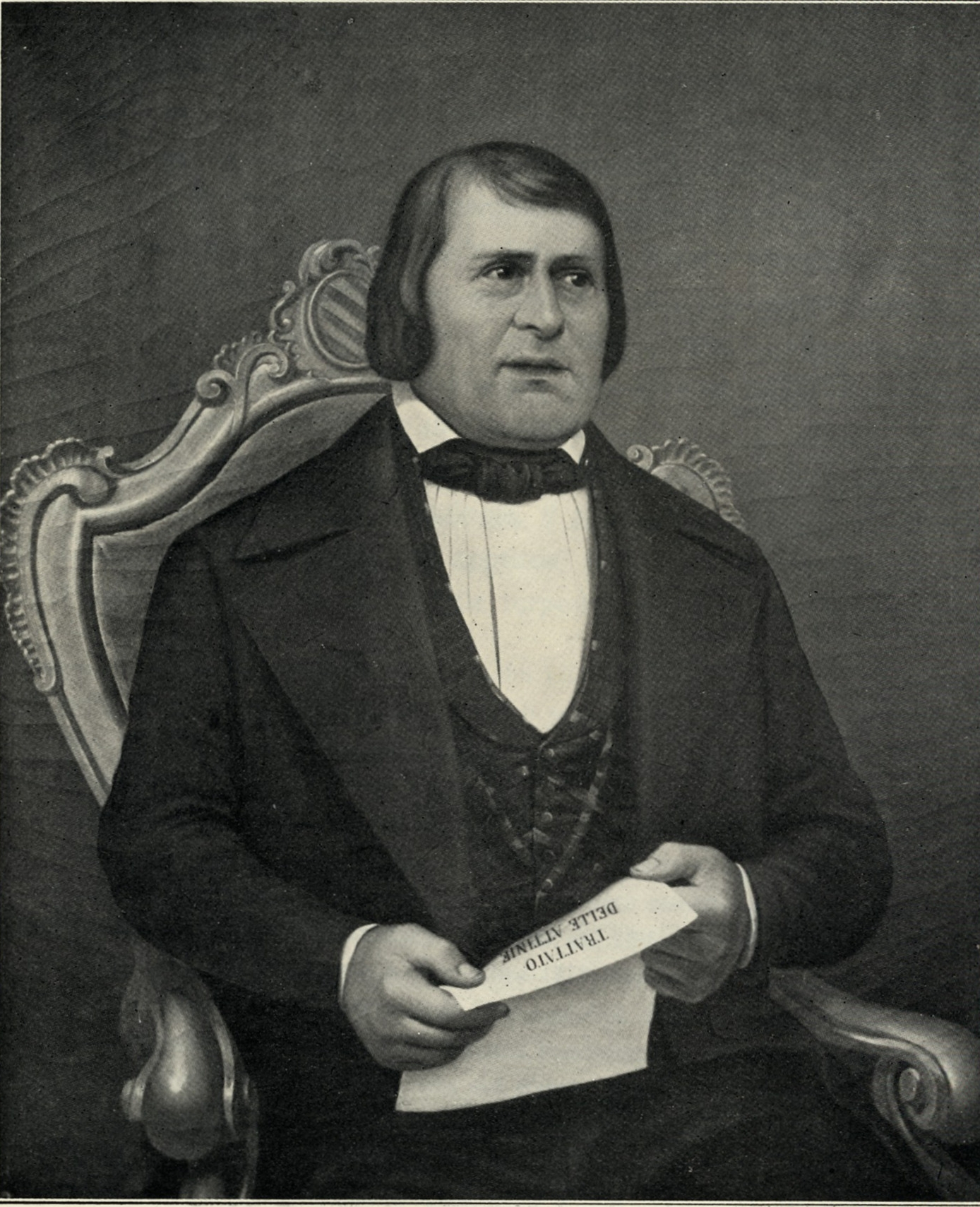

Count Nicolò Bertolucci Contarini (26 September 1780 – 16 April 1849) was an Italian nobleman and amateur naturalist. He collected plants and insects around Venice and published several catalogues.

Contarini was born in Venice in a noble family, the son of Senator Bertucci Paolo. He was sent to the Barnabite college in Udine where he received a classical education. In his private time he began to study natural history through direct field studies and collected plants from the region and built up a herbarium. From 1830 he began to write about insects in agriculture and in 1840 he was inducted into the Venetian institute of sciences, letters and arts. He published a catalogue of the birds and insects of Padova and Venice. He described several species of Cecidomyiid flies including one that he found on the wings of birds. He also took an interest in marine biology, describing new species of Actinia and sea anemones in 1841. Along with Giuseppe Meneghini and Giovanni Zanardini he went on trips to lagoons and mountains. His collection of about 500 bird specimens, and a herbarium are part of the Museo Correr in Venice. The herbarium was reorganized by Vincenzo Lazari and Pier Andrea Saccardo around 1860.
