= Rasca =

Rasca and similar may refer to:

== Geography ==
=== Romania ===
- Râșca, Cluj, a commune in Cluj County
- Râșca, Suceava, a commune in Suceava County
- Râșca, a village in Drăgănești Commune, Neamț County
- Râșca, a village in Gura Caliței Commune, Vrancea County
- Râșca, a village in Moldovița Commune, Suceava County
- Râșca, a village in Ripiceni Commune, Botoșani County
- Râșca Mare, a tributary of the Someșul Rece in Cluj County
- Râșca (Moldova), a tributary of the Moldova in Suceava County
- Râșca (Neamț), a tributary of the Moldova in Neamț County
- Râșca (Someș), a tributary of the Someșul Cald in Cluj County

== People ==
- Rasca (footballer), the nickname of Angolan footballer Maieco Domingos Henrique António

== See also ==
- Rășcani (disambiguation)
- Rîșcani
