= Antonio Tarsia =

Antonio Tarsia may refer to:

- Antonio Tarsia (sculptor)
- Antonio Tarsia (composer)
