= Tarsia (disambiguation) =

Tarsia is a town in southwestern Italy.

Tarsia may also refer to:

- Antonio Tarsia (sculptor), 17th- and 18th-century Italian sculptor
- Antonio Tarsia (composer), 17th- and 18th-century Italian composer
- Joseph Tarsia, recording engineer
- 39564 Tarsia, an asteroid
- Tarsus (Bithynia), historical region in modern Turkey

== See also ==
- Tarzia
