= Moișa =

Moișa may refer to several places in Romania:

- Moișa, a village in Glodeni Commune, Mureș County
- Moișa, a village in Boroaia Commune, Suceava County
- Moișa (Râșca), a tributary of the Râșca in Suceava County
