= Tarzia =

Tarzia is a surname. Notable people with the surname include:

- Vincent Tarzia (born 1968), Australian politician
- Antonio Tarzia (born 1940), Italian journalist
- Diego Tarzia (born 2003), Argentine footballer

== See also ==
- Tarsia (disambiguation)
- Târzia
