= Alvise Mocenigo =

Alvise Mocenigo may refer to:

- Alvise I Mocenigo (1507–1577), doge of Venice, 1570–1577
- Alvise II Mocenigo (1628–1709), doge of Venice, 1700–1709
- Alvise Giovanni Mocenigo (1701–1778), doge of Venice, 1763–1778
- Sebastiano Mocenigo (Alvise III Sebastiano Mocenigo, 1662–1732), doge of Venice, 1722–1732

== See also ==
- House of Mocenigo, a Venetian family
