= Târzia =

- Location within Romania

Location
- Country: Romania
- Counties: Neamț County
- Villages: Groși, Târzia

Physical characteristics
- Mouth: Râșca
  - coordinates: 47.3195°N 26.4033°E

Basin features
- Progression: Râșca→ Moldova→ Siret→ Danube→ Black Sea
- Tributaries
  - left: Slătioara
  - right: Pârâul Rău
- River code: XII.1.40.39.1

The Târzia is a right tributary of the river Râșca in Romania. It flows into the Râșca near Orțăști. Its length is 14 km (8.7 mi) and its basin size is 29 km^{2} (11 sq mi).
