= Râșcuța =

- Location within Romania

Location
- Country: Romania
- Counties: Suceava County

Physical characteristics
- Mouth: Râșca
  - location: Dumbrăveni
  - coordinates: 47.3665°N 26.1599°E
- Length: 16 km (9.9 mi)
- Basin size: 44 km^{2} (17 sq mi)

Basin features
- Progression: Râșca→ Moldova→ Siret→ Danube→ Black Sea

The Râșcuța is a right tributary of the river Râșca in Romania. It flows into the Râșca near Dumbrăveni. Its length is 16 km (9.9 mi) and its basin size is 44 km^{2} (17 sq mi).
