= Râșca (Moldova) =

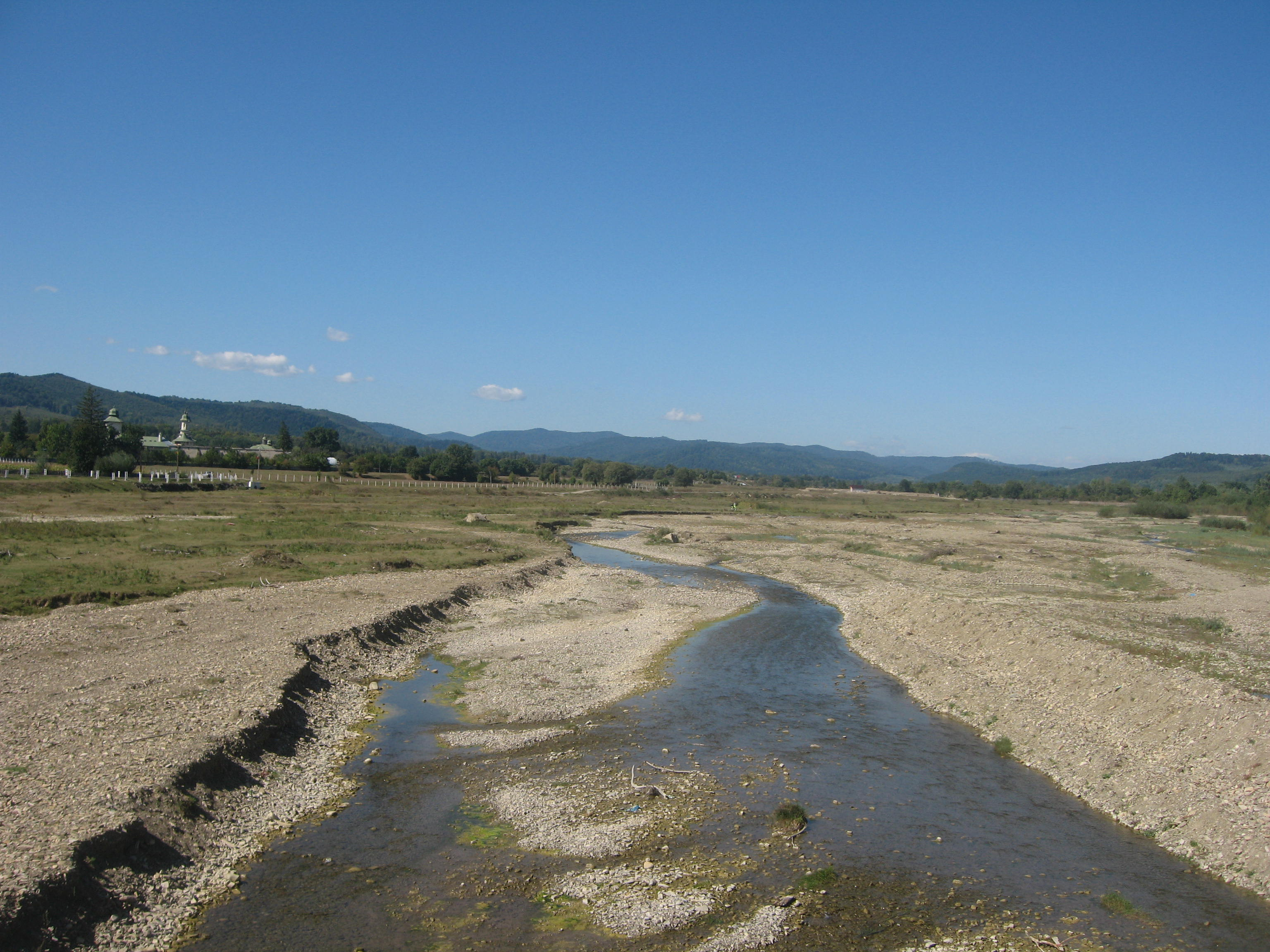
- Râșca River near Râșca Monastery

- Location within Romania

Location
- Country: Romania
- Counties: Suceava
- Villages: Buda, Râșca, Bogdănești, Praxia

Physical characteristics
- Mouth: Moldova
  - location: Praxia
  - coordinates: 47.3823°N 26.3311°E
- Length: 35 km (22 mi)
- Basin size: 217 km^{2} (84 sq mi)

Basin features
- Progression: Moldova→ Siret→ Danube→ Black Sea
- Tributaries
  - right: Râșcuța, Moișa

The Râșca is a right tributary of the river Moldova in Romania. It discharges into the Moldova near Praxia. Its length is 35 km (22 mi) and its basin size is 217 km^{2} (84 sq mi). Its former lower course, the Râșca, discharges into the Moldova further downstream.
