= Plopul River =

Plopul River may refer to the following rivers in Romania:

- Plopul, tributary of the Galbena in Hunedoara County
- Plopul, tributary of the Moișa in Suceava County

== See also ==
- Recea River (Vâlcea), aka Plopi River
- Plopoasa River
- Plopu River
