= Rășcani =

Răşcani may refer to several villages in Romania:

- Răşcani, a village in Dăneşti Commune, Vaslui County
- Răşcani, a village in Șuletea Commune, Vaslui County

== See also ==
- Rîșcani
- Râșca (disambiguation)
