= Vadu Moldovei =

- Commune
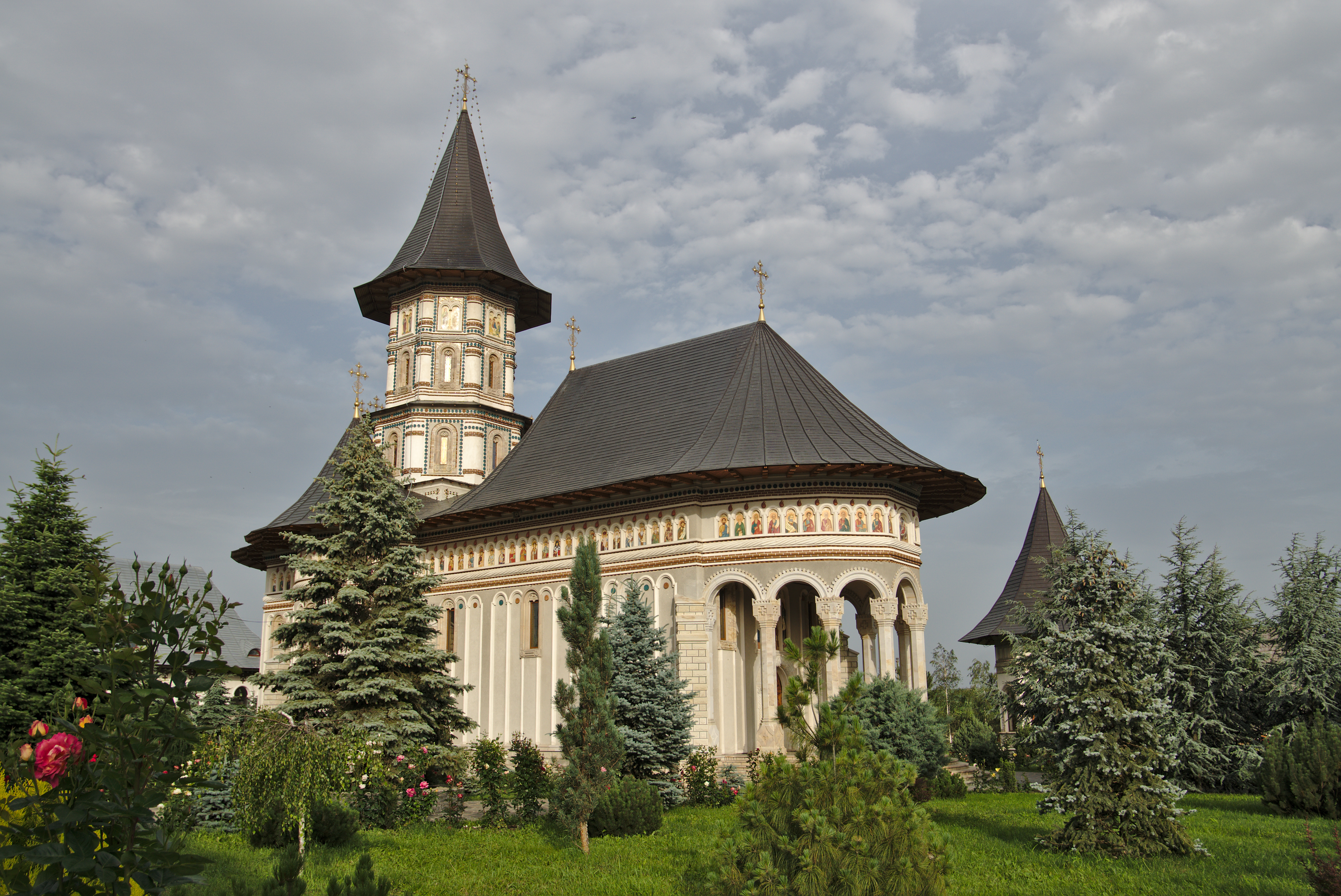
- Cămârzani Monastery

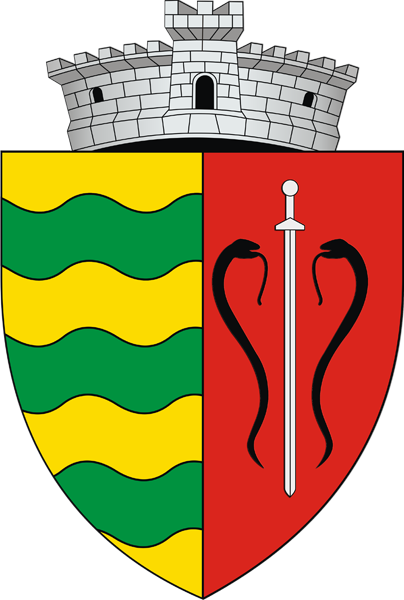
- Coat of arms

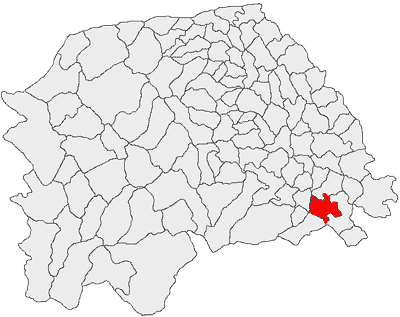
- Location in Suceava County

- Location in Romania
- Coordinates: 47°23′N 26°22′E
- Country: Romania
- County: Suceava
- Subdivisions: Vadu Moldovei, Cămârzani, Ciumulești, Dumbrăvița, Ioneasa, Mesteceni, Movileni, Nigotești

Government
  - Mayor (2024–2028): Iulian-Bogdan Amariei (PSD)
- Area: 41 km^{2} (16 sq mi)
- Elevation: 328 m (1,076 ft)
- Population (2021-12-01): 4,000
  - Density: 98/km^{2} (250/sq mi)
- Time zone: UTC+02:00 (EET)
  - Summer (DST): UTC+03:00 (EEST)
- Postal code: 727560
- Area code: (+40) x30
- Vehicle reg.: SV
- Website: comunavadumoldovei.ro

Vadu Moldovei is a commune located in Suceava County, Western Moldavia, Romania. It is composed of eight villages: Cămârzani, Ciumulești, Dumbrăvița, Ioneasa, Mesteceni (German: Augustendorf), Movileni, Nigotești, and Vadu Moldovei. It included four other villages until 2003, when these were split off to form Fântâna Mare Commune.
