= Silvestro Valier =

Doge of Venice from 1694 to 1700

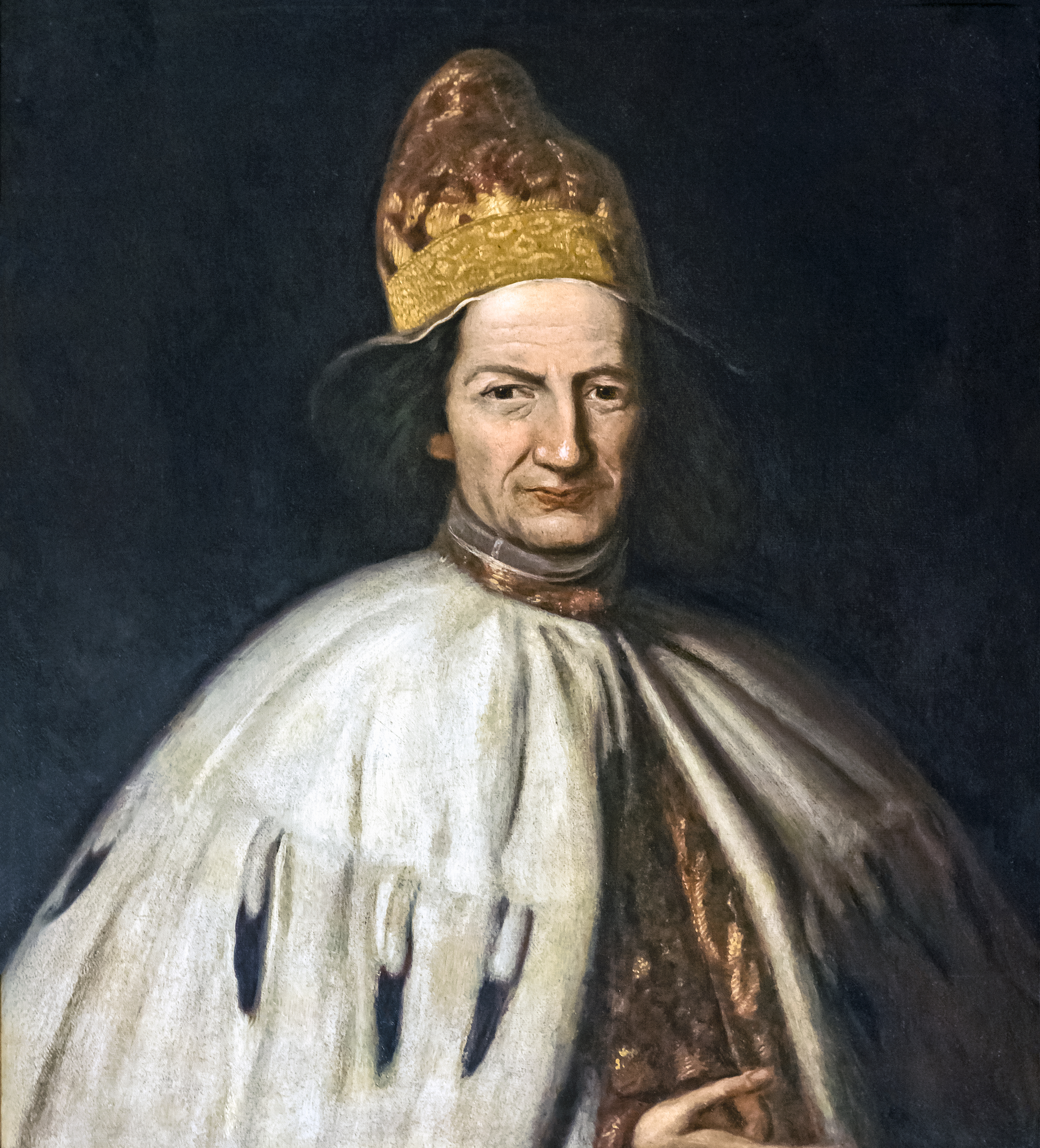
- Portrait by Niccolò Cassana, 1694

Doge of Venice
- In office 1694–1700
- Preceded by: Francesco Morosini
- Succeeded by: Alvise II Mocenigo

Personal details
- Born: 28 March 1630 Venice, Republic of Venice
- Died: 7 July 1700 (aged 70) Venice, Republic of Venice

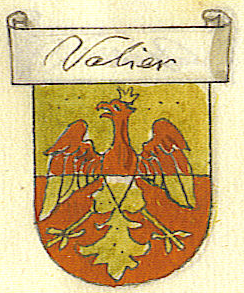
Coat of arms of the Valier family

Silvestro Valier or Valiero (Venice, 28 March 1630 – Venice, 7 July 1700) was the 109th Doge of Venice, reigning from his election on 25 February 1694 until his death six years later. The Morean War between the Republic of Venice and the Ottoman Empire, which had been ongoing since 1684, came to an end during Valier's reign as Doge, in January 1699.

== Background, 1630–1694 ==
Silvestro Valier was the son of Bertuccio Valier, who had served as Doge from 1656 to 1658. On 8 August 1649, in the church of Santa Maria Formosa, Silvestro Valier was married to Elisabetta Querini; Valier was only 19 years old. Valier then became procurator by purchasing the office. According to his chroniclers, Valier did not possess any special talents, but he was handsome, and a good speaker. Throughout his career, he was most interested in the diplomatic affairs of the Most Serene Republic, and where his good looks and way with words proved useful. Valier was a lover of the good life, but he was also generous to the poor and thereby gained their affections.

== Reign as Doge, 1694–1700 ==
Doge Francesco Morosini died on 16 January 1694. Morosini, a military hero before becoming Doge, had been the rare seventeenth-century Doge of Venice who was active on the battlefield. However, on his death, with the Republic still embroiled in war and facing massive economic difficulties, Venetians decided to elect someone who was not very ambitious. They therefore elected Silvestro Valier on 25 February 1694, and he celebrated by paying for lavish celebrations and banquets. Although the Grand Council had, in 1645, abolished the elaborate ceremony for installing a new dogaressa, because of its large expense to the state and to the Doge, Valier convinced the council to grant an exception. As such, on 4 March 1694, Elisabetta Querini appeared clad in a cloth of gold robe adorned with sable, with a white veil and corno ducale, (the version of ducal crown worn by the Doge and his wife) adorned with jewels, and a large diamond cross on her chest. Together Valier and his wife sat on the throne of Venice and received counselors, ministers, judges, and the capis of the Ten.

Venice's war with the Ottoman Empire - the Morean War - was only one part of the Ottoman Empire's struggle against the Holy League of 1684. On 11 September 1697, Ottoman forces were defeated by troops of the Holy Roman Empire and the Kingdom of Hungary at the Battle of Zenta. This decisive battle led to the Ottoman Empire's determination to end the Great Turkish War, and peace negotiations began at Sremski Karlovci. These negotiations eventually produced the Treaty of Karlowitz, signed on 26 January 1699 and ending the Great Turkish War, including the Morean War. Under the Treaty, Venice received the Morea, Aegina, Lefkada, and Zakynthos. Most Venetians felt they gained far too little territory to compensate for the huge loss of life and expense of the wars with the Ottoman Empire. The Republic was exhausted by the long war and facing economic distress, but little changed for Valier, and he continued hosting banquets, receptions, and parties at which he entertained persons of rank.

Already sick, Valier's last days were made worse by a series of family disputes. He died on 7 July 1700. He was buried in the Basilica di San Giovanni e Paolo, where twenty-four other doges also found their resting place. Between 1705 and 1708, a huge tomb was built in the Basilica for Valier, his wife, and his father. The tomb consists on either side of two large Corinthian columns of black marble. The tomb was designed by architect Andrea Tirali, and contained sculptures from Antonio Tarsia, Pietro Baratta, and others, and the bas relief was overseen by Gruppello Marino.

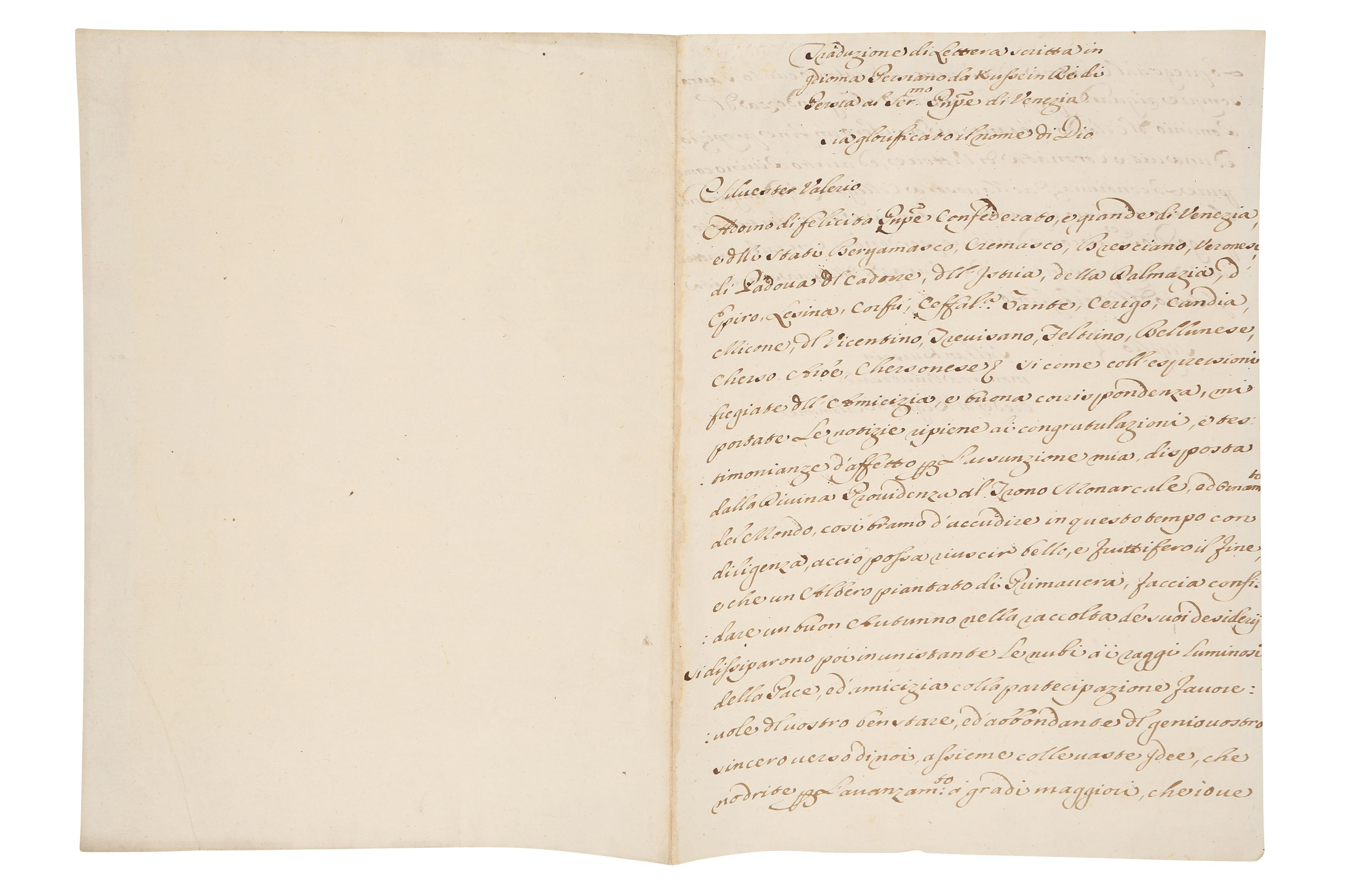
Italian translation of a c. 1694 Persian letter of congratulations sent by Shah Soltan Hoseyn of Safavid Iran to Valier, the newly elected Doge of Venice. Although the content is mostly honorific and auspicious, the underlining tone serves the political purpose of expanding relations between the two countries in case of an Ottoman insurgence

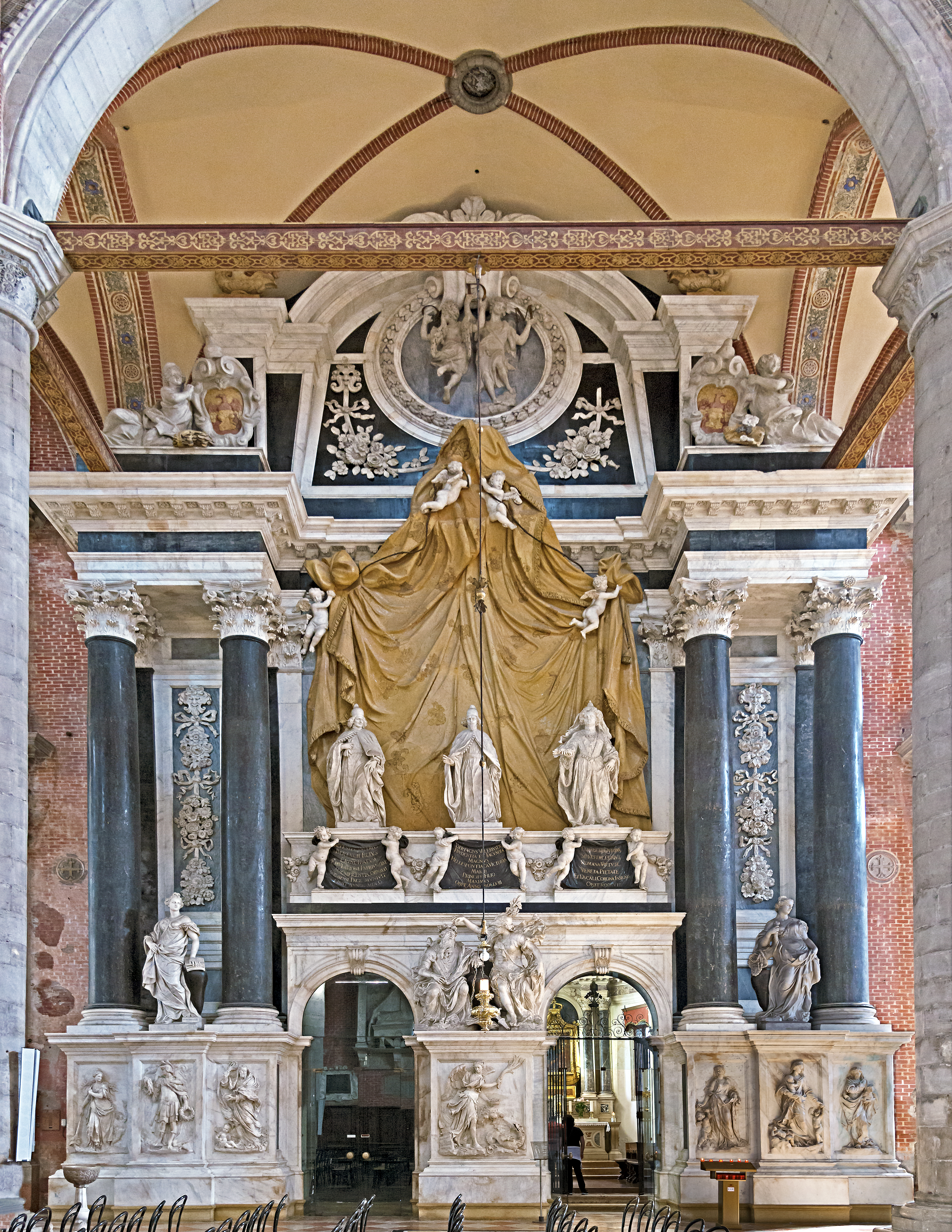
Monument of the Valier family

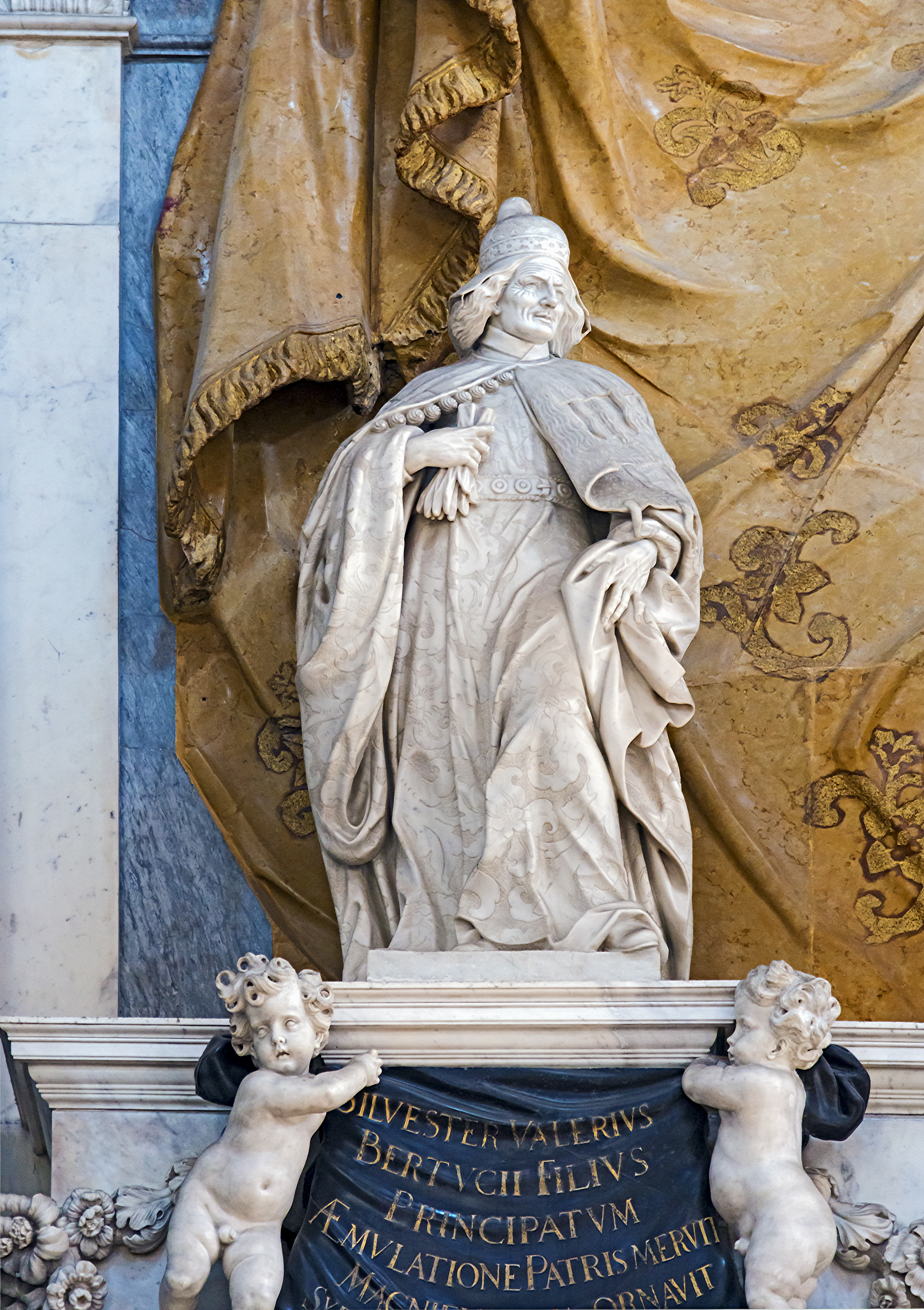
Statue of Silvestro Valier

== References and notes ==
This article was based on this article on Italian Wikipedia and this article on French Wikipedia.

Media related to Silvestro Valier at Wikimedia Commons

Political offices
Preceded by Francesco Morosini	Doge of Venice; 1694–1700	Succeeded by Alvise II Mocenigo
