= Râșca (Neamț) =

- Location within Romania

Location
- Country: Romania
- Counties: Neamț
- Villages: Drăgănești

Physical characteristics
- Mouth: Moldova
  - location: Ungheni
  - coordinates: 47.2769°N 26.4928°E
- Length: 19 km (12 mi)
- Basin size: 122 km^{2} (47 sq mi)

Basin features
- Progression: Moldova→ Siret→ Danube→ Black Sea
- Tributaries
  - right: Târzia, Brusturi

The Râșca is a right tributary of the river Moldova in Romania. It discharges into the Moldova near Ungheni. Its length is 19 km (12 mi) and its basin size is 122 km^{2} (47 sq mi). Its former upper course, the Râșca, discharges into the Moldova further upstream.
