= Alvise II Mocenigo =

Doge of Venice from 1700 to 1709

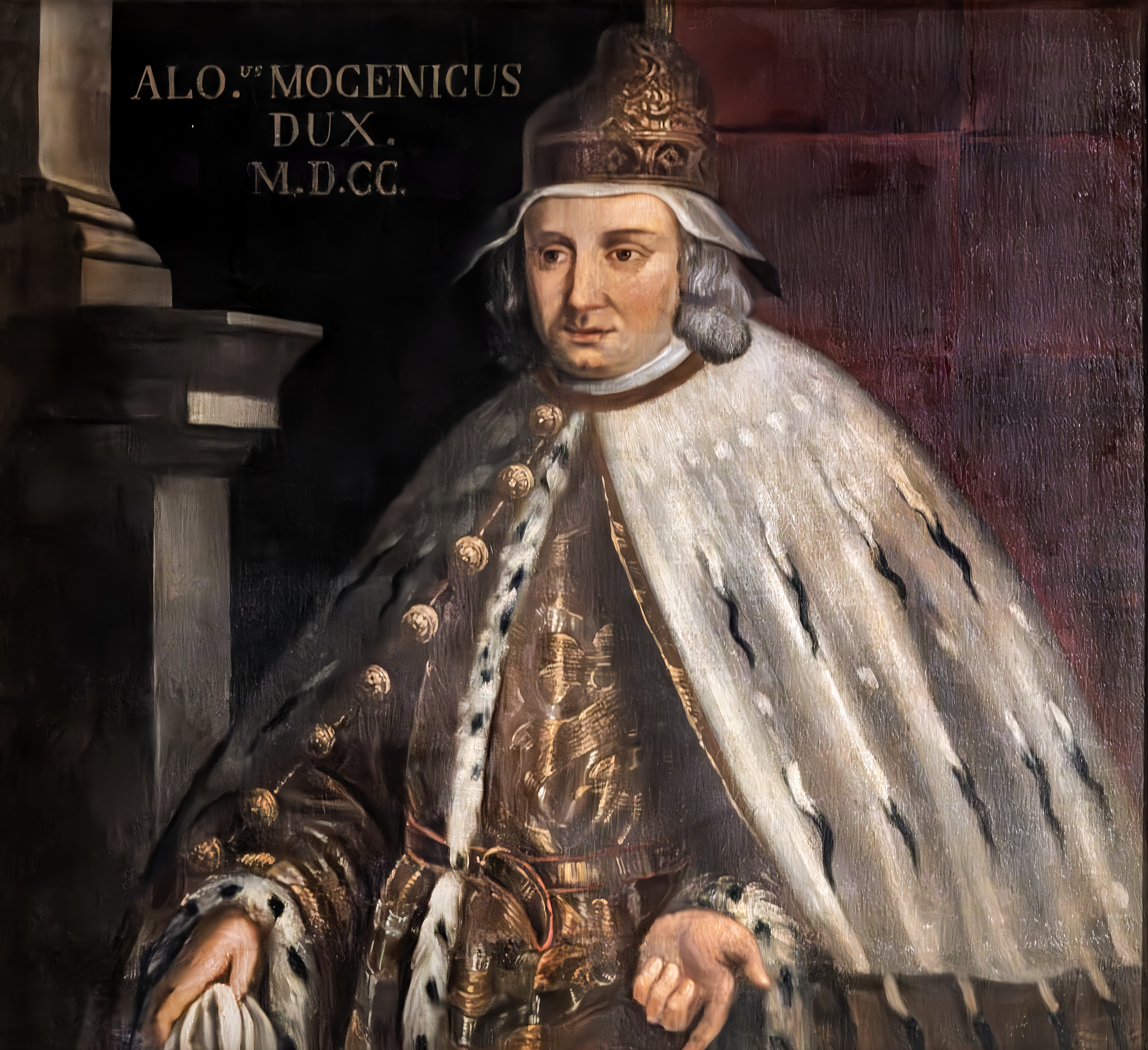

Doge of Venice
- In office 1700–1709
- Preceded by: Silvestro Valier
- Succeeded by: Giovanni II Cornaro

Personal details
- Born: 3 January 1628 Republic of Venice
- Died: 6 May 1709 (aged 81) Venice

Alvise II Mocenigo, also known as Luigi Mocenigo (3 January 1628 – 6 May 1709), was the 110th doge of the Republic of Venice from 17 July 1700 until his death.

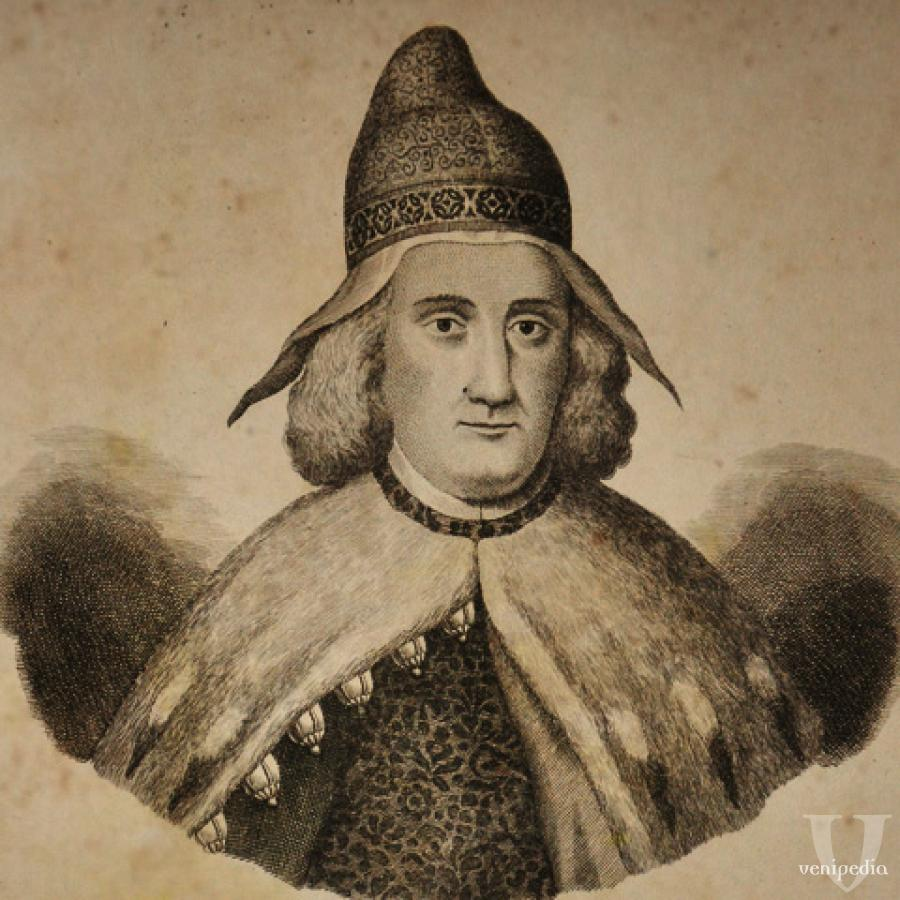
Alvise II Mocenigo as Doge

== See also ==
- Mocenigo family
- Alvise I Mocenigo

Political offices
Preceded by Silvestro Valiero	Doge of Venice; 1700–1709	Succeeded by Giovanni II Cornaro
