= Moișa (Râșca) =

- Location within Romania

Location
- Country: Romania
- Counties: Suceava County

Physical characteristics
- Mouth: Râșca
  - location: Râșca
  - coordinates: 47.3520°N 26.2361°E
- Length: 12 km (7.5 mi)
- Basin size: 47 km^{2} (18 sq mi)

Basin features
- Progression: Râșca→ Moldova→ Siret→ Danube→ Black Sea
- Tributaries
  - left: Plopul

The Moișa is a right tributary of the river Râșca in Romania. It flows into the Râșca in the village Râșca. Its length is 12 km (7.5 mi) and its basin size is 47 km^{2} (18 sq mi).
