= Brusturi, Neamț =

Brusturi
- Commune
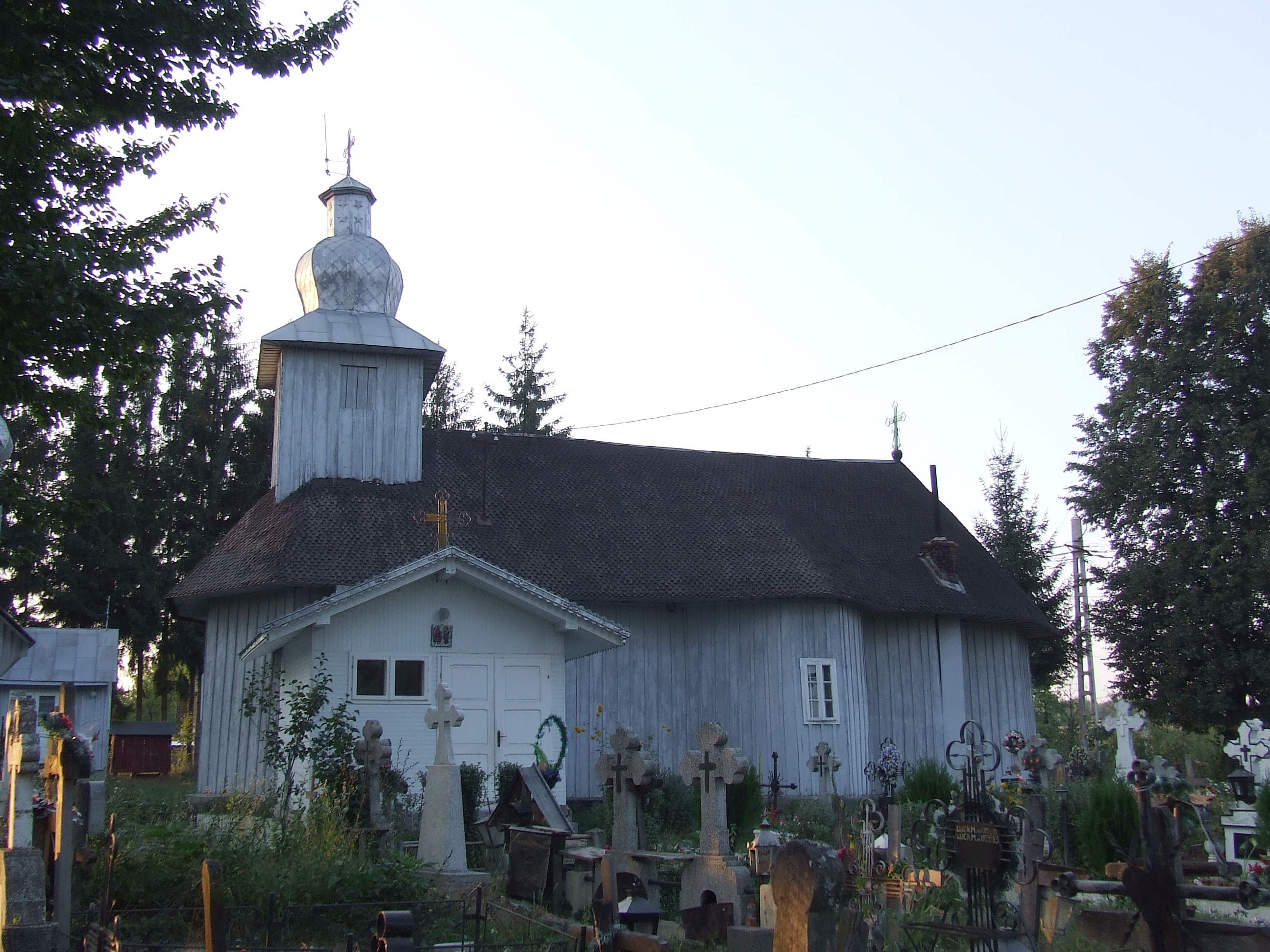
- Wooden church in Groși

- Location in Neamț County

- Location in Romania
- Coordinates: 47.283°N 26.383°E
- Country: Romania
- County: Neamț

Government
  - Mayor (2020–2024): Daniel Lozonschi (PSD)
- Area: 49.32 km^{2} (19.04 sq mi)
- Elevation: 341 m (1,119 ft)
- Population (2021-12-01): 3,686
  - Density: 74.74/km^{2} (193.6/sq mi)
- Time zone: UTC+02:00 (EET)
  - Summer (DST): UTC+03:00 (EEST)
- Postal code: 617106
- Area code: +(40) 233
- Vehicle reg.: NT
- Website: www.comunabrusturi.ro

Brusturi is a commune in Neamț County, Western Moldavia, Romania. It is composed of four villages: Brusturi, Groși, Poiana, and Târzia. Called Brusturi-Drăgănești until 2004, it included four other villages until that year, when these were split off to form Drăgănești Commune.

Historical population
Year	Pop.	±%
2002	3,957	—
2011	3,852	−2.7%
2021	3,686	−4.3%
Source: Census data
