= Antonio Tarsia (composer) =

Italian composer

To be distinguished from Antonio Tarsia (sculptor) (Venice 1662–1739), an Italian sculptor.

Antonio Tarsia (July 28, 1643 – 1722) was an Italian composer.

Tarsia was born in Capodistria, a city in the Istria region under the Venetian dominion, today Koper, in Slovenia. He was the major Istrian composer of the early Baroque, and left a large amount of Latin sacred compositions. He died in Capodistria.
