= Fântâna Mare =

- Commune
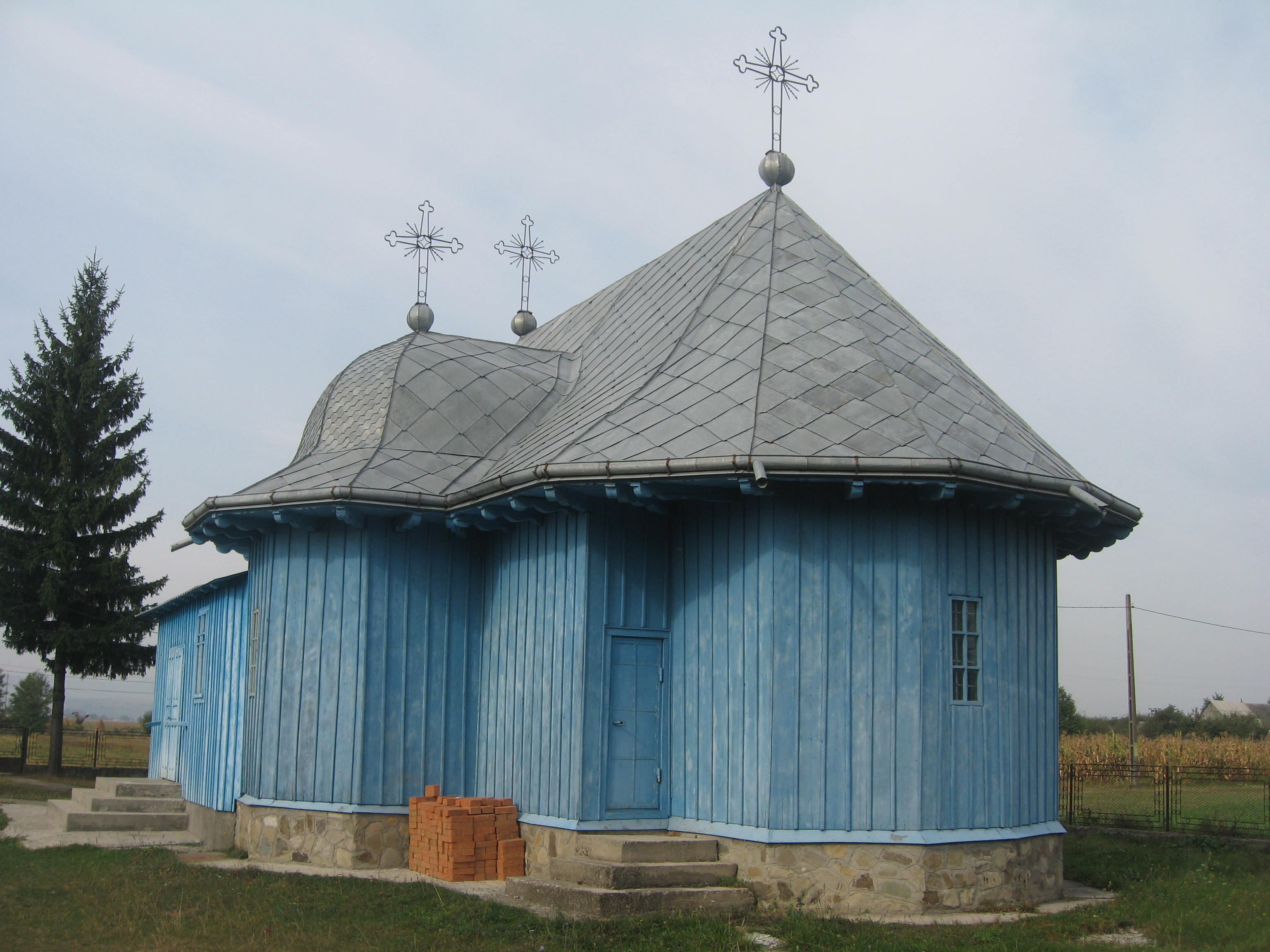
- Wooden church in Praxia

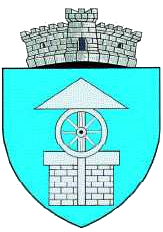
- Coat of arms

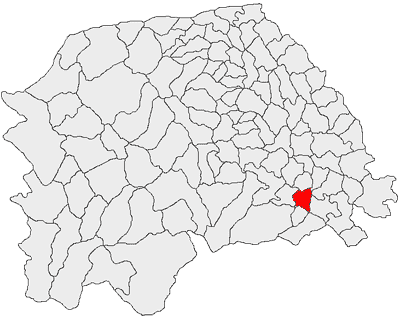
- Location in Suceava County

- Location in Romania
- Coordinates: 47°25′N 26°18′E
- Country: Romania
- County: Suceava

Government
  - Mayor (2020–2024): Vasile Mucilenița (Ind.)
- Area: 32.8 km^{2} (12.7 sq mi)
- Elevation: 348 m (1,142 ft)
- Population (2021-12-01): 2,194
  - Density: 66.9/km^{2} (173/sq mi)
- Time zone: UTC+02:00 (EET)
  - Summer (DST): UTC+03:00 (EEST)
- Postal code: 727566
- Area code: +(40) 230
- Vehicle reg.: SV
- Website: comunafantanamare.ro

Fântâna Mare is a commune located in Suceava County, Romania. It is composed of four villages: Cotu Băii, Fântâna Mare, Praxia, and Spătărești. These were part of Vadu Moldovei Commune until 2003, when they were split off.

== Natives ==
- Matei B. Cantacuzino (1855 – 1925), jurist and politician
