= Antonio Tarsia (sculptor) =

Italian sculptor (1662–1739)

Antonio Tarsia (1662 – 10 December 1739) was an Italian sculptor. He was born in Venice and was one of the most active Venetian sculptors in the early 18th century. Tarsia was mentor and father-in-law to sculptor Antonio Corradini. He died on 10 December 1739 in Venice.

== Gallery ==
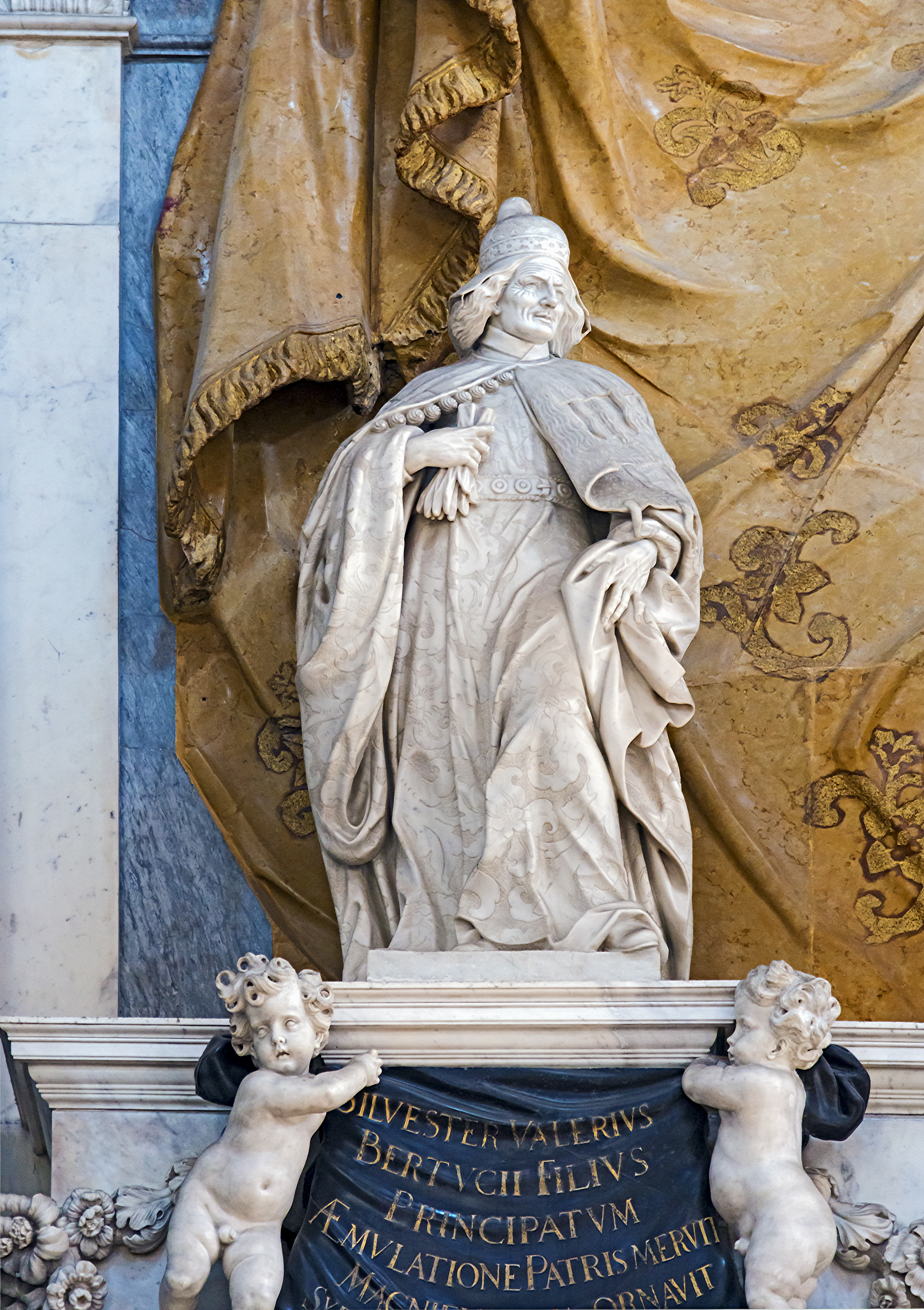
Doge Silvestro Valier San Zanipolo Venice

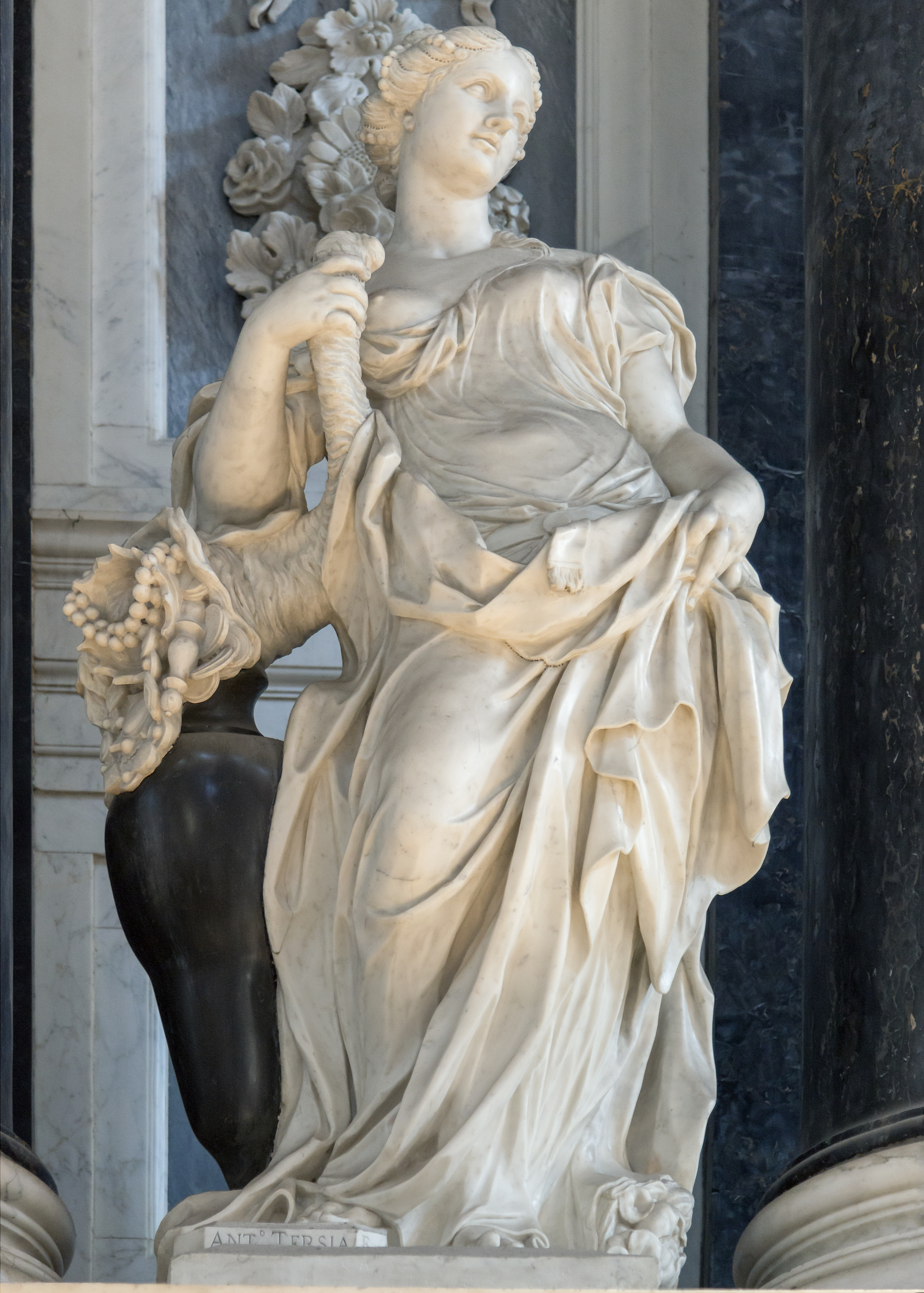
the Abundance San Zanipolo Venice

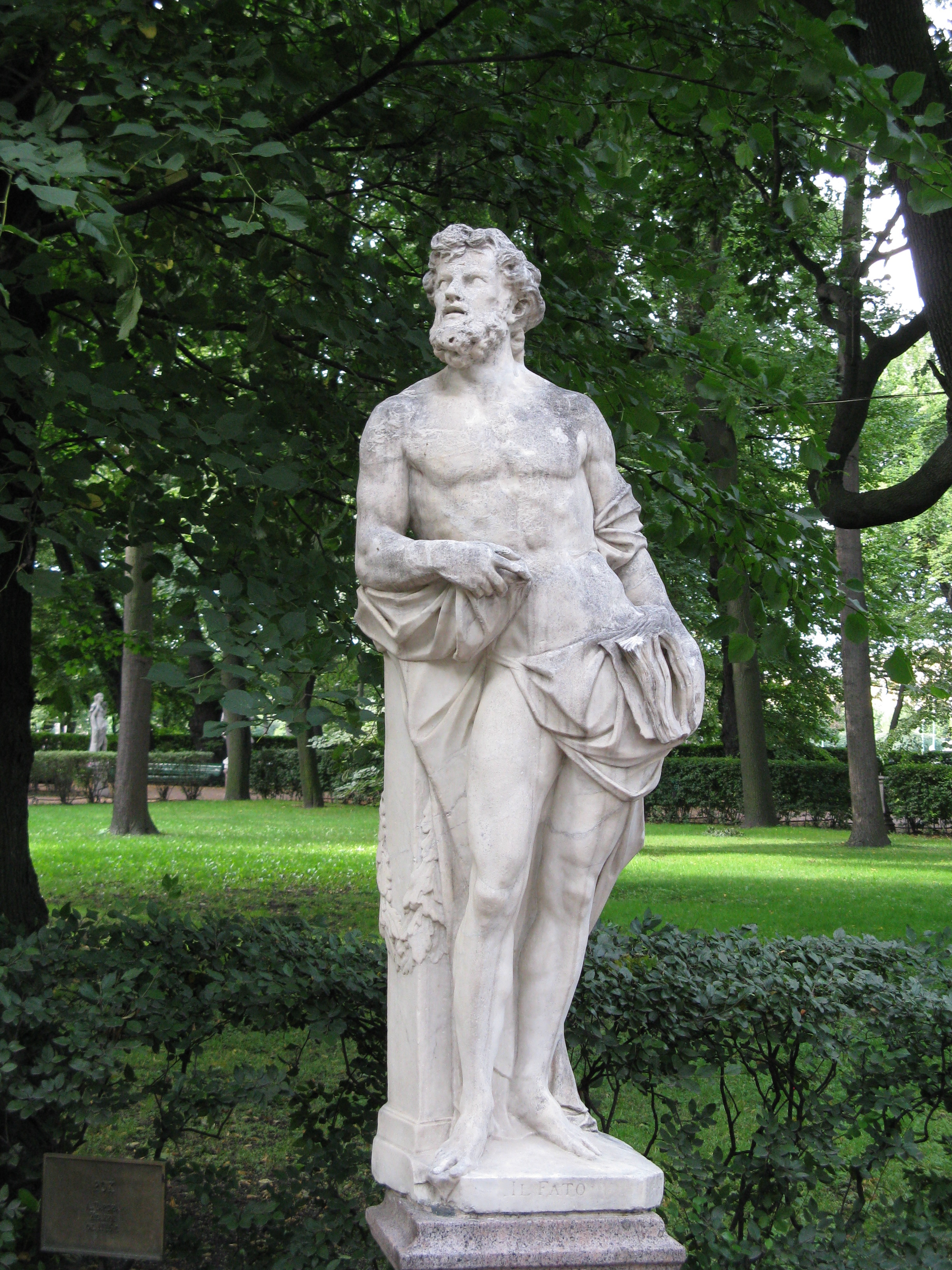
Il Fato at Summer Garden. Saint Petersburg

== Sources ==
- Semenzato, Camillo (2003). "Tarsia, Antonio". Grove Art Online.
