= Drăgănești, Neamț =

Drăgănești
- Commune
- Location in Neamț County

- Location in Romania
- Coordinates: 47.307°N 26.406°E
- Country: Romania
- County: Neamț

Government
  - Mayor (2024–2028): Ion Nechifor (PNL)
- Area: 26.50 km^{2} (10.23 sq mi)
- Elevation: 318 m (1,043 ft)
- Population (2021-12-01): 1,533
  - Density: 57.85/km^{2} (149.8/sq mi)
- Time zone: UTC+02:00 (EET)
  - Summer (DST): UTC+03:00 (EEST)
- Postal code: 617017
- Area code: +(40) 233
- Vehicle reg.: NT
- Website: www.comunadraganestineamt.ro

Drăgănești is a commune in Neamț County, Western Moldavia, Romania. It is composed of four villages: Drăgănești, Orțăști, Râșca, and Șoimărești. These were part of Brusturi-Drăgănești Commune until 2004, when they were split off and the remainder was renamed Brusturi.

Historical population
Year	Pop.	±%
2002	1,645	—
2011	1,389	−15.6%
2021	1,533	+10.4%
Source: Census data
