= Râșca, Suceava =

Râșca
- Commune
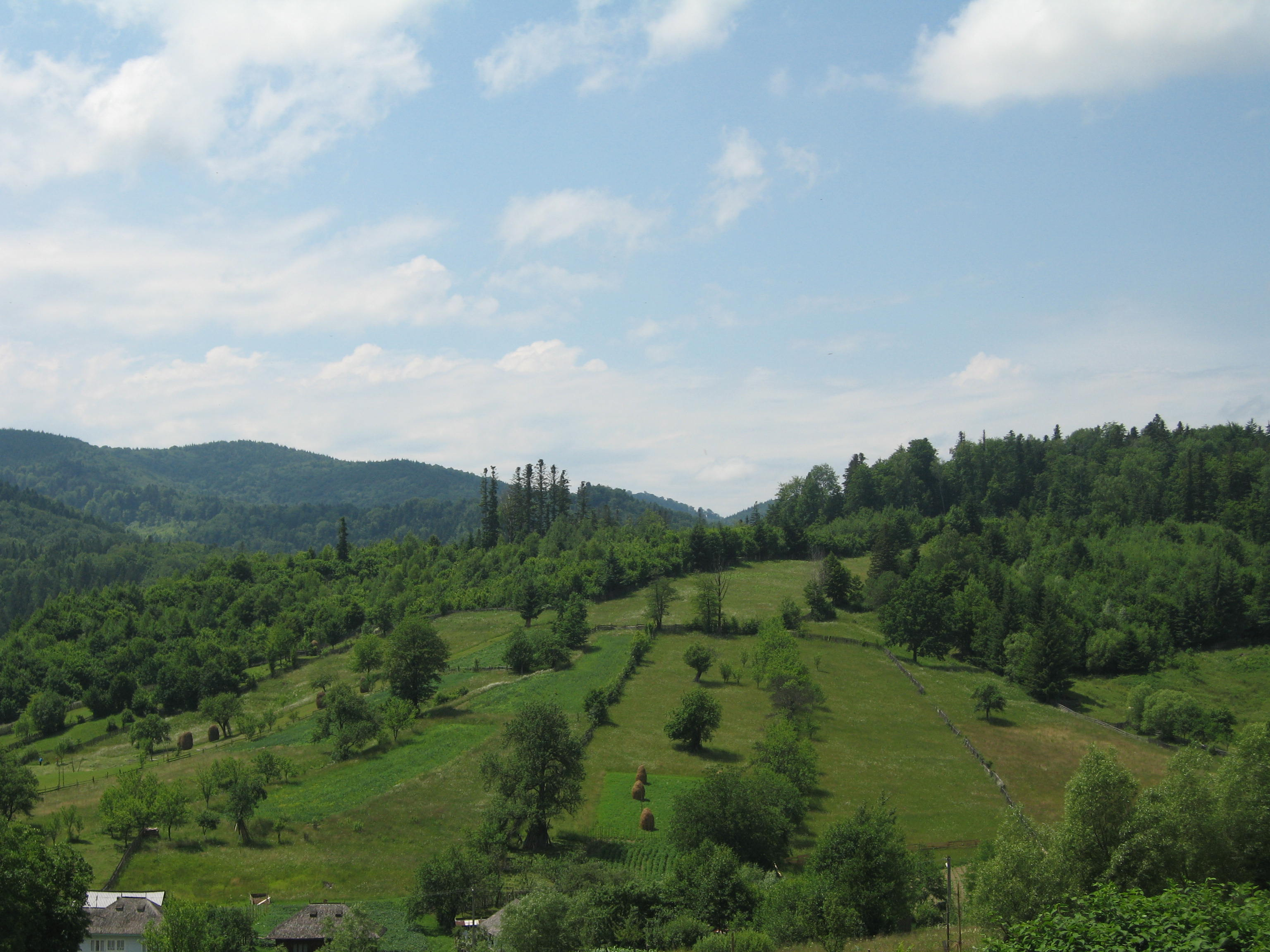
- Rural landscape in Slătioara, Râșca

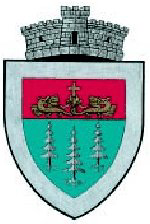
- Coat of arms

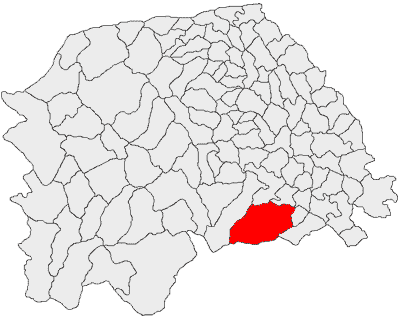
- Location in Suceava County

- Location in Romania
- Coordinates: 47°22′N 26°14′E
- Country: Romania
- County: Suceava
- Subdivisions: Râșca, Buda, Dumbrăveni, Jahalia, Slătioara

Government
  - Mayor (2024–2028): Ionuț-Dragomir Andreica (PNL)
- Area: 207 km^{2} (80 sq mi)
- Elevation: 403 m (1,322 ft)
- Population (2021-12-01): 5,101
  - Density: 24.6/km^{2} (63.8/sq mi)
- Time zone: UTC+02:00 (EET)
  - Summer (DST): UTC+03:00 (EEST)
- Postal code: 727465
- Area code: (+40) x30
- Vehicle reg.: SV

Râșca is a commune located in Suceava County, Western Moldavia, northeastern Romania. It is composed of five villages: Buda, Dumbrăveni, Jahalia, Râșca, and Slătioara. The name Râșca comes from the Slavic word "речка" which is a diminutive of the word "река" meaning "river".

== Administration and local politics ==
=== Communal council ===
The commune's current local council has the following political composition, according to the results of the 2020 Romanian local elections:

Party	Seats	Current Council
National Liberal Party (PNL)	5	
Social Democratic Party (PSD)	4	
People's Movement Party (PMP)	3	
PRO Romania (PRO)	2	
Independent politician (Rogojină Ioan)	1	

== Gallery ==
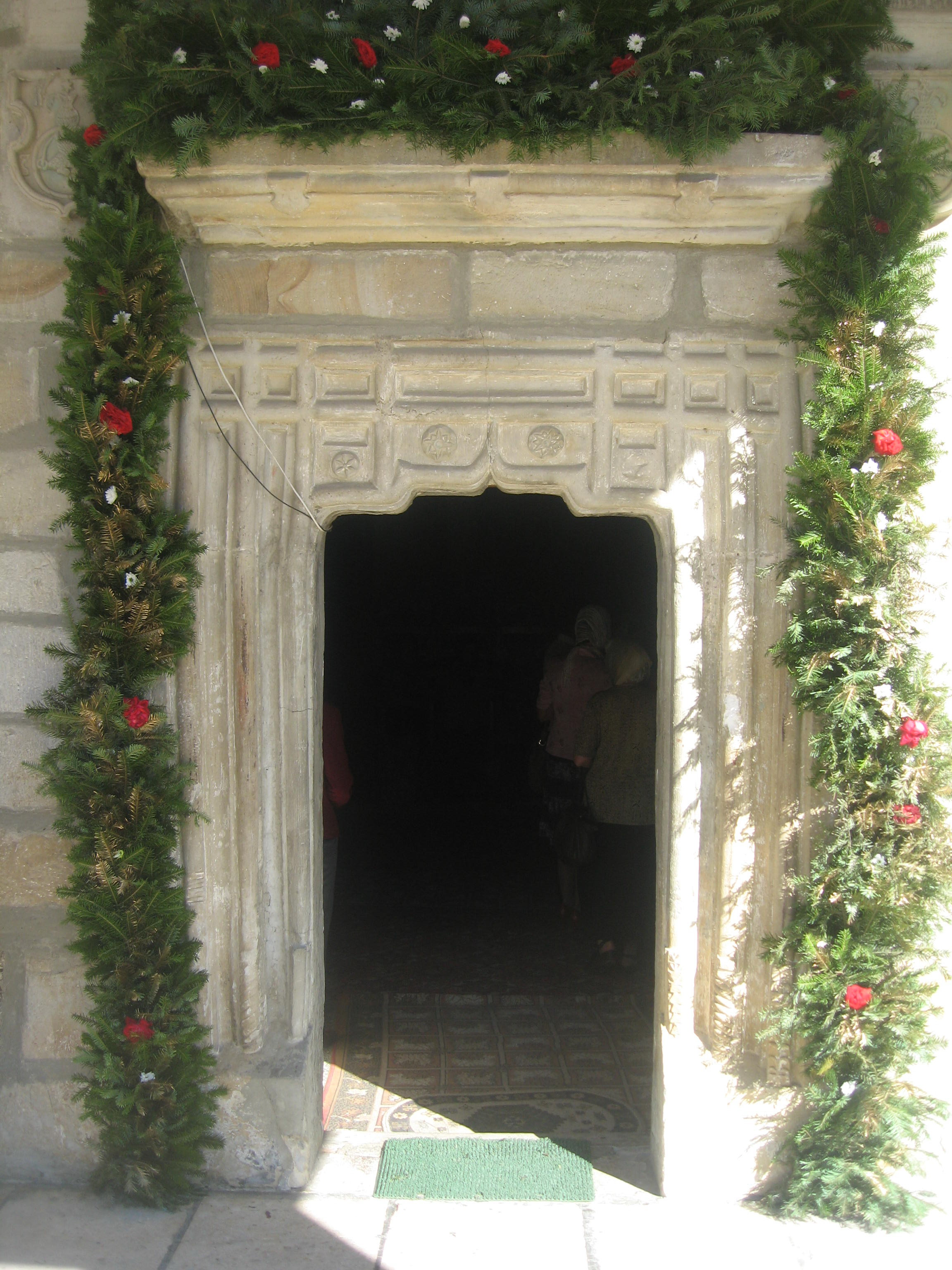
Entrance in Râșca Monastery

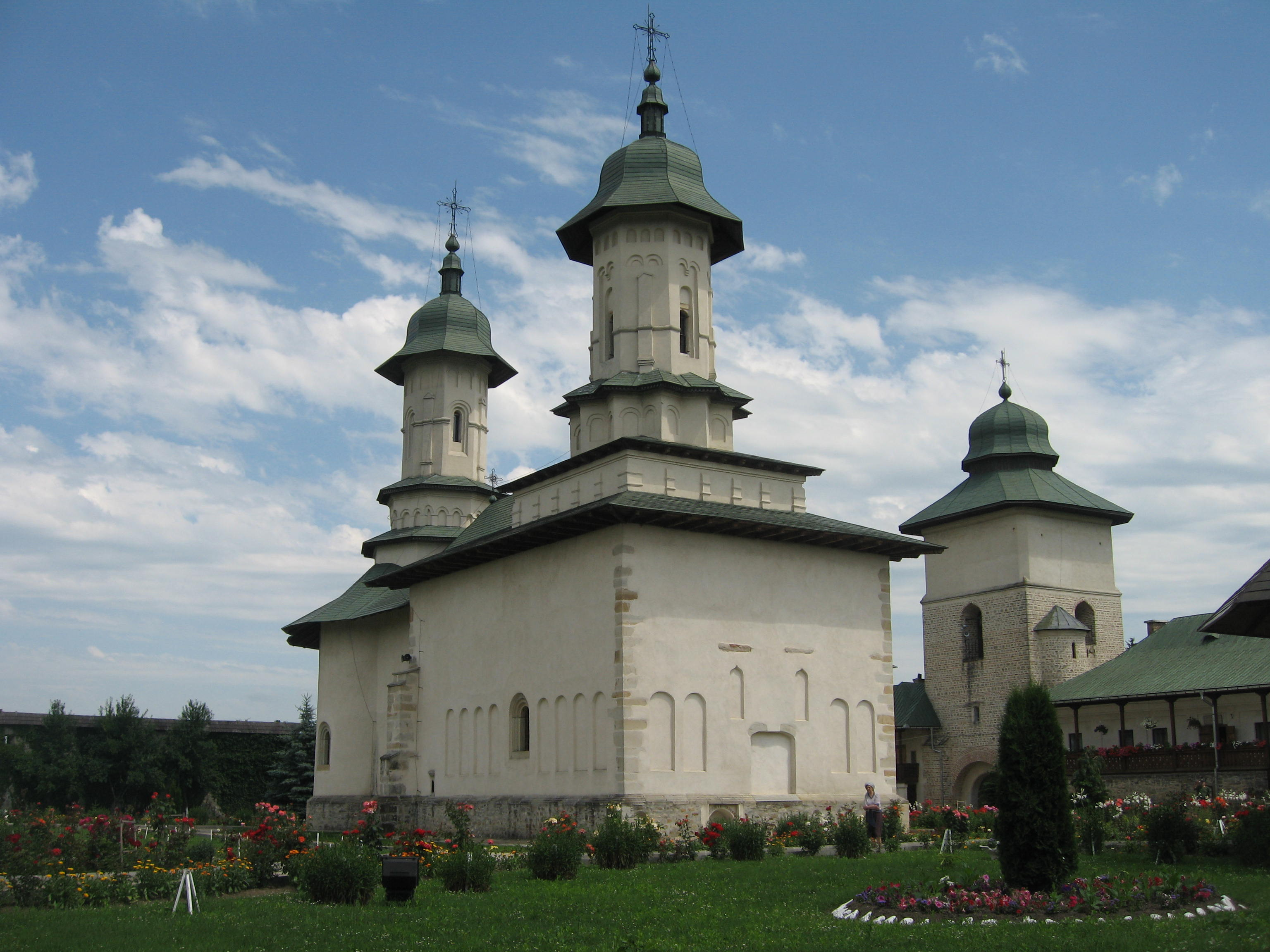
Râșca Monastery

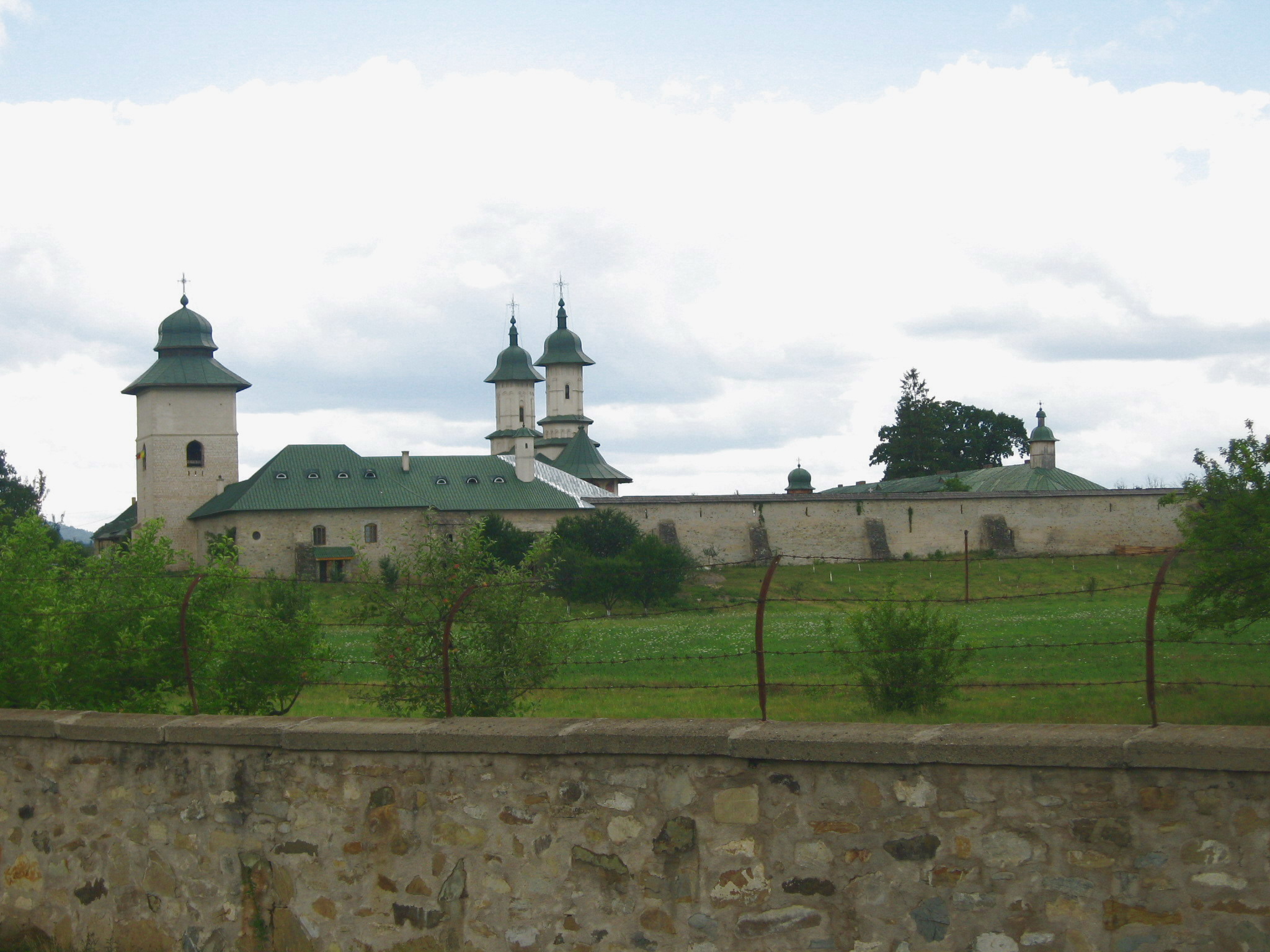
Râșca Monastery

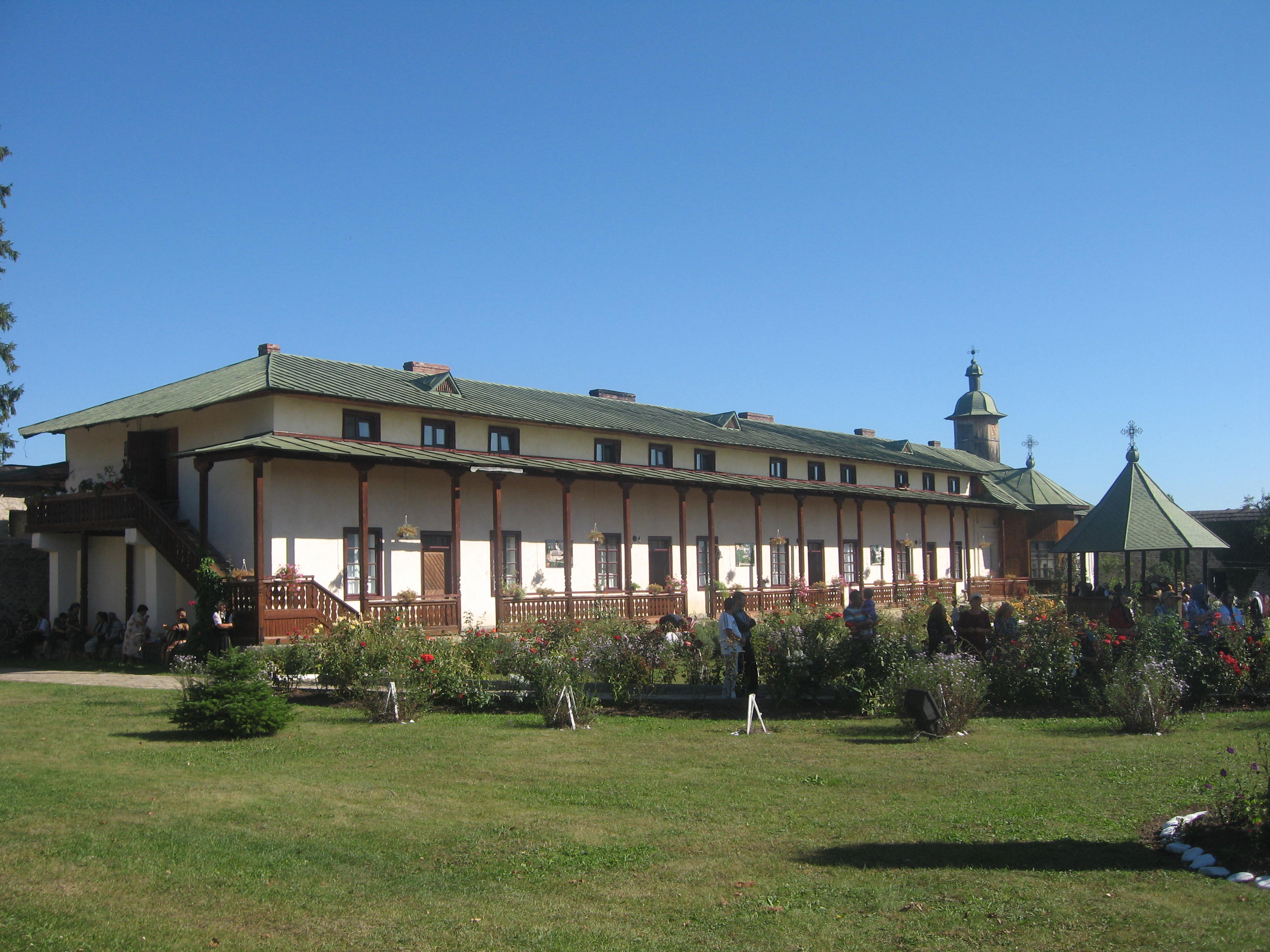
Râșca Monastery

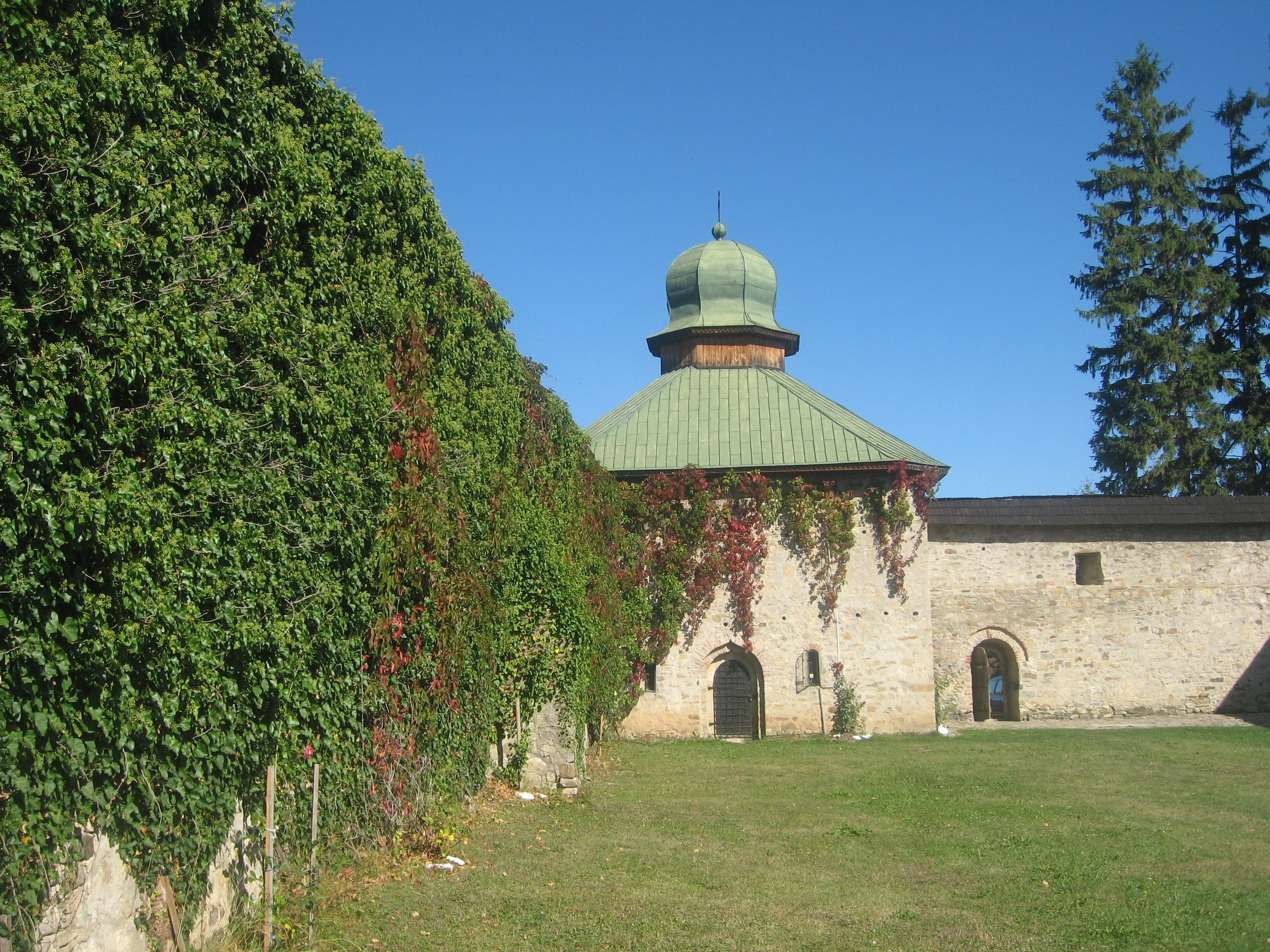
Râșca Monastery

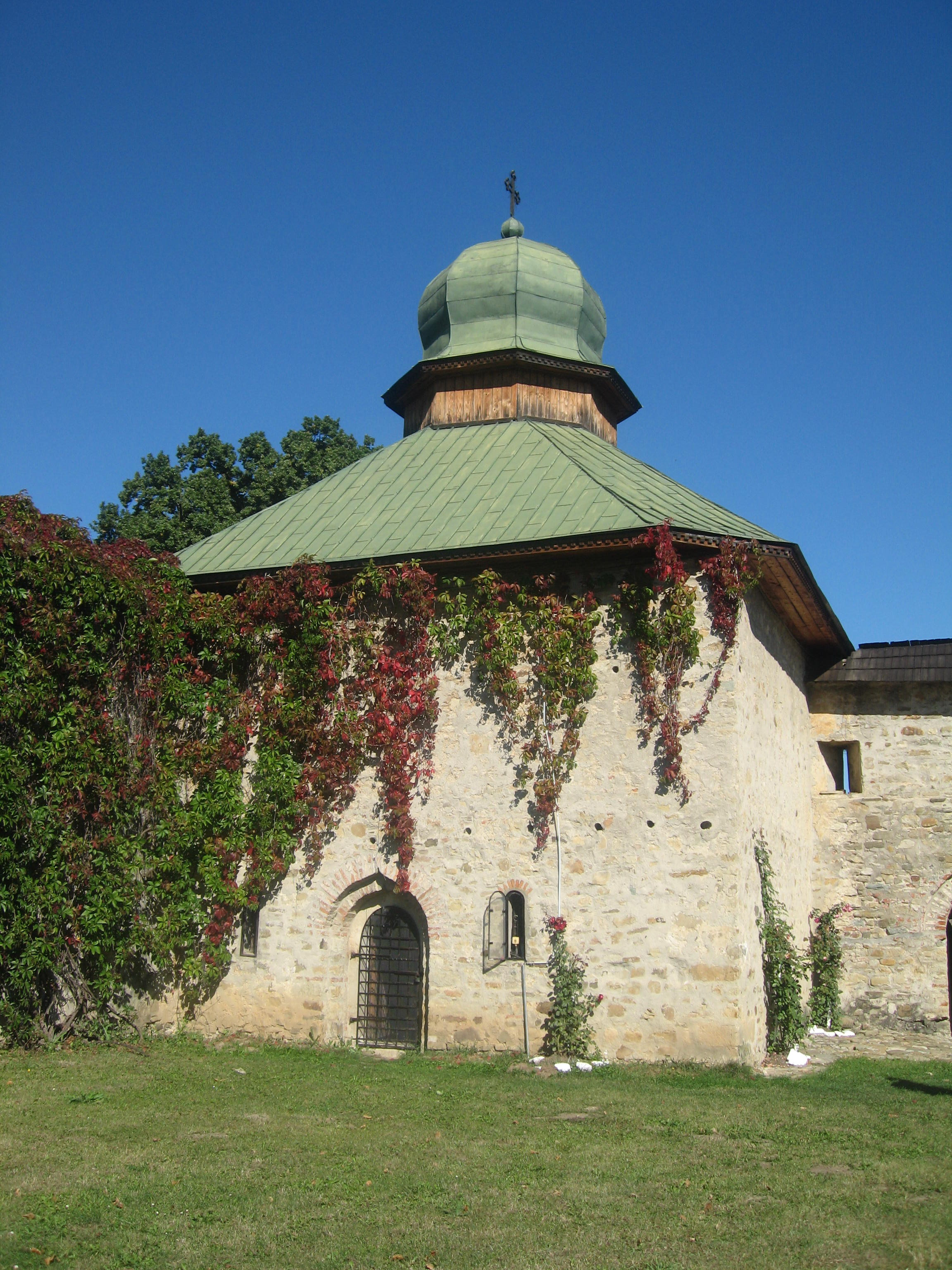
Râșca Monastery

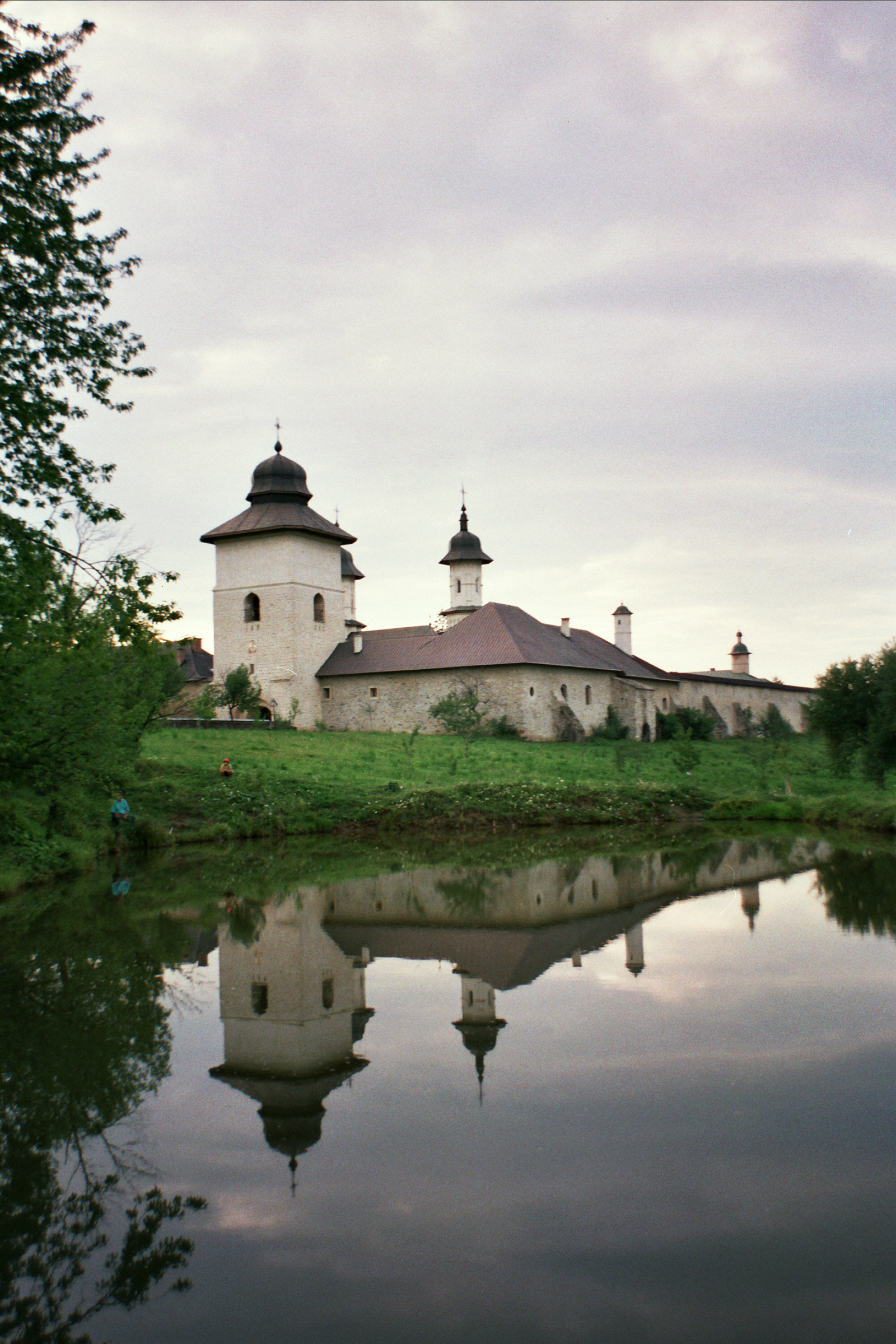
Râșca Monastery

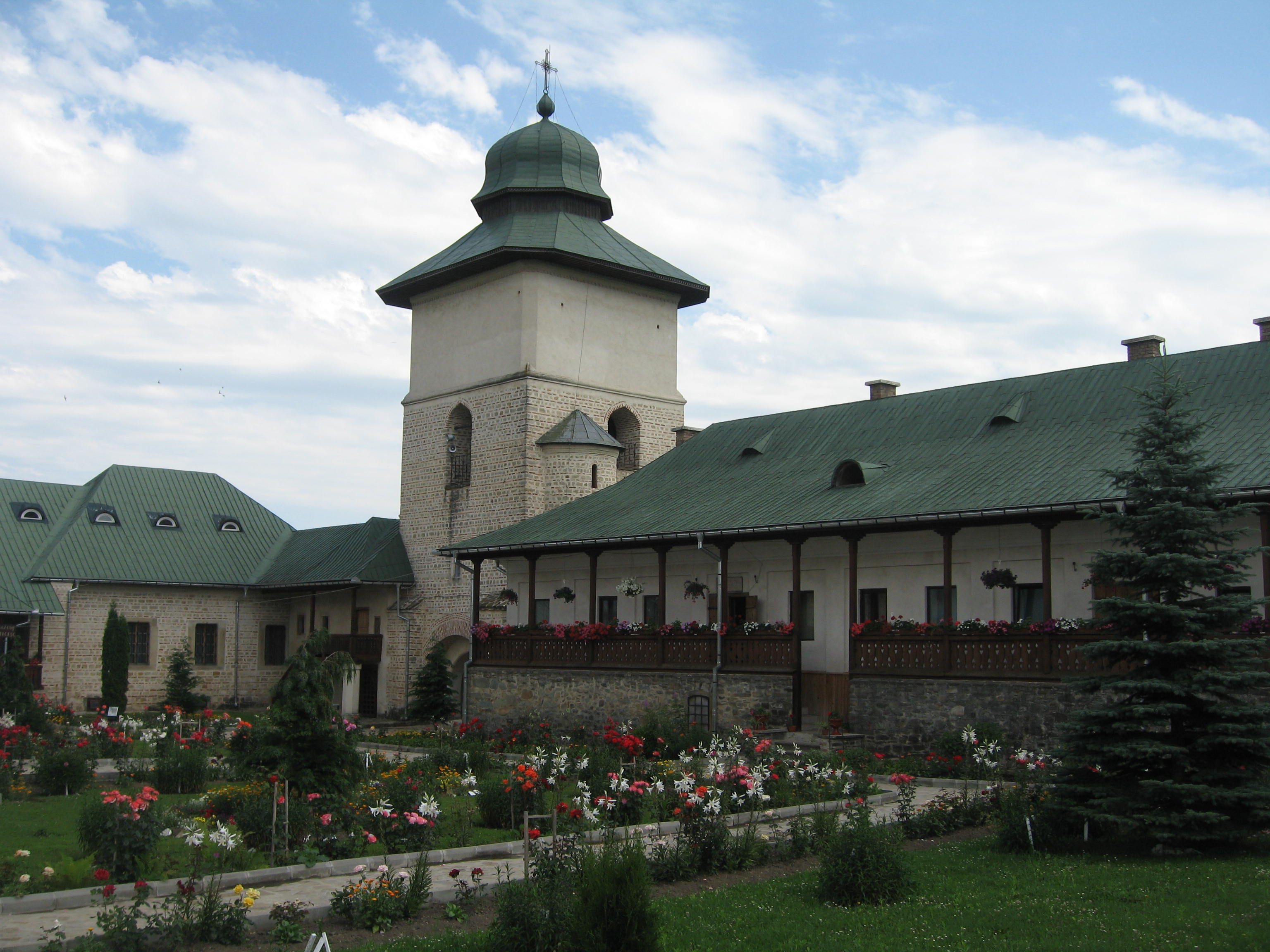
Râșca Monastery

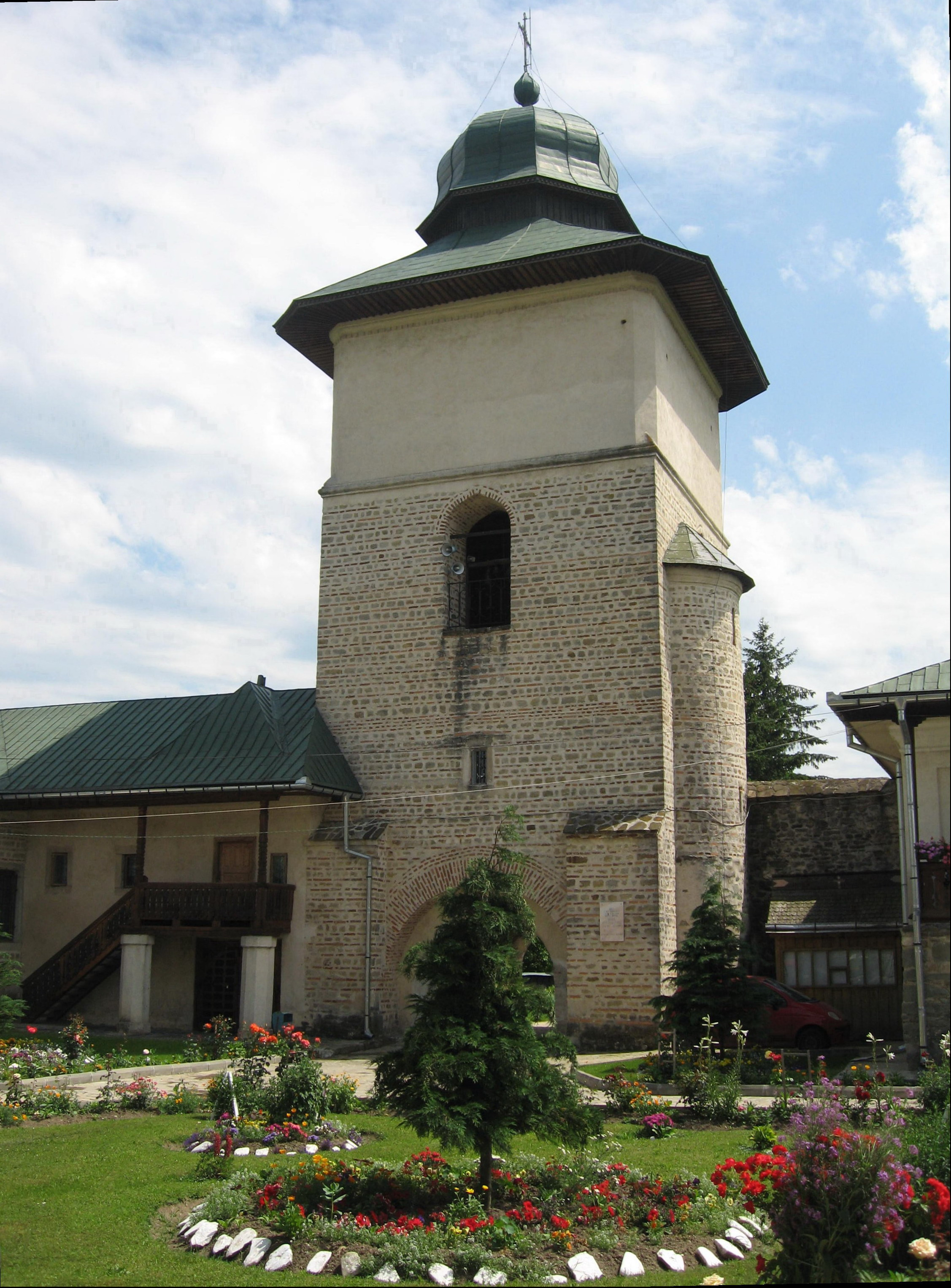
Râșca Monastery

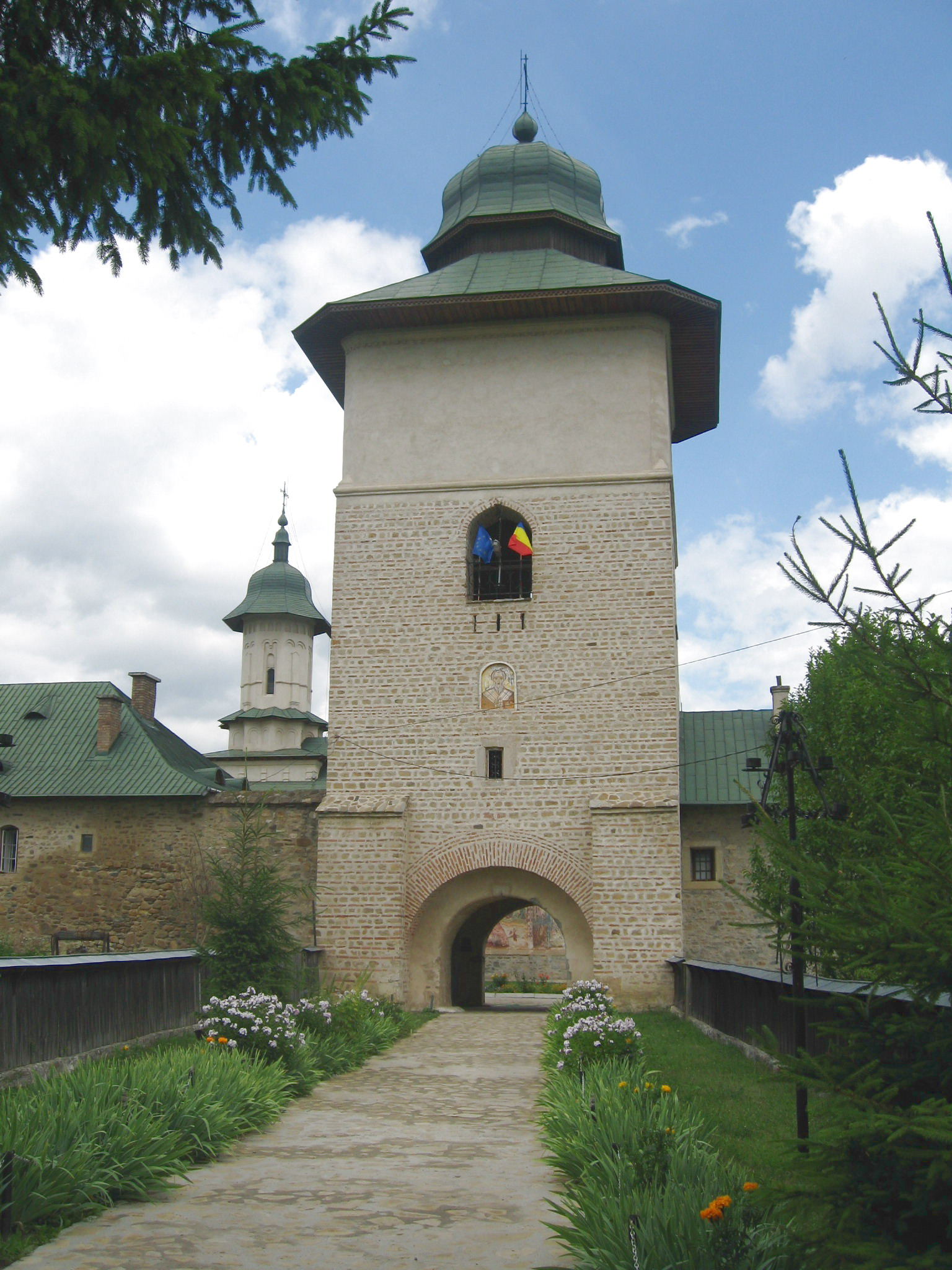
Râșca Monastery

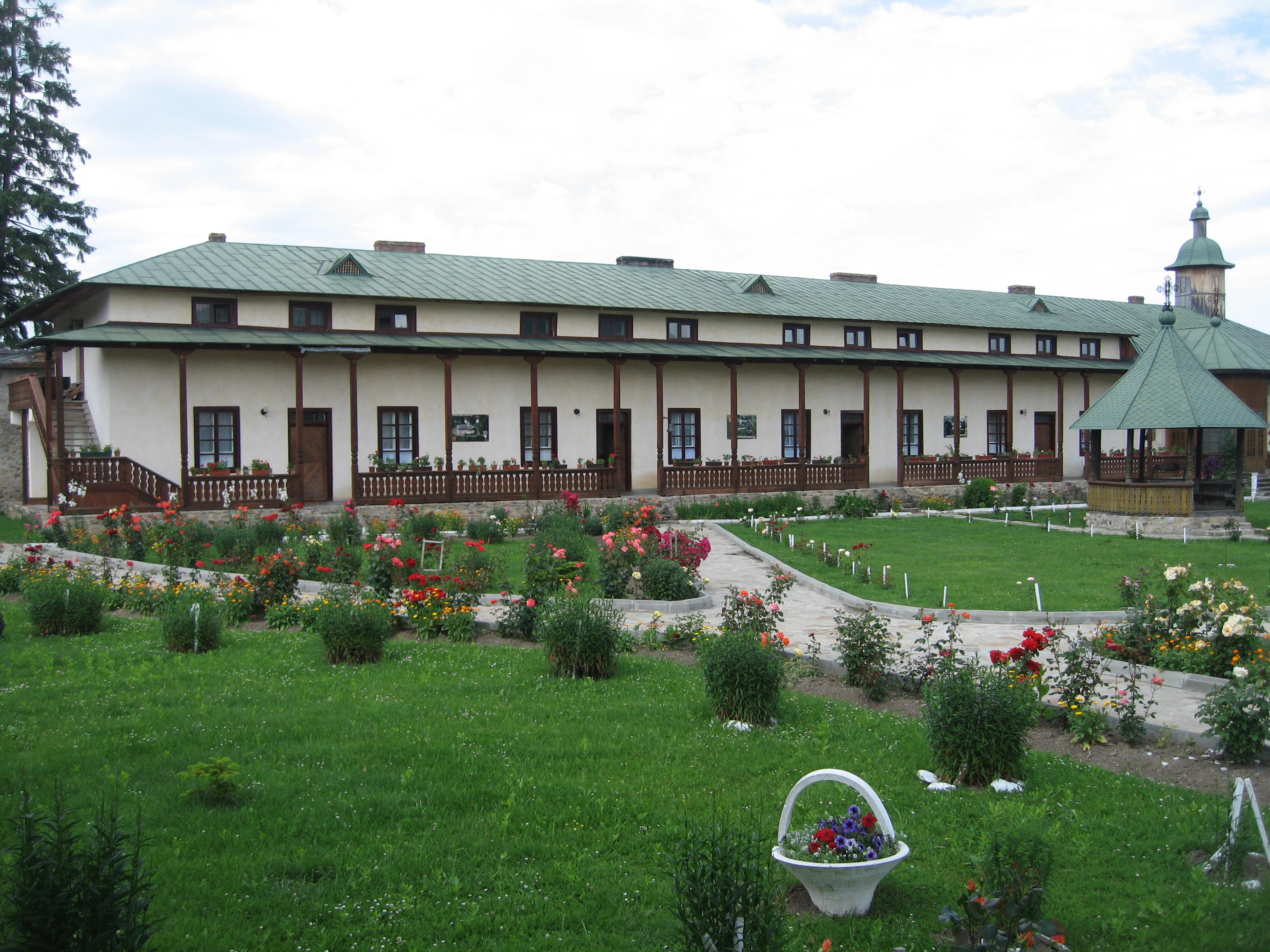
Râșca Monastery
