= Pruili =

Priuli is a surname. Notable people with the surname include:

- Giovanni Priuli (c. 1575–1626), Italian composer and organist
- Girolamo Priuli (1476–1547), Venetian noble
- Girolamo Priuli (1486–1567), Venetian noble
- Lorenzo Priuli (1489–1559), Doge of Venice
