= Pietro Loredan =

Pietro Loredan may refer to:

- Pietro Loredan (admiral) (1372–1438)
- Pietro Loredan (doge) (1481/2–1570)
