= Cecilia Contarini =

Dogaressa of Venice

Dogaressa of Venice
- Reign: 11 June 1577 - 3 March 1578
- Predecessor: Loredana Marcello
- Successor: Morosina Morosini
- Died: after 1578; Republic of Venice
- Spouse: Sebastiano Venier (m. 1544; died 1578)

Cecilia Contarini (fl. 1578) was the Dogaressa of Venice by marriage to the Doge Sebastiano Venier (r. 1577-1578).

She married the future doge in 1544. Along with her spouse, she reportedly preferred to avoid ceremony and public life and lived secluded in the palace. She greeted officials in the doge's stead, such as when that Brescian embassy came full of "gratitude for precious services and in token of the devotion and infinite love felt for his Serenity by all the citizens of our city"; they were received by the dogaressa without ceremony, who told them: "I much fear he will be unwilling to accept your offering but I will go and hear what he says." Unlike other dowager dogaressas she was not expected to become a nun but provided with a pension and provisions similar to that of Zilia Dandolo, and was one of three dogaressas depicted in the Cerimoniali (1464 - 1592) alongside Zilia Dandolo and Loredana Marcello.
