= Alvise I Mocenigo =

Doge of Venice from 1570 to 1577

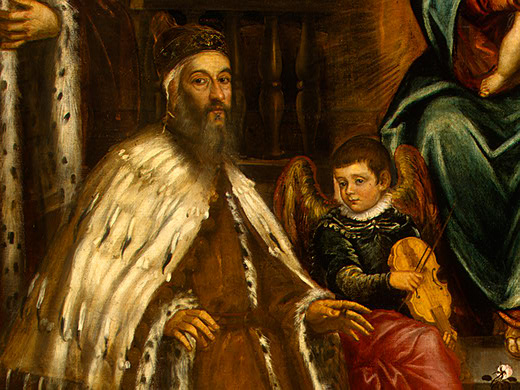
- Detail of painting by Tintoretto showing Alvise I Mocenigo and his family before the Madonna

Doge of Venice
- In office 1570–1577
- Preceded by: Pietro Loredan
- Succeeded by: Sebastiano Venier

Personal details
- Born: 1507
- Died: 4 June 1577 (aged 69–70)

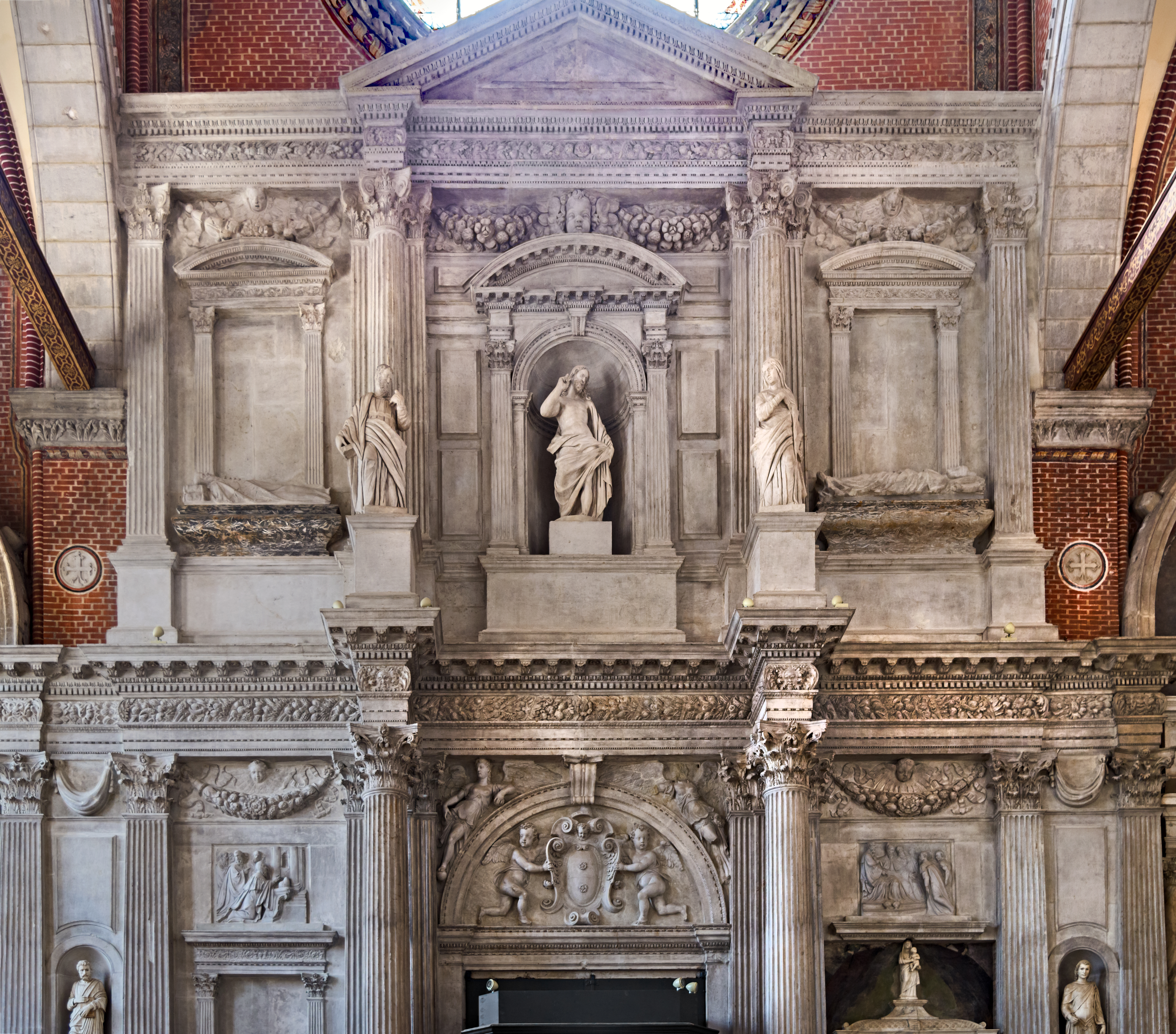
Tomb of Alvise Mocenigo

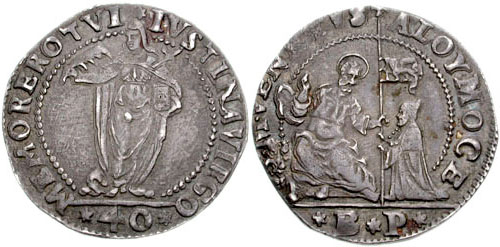
Giustina (a type of medal-coin) of Alvise I Mocenigo, with the value of 40 soldi.

Alvise I Mocenigo (26 October 1507 – 4 June 1577) was the 85th doge of Venice from 1570 to 1577.

An admirer of antiquities, Mocenigo was a diplomat of the Republic of Venice at the court of emperor Charles V (1545), to pope Paul IV (1557) and again at the imperial court (1564). In 1567 he was a candidate to the election as doge, but lost to Pietro Loredan. He participated again when the latter died, and was elected as doge of Venice in 1570. His dogaressa was the scholar Loredana Marcello (d. 1572).

At the time of his accession, the Ottoman Empire was preparing to wage war against Venice: the conflict broke out in 1570, and Venice lost the fortresses of Nicosia and Famagusta in Cyprus. Despite the victory of the Christian coalition in the Battle of Lepanto, Venice was forced to sign an unfavorable treaty of peace with the Turks (7 March 1573), by which it recognized the loss of Cyprus.

During his reign Venice was visited by the new King of France, Henry III, in July 1574.

== Death ==
Alvise I Mocenigo died on November 27, 1577, of suicide by hanging. He was interred in the Basilica di San Giovanni e Paolo, a traditional burial place of the doges.

== In fiction ==
Due to the timing of events in William Shakespeare's 1603 tragedy Othello, it very possible he is the "Duke of Venice" who is a supporting character in the play (as the play is set during the Ottoman-Venetian War).

== See also ==
- Mocenigo family

== Sources ==
Political offices
Preceded by Pietro Loredan	Doge of Venice; 1570–1577	Succeeded by Sebastiano Venier
