= Sebastiano Venier =

Doge of Venice from 1577 to 1578

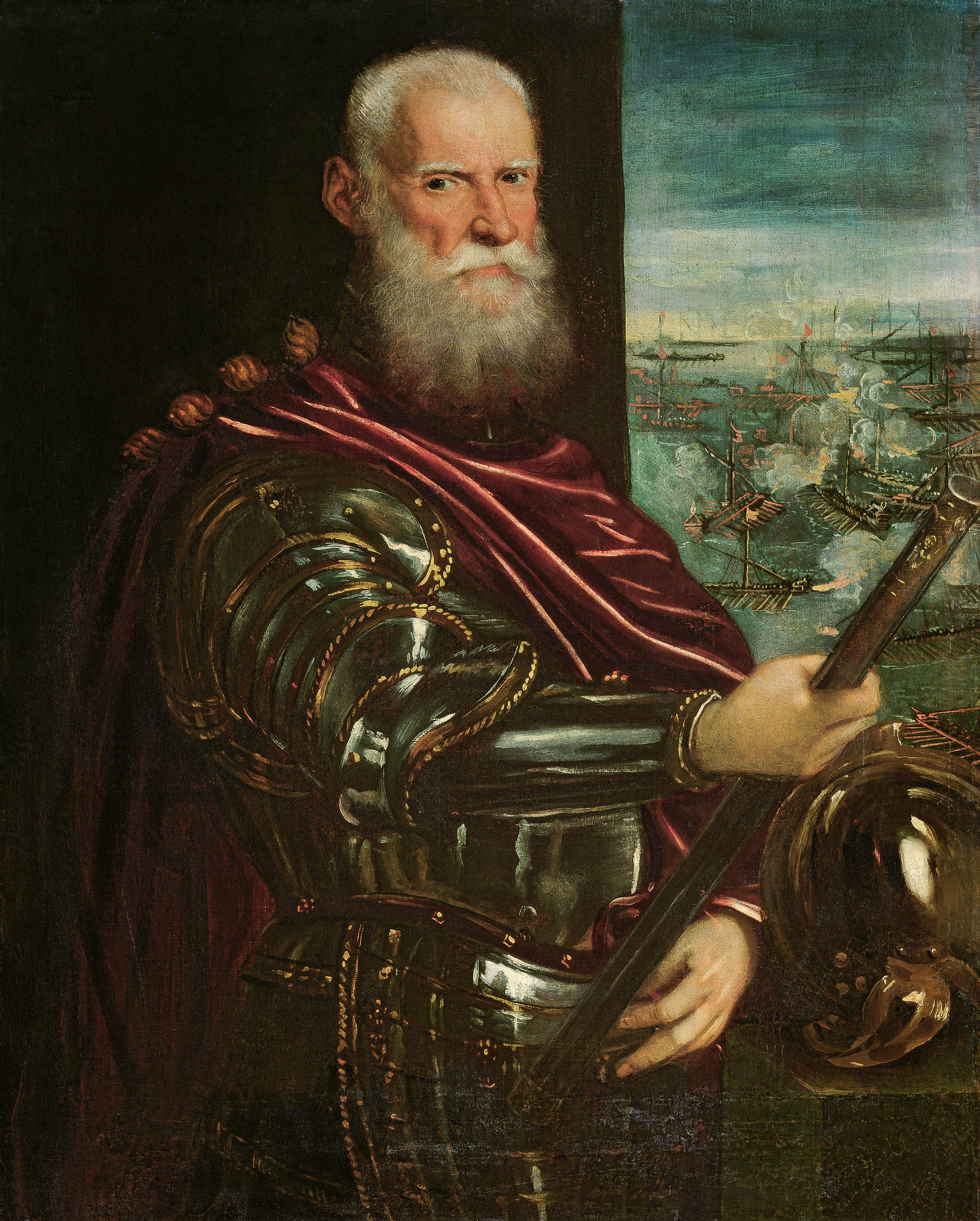
- Sebastiano Venier at the Battle of Lepanto. Painting by Tintoretto

Doge of Venice
- Reign: 1577 – 3 March 1578
- Predecessor: Alvise I Mocenigo
- Successor: Nicolò da Ponte
- Born: c. 1496; Venice, Republic of Venice
- Died: 3 March 1578 (aged 81–82); Venice, Republic of Venice
- Burial: Basilica Santi Giovanni e Paolo
- Spouse: Cecilia Contarini
- House: House of Venier
- Father: Mosè Venier
- Mother: Elena Donà
- Religion: Roman Catholicism

Sebastiano Venier (or Veniero) (c. 1496 – 3 March 1578) was the 86th Doge of Venice from 11 June 1577 to 3 March 1578. He is best remembered in his role as the Venetian admiral at the Battle of Lepanto.

== Biography ==
Venier was born in Venice around 1496. He was a son of Moisè (Mosè) Venier and Elena Donà, and a nephew of Zuan Francesco Venier, Co-Lord of Cerigo. He was a paternal grandson of Moisé Venier (ca. 1412 - ca. 1476). He was the great-great-great-grandson of Pietro Venier, Governor of Cerigo.

He worked as a lawyer from a very early age, though without holding formal qualifications, and subsequently was an administrator for the government of the Republic of Venice. In 1570 he was procurator of St Mark's and, in the December of the same year, capitano generale da Mar of the Venetian fleet in the new war against the Ottoman Turks, substituting Girolamo Zane.

He was the commander of the Venetian contingent at Battle of Lepanto (7 October 1571), in which the Christian League decisively defeated the Turks. After the peace he returned to Venice as a very popular figure, and in 1577, at the age of 81, he was unanimously elected Doge.

He was married to Cecilia Contarini, who bore him a daughter, Elena Venier. He also had two illegitimate sons, Filippo and Marco. Venier later provided Filippo with a benefice and Marco, who became a functionary of the chancellery, with a post in Dalmatia.

Sebastiano Venier died on 3 March 1578.

He was interred in the Santa Maria degli Angeli of Murano, instead of the family's tomb, as he had expressed in 1568 in his will. However, in 1907 his remains were moved in the Basilica di San Giovanni e Paolo, a traditional burial place of the doges.

== Relations ==
There is a possibility that he was a first cousin once removed of Cecilia Venier-Baffo, known as Nurbanu Sultan after her conversion to Islam, daughter of his first cousin Nicolò Venier, Lord of Paros. She was abducted during the Ottoman–Venetian War (1537–1540) and sent to the Ottoman Sultan Suleiman the Magnificent in order to counter the ascension of Roxelana. She became eventually the wife of his son Selim II and the mother of Murad III, from whom descend all succeeding Sultans.

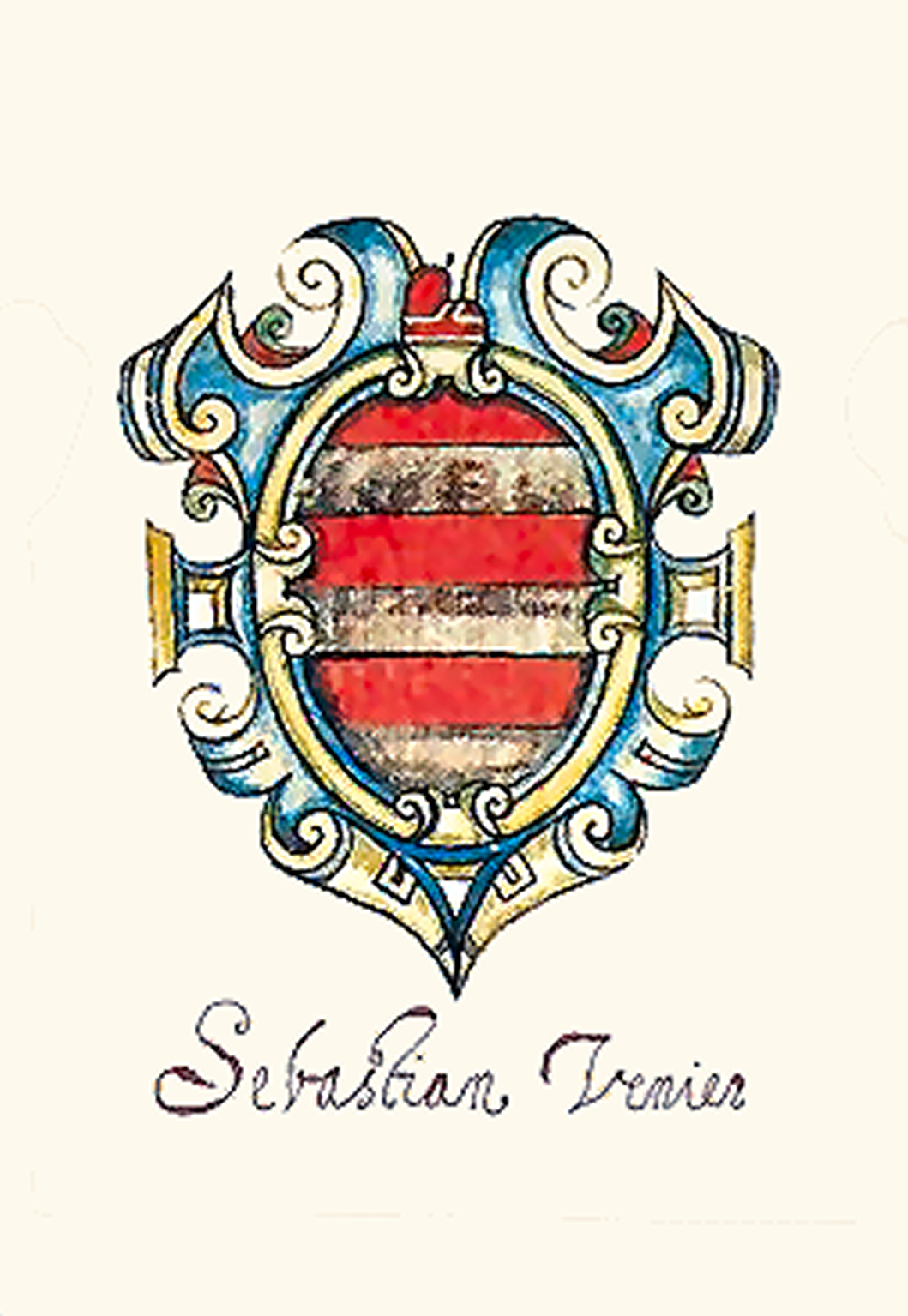
Coat of arms of Sebastiano Venier

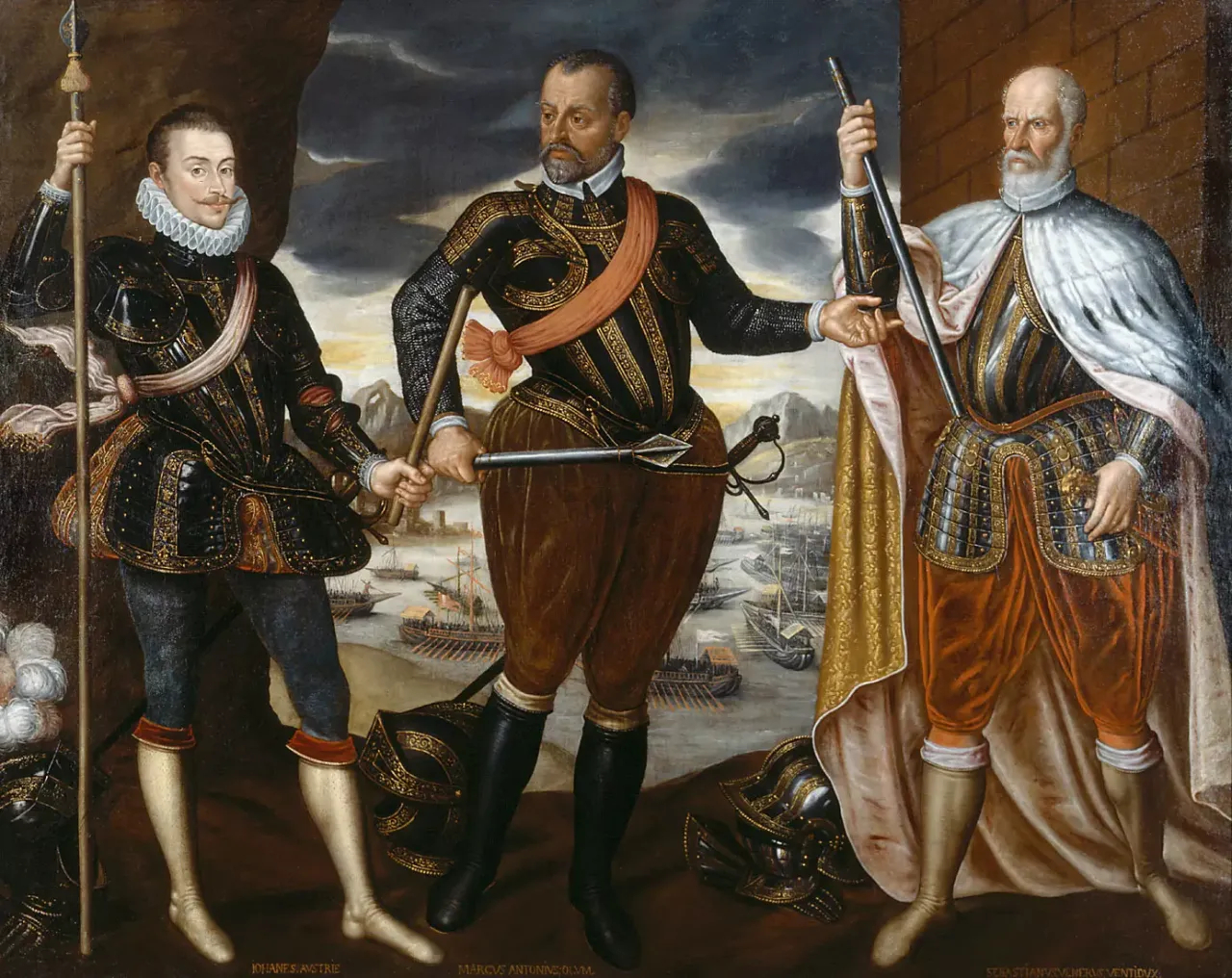
The Victors of Lepanto (from left: John of Austria, Marcantonio Colonna, Sebastiano Venier)

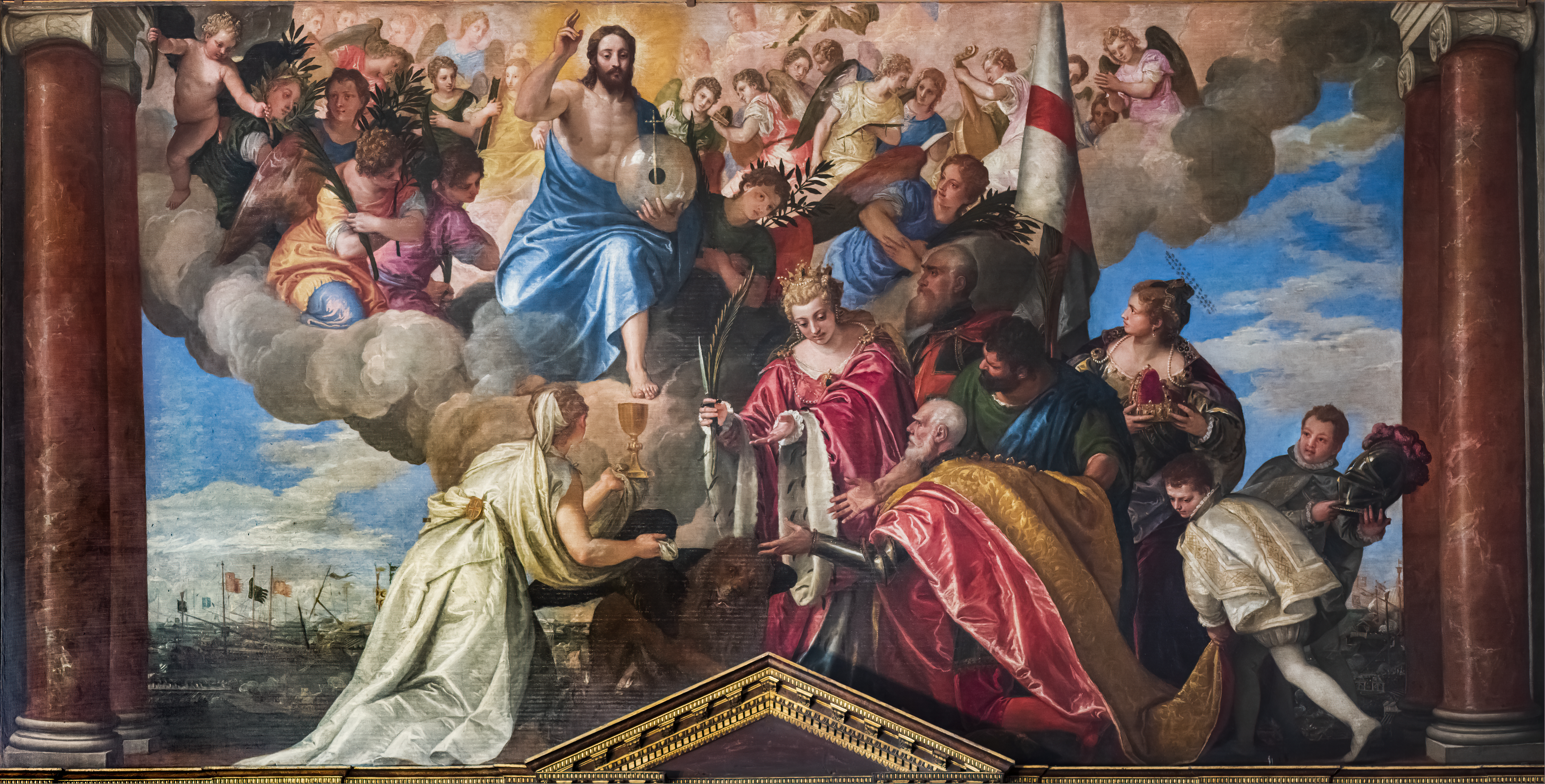
Votive Portrait of Doge Sebastiano Venier by Veronese

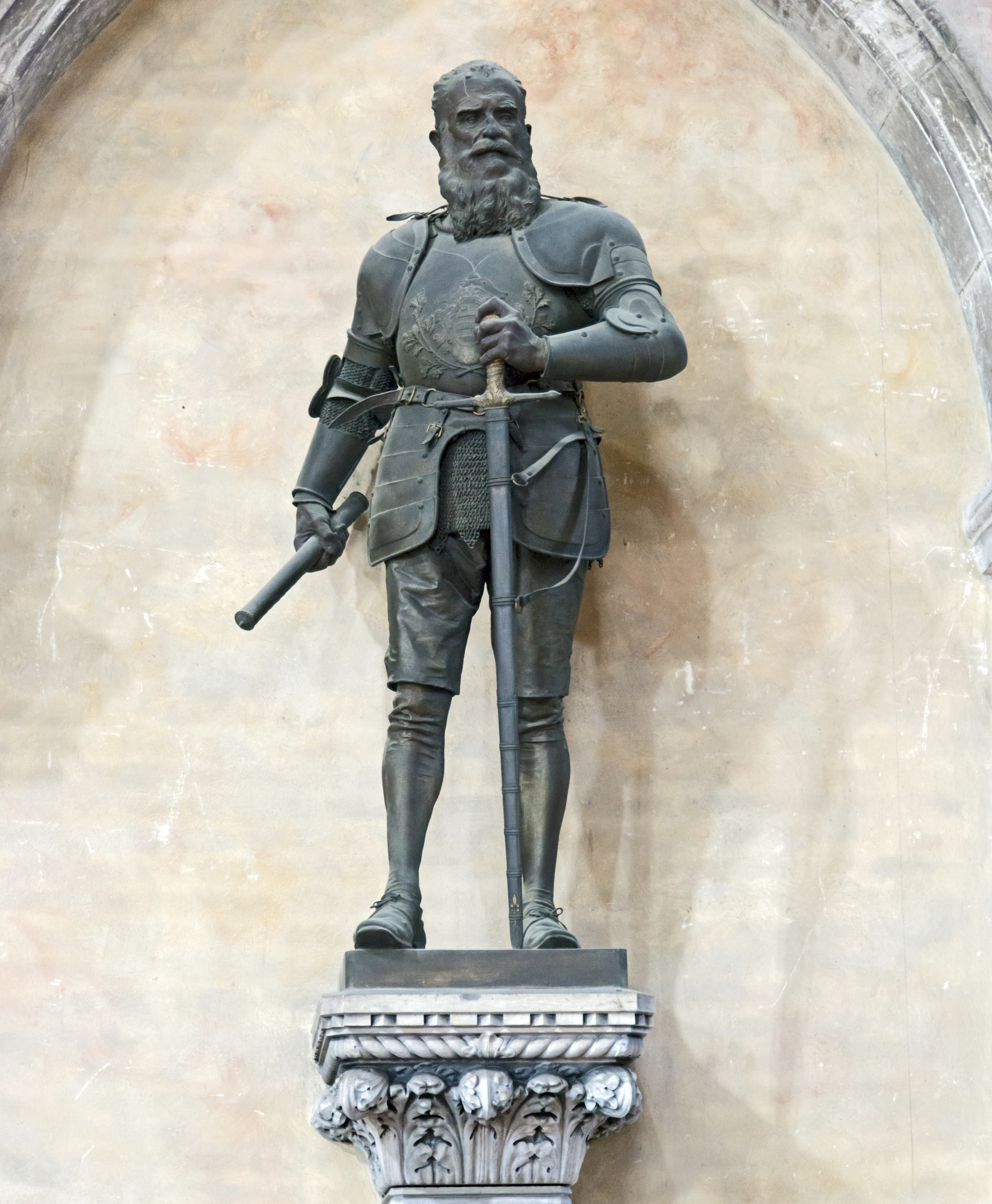
Funeral effigy in the Basilica di San Giovanni e Paolo

Political offices
| Preceded by Alvise I Mocenigo | Doge of Venice; 1577–1578 | Succeeded by Nicolò da Ponte |
