= Portrait of Doge Pietro Loredan =

Painting by Jacopo Tintoretto in the Kimbell Art Museum

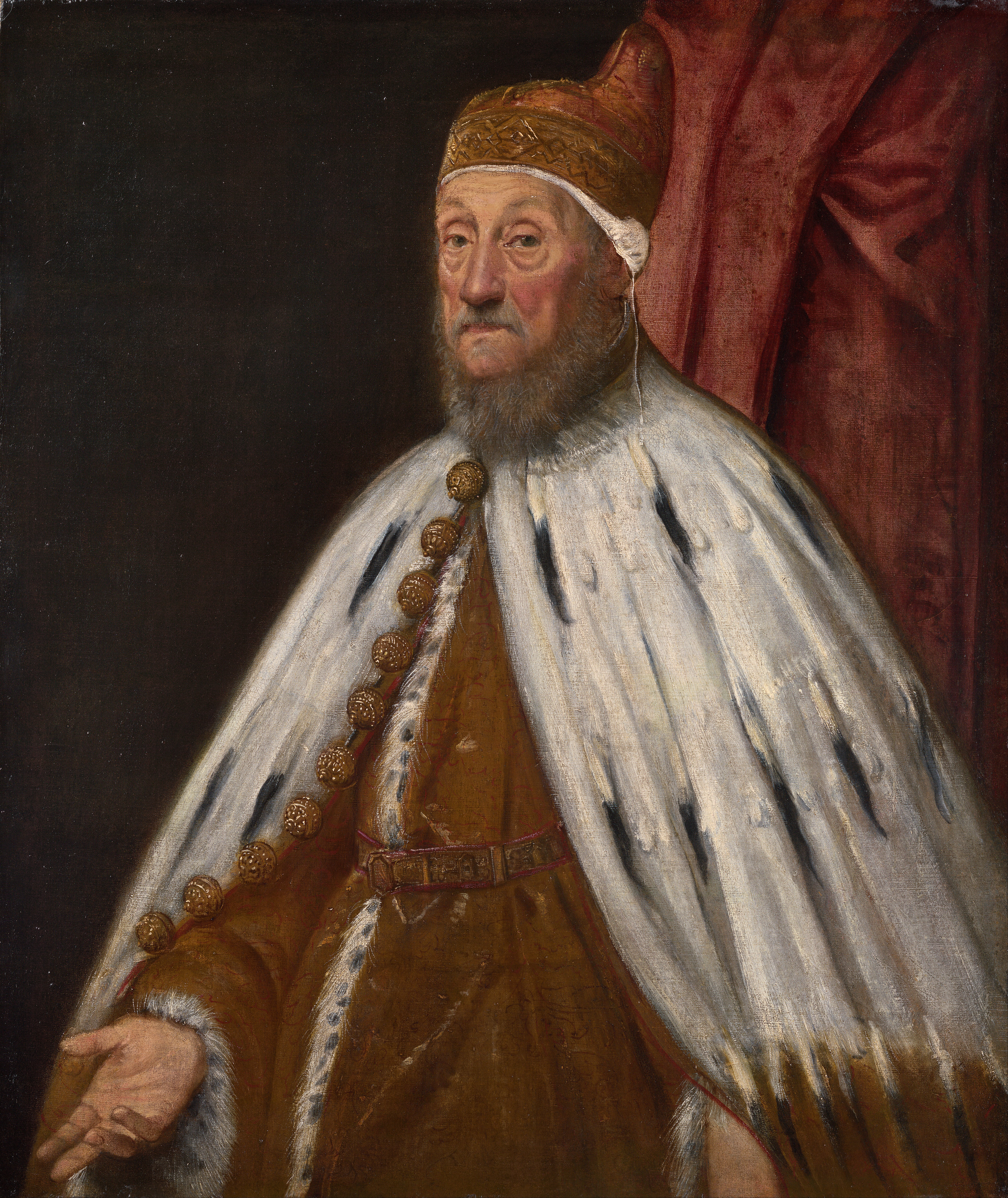
- Artist: Tintoretto
- Year: c. 1567–1570
- Medium: Oil on canvas
- Movement: Mannerism, Venetian School, Renaissance
- Subject: Doge Pietro Loredan
- Dimensions: 109.5 cm × 93.0 cm (43.1 in × 36.6 in)
- Location: National Gallery of Victoria, Melbourne

The Portrait of Doge Pietro Loredan is a series of paintings by the Italian Renaissance master Jacopo Robusti, more commonly known as Tintoretto. The portraits were painted around 1567–1570, while Pietro Loredan reigned as the Doge of Venice. The two still-existing versions of the portrait are on display at the Kimbell Art Museum in Fort Worth, Texas, and at the National Gallery of Victoria in Melbourne, Australia.

== Description ==
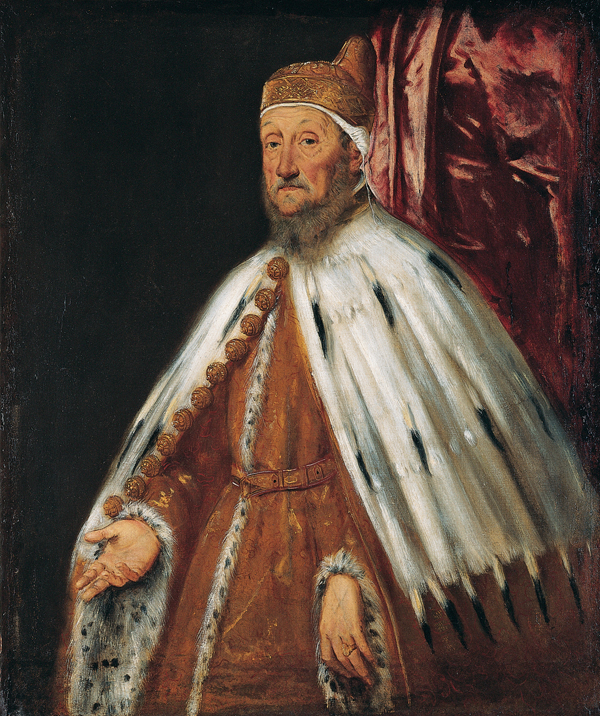
The Kimbell Art Museum version.

In 1567, Pietro Loredan (1481/82–1570), a member of the House of Loredan, of one of Venice's most prominent and ancient families, was elected Doge, the highest office of the Republic of Venice. Tradition dictated that a newly elected Doge's official portrait be created by the leading artist of the time. On this occasion, the task was entrusted to Tintoretto, who produced the painting seen here.

Loredan is depicted wearing the ceremonial robes of his position, complete with the distinctive buttons on his cloak and the unique corno ducale—a crown reserved exclusively for the Doge, inspired by the Phrygian cap. The portrait is slightly more than a half-length depiction, with Loredan standing, lending a dynamic quality to the composition.

A masterful portraitist, Tintoretto excelled at capturing the essence of his subjects. This piece, painted with a delicate touch, is particularly notable for its expressive portrayal of the Doge's face. The elderly Loredan's kind eyes and weary expression convey wisdom, experience, and benevolence—qualities for which he was well-regarded in his time. Tintoretto’s energetic style is evident in the rapid, assured brushstrokes used to depict the ermine cape, adding vitality to the painting.

Tintoretto created numerous portraits of Loredan, incorporating his likeness into various large-scale works, including ceremonial scenes in the Doge's Palace. Given the demands of office, the Doge likely sat for a single portrait session, which Tintoretto used as the basis for subsequent depictions. The NGV painting, filled with personality and sensitivity, was likely painted from life and served as the studio modello—a primary version kept for reference in creating additional works.

X-radiographs of the painting reveal subtle but significant alterations to Loredan’s posture and clothing. Adjustments include repositioning the buttons, altering the coat’s line, raising the belt, and softening the alignment of his shoulders and neck. Initially, the Doge’s stance was more formal and upright, but these changes give him a more relaxed and natural appearance. Whether these modifications were made at the artist's discretion or at Loredan’s request remains uncertain. However, their presence underscores the painting's importance as the studio modello.

This is particularly fortunate since the official portrait of Loredan that once hung in the Doge's Palace, modeled on this work, was tragically destroyed in the 1577 fire.
