= Zilia Dandolo =

Dogaressa of Venice

Zilia Dandolo (died 13 October 1566) was the Dogaressa of Venice by marriage to the Doge Lorenzo Priuli (ruled 1556–1559).

== Life ==
She was the daughter of Marco Dandolo and related to the doges Andrea Dandolo and Arigo Dandolo. She married Priuli in 1526 in what was considered as almost an unequal match, as she was considered more high born than he. Her daughter was painted by Titian in "The Annunciation" as Mary. Zilia hosted many parties in the famous Palazzo Priuli.

=== Dogaressa ===
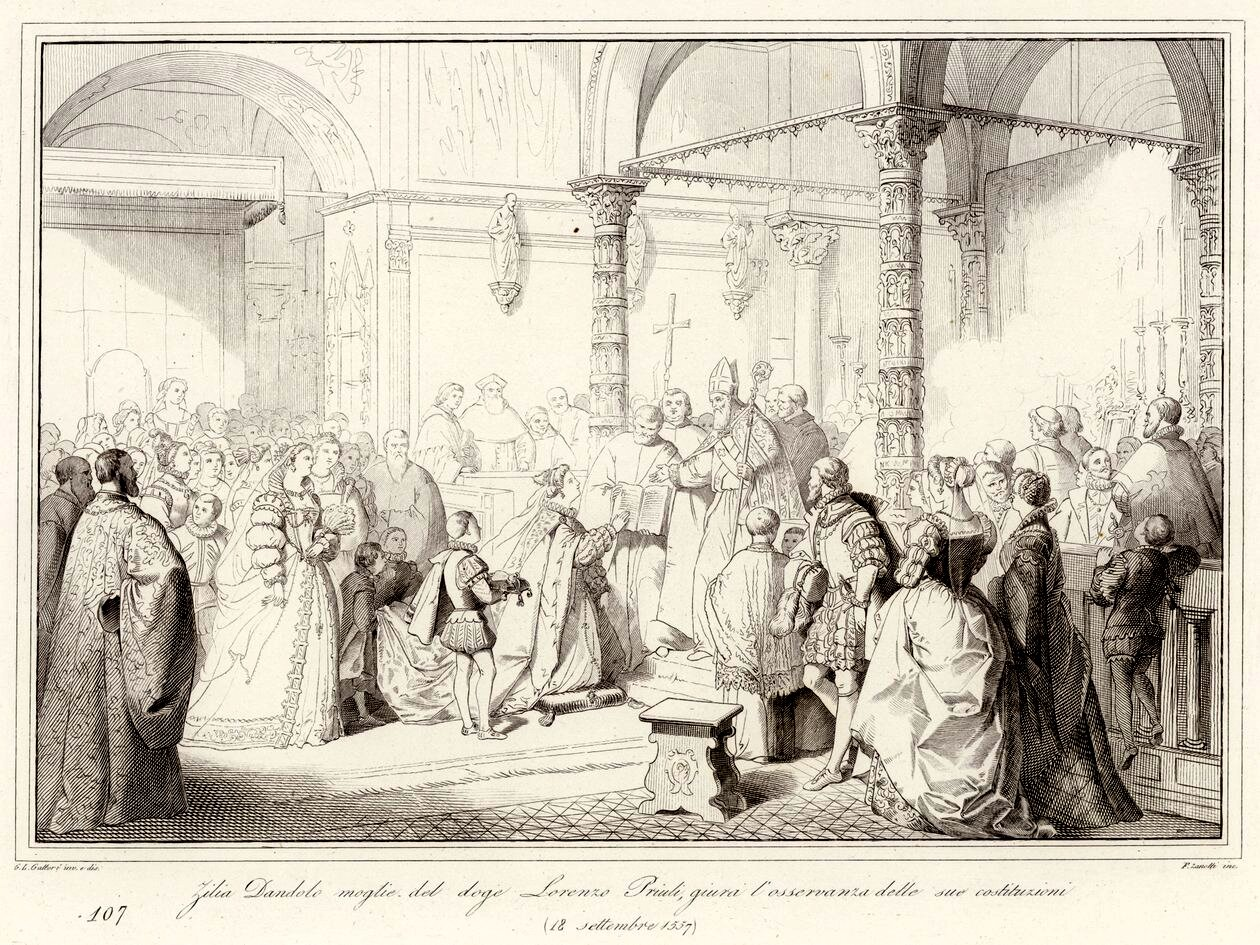
Zilia Dandolo takes the oath of office

She was described as the leading female aristocrat and the most respected female noble in Venice, and the election of her spouse to doge is attributed to her.

When her spouse was elected doge in 1556, the council decided that Zilia should be crowned. This was somewhat remarkable, as no dogaressa had been crowned since Taddea Michiel in 1478. Her Grand Entry and coronation on 18 September 1557 set the pattern for future ceremonies of the same kind.

=== Later life ===
Zilia was given many honors from the state unknown to other dogaressas. As a widow in 1559, she was granted the title of princess, her own court and pension from the state: when she appeared in public as dowager dogaressa, she was accompanied by courtiers, and was entitled to wear state robes. This was not usually granted a dogaressa, who was by custom normally expected to enter a convent as a widow. Dogaressa Cecilia Contarini were given the same honors in 1578.

== Legacy ==
In the Cerimoniali (1464–1592), she is one of only three dogaressas depicted in state robes as widows: the other two being Cecilia Contarini and Loredana Marcello.

A new form of glass was named after her: La Zilia.

Preceded by Alicia Giustiniani	Dogaressa of Venice; 1556–1559	Loredana Marcello
