= Loredana Marcello =

Dogaress of Venice

- Born: 1518; Venice
- Died: December 12, 1572; Venice
- Known for: Formulas and recipes for use against plagues (now lost), model educated and cultivated Venetian Renaissance woman, Dogaressa of Venice
- Spouse: Alvise I Mocenigo
- Scientific career
- Fields: Botany

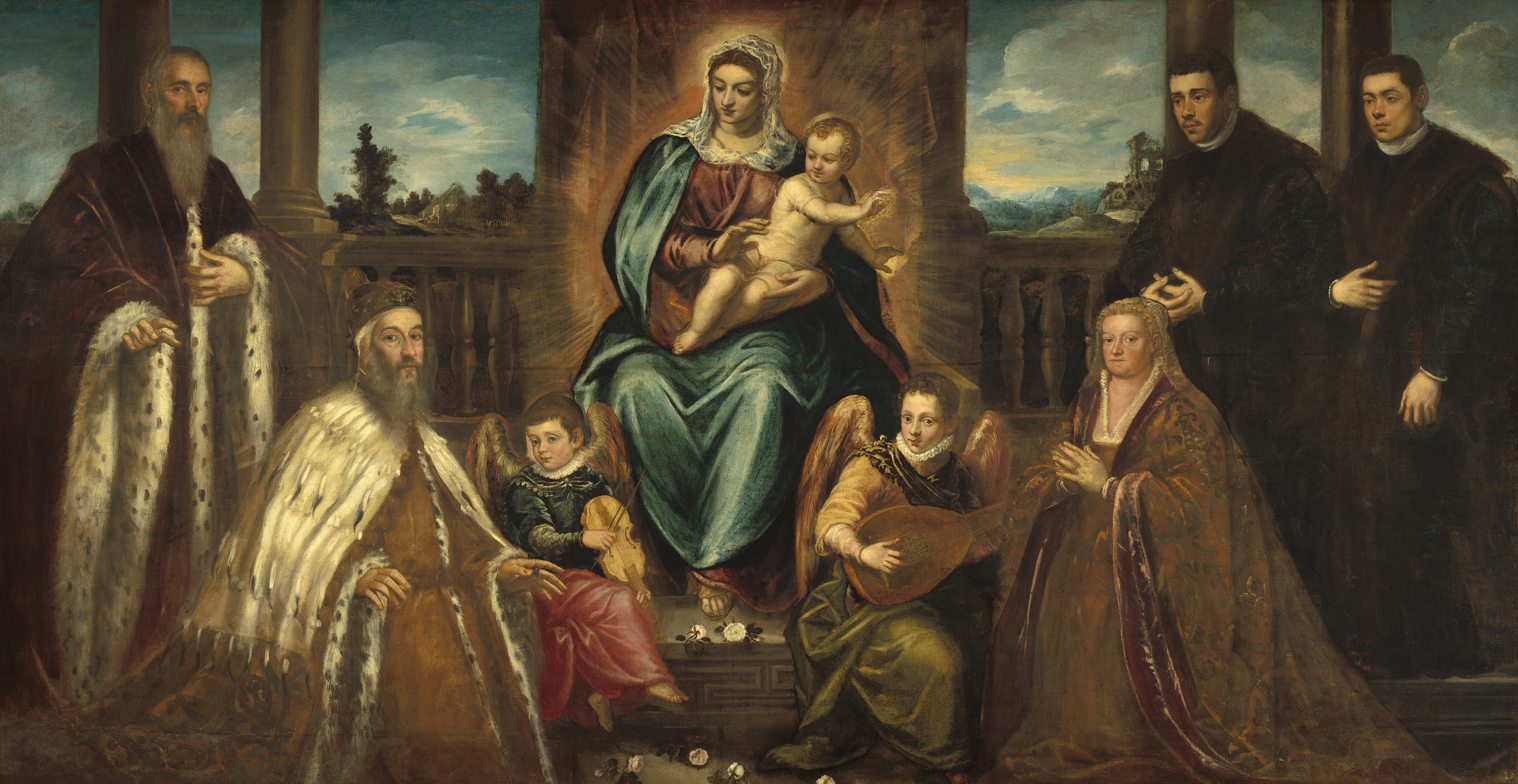
Doge Alvise Mocenigo and Family before the Madonna and Child

Loredana Marcello (1518 – 12 December 1572) was a Dogaressa of Venice by marriage to the Doge Alvise I Mocenigo (r. 1570-1577). She was an author of letters and poetry and studied botany, and was regarded as a model of an educated and cultivated renaissance woman in contemporary Venice.

== Life ==
She was the daughter of Giovanni Alvise Marcello and married Mocenigo in 1533. Together with her sisters Bianca, Daria and Maria, she was referred to as fiore de'l secolo (from Italian, flower of the century) and regarded to represent the ideal of the educated renaissance woman for the nobility in Venice, and was, as multi talented, referred to as Giantessa di merito.

She was regarded a scholar, described as attractive and educated, and was the author of letters and poetry. She also studied botany, and was a student of a professor of the Biological Garden in Padua, Melchiorre Giuliandino. She was known for the formulas and recipes she developed for use against plagues. Presumably these were palliatives rather than cures. Her work is lost, but her botanical research it is noted to have been consulted and put to good use during the epidemic which appeared in Venice few years after her death (1575).

She became dogaressa upon the election of her spouse as doge in 1570, but died two years later. In the Cerimoniali (1464- 1592), she is one of only three dogaressas depicted: the other two being Cecilia Contarini and Zilia Dandolo.

Ottavio Maggio wrote the Oratio in funeralibus Laurace Mocceniccs upon her death.

Amaden in the Archivio privato de Marcelli described her:

"She was remarkable for her constancy, both in the experiences of adversity and in the distractions of prosperity, judicious and discreet in the supervision of :her household, reverent and charitable in her church duties, benevolent to her relatives and to her dependents, in a word, she was a most virtuous and noble Princess."

== See also ==
- Timeline of women in science

Preceded by Zilia Dandolo	Dogaressa of Venice; 1570–1572	Cecilia Contarini
