= Lorenzo Priuli =

Doge of Venice from 1556 to 1559

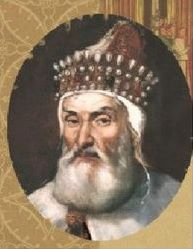

Lifetime Doge of the Most Serene Republic of Venice
- In office 1556–1559
- Preceded by: Francesco Venier
- Succeeded by: Girolamo Priuli

Personal details
- Born: 1489 Venice
- Died: 17 August 1559 (aged 69–70) Venice
- Spouse: Zilia Dandolo

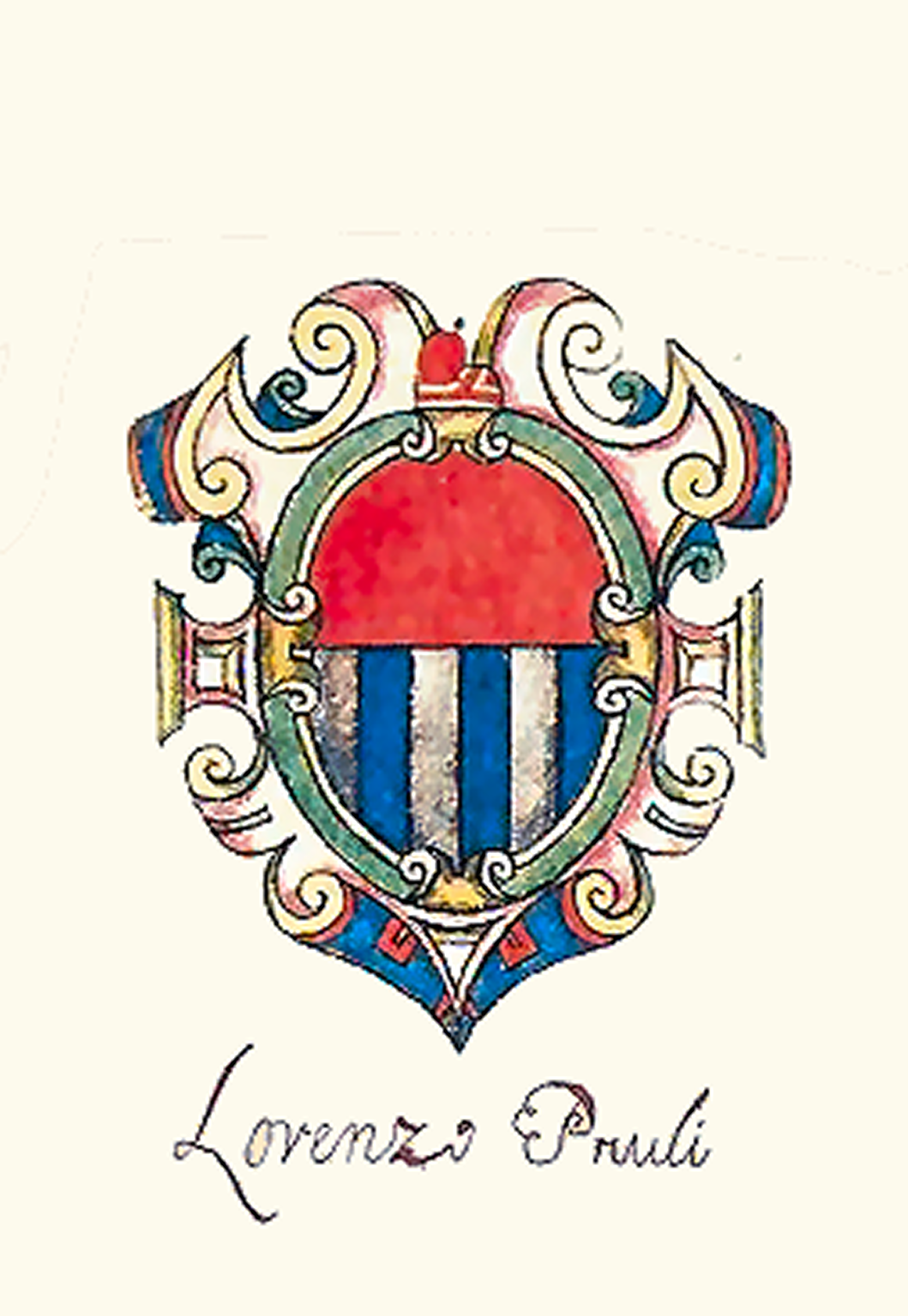
Lorenzo Priuli's coat of arms

Lorenzo Priuli (1489 – 17 August 1559) was the 82nd Doge of Venice. Born a member of the Priuli family, he reigned from 1556 to 1559. His dogaressa was Zilia Dandolo (d. 1566).

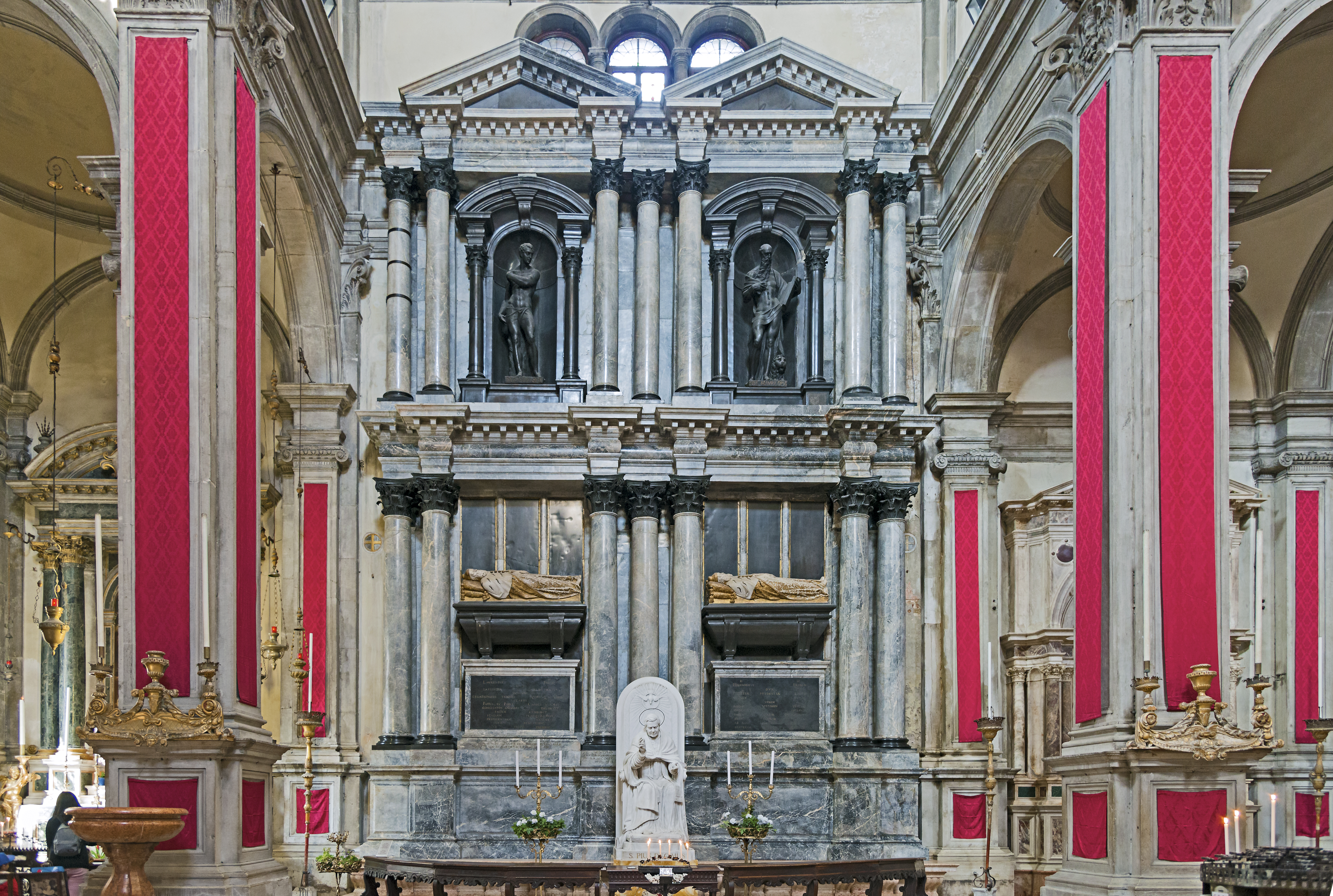
Monument and tombs of Doge Lorenzo and Girolamo Priuli

Political offices
Preceded by Francesco Venier	Doge of Venice; 1556–1559	Succeeded by Girolamo Priuli
