= Pietro Loredan (doge) =

Doge of Venice from 1567 to 1570

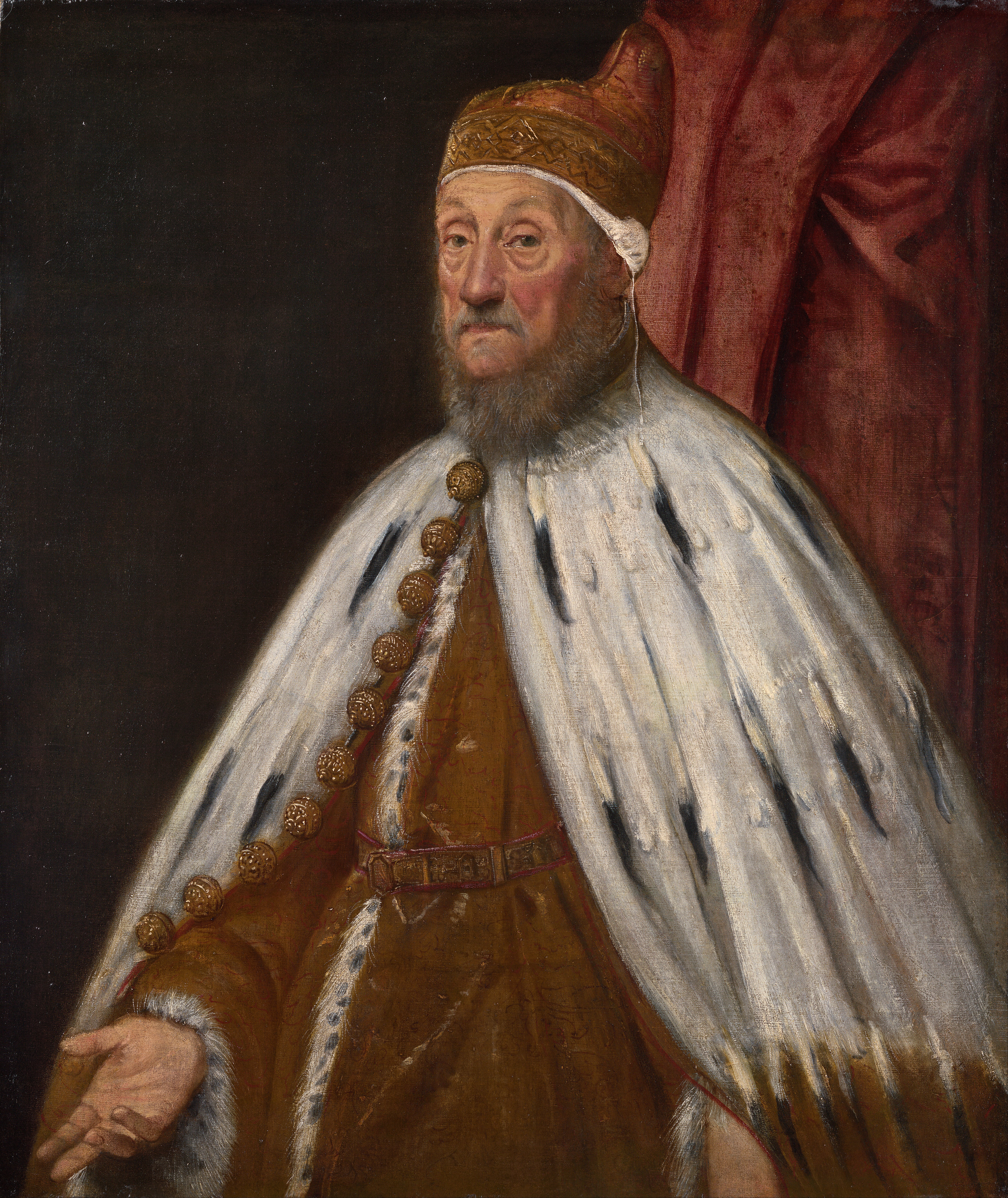
- Portrait of Doge Pietro Loredan, by Jacopo Tintoretto, 1567–1570, National Gallery of Victoria, Melbourne

Doge of Venice
- Reign: 29 November 1567 – 3 May 1570
- Coronation: 29 November 1570
- Predecessor: Girolamo Priuli
- Successor: Alvise I Mocenigo
- Born: c. 1481; Venice, Republic of Venice
- Died: 3 May 1570 (aged 88–89); Venice, Republic of Venice
- Burial: 7 May 1570; Church of St. Job
- Spouse: Lucrezia Capello
- Issue: Alvise Loredan (1521–1593)
- Dynasty: House of Loredan
- Father: Alvise Loredan di S. Pantaleone
- Mother: Isabella Barozzi
- Religion: Roman Catholicism
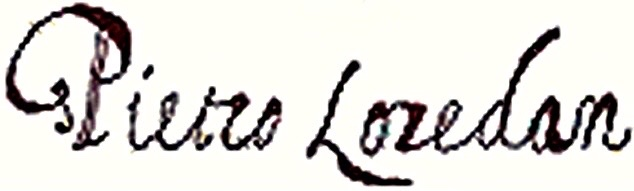
- Signature

Pietro Loredan (Italian: [ˈpjɛːtro loreˈdan]; Venetian: Piero Loredan [ˈpjɛɾo loɾeˈdaŋ]; 1481/1482 – 3 May 1570) of the noble Loredan family, was the 84th Doge of Venice, reigning from 1567 to 1570.

== Early life and marriage ==
Pietro Loredan was born in Venice in 1481 as the third son of Alvise di Polo di Francesco Loredan, of the S. Pantalon della Frescada branch, and Isabella Barozzi di Pietro, of the S. Moisè branch.

He first married Maria Pasqualigo, and then in 1517, he married Lucrezia di Lorenzo Cappello, of the branch of S. Maria Mater Domini - the same as the famous Bianca Capello. Pietro and Lucrezia only had one son, Alvise Loredan (1521–93), who married Elena di Giovanni Emo and continued the lineage with numerous offspring. The fortune, real estate and land, in Venice and in the territories of Padua and Treviso, was divided by will among the numerous descendants who continued to use the ancestral residence in Rio della Frescada.

== Political career ==
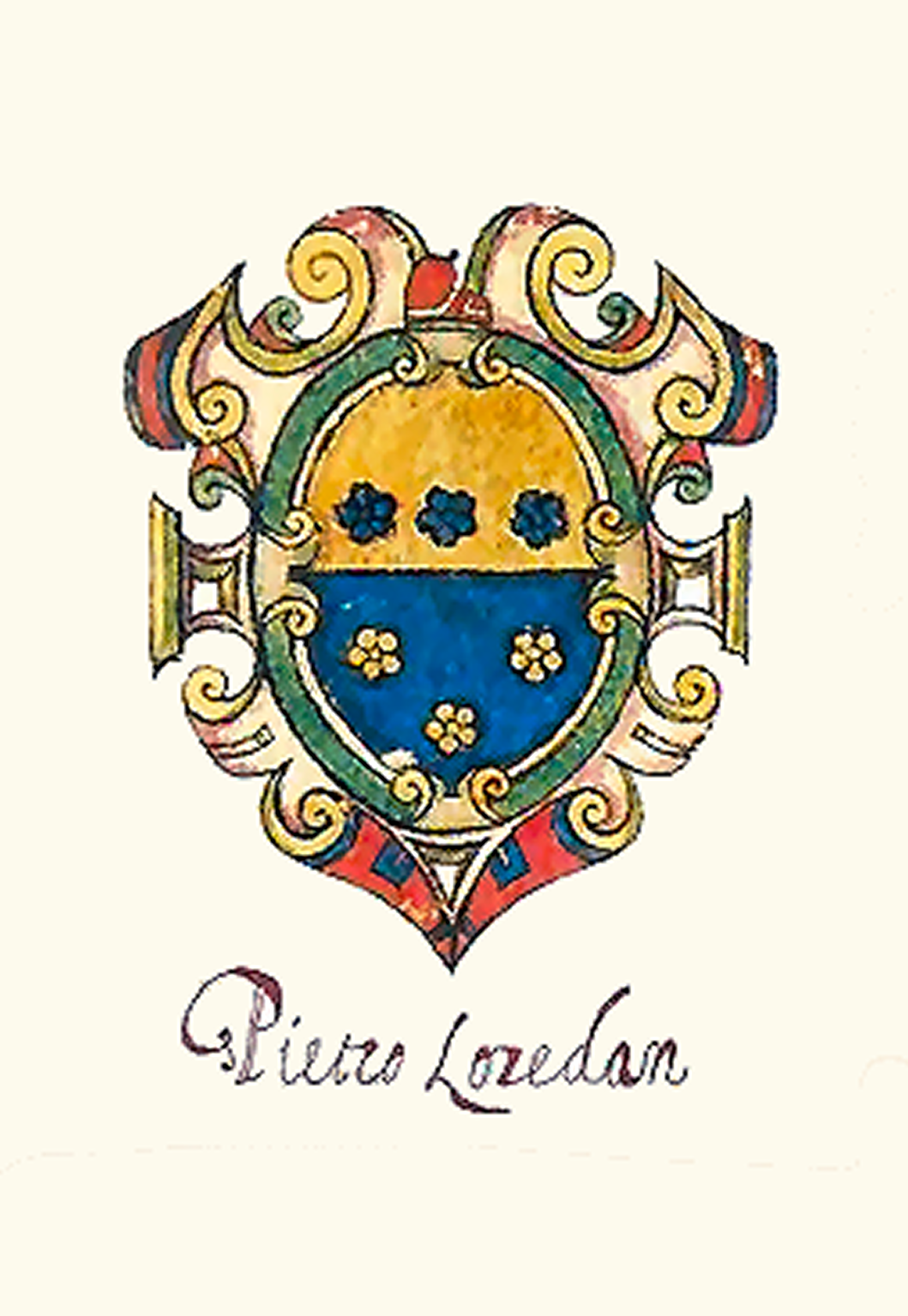
Coat of arms of Pietro Loredan

Pietro had an intense but not necessarily prestigious career, which he accompanied with the care of commercial interests, according to family tradition. Present in 1509 and in 1510 in the defense of Padua and Treviso, he made his debut in public life in 1510 as a sopracomito. In April of 1511 he was elected a senator. He intervened in the Senate, asking for the reduction of the sum that the Jews had to pay for their "conduct" and ruled in favor of a league with France, also willing to sell Cremona and Ghiara d'Adda in exchange for others territories.

In 1513 he left again to defend Padua and Treviso and, available for military roles, he offered to fill the positions of administrator of the Stradioti, and governor of Adria. Pietro refused his appointment as consul in Alexandria in 1516, when he intensified his entrepreneurial activity: in 1517 he, together with his brothers, armed a ship to transport pilgrims to the Holy Land, and the following year he set up a market galley on the Alexandria route.

Business did not, however, distract him from public service, as evidenced by the various candidacies and the appointment in the College of the Twenty Wise Men, while his financial fortune allowed him to enter the committee of guarantors of Banco Priuli. In 1545 he was one of the nine electors of Doge Francesco Donà; between 1546 and 1549 he ran several times for the Council of Ten which, after another stay in the Senate, he entered at the beginning of 1550, becoming its head. Then, he became a ducal councilor for the Dorsoduro district. In the 1550s, Pietro consolidated his personal prestige: he sat assiduously in the Senate, in the Council of Ten, as well as in the Signoria as ducal councilor. In 1559 he was included among the forty-one electors of Doge Girolamo Priuli. Between 1560 and 1562 he continued to hold important positions.

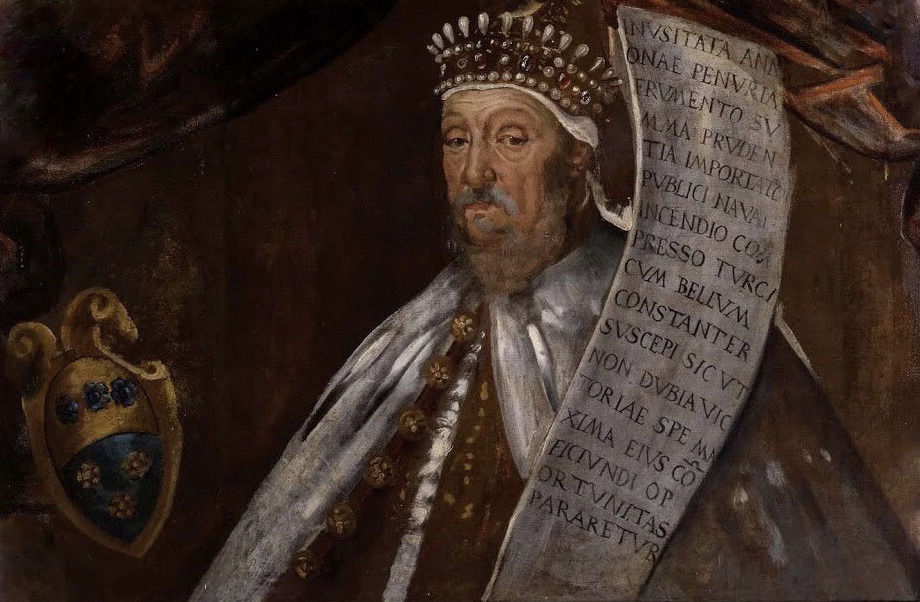
Portrait of Doge Pietro Loredan, by Tintoretto

== Dogeship ==
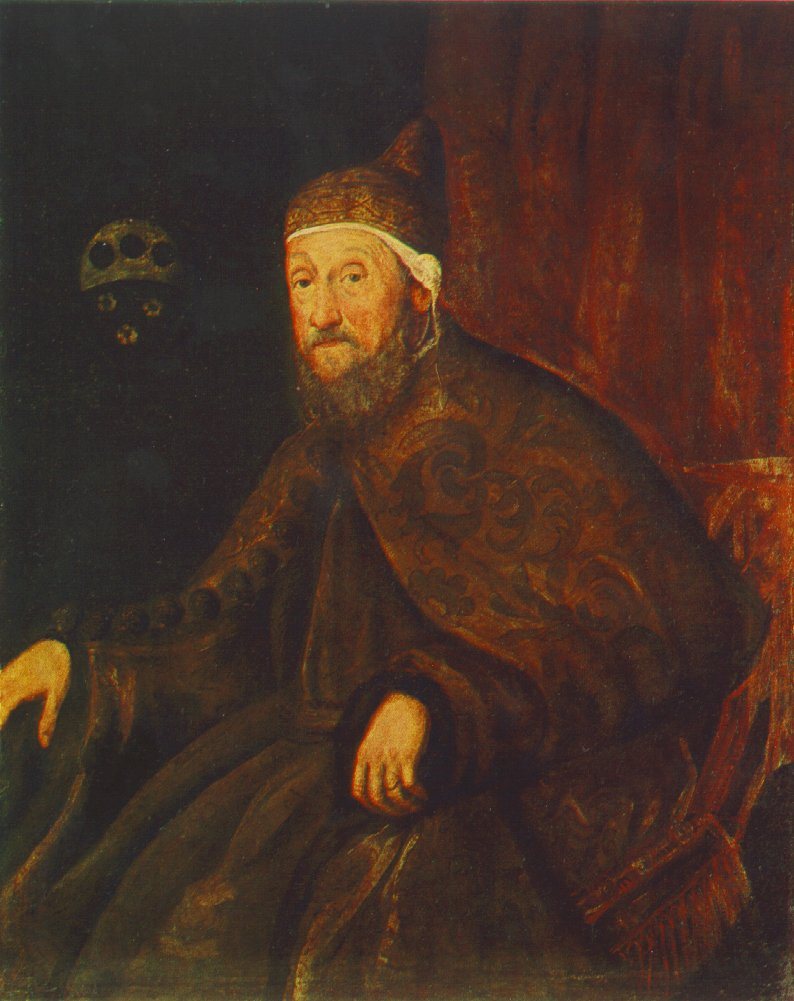
Portrait of Doge Pietro Loredan, by Jacopo Tintoretto

On 29 November 1567, Pietro was elected doge, which came to his surprise. "A man of 85 years, but very prosperous”, wrote of him the papal nuncio Giovanni Antonio Facchinetti, who would later become Pope Innocent IX. Considered a figure of little political importance, his dogeship was considered the most suitable because it was transitory and politically harmless. Religious and morally upright, educated, and of uncommon wisdom, Pietro, reluctant at the beginning, in the two and a half years of his reign showed recognized gifts of balance and prudence.

Although it was known that he was "of good will but little knowledge of matters of public government", some chroniclers pointed out that if his advice were listened to in the dramatic circumstances of those years, the state would benefit. After his election, Ottoman threats against Venetian Cyprus grew more and more, so much so as to temporarily quell the disputes of a judicial nature between Venice and the Holy See. Pietro showed a strong commitment to cope with the famine that struck Venice during his reign, as well as with the fire, considered arson, which devastated the Arsenal in 1569. In the spring of 1570, the Ottomans had intensified their preparations for war against Cyprus, which Venice was preparing to defend.

== Death ==
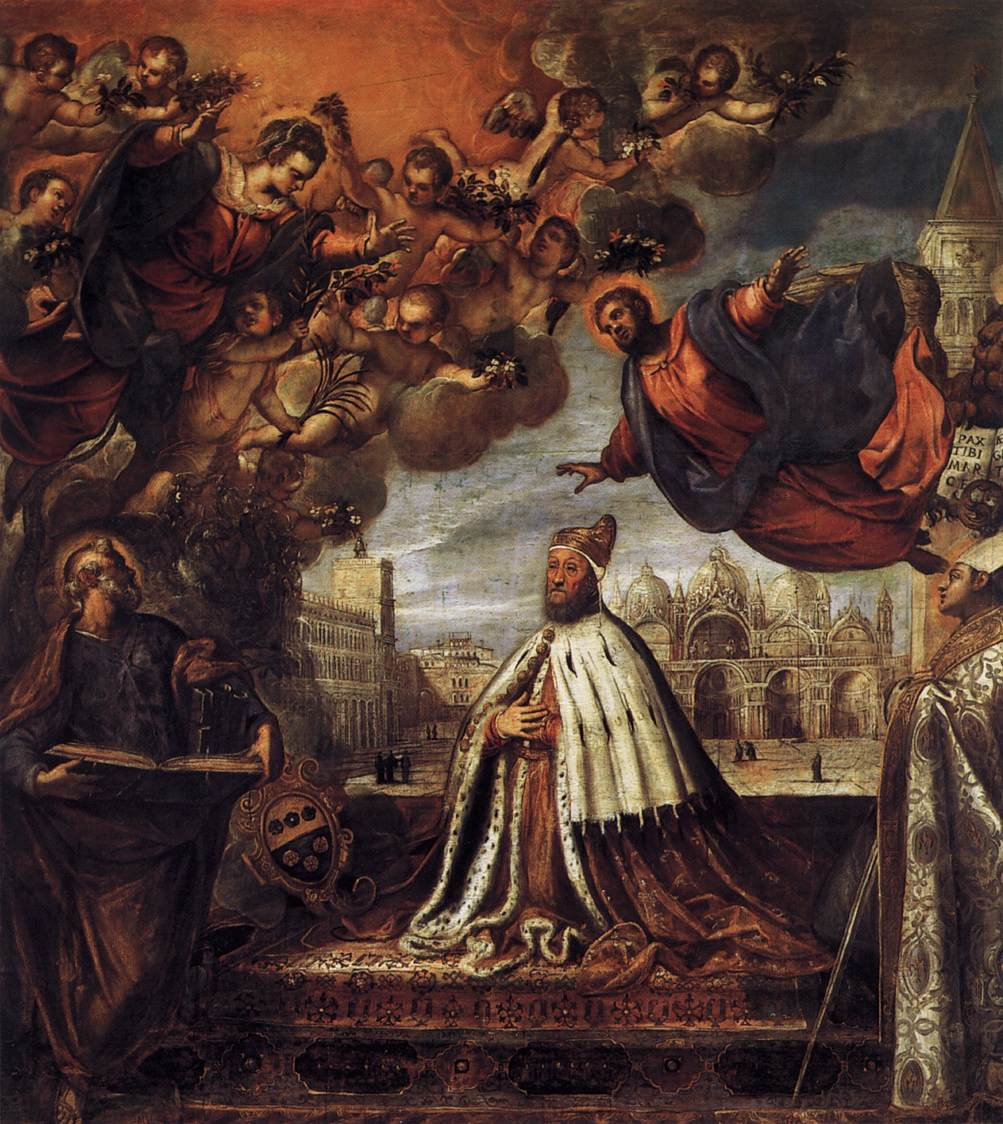
Doge Pietro Loredan Beseeching the Virgin, by Palma il Giovanne

The climate of tension weakened the physique of Pietro, who, struck by illness, fell ill with a fever and died after nine days, on 3 May 1570. The news was kept hidden for a few days, "so that the negotiators of the state do not suffer", wrote the papal nuncio. The Senate met exceptionally, in absence of the doge, to deal with emergencies and, with an unusual procedure, hastened the appointment of his successor, Alvise I Mocenigo, who was elected on 9 May. On 7 May, the state funeral was celebrated in San Marco, instead of at Santi Giovanni e Paolo, due to bad weather. The body of Doge Pietro Loredan was carried to the cloister of S. Giobbe and buried in the family ark.

Doge Pietro Loredan was portrayed in the ducal palace by Domenico Tintoretto and the painting placed in the Senate room, and by Jacopo Tintoretto for the one in the Scrutinio room.

== Ancestry ==
House of Loredan-San Pantaleone della Frescada (Genealogy)

Francesco Loredan
Polo Loredan
Alvise Loredan	Isabella Barozzi
Lucrezia Capello	Pietro Loredan (1482-1570)
Alvise Loredan	Elena Emo
Elisabetta Loredan Foscari

== Literature ==
- Andrea da Mosto.I Dogi di Venezia, Florence 1983
- Helmut Dumler:Venedig und die Dogen Düsseldorf 2001

Political offices
Preceded by Girolamo Priuli	Doge of Venice; 1567–1570	Succeeded by Alvise I Mocenigo
