= Girolamo Priuli (1486–1567) =

Doge of Venice from 1559 to 1567

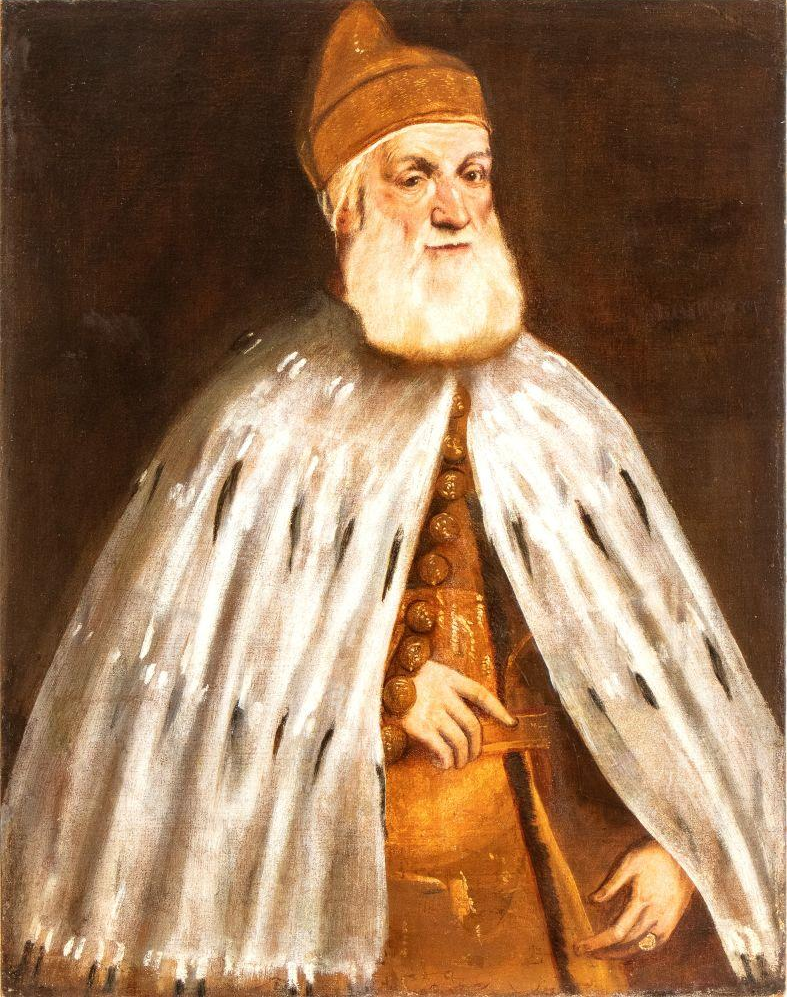
- Portrait of Girolamo Priuli (detail), by Tintoretto

Lifetime Doge of the Most Serene Republic of Venice
- In office 1559–1567
- Preceded by: Lorenzo Priuli
- Succeeded by: Pietro Loredan

Personal details
- Born: 1486 Venice
- Died: 4 November 1567 (aged 80–81) Venice
- Spouse: Elena Diedo
- Children: Antonio Priuli

Girolamo Priuli (1486 in Venice – 4 November 1567 in Venice) was a Venetian noble, who served as the eighty-third Doge of Venice, from 1 September 1559 until his sudden death from a stroke in 1567.

== History ==
He was the elder brother of the preceding doge, Lorenzo Priuli. Girolamo's face is familiar from Tintoretto's portrait.

Girolamo was the son of Alvise Peruli and his wife Chiara Lion.

As a man of culture he seemed insignificant in relation to his brother; ineloquent, he was at first scarcely popular but gained respect through the works embellishing the city that he achieved as doge, in a period, above all, of peace for the Repubblica Serenissima.

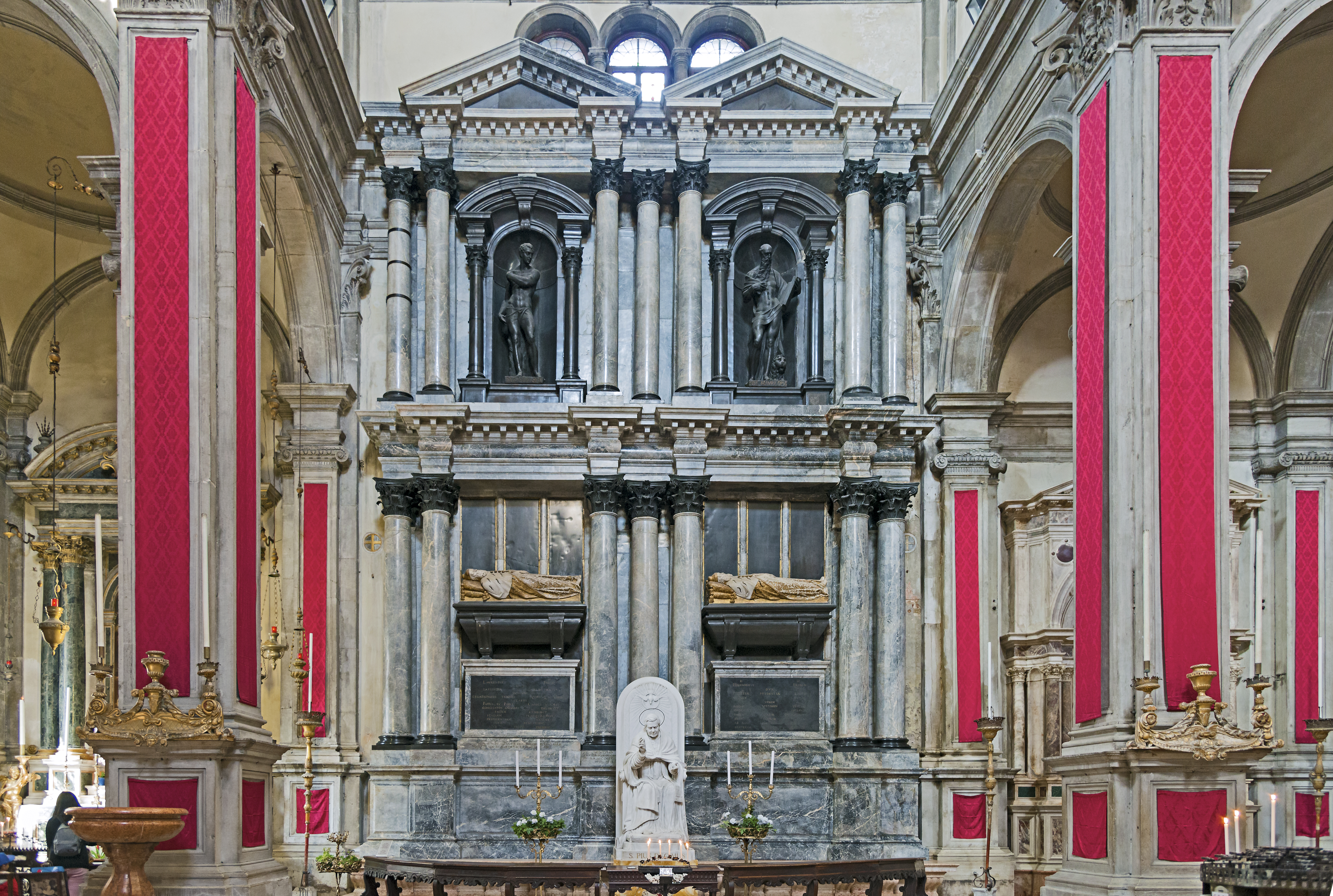
Monument and tombs of Doges Lorenzo Priuli and Gerolamo Priuli, by Cesare Franco.

His early career established him as an able merchant, though not among the most prominent. He served as procuratore di San Marco.

His marriage with Elena Diedo produced a son who was named Antonio Priuli and he became the 94th Doge of Venice reigning from 1618 until his death.

Political offices
Preceded by Lorenzo Priuli	Doge of Venice; 1559–1567	Succeeded by Pietro Loredan
